= 2010–11 Rangers F.C. season =

Rangers
2010–11 season
- Chairman: Alastair Johnston (until 23 May); Craig Whyte (from 24 May)
- Manager: Walter Smith
- Ground: Ibrox Stadium; Glasgow, Scotland (Capacity: 51,082)
- Scottish Premier League: 1st
- Scottish Cup: Fifth round
- League Cup: Winners
- Champions League: Group stage
- Europa League: Round of 16
- Top goalscorer: League: Kenny Miller (21); All: Kenny Miller (22)
- Highest home attendance: 50,248 vs Celtic (24 April 2011)
- Lowest home attendance: 13,215 vs Kilmarnock (10 January 2011)
Home colours	Away colours	Third colours

The 2010–11 season was the 131st season of competitive football by Rangers.

== Overview ==
Rangers played a total of 55 competitive matches during the 2010–11 season. With financial problems at the club ongoing, the summer began for Rangers with several players leaving the club. With a limited transfer budget and a small squad. Walter Smith had to decide whether to increase the number of playing staff or improve the starting eleven, he opted for quality.

Both sides of the Old Firm began the season with eight league wins in a row, however, with the sides meeting on matchday nine something had to give. Rangers claimed a 3–1 victory over Celtic and took early control of the league. A 1–1 draw at home to Inverness CT the following weekend ended Rangers 100% start to the season and a home defeat to Hibernian inflicted the team's first league defeat of the season, the first of five. The cold spell in the winter of 2010–11 saw many postponements and for long spells Rangers were behind Celtic but with games in hand. In the third league meeting between the Old Firm, Celtic came out on top and mathematical lead the table, for the first time that season. However Celtic's advantage was short lived after a loss to Motherwell the following week. This allowed Rangers to regain top spot, but 3–2 loss to Dundee United at Ibrox followed by a 0–0 draw in the final Old Firm fixture left the title in Celtic's hands, with just four matches remaining. There was to be a final twist in the league season, on 3 May Celtic lost a rearranged match away to Inverness and so with three matches remaining Rangers had a one-point lead. Smith's side went on to win all three fixtures, scoring 11 goals, and claimed the club's 54th league championship.

In the domestic cup competitions Rangers won the League Cup after beating Celtic 2-1 AET. However, Rangers lost 1–0 to Celtic in the fifth round replay in Scottish Cup. The match was marked by several incidents, three Rangers players were sent-off and Celtic manager Neil Lennon and McCoist were involved in a pitch side bust up.

In Europe, Rangers automatically qualified for the UEFA Champions League group stages for the second season in a row. They drew Manchester United, Valencia and Bursaspor. Rangers were unbeaten in their first three group stage games, with a 0–0 draw at Old Trafford, a 1–0 victory over Bursaspor at Ibrox and a 1–1 draw at home to Valencia. A 3–0 defeat in Spain to Valencia followed by a 1–0 loss at home to Manchester United ended Rangers chances of qualifying for the last 16, but third place and a spot in the UEFA Europa League was already secured with Bursaspor having failed to pick up a point in five games. In the last group match Rangers drew 1–1 in Turkey, giving Bursaspor their first Champions League point. However, Rangers did make it to the last 16 of the Europa League, beating Sporting Lisbon on away goals in the last 32 but lost to PSV Eindhoven on aggregate.

On 6 May 2011, it was confirmed that David Murray had sold his controlling interest in the club (85.3%) to Wavetower limited for £1, a company owned by businessman Craig Whyte.

== Players ==
=== Squad information ===
N	Pos.	Nat.	Name	Age	Since	App	Goals	Ends	Transfer fee	Notes
1	GK	(Scotland)	Allan McGregor	29	1998	235	0	2013	Youth system	
3	DF	(Scotland)	David Weir (captain)	41	2007 (Winter)	230	5	2011	Free	
4	DF	(Scotland)	Kirk Broadfoot	26	2007	98	1	2013	Free	
5	DF	(Bosnia and Herzegovina)	Saša Papac	31	2006	201	7	2011	£0.45m	
6	MF	(Scotland)	Lee McCulloch	33	2007	143	15	2013	£2.25m	
7	MF	(United States)	Maurice Edu	25	2008	83	9	2013	£2.6m	
8	MF	(Northern Ireland)	Steven Davis	26	2008	172	17	2012	£3m	
9	FW	(Scotland)	Kenny Miller	31	2008	144	67	2011	£2m	left on 21 January
10	MF	(Scotland)	John Fleck	19	2007	53	3	2013	Youth system	
11	FW	(Northern Ireland)	Kyle Lafferty	23	2008	115	31	2013	£3.25m	
12	DF	(Scotland)	Richard Foster	25	2010	24	0	2011	Loan	
14	FW	(Scotland)	Steven Naismith	24	2008	125	24	2015	£1.9m	
15	FW	(Northern Ireland)	David Healy	31	2011 (Winter)	10	1	2011	Free	
16	DF	(Scotland)	Steven Whittaker	26	2007	181	26	2012	£2m	
17	FW	(Lithuania)	Andrius Velička	31	2008	11	5	2011	£1m	left on 31 January
17	FW	(Senegal)	El Hadji Diouf	30	2011 (Winter)	22	2	2011	Loan	
18	FW	(Croatia)	Nikica Jelavić	25	2010	27	19	2014	£4m	
19	FW	(England)	James Beattie	33	2010	10	0	2012	£1.25m	
20	MF	(Slovakia)	Vladimír Weiss	21	2010	35	5	2011	Loan	
21	DF	(England)	Kyle Bartley	19	2011 (Winter)	9	1	2011	Loan	
22	DF	(Scotland)	Andy Webster	29	2008	3	1	2011	£0.4m	left on 31 January
23	DF	(Scotland)	Jordan McMillan	22	2005	2	0	2012	Youth system	
24	DF	(Algeria)	Madjid Bougherra	28	2008	109	5	2012	£2.5m	
25	GK	(Scotland)	Neil Alexander	33	2008 (Winter)	45	0	2013	Free	
28	LW	(France)	Salim Kerkar	23	2010	1	0	2011	Free	
29	FW	(Northern Ireland)	Andrew Little	22	2006	13	2	2011	Youth system	
34	FW	(Scotland)	Rory Loy	22	2006	2	0	2011	£0.025m	left on 28 January
39	MF	(Scotland)	Gregg Wylde	20	2007	23	0	2012	Youth system	
40	MF	(Scotland)	Jamie Ness	20	2007	13	1	2015	Youth system	
41	MF	(Scotland)	Kyle Hutton	20	2008	14	0	2014	Youth system	
45	DF	(Scotland)	Darren Cole	19	2008	1	0	2013	Youth system	

- Last updated: 15 May 2011
- Source: Players transfer, Wikipedia players' articles,

Football Squads (for player's number)

- Ordered by position on pitch.

=== Transfers ===
==== In ====
No.	Pos.	Nat.	Name	Age	Moving from	Type	Transfer window	Ends	Transfer fee	Source
50	MF	(Northern Ireland)	Andrew Mitchell	18	Manchester City (England)	Transfer	Summer	2012	Free	
19	FW	(England)	James Beattie	32	Stoke City (England)	Transfer	Summer	2012	£1.25m	
20	MF	(Slovakia)	Vladimír Weiss	20	Manchester City (England)	Loan	Summer	2011	£0.7m	
18	FW	(Croatia)	Nikica Jelavić	24	Rapid Wien (Austria)	Transfer	Summer	2014	£4m	
12	DF	(Scotland)	Richard Foster	25	Aberdeen	Loan	Summer	2011	n/a	
28	MF	(Algeria)	Salim Kerkar	23	Gueugnon (France)	Transfer	n/a	2011	Free	
15	FW	(Northern Ireland)	David Healy	31	Sunderland (England)	Transfer	Winter	2011	Free	
21	DF	(England)	Kyle Bartley	19	Arsenal (England)	Loan	Winter	2011	n/a	
17	FW	(Senegal)	El Hadji Diouf	30	Blackburn Rovers (England)	Loan	Winter	2011	n/a	

Last updated: 31 January 2011
Total spending: £5.95m

==== Out ====
No.	Pos.	Nat.	Name	Age	Moving to	Type	Transfer window	Transfer fee	Source
68	DF	(Scotland)	Scott Durie	18	East Fife	End of contract	Summer	n/a	
61	GK	(Scotland)	Mark Weir	18	Free agent	End of contract	Summer	n/a	
65	DF	(Scotland)	Stephen Forbes	19	Free agent	End of contract	Summer	n/a	
43	FW	(Scotland)	Steven Lennon	22	Dundalk (Republic of Ireland)	End of contract	Summer	n/a	
44	MF	(Scotland)	Paul Emslie	22	Peterhead	End of contract	Summer	n/a	
46	DF	(Scotland)	Steven Kinniburgh	20	Oxford United (England)	End of contract	Summer	n/a	
77	MF	(New Zealand)	Andrew Milne	17	Auckland City (New Zealand)	End of contract	Summer	n/a	
10	FW	(Spain)	Nacho Novo	31	Sporting Gijón (Spain)	End of contract	Summer	n/a	
20	MF	(United States)	Damarcus Beasley	28	Hannover 96 (Germany)	End of contract	Summer	n/a	
26	DF	(Scotland)	Steven Smith	24	Norwich City (England)	End of contract	Summer	n/a	
9	FW	(Scotland)	Kris Boyd	26	Middlesbrough (England)	End of contract	Summer	n/a	
41	GK	(Scotland)	Scott Gallacher	20	Forfar Athletic	Loan	Summer	n/a	
8	MF	(Scotland)	Kevin Thomson	25	Middlesbrough (England)	Transfer	Summer	£2m	
66	DF	(Scotland)	Danny Wilson	18	Liverpool (England)	Transfer	Summer	£2m	
17	FW	(Lithuania)	Andrius Velička	31	Aberdeen	Loan	Summer	n/a	
38	MF	(Scotland)	Stephen Stirling	21	Stirling Albion	Loan	Winter	n/a	
9	FW	(Scotland)	Kenny Miller	31	Bursaspor (Turkey)	Transfer	Winter	£0.4m	
42	FW	(Scotland)	Archie Campbell	20	Cowdenbeath	Loan	Winter	n/a	
34	FW	(Scotland)	Rory Loy	22	Carlisle United (England)	Transfer	Winter	Undisclosed	
19	FW	(England)	James Beattie	32	Blackpool (England)	Loan	Winter	n/a	
22	DF	(Scotland)	Andy Webster	28	Free agent	Contract terminated	Winter	n/a	
17	FW	(Lithuania)	Andrius Velička	31	Free agent	Contract terminated	Winter	n/a	
23	DF	(Scotland)	Jordan McMillan	22	Wrexham (Wales)	Loan	Winter	n/a	
36	DF	(Scotland)	Ross Perry	21	Falkirk	Loan	n/a	n/a	

Last updated: 10 February 2011
Total income: £4.4m

==== New contracts ====
No.	Pos.	Nat.	Name	Age	Status	Contract length	Expiry date	Source
9	FW	(Scotland)	Kris Boyd	26	Rejected	3 years	June 2013	
4	DF	(Scotland)	Kirk Broadfoot	25	Signed	3 years	June 2013	
3	DF	(Scotland)	David Weir	40	Signed	1 year	June 2011	
23	DF	(Scotland)	Jordan McMillan	21	Signed	2 years	June 2012	
30	GK	(Scotland)	Scott Gallacher	20	Signed	2 years	June 2012	
37	MF	(Scotland)	Andrew Shinnie	20	Signed	1 year	June 2011	
6	MF	(Scotland)	Lee McCulloch	32	Signed	2 years	June 2013	
25	GK	(Scotland)	Neil Alexander	32	Signed	2 years	June 2013	
45	DF	(Scotland)	Darren Cole	18	Signed	2 years	June 2013	
48	FW	(England)	Kane Hemmings	18	Signed	2 years	June 2013	
9	FW	(Scotland)	Kenny Miller	31	Rejected	2 years	June 2013	
14	FW	(Scotland)	Steven Naismith	24	Signed	3 years	May 2015	
40	MF	(Scotland)	Jamie Ness	19	Signed	2 years	June 2013	
40	MF	(Scotland)	Jamie Ness	20	Signed	4 years	June 2015	
41	MF	(Scotland)	Kyle Hutton	20	Signed	2 years	June 2014	
24	DF	(Algeria)	Madjid Bougherra	28	Rejected	2 years	June 2014	

Last updated: 11 April 2011

=== Squad statistics ===
				Total			Scottish Premier League		UEFA Champions League		Scottish Cup		League Cup		UEFA Europa League	
No.	Pos.	Nat.	Name	Sts	App	Gls	App	Gls	App	Gls	App	Gls	App	Gls	App	Gls
1	GK	(Scotland)	Allan McGregor	48	48		37		6		3				2	
3	DF	(Scotland)	David Weir	53	53		37		6		3		3		4	
4	DF	(Scotland)	Kirk Broadfoot	12	14		8		4				2			
5	DF	(Bosnia and Herzegovina)	Saša Papac	46	46	3	34	3	4		3		2		3	
6	MF	(Scotland)	Lee McCulloch	26	30	1	21		5		1	1	3			
7	MF	(United States)	Maurice Edu	41	47	5	33	2	4	1	3		3	1	4	1
8	MF	(Northern Ireland)	Steven Davis	53	53	5	37	4	6		3		3	1	4	
9	FW	(Scotland)	Kenny Miller	23	25	22	18	21	6	1			1			
10	MF	(Scotland)	John Fleck	5	17		13		1		1		1		1	
11	FW	(Northern Ireland)	Kyle Lafferty	31	44	15	31	11	4		2	1	3	3	4	
12	DF	(Scotland)	Richard Foster	19	24		15		3		2				4	
14	FW	(Scotland)	Steven Naismith	40	44	15	31	11	6	1	2		4	3	1	
15	FW	(Northern Ireland)	David Healy	2	10	1	8	1							2	
16	DF	(Scotland)	Steven Whittaker	52	52	7	36	4	6		3	2	3		4	1
17	FW	(Senegal)	El Hadji Diouf	11	22	2	15	1			2		1		4	1
18	FW	(Croatia)	Nikica Jelavić	24	27	19	23	16			1		3	3		
19	FW	(England)	James Beattie	6	10		7		2		1					
20	MF	(Slovakia)	Vladimír Weiss	22	35	4	23	4	3		2		4		3	
21	DF	(England)	Kyle Bartley	9	9	1	5	1			1				3	
22	DF	(Scotland)	Andy Webster	2	2		1						1			
23	DF	(Scotland)	Jordan McMillan		1				1							
24	DF	(Algeria)	Madjid Bougherra	47	47	2	31	1	5		3		4	1	4	
25	GK	(Scotland)	Neil Alexander	7	7		1						4		2	
28	MF	(France)	Salim Kerkar		1		1									
29	FW	(Northern Ireland)	Andrew Little	2	2	1							2	1		
34	FW	(Scotland)	Rory Loy		1		1									
39	MF	(Scotland)	Gregg Wylde	12	21		15				1		3		2	
40	MF	(Scotland)	Jamie Ness	10	13	1	11				2	1				
41	MF	(Scotland)	Kyle Hutton	5	14		7		2		1		3		1	
45	DF	(Scotland)	Darren Cole	1	1				1							

Last updated: 15 May 2011
Source: Soccerbase - Rangers 2010/2011 player appearances
Ordered by squad numbers
0 shown as blank

=== Top scorers ===
N	P	Nat.	Name	League	Scottish Cup	League Cup	Champions League	Europa League	Total
9	FW	(Scotland)	Kenny Miller	21			1		22
18	FW	(Croatia)	Nikica Jelavić	16		3			19
14	FW	(Scotland)	Steven Naismith	11		3	1		15
11	FW	(Northern Ireland)	Kyle Lafferty	11	1	3			15
16	DF	(Scotland)	Steven Whittaker	4	2			1	7
20	MF	(Slovakia)	Vladimír Weiss	5					5
7	MF	(United States)	Maurice Edu	2		1	1	1	5
8	MF	(Northern Ireland)	Steven Davis	4		1			5
5	DF	(Bosnia and Herzegovina)	Saša Papac	3					3
24	DF	(Algeria)	Madjid Bougherra	1		1			2
17	FW	(Senegal)	El Hadji Diouf	1				1	2
29	FW	(Northern Ireland)	Andrew Little			1			1
6	MF	(Scotland)	Lee McCulloch		1				1
40	MF	(Scotland)	Jamie Ness		1				1
15	FW	(Northern Ireland)	David Healy	1					1
21	DF	(England)	Kyle Bartley	1					1
			Own goal	7					7

Last updated: 15 May 2011
Source: Match reports
Only competitive matches

=== Disciplinary record ===
N	P	Nat.	Name	YC	Yellow card Red card	RC
1	GK	(Scotland)	Allan McGregor	2		
3	DF	(Scotland)	David Weir	9		
5	DF	(Bosnia and Herzegovina)	Saša Papac	7		
6	MF	(Scotland)	Lee McCulloch	7		
7	MF	(United States)	Maurice Edu	6		
8	MF	(Northern Ireland)	Steven Davis	2		
9	FW	(Scotland)	Kenny Miller	1		
10	MF	(Scotland)	John Fleck	1		
11	FW	(Northern Ireland)	Kyle Lafferty	8		1
12	DF	(Scotland)	Richard Foster	3		
14	FW	(Scotland)	Steven Naismith	12	1	
16	DF	(Scotland)	Steven Whittaker	4	1	
17	FW	(Senegal)	El Hadji Diouf	4		
18	FW	(Croatia)	Nikica Jelavić	6		
19	FW	(England)	James Beattie	1		
20	MF	(Slovakia)	Vladimír Weiss	5		
21	DF	(England)	Kyle Bartley	1		
24	DF	(Algeria)	Madjid Bougherra	14	1	
40	MF	(Scotland)	Jamie Ness	1		
41	MF	(Scotland)	Kyle Hutton	2		

Last updated: 15 May 2011
Source: Match reports
Only competitive matches

== Club ==
=== Board of directors ===
Position	Staff
Chairman	(Scotland) Alastair Johnston
Chief executive	(Scotland) Martin Bain
Finance director	(Scotland) Donald McIntyre
Non-executive director	(Scotland) John Greig
Non-executive director	(Scotland) John McClelland
Non-executive director	(Scotland) Dave King
Non-executive director	(Scotland) Paul Murray
Non-executive director	(Scotland) Mike McGill (until 6 May)
Non-executive director	(Scotland) Donald Muir (until 6 May)
Non-executive director	(England) Paul Betts (from 6 May)

Source: Wikipedia article

=== Coaching staff ===
Position	Staff
Manager	(Scotland) Walter Smith (until 16 May)
Assistant manager	(Scotland) Ally McCoist
First-team coach	(Scotland) Kenny McDowall
First-team coach	(Scotland) Ian Durrant
Head of Sports; Science	(Wales) Adam Owen
Goalkeepers coach	(Scotland) Jim Stewart (Scotland) Alan Main (from 7 January) (until 3 March)

Source: Wikipedia article

=== Other staff ===
Position	Staff
Head of Football; Administration	(Scotland) Andrew Dickson
Physiotherapist	(Scotland) Philip Yeates
Doctor	(Scotland) Dr Paul Jackson
Chief scout	(Scotland) Ewan Chester (until 28 May) (Scotland) Neil Murray (from 8 March)
First-team scout	(Scotland) John Brown (from 8 March)
Massuer	(Scotland) Davie Lavey
Kit controller	(Scotland) Jimmy Bell
Video analyst	(Scotland) Steve Harvey

Source: Wikipedia article

== Matches ==
=== Pre-season and friendlies ===
Game	Date	Tournament	Round	Ground	Opponent	Score^{1}	Report
1	18 July 2010	Friendly		A	Queen of the South	1–0	Report / Report link; Kick off / 15:00 BST; Attendance / 2,708; Referee / Bobby Madden (Scotland); Queen of the South / Rangers; / 56' Miller
2	25 July 2010	Sydney Festival of Football	GS	N	(England) Blackburn Rovers	2–1	Report / Report link; Kick off / 06:00 BST; Attendance / 14,153; Referee / Peter Green; Rangers / Blackburn Rovers; 11' Edu; 44' Miller / 64' (pen.) Dunn
3	28 July 2010	Sydney Festival of Football	GS	A	(Australia) Sydney FC	0–0	Report / Report link; Kick off / 11:15 BST; Attendance / 9,483; Referee / Matthew Breeze
4	31 July 2010	Sydney Festival of Football	GS	N	(Greece) AEK Athens	0–1	Report / Report link; Kick off / 08:00 BST; Attendance / 15,237; Referee / Matthew Breeze; AEK Athens / Rangers; 78' Burns
5	4 August 2010	Friendly		A	Clyde	2–1	Report / Report link; Kick off / 19:45 BST; Attendance / 2,687; Referee / Eddie Smith; Clyde / Rangers; 49' Stewart / 8' Naismith; 24' Miller
6	7 August 2010	Friendly		H	(England) Newcastle United	2–1	Report / Report link; Kick off / 13:00 BST; Attendance / 30,220; Referee / Dougie McDonald; Rangers / Newcastle United; 24' Miller; 65' Naismith / 70' Løvenkrands

Last updated: 7 August 2010
Source: Wikipedia article
^{1}Rangers goals come first.
National flags for Ground and Opponent columns are only shown when different from that of Rangers.
M = Match; Ground: H = Home, A = Away, N = Neutral, HR = Home replacement, AR = Away replacement.

=== Scottish Premier League ===
Game	Date	Tournament	Round	Ground	Opponent	Score^{1}	Report
1	14 August 2010	Scottish Premier League	1	H	Kilmarnock	2–1	Report / Report link; Kick off / 15:00 BST; Attendance / 45,739; Referee / William Collum (Scotland); Rangers / Kilmarnock; 16' Miller; 57' Naismith / 60' (pen.) Hamill
2	22 August 2010	Scottish Premier League	2	A	Hibernian	3–0	Report / Report link; Kick off / 12:15 BST; Attendance / 17,145; Referee / Iain Brines (Scotland); Hibernian / Rangers; (red card) 44' McBride / (red card) 44' Lafferty; 64' Miller; 70' Miller; 90+3' Miller
3	28 August 2010	Scottish Premier League	3	H	St Johnstone	2–1	Report / Report link; Kick off / 15:00 BST; Attendance / 46,109; Referee / Calum Murray (Scotland); Rangers / St Johnstone; 33' Papac; 79' Miller / 25' Grainger
4	11 September 2010	Scottish Premier League	4	A	Hamilton Academical	2–1	Report / Report link; Kick off / 12:00 BST; Attendance / 5,356; Referee / Alan Muir (Scotland); Hamilton Academical / Rangers; 56' (o.g.) Bougherra / 6' Jelavić; 90' Miller
6	18 September 2010	Scottish Premier League	5	H	Dundee United	4–0	Report / Report link; Kick off / 15:00 BST; Attendance / 44,786; Referee / Dougie McDonald (Scotland); Rangers / Dundee United; 9' (o.g.) Dillon; 69' Miller; 77' Naismith; 82' Miller
8	26 September 2010	Scottish Premier League	6	A	Aberdeen	3–2	Report / Report link; Kick off / 12:45 BST; Attendance / 15,307; Referee / William Collum (Scotland); Aberdeen / Rangers; 10' Vernon; 30' Maguire; (yellow card) 87' (red card) Maguire / 34' (pen.) Miller; 52' Miller; 67' Jelavić
10	2 October 2010	Scottish Premier League	7	A	Heart of Midlothian	2–1	Report / Report link; Kick off / 12:00 BST; Attendance / 15,637; Referee / Craig Thomson (Scotland); Heart of Midlothian / Rangers; 12' Skácel / 80' Lafferty; 90+4' Naismith
11	16 October 2010	Scottish Premier League	8	H	Motherwell	4–1	Report / Report link; Kick off / 15:00 BST; Attendance / 44,609; Referee / Stephen Finnie (Scotland); Rangers / Motherwell; 47' Naismith; 62' Davis; 65' Miller; 67' Weiss / 44' Blackman
13	24 October 2010	Scottish Premier League	9	A	Celtic	3–1	Report / Report link; Kick off / 12:45 BST; Attendance / 58,874; Referee / William Collum (Scotland); Celtic / Rangers; 45+1' Hooper / 49' (o.g.) Loovens; 55' Miller; 67' (pen.) Miller
15	30 October 2010	Scottish Premier League	10	H	Inverness Caledonian Thistle	1–1	Report / Report link; Kick off / 15:00 BST; Attendance / 43,697; Referee / Iain Brines (Scotland); Rangers / Inverness Caledonian Thistle; Edu 11' / Odhiambo 81'
17	7 November 2010	Scottish Premier League	11	A	St Mirren	3–1	Report / Report link; Kick off / 12:00 GMT; Attendance / 5,674; Referee / Craig Thomson (Scotland); St Mirren / Rangers; 76' (pen.) Higdon / 48' (o.g.) McAusland; 58' Naismith; 68' Miller
18	10 November 2010	Scottish Premier League	12	H	Hibernian	0–3	Report / Report link; Kick off / 19:45 GMT; Attendance / 41,514; Referee / Stevie O'Reilly (Scotland); Rangers / Hibernian; / 6' Miller; 19' Rankin; 76' Dickoh
19	13 November 2010	Scottish Premier League	13	H	Aberdeen	2–0	Report / Report link; Kick off / 15:00 GMT; Attendance / 44,919; Referee / Calum Murray (Scotland); Rangers / Aberdeen; 21' Miller; 32' Weiss
20	20 November 2010	Scottish Premier League	14	A	Kilmarnock	3–2	Report / Report link; Kick off / 12:00 GMT; Attendance / 10,177; Referee / Euan Norris (Scotland); Kilmarnock / Rangers; 21' Sammon; 59' Sammon / 42' (pen.) Miller; 55' (pen.) Miller; 64' Miller
23	11 December 2010	Scottish Premier League	17	A	Inverness Caledonian Thistle	1–1	Report / Report link; Kick off / 12:45 GMT; Attendance / 6,799; Referee / Calum Murray (Scotland); Inverness Caledonian Thistle / Rangers; 31' Hayes / 57' Miller
24	26 December 2010	Scottish Premier League	19	A	Motherwell	4–1	Report / Report link; Kick off / 15:00 GMT; Attendance / 9,371; Referee / Iain Brines (Scotland); Motherwell / Rangers; 46' Sutton / 26' Miller; 34' (o.g.) Saunders; 51' Weiss; 61' Miller
25	2 January 2011	Scottish Premier League	21	H	Celtic	0–2	Report / Report link; Kick off / 12:45 GMT; Attendance / 50,222; Referee / Craig Thomson (Scotland); Rangers / Celtic; / 62' Samaras; 70' (pen.) Samaras
27	15 January 2011	Scottish Premier League	22	H	Hamilton Academical	4–0	Report / Report link; Kick off / 15:00 GMT; Attendance / 44,639; Referee / Brian Winter (Scotland); Rangers / Hamilton Academical; 25' Weiss; 28' (pen.) Whittaker; 45+1' Weiss; 82' Edu
28	18 January 2011	Scottish Premier League	25	H	Inverness Caledonian Thistle	1–0	Report / Report link; Kick off / 19:45 GMT; Attendance / 41,623; Referee / Craig Thomson (Scotland); Rangers / Inverness Caledonian Thistle; 45' Davis
29	22 January 2011	Scottish Premier League	23	A	Heart of Midlothian	0–1	Report / Report link; Kick off / 12:45 GMT; Attendance / 16,737; Referee / Mike Tumilty (Scotland); Heart of Midlothian / Rangers; 77' Stevenson
30	26 January 2011	Scottish Premier League	24	A	Hibernian	2–0	Report / Report link; Kick off / 19:45 GMT; Attendance / 11,696; Referee / Stevie O'Reilly (Scotland); Hibernian / Rangers; / 26' Bougherra; 35' Jelavić
32	2 February 2011	Scottish Premier League	16	H	Heart of Midlothian	1–0	Report / Report link; Kick off / 19:45 GMT; Attendance / 44,823; Referee / Brian Winter (Scotland); Rangers / Heart of Midlothian; 4' Lafferty
34	12 February 2011	Scottish Premier League	26	H	Motherwell	6–0	Report / Report link; Kick off / 15:00 GMT; Attendance / 43,789; Referee / Alan Muir (Scotland); Rangers / Motherwell; 5' Naismith; 34' Jelavić; 37' Jelavić; 76' (o.g.) Hutchinson; 79' Jelavić; 83' Healy
36	20 February 2011	Scottish Premier League	27	A	Celtic	0–3	Report / Report link; Kick off / 12:30 GMT; Attendance / 58,748; Referee / Iain Brines (Scotland); Celtic / Rangers; 17' Hooper; 28' Hooper; 70' Commons
38	27 February 2011	Scottish Premier League	28	H	St Johnstone	4–0	Report / Report link; Kick off / 15:00 GMT; Attendance / 43,125; Referee / Steven McLean (Scotland); Rangers / St Johnstone; 5' Jelavić; 41' Lafferty; 81' Papac; 90+2' Jelavić
40	6 March 2011	Scottish Premier League	29	A	St Mirren	1–0	Report / Report link; Kick off / 12:45 GMT; Attendance / 5,405; Referee / William Collum (Scotland); St Mirren / Rangers; / 24' Bartley
42	13 March 2011	Scottish Premier League	33	H	Kilmarnock	2–1	Report / Report link; Kick off / 15:00 GMT; Attendance / 42,417; Referee / Alan Muir (Scotland); Rangers / Kilmarnock; 38' Diouf; 87' (o.g.) Clancy / 61' (pen.) Hamill
45	2 April 2011	Scottish Premier League	31	H	Dundee United	2–3	Report / Report link; Kick off / 15:00 BST; Attendance / 46,697; Referee / Steve Conroy (Scotland); Rangers / Dundee United; 19' Jelavić; 52' Naismith / 45' Robertson; 77' Russell; 89' Goodwillie
46	5 April 2011	Scottish Premier League	20	A	St Johnstone	2–0	Report / Report link; Kick off / 18:00 BST; Attendance / 5,820; Referee / Crawford Allan (Scotland); St Johnstone / Rangers; / 20' Lafferty; 83' Naismith
47	10 April 2011	Scottish Premier League	32	A	Hamilton Academical	1–0	Report / Report link; Kick off / 12:45 BST; Attendance / 4,526; Referee / Alan Muir (Scotland); Hamilton Academical / Rangers; / 44' Jelavić
48	13 April 2011	Scottish Premier League	30	A	Aberdeen	1–0	Report / Report link; Kick off / 19:45 BST; Attendance / 11,925; Referee / Calum Murray (Scotland); Aberdeen / Rangers; / 22' Jelavić
49	16 April 2011	Scottish Premier League	18	H	St Mirren	2–1	Report / Report link; Kick off / 15:00 BST; Attendance / 46,392; Referee / Euan Norris (Scotland); Rangers / St Mirren; 33' Papac; 52' (pen.) Whittaker / 38' McGregor
50	19 April 2011	Scottish Premier League	15	A	Dundee United	4–0	Report / Report link; Kick off / 19:45 BST; Attendance / 11,626; Referee / William Collum (Scotland); Dundee United / Rangers; (red card) 21' Kovačević; (red card) 59' Dillon; (red card) 78' Gomis / 22' (pen.) Whittaker; 60' (pen.) Whittaker; 73' Jelavić; 83' Lafferty
51	24 April 2011	Scottish Premier League	34	H	Celtic	0–0	Report / Report link; Kick off / 12:30 BST; Attendance / 50,248; Referee / Craig Thomson (Scotland)
52	30 April 2011	Scottish Premier League	35	A	Motherwell	5–0	Report / Report link; Kick off / 12:00 BST; Attendance / 8,968; Referee / Mike Tumilty (Scotland); Motherwell / Rangers; / 18' Lafferty; 51' Davis; 64' Jelavić; 76' Naismith; 90+1' Naismith
53	7 May 2011	Scottish Premier League	36	H	Heart of Midlothian	4–0	Report / Report link; Kick off / 12:15 BST; Attendance / 46,178; Referee / Iain Brines (Scotland); Rangers / Heart of Midlothian; 23' Jelavić; 40' Lafferty; 44' Davis; 84' (o.g.) Stevenson / (red card) 62' Jónsson
54	10 May 2011	Scottish Premier League	37	H	Dundee United	2–0	Report / Report link; Kick off / 19:45 BST; Attendance / 49,267; Referee / Calum Murray (Scotland); Rangers / Dundee United; 21' Jelavić; 25' Lafferty
55	15 May 2011	Scottish Premier League	38	A	Kilmarnock	5–1	Report / Report link; Kick off / 12:30 BST; Attendance / 16,173; Referee / Craig Thomson (Scotland); Kilmarnock / Rangers; 65' Dayton / 1' Lafferty; 5' Naismith; 7' Lafferty; 49' Jelavić; 53' Lafferty

Last updated: 15 May 2011
Source: Wikipedia article
^{1}Rangers goals come first.
National flags for Ground and Opponent columns are only shown when different from that of Rangers.
M = Match; Ground: H = Home, A = Away, N = Neutral, HR = Home replacement, AR = Away replacement.

=== Scottish League Cup ===
Game	Date	Tournament	Round	Ground	Opponent	Score^{1}	Report
7	21 September 2010	League Cup	3	H	Dunfermline Athletic	7–2	Report / Report link; Kick off / 19:45 BST; Attendance / 23,120; Referee / Euan Norris (Scotland); Rangers / Dunfermline Athletic; 21' Jelavić; 23' Lafferty; 38' Bougherra; 47' Lafferty; 59' Jelavić; 71' Lafferty; 77' Naismith / 41' Woods; 46' Cardle
14	27 October 2010	League Cup	QF	A	Kilmarnock	2–0	Report / Report link; Kick off / 19:45 BST; Attendance / 7,561; Referee / Mike Tumilty (Scotland); Kilmarnock / Rangers; / 25' Little; 61' Naismith
31	30 January 2011	League Cup	SF	N	Motherwell	2–1	Report / Report link; Kick off / 15:00 GMT; Attendance / 23,432; Referee / William Collum (Scotland); Rangers / Motherwell; 20' Edu; 75' Naismith / 66' Lasley
44	20 March 2011	League Cup	F	N	Celtic	2–1	Report / Report link; Kick off / 15:00 GMT; Attendance / 51,181; Referee / Craig Thomson (Scotland); Celtic / Rangers; 31' Ledley; (red card) 120+1' Izaguirre / 24' Davis; 98' Jelavić

Last updated: 20 March 2011
Source: Wikipedia article
^{1}Rangers goals come first.
National flags for Ground and Opponent columns are only shown when different from that of Rangers.
M = Match; Ground: H = Home, A = Away, N = Neutral, HR = Home replacement, AR = Away replacement.

=== Scottish Cup ===
Game	Date	Tournament	Round	Ground	Opponent	Score^{1}	Report
26	10 January 2011	Scottish Cup	4	H	Kilmarnock	3–0	Report / Report link; Kick off / 19:30 GMT; Attendance / 13,215; Referee / Stevie O'Reilly (Scotland); Rangers / Kilmarnock; 20' McCulloch; 36' Lafferty; 71' (pen.) Whittaker
33	6 February 2011	Scottish Cup	5	H	Celtic	2–2	Report / Report link; Kick off / 12:15 GMT; Attendance / 50,230; Referee / Calum Murray (Scotland); Rangers / Celtic; 3' Ness; 41' (pen.) Whittaker; (yellow card) 76' (red card) Naismith / 16' Commons; (red card) 38' Forster; 65' Brown
39	2 March 2011	Scottish Cup	5 R	A	Celtic	0–1	Report / Report link; Kick off / 19:45 GMT; Attendance / 57,847; Referee / Calum Murray (Scotland); Celtic / Rangers; 48' Wilson / (yellow card) 36' (red card) Whittaker; (yellow card) 90+4' (red card) Bougherra

Last updated: 2 March 2011
Source: Wikipedia article
^{1}Rangers goals come first.
National flags for Ground and Opponent columns are only shown when different from that of Rangers.
M = Match; Ground: H = Home, A = Away, N = Neutral, HR = Home replacement, AR = Away replacement.

=== UEFA Champions League ===
Game	Date	Tournament	Round	Ground	Opponent	Score^{1}	Report
5	14 September 2010	UEFA Champions League	GS	A	(England) Manchester United	0–0	Report / Report link; Kick off / 19:45 BST; Attendance / 74,408; Referee / (Portugal) Olegário Benquerença
9	29 September 2010	UEFA Champions League	GS	H	(Turkey) Bursaspor	1–0	Report / Report link; Kick off / 19:45 BST; Attendance / 41,905; Referee / (Belgium) Serge Gumienny; Rangers / Bursaspor; 18' Naismith
12	20 October 2010	UEFA Champions League	GS	H	(Spain) Valencia	1–1	Report / Report link; Kick off / 19:45 BST; Attendance / 45,153; Referee / (Italy) Nicola Rizzoli; Rangers / Valencia; 34' Edu / 46' (o.g.) Edu
16	2 November 2010	UEFA Champions League	GS	A	(Spain) Valencia	0–3	Report / Report link; Kick off / 19:45 GMT; Attendance / 25,000; Referee / (Germany) Felix Brych; Valencia / Rangers; 34' Soldado; 71' Soldado; 90' Tino Costa
21	24 November 2010	UEFA Champions League	GS	H	(England) Manchester United	0–1	Report / Report link; Kick off / 19:45 GMT; Attendance / 49,764; Referee / (Switzerland) Massimo Busacca; Rangers / Manchester United; / 87' (pen.) Rooney
22	7 December 2010	UEFA Champions League	GS	A	(Turkey) Bursaspor	1–1	Report / Report link; Kick off / 19:45 GMT; Attendance / 22,000; Referee / (France) Tony Chapron; Bursaspor / Rangers; 79' Yildirim / 19' Miller

Last updated: 7 December 2010
Source: Wikipedia article
^{1}Rangers goals come first.
National flags for Ground and Opponent columns are only shown when different from that of Rangers.
M = Match; Ground: H = Home, A = Away, N = Neutral, HR = Home replacement, AR = Away replacement.

=== UEFA Europa League ===
Game	Date	Tournament	Round	Ground	Opponent	Score^{1}	Report
35	17 February 2011	UEFA Europa League	Round of 32	H	(Portugal) Sporting CP	1–1	Report / Report link; Kick off / 20:05 GMT; Attendance / 34,095; Referee / (Germany) Manuel Gräfe; Rangers / Sporting CP; 66' Whittaker / 89' Fernández
37	24 February 2011	UEFA Europa League	Round of 32	A	(Portugal) Sporting CP	2–2	Report / Report link; Kick off / 18:00 GMT; Attendance / 15,375; Referee / Paolo Tagliavento (Italy); Sporting CP / Rangers; 42' Mendes; 83' Djaló / 20' Diouf; 90+2' Edu
41	10 March 2011	UEFA Europa League	Round of 16	A	(Netherlands) PSV Eindhoven	0–0	Report / Report link; Kick off / 18:00 GMT; Attendance / 30,000; Referee / (Sweden) Martin Hansson
43	17 March 2011	UEFA Europa League	Round of 16	H	(Netherlands) PSV Eindhoven	0–1	Report / Report link; Kick off / 20:05 GMT; Attendance / 35,373; Referee / (Austria) Robert Schörgenhofer; Rangers / PSV Eindhoven; / 13' Lens

Last updated: 18 March 2011
Source: Wikipedia article
^{1}Rangers goals come first.
National flags for Ground and Opponent columns are only shown when different from that of Rangers.
M = Match; Ground: H = Home, A = Away, N = Neutral, HR = Home replacement, AR = Away replacement.

== Competitions ==
=== Overall ===
Competition	Started round	Current position / round	Final position / round	First match	Last match
Scottish Premier League	—	—	1st	14 August	15 May
UEFA Champions League	Group stage	—	Group stage	14 September	7 December
UEFA Europa League	Round of 32	—	Round of 16	17 February	17 March
League Cup	3rd round	—	Winners	21 September	20 March
Scottish Cup	4th Round	—	5th Round	10 January	2 March

Source: Competitions

=== Scottish Premier League ===
==== Standings ====
Pos	Team	Pld	W	D	L	GF	GA	GD	Pts	Qualification or relegation
1	Rangers (C)	38	30	3	5	88	29	+59	93	Qualification for the Champions League third qualifying round
2	Celtic	38	29	5	4	85	22	+63	92	Qualification for the Europa League play-off round (Note: Celtic entered the play-off round of the 2011–12 UEFA Europa League as they won the 2011 Scottish Cup Final. Due to this, Heart of Midlothian also moved up to the third qualifying round, whilst fourth-placed team Dundee United received the second qualifying round spot.)
3	Heart of Midlothian	38	18	9	11	53	45	+8	63	Qualification for the Europa League third qualifying round
4	Dundee United	38	17	10	11	55	50	+5	61	Qualification for the Europa League second qualifying round
5	Kilmarnock	38	13	10	15	53	55	−2	49	

Source: SPFL Archive
Rules for classification: 1) points; 2) goal difference; 3) number of goals scored.
(C) Champions

==== Results summary ====
Overall								Home						Away					
Pld	W	D	L	GF	GA	GD	Pts	W	D	L	GF	GA	GD	W	D	L	GF	GA	GD
38	30	3	5	88	29	+59	93	14	2	3	43	14	+29	16	1	2	45	15	+30

Last updated: 15 May 2011.
Source: Wikipedia article

==== Results by round ====
Round	1	2	3	4	5	6	7	8	9	10	11	12	13	14	15	16	17	18	19	20	21	22	23	24	25	26	27	28	29	30	31	32	33	34	35	36	37	38
Ground	H	A	H	A	H	H	A	H	A	H	A	H	H	A	A	H	A	H	A	A	H	H	A	A	H	H	A	H	A	A	H	A	H	H	A	H	H	A
Result	W	W	W	W	W	W	W	W	W	D	W	L	W	W	W	W	D	W	W	W	L	W	L	W	W	W	L	W	W	W	L	W	W	D	W	W	W	W

Updated to match(es) played on 15 May 2011. Source: 2010–11 Scottish Premier League
A = Away; H = Home; W = Win; D = Draw; L = Loss

=== UEFA Champions League ===
==== Group C ====
Pos	Team	Pld	W	D	L	GF	GA	GD	Pts	Qualification
1	(England) Manchester United	6	4	2	0	7	1	+6	14	Advance to knockout phase
2	(Spain) Valencia	6	3	2	1	15	4	+11	11	Advance to knockout phase
3	(Scotland) Rangers	6	1	3	2	3	6	−3	6	Transfer to Europa League
4	(Turkey) Bursaspor	6	0	1	5	2	16	−14	1	

Source: Soccerway
