= 2009–10 Rangers F.C. season =

Rangers
2009–10 season
- Chairman: David Murray (until 26 August); Alastair Johnston (from 26 August)
- Manager: Walter Smith
- Ground: Ibrox Stadium
- Scottish Premier League: 1st
- Scottish Cup: Quarter-finals
- League Cup: Winners
- Champions League: Group stage
- Top goalscorer: League: Kris Boyd (23); All: Kris Boyd (26)
Home colours	Away colours	Third colours

The 2009–10 season was the 130th season of competitive football by Rangers.

== Overview ==
Rangers played a total of 54 competitive matches during the 2009–10 season. A quiet summer in terms of transfer arrivals contrasted to the outgoings. The club removed eleven players who had made first team appearances from the wage bill on permanent and loan deals. The only addition to the playing staff was Jérôme Rothen on a season loan, Rothen was the first player to sign for the club in over a year. On 26 August, chairman David Murray stepped down and was replaced by non-executive director Alastair Johnston. Johnston stated that one of his main priorities was to find a buyer for owner Murray's shares. On 24 October, Rangers manager Walter Smith was reported to say that Lloyds Banking Group, who the club was in debt to, was "effectively running the club". On 12 November, the extent of the club's financial problems was shown to be £31m in debt, a rise of £10m from the previous year.

On the field, Rangers' Scottish Premier League title defence got off to a stuttering start, three wins in the league was followed by three draws, the first Old Firm victory of the season was followed by poor performances against St Johnstone and dropped points at home to Hibernian. The side lost their first league match of the season away to Aberdeen on 28 November but then embarked on a six-match winning run, scoring 26 goals in the process. At the start of 2010, Rangers sat at the top of the league. The second Old Firm fixture finished in a 1–1 draw. Rangers had a ten-point lead by mid February. Rangers won the third Old Firm match 1-0 thanks to an injury time winner from Maurice Edu which all but secured the title. The side had to wait nearly two months to be confirmed as champions due to dropping points to St Johnstone and Dundee United. On 25 April Rangers won their 53rd league title after defeating Hibernian 1–0 at Easter Road, with Kyle Lafferty scoring the only goal.

In the domestic cup competitions, Rangers won the League Cup after a 1–0 victory over St Mirren in the final, despite being reduced to nine men with Danny Wilson and Kevin Thomson being sent-off. However, Rangers were unable to retain the Scottish Cup after losing 1–0 to eventual winners Dundee United in a quarter-final replay.

Rangers were seeded in pot two of the UEFA Champions League group stage for the first time. The club was drawn against Spanish team Sevilla, German outfit VfB Stuttgart and Romanian champions Unirea Urziceni. A 1–1 away draw in Germany was followed by two consecutive 4–1 defeats at home to Sevilla and Unirea, the latter being regarded as one of the club's worst ever European results. Rangers were left with a small chance of qualifying from the group after a 1–1 draw in the return leg with Unirea, a match that saw trouble in the Rangers fans section of the stadium; the club was later charged by UEFA for inappropriate conduct and following an investigation fined €20,000 plus ordered to pay the cost of repairing the damage to the stadium infrastructure caused by its supporters. The side finished bottom of their group and was knocked out of European football altogether after two defeats from in the final two matches.

== Players ==
=== Squad information ===
N	Pos.	Nat.	Name	Age	Since	App	Goals	Ends	Transfer fee	Notes
1	GK	(Scotland)	Allan McGregor	28	1998	187	0	2013	Youth system	
2	MF	(United States)	Maurice Edu	24	2008	36	4	2013	£2.6m	
3	DF	(Scotland)	David Weir (captain)	39	2007 (Winter)	177	5	2010	Free	
4	MF	(Portugal)	Pedro Mendes	31	2008	50	4	2011	£3m	left on 30 January
5	DF	(Bosnia and Herzegovina)	Saša Papac	30	2006	155	4	2011	£0.45m	
6	MF	(Scotland)	Lee McCulloch	31	2007	113	14	2011	£2.25m	
7	MF	(Northern Ireland)	Steven Davis	25	2008	119	12	2012	£3m	
8	MF	(Scotland)	Kevin Thomson	25	2007 (Winter)	109	3	2011	£2m	
9	FW	(Scotland)	Kris Boyd	26	2005 (Winter)	192	128	2010	£0.4m	
10	FW	(Spain)	Nacho Novo	31	2004	255	71	2010	£0.45m	
11	MF	(France)	Jérôme Rothen	32	2009	8	0	2010	Loan	left on 29 January
14	FW	(Scotland)	Steven Naismith	23	2008	81	9	2012	£1.9m	
16	DF	(Scotland)	Steven Whittaker	25	2007	129	19	2012	£2m	
17	FW	(Lithuania)	Andrius Velička	31	2008	11	5	2011	£1m	out on season loan
18	FW	(Scotland)	Kenny Miller	30	2008	121	45	2011	£2m	
19	MF	(Spain)	Aarón Ñíguez	20	2008	5	2	2010	Loan	left on 30 August
20	MF	(United States)	DaMarcus Beasley	27	2007	47	7	2010	£0.7m	
21	DF	(Scotland)	Kirk Broadfoot	25	2007	84	1	2010	Free	
22	DF	(Scotland)	Andy Webster	28	2008	1	1	2011	£0.4m	out on season loan
24	DF	(Algeria)	Madjid Bougherra	27	2008	62	3	2012	£2.5m	
25	GK	(Scotland)	Neil Alexander	32	2008 (Winter)	38	0	2011	Free	
26	DF	(Scotland)	Steven Smith	24	2002	75	1	2010	Youth system	
27	FW	(Northern Ireland)	Kyle Lafferty	22	2008	71	16	2013	£3.25m	
29	MF	(Scotland)	John Fleck	18	2007	36	3	2013	Youth system	
41	GK	(Scotland)	Scott Gallacher	20	2006	0	0	2010	Youth system	
45	FW	(Scotland)	Rory Loy	22	2006	1	0	2011	£0.025m	
47	DF	(Scotland)	Jordan McMillan	21	2005	1	0	2010	Youth system	
48	FW	(Northern Ireland)	Andrew Little	20	2006	11	1	2011	Youth system	
66	DF	(Scotland)	Danny Wilson	18	2007	24	1	2011	Youth system	
69	MF	(Scotland)	Gregg Wylde	19	2007	2	0	2012	Youth system	

- Last updated: 9 May 2010
- Source: Players transfer, Wikipedia players' articles,

Football Squads (for appearances, goals and player's number)

- Ordered by position on pitch.

=== Transfers ===
==== In ====
No.	Pos.	Nat.	Name	Age	Moving from	Type	Transfer window	Ends	Transfer fee	Source
11	MF	(France)	Jérôme Rothen	31	Paris Saint-Germain (France)	Loan	Summer	2010	n/a	

Last updated: 24 May 2010
Total spending: £0

==== Out ====
No.	Pos.	Nat.	Name	Age	Moving to	Type	Transfer window	Transfer fee	Source
7	MF	(Algeria)	Brahim Hemdani	31	Retired	End of contract	Summer	Free	
23	DF	(Scotland)	Christian Dailly	35	Charlton Athletic (England)	End of contract	Summer	Free	
46	MF	(South Africa)	Dean Furman	20	Oldham Athletic (England)	End of contract	Summer	£0.05m	
48	DF	(Scotland)	William McLachlan	20	Clyde	End of contract	Summer	Free	
50	FW	(Scotland)	Chris Craig	20	Dumbarton	End of contract	Summer	Free	
40	GK	(Scotland)	Lee Robinson	22	Kilmarnock	End of contract	Summer	Free	
49	DF	(Scotland)	Ross Harvey	20	Dumbarton	End of contract	Summer	Free	
60	GK	(Latvia)	Artūrs Vaičulis	21	AEP Paphos (Cyprus)	End of contract	Summer	Free	
54	MF	(Cyprus)	Georgios Efrem	19	Omonia Nicosia (Cyprus)	End of contract	Summer	Free	
16	GK	(Scotland)	Graeme Smith	26	St Johnstone	Transfer	Summer	Free	
22	DF	(Scotland)	Andy Webster	27	Dundee United	Loan	Summer	n/a	
6	MF	(Scotland)	Barry Ferguson	31	Birmingham City (England)	Transfer	Summer	£1.25m	
11	MF	(Scotland)	Charlie Adam	23	Blackpool (England)	Transfer	Summer	£1.35m	
15	MF	(Scotland)	Alan Gow	26	Plymouth Argyle (England)	Transfer	Summer	£0.2m	
17	FW	(Lithuania)	Andrius Velička	30	Bristol City (England)	Loan	Summer	n/a	
46	DF	(Scotland)	Steven Kinniburgh	20	Oxford United (England)	Loan	Summer	n/a	
54	DF	(Scotland)	Ross Perry	19	Oxford United (England)	Loan	Summer	n/a	
19	MF	(Spain)	Aarón Ñíguez	20	Valencia (Spain)	Loan Return	Summer	n/a	
50	FW	(Turkey)	Isa Bagci	19	Bursaspor (Turkey)	Transfer	Summer	Undisclosed	
62	GK	(Scotland)	Gary Inglis	17	Hamilton Academical	Loan	Summer	n/a	
47	DF	(Scotland)	Jordan McMillan	21	Queen of the South	Loan	n/a	n/a	
42	DF	(Scotland)	Alan Lowing	21	East Fife	End of contract	Winter	Free	
52	MF	(Scotland)	Andrew Shinnie	20	Dundee	Loan	Winter	n/a	
11	MF	(France)	Jérôme Rothen	31	Paris Saint-Germain (France)	Loan return	Winter	n/a	
45	FW	(Scotland)	Rory Loy	21	St Mirren	Loan	Winter	n/a	
4	MF	(Portugal)	Pedro Mendes	30	Sporting CP (Portugal)	Transfer	Winter	£1.5m	
43	FW	(Scotland)	Steven Lennon	22	Lincoln City (England)	Loan	Winter	n/a	
44	MF	(Scotland)	Paul Emslie	21	Peterhead	Loan	Winter	n/a	
53	MF	(England)	Tom Miller	19	Dundalk (Republic of Ireland)	Transfer	n/a	Free	

Last updated: 19 February 2010
Total income: £4,350,000

=== Squad statistics ===
				Total			Scottish Premier League		UEFA Champions League		Scottish Cup		League Cup	
No.	Pos.	Nat.	Name	Sts	App	Gls	App	Gls	App	Gls	App	Gls	App	Gls
1	GK	(Scotland)	Allan McGregor	46	46		34		6		6			
2	MF	(United States)	Maurice Edu	10	20	2	15	2			4		1	
3	DF	(Scotland)	David Weir	51	51		38		5		5		3	
4	MF	(Portugal)	Pedro Mendes	8	8		4		3				1	
5	DF	(Bosnia and Herzegovina)	Saša Papac	47	47	2	34	2	6		4		3	
6	MF	(Scotland)	Lee McCulloch	44	47	7	34	5	6	1	4		3	1
7	MF	(Northern Ireland)	Steven Davis	50	50	4	36	3	6		5		3	1
8	MF	(Scotland)	Kevin Thomson	35	39		25		6		4		4	
9	CF	(Scotland)	Kris Boyd	33	40	26	31	23	2		5	3	2	
10	CF	(Spain)	Nacho Novo	20	49	9	35	6	6	1	4	1	4	1
11	LW	(France)	Jérôme Rothen	7	8		4		3				1	
14	FW	(Scotland)	Steven Naismith	28	39	4	28	3	4		3		4	1
16	DF	(Scotland)	Steven Whittaker	47	50	11	35	7	6		5	3	4	1
18	FW	(Scotland)	Kenny Miller	39	45	21	33	18	5		6	2	1	1
20	LW	(United States)	DaMarcus Beasley	9	14	2	9	2	2		2		1	
21	DF	(Scotland)	Kirk Broadfoot	15	16		12				4			
24	DF	(Algeria)	Madjid Bougherra	22	23	2	17	1	3	1	2		1	
25	GK	(Scotland)	Neil Alexander	8	9		5						4	
26	DF	(Scotland)	Steven Smith	12	18		12		1		2		3	
27	FW	(Northern Ireland)	Kyle Lafferty	25	39	7	28	7	4		5		2	
29	MF	(Scotland)	John Fleck	12	23	2	15	1	3		3		2	1
47	DF	(Scotland)	Jordan McMillan	1	1								1	
48	FW	(Northern Ireland)	Andrew Little	3	10	1	6	1			3		1	
66	DF	(Scotland)	Danny Wilson	24	24	1	14	1	2		5		3	
69	MF	(Scotland)	Gregg Wylde		2		2							

Last updated: 9 May 2010
Source: Soccerbase - Rangers 2009/2010 player appearances
Ordered by squad numbers
0 shown as blank

=== Goal scorers ===
N	P	Nat.	Name	League	Scottish Cup	League Cup	Europe	Total
9	FW	(Scotland)	Kris Boyd	23	3			26
18	FW	(Scotland)	Kenny Miller	18	2	1		21
16	DF	(Scotland)	Steven Whittaker	7	1	3		11
10	FW	(Spain)	Nacho Novo	6	1	1	1	9
6	MF	(Scotland)	Lee McCulloch	5		1	1	7
27	FW	(Northern Ireland)	Kyle Lafferty	7				7
14	FW	(Scotland)	Steven Naismith	3		1		4
7	MF	(Northern Ireland)	Steven Davis	3		1		4
20	MF	(United States)	DaMarcus Beasley	2				2
24	DF	(Algeria)	Madjid Bougherra	1			1	2
29	MF	(Scotland)	John Fleck	1		1		2
5	DF	(Bosnia and Herzegovina)	Saša Papac	2				2
2	MF	(United States)	Maurice Edu	2				2
48	FW	(Northern Ireland)	Andrew Little	1				1
66	DF	(Scotland)	Danny Wilson	1				1

Last updated: 9 May 2010
Source: Match reports
Only competitive matches

=== Disciplinary record ===
N	P	Nat.	Name	YC	Yellow card Red card	RC
3	DF	(Scotland)	David Weir	5		
4	MF	(Portugal)	Pedro Mendes	2	1	
5	DF	(Bosnia and Herzegovina)	Saša Papac	10		
6	MF	(Scotland)	Lee McCulloch	15	1	
7	MF	(Northern Ireland)	Steven Davis	1		
8	MF	(Scotland)	Kevin Thomson	5		2
9	FW	(Scotland)	Kris Boyd	8		
10	FW	(Spain)	Nacho Novo	1		
14	FW	(Scotland)	Steven Naismith	8		
16	DF	(Scotland)	Steven Whittaker	7		
18	FW	(Scotland)	Kenny Miller	5		1
21	DF	(Scotland)	Kirk Broadfoot	2		
24	DF	(Algeria)	Madjid Bougherra	4	1	
26	DF	(Scotland)	Steven Smith	1		
27	FW	(Northern Ireland)	Kyle Lafferty	5		
29	MF	(Scotland)	John Fleck	2		
48	FW	(Northern Ireland)	Andrew Little	1		
66	DF	(Scotland)	Danny Wilson	1		1

Last updated: 9 May 2010
Source: Match reports
Only competitive matches

== Club ==
=== Board of directors ===
Position	Staff
Chairman	(Scotland) David Murray (until 26 August) (Scotland) Alastair Johnston (from 26 August)
Chief executive	(Scotland) Martin Bain
Finance director	(Scotland) Donald McIntyre
Non-executive director	(Scotland) John Greig
Non-executive director	(Scotland) John McClelland
Non-executive director	(Scotland) Dave King
Non-executive director	(Scotland) Mike McGill (from 16 October)
Non-executive director	(Scotland) Donald Muir (from 16 October)
Non-executive director	(Scotland) Paul Murray
Non-executive director	(Scotland) Donald Wilson (until 16 October)

Source: Wikipedia article

=== Coaching staff ===
Position	Staff
Manager	(Scotland) Walter Smith
Assistant manager	(Scotland) Ally McCoist
First-team coach	(Scotland) Kenny McDowall
First-team coach	(Scotland) Ian Durrant
Head of Sports Science	(Wales) Adam Owen
Goalkeepers coach	(Scotland) Jim Stewart

Source: Wikipedia article

=== Other staff ===
Position	Staff
Head of Football; Administration	(Scotland) Andrew Dickson
Physiotherapist	(Scotland) Philip Yeates
Doctor	(Scotland) Dr Paul Jackson
Chief scout	(Scotland) Ewan Chester
Massuer	(Scotland) David Lavery
Kit controller	(Scotland) Jimmy Bell
Video analyst	(Scotland) Steve Harvey

Source: Wikipedia article

== Matches ==
=== Pre-season and friendlies ===
Game	Date	Tournament	Round	Ground	Opponent	Score^{1}	Report
1	26 July 2009	Friendly		A	(Germany) 1. FC Nürnberg	2–0	Report / Report link; Kick off / 16:00 GMT; Attendance / 27,211; Referee / (Germany) Robert Hartmann; 1. FC Nürnberg / Rangers; / 48' Naismith; 71' Novo
2	28 July 2009	Friendly		A	(Germany) SC Wiedenbrück	3–0	Report / Report link; Kick off / 19:45 GMT; Attendance / 2,500; SC Wiedenbrück / Rangers; / 70' Velička; 75' Ñíguez; 89' (pen.) Ñíguez
3	1 August 2009	Emirates Cup	Day 1	N	(France) Paris Saint-Germain	1–0	Report / Report link; Kick off / 14:00 BST; Attendance / 54,121; Referee / (Republic of Ireland) Alan Kelly; Rangers / Paris Saint-Germain; 76' Bougherra
4	2 August 2009	Emirates Cup	Day 2	A	(England) Arsenal	0–3	Report / Report link; Kick off / 16:15 BST; Attendance / 56,758; Referee / (England) Mike Dean; Arsenal / Rangers; 2' Wilshere; 11' Eduardo; 72' Wilshere
5	5 August 2009	Friendly		H	(England) Manchester City	3–2	Report / Report link; Kick off / 19:45 BST; Attendance / 35,120; Referee / (Scotland) Craig Thomson; Rangers / Manchester City; 20' Novo; 55' Miller; 90' Weir / 27' Ireland; 53' Petrov
6	8 August 2009	Friendly		A	(England) Portsmouth	0–2	Report / Report link; Kick off / 15:00 BST; Attendance / 9,018; Referee / (England) Lee Probert; Portsmouth / Rangers; 31' Piquionne; 51' Piquionne

Last updated: 8 August 2009
Source: Wikipedia article
^{1}Rangers goals come first.
National flags for Ground and Opponent columns are only shown when different from that of Rangers.
M = Match; Ground: H = Home, A = Away, N = Neutral, HR = Home replacement, AR = Away replacement.

=== Scottish Premier League ===
Game	Date	Tournament	Round	Ground	Opponent	Score^{1}	Report
1	15 August 2009	Scottish Premier League	1	H	Falkirk	4–1	Report / Report link; Kick off / 15:00 BST; Attendance / 50,239; Referee / Mike Tumilty (Scotland); Rangers / Falkirk; 14' McCulloch; 34' Miller; 72' Miller; 83' Naismith / 24' Finnigan
2	23 August 2009	Scottish Premier League	2	A	Heart of Midlothian	2–1	Report / Report link; Kick off / 12:45 BST; Attendance / 16,284; Referee / Craig Thomson (Scotland); Heart of Midlothian / Rangers; 31' Witteveen / (red card) 13' Thomson; 63' McCulloch; 90' (pen.) Boyd
3	29 August 2009	Scottish Premier League	3	H	Hamilton Academical	4–1	Report / Report link; Kick off / 15:00 BST; Attendance / 47,633; Referee / Stevie O'Reilly (Scotland); Rangers / Hamilton Academical; 19' Whittaker; 27' Boyd; 65' Boyd; 67' Whittaker / 87' McLaughlin
4	12 September 2009	Scottish Premier League	4	A	Motherwell	0–0	Report / Report link; Kick off / 12:15 BST; Attendance / 9,355; Referee / Dougie McDonald (Scotland); Motherwell / Rangers; / (yellow card) 86' (red card) Bougherra
6	19 September 2009	Scottish Premier League	5	A	Kilmarnock	0–0	Report / Report link; Kick off / 12:30 BST; Attendance / 10,310; Referee / Steve Conroy (Scotland); Kilmarnock / Rangers; / (red card) 43' Mendes
8	26 September 2009	Scottish Premier League	6	H	Aberdeen	0–0	Report / Report link; Kick off / 15:00 BST; Attendance / 47,968; Referee / Iain Brines (Scotland)
10	4 October 2009	Scottish Premier League	7	H	Celtic	2–1	Report / Report link; Kick off / 12:30 BST; Attendance / 50,276; Referee / Craig Thomson (Scotland); Rangers / Celtic; 8' Miller; 16' Miller / 25' (pen.) McGeady
11	17 October 2009	Scottish Premier League	8	A	St Johnstone	2–1	Report / Report link; Kick off / 12:30 BST; Attendance / 7,807; Referee / William Collum (Scotland); St Johnstone / Rangers; 17' Samuel / 40' Boyd; 83' Papac
13	24 October 2009	Scottish Premier League	9	H	Hibernian	1–1	Report / Report link; Kick off / 15:00 BST; Attendance / 46,892; Referee / Charlie Richmond (Scotland); Rangers / Hibernian; 8' Boyd / 63' Stokes
16	7 November 2009	Scottish Premier League	11	H	St Mirren	2–1	Report / Report link; Kick off / 15:00 GMT; Attendance / 45,750; Referee / Iain Brines (Scotland); Rangers / St Mirren; 1' Boyd; 57' Boyd / 88' O'Donnell
17	21 November 2009	Scottish Premier League	12	H	Kilmarnock	3–0	Report / Report link; Kick off / 15:00 GMT; Attendance / 45,358; Referee / Alan Muir (Scotland); Rangers / Kilmarnock; 7' Boyd; 25' Miller; 35' Whittaker
19	28 November 2009	Scottish Premier League	13	A	Aberdeen	0–1	Report / Report link; Kick off / 12:45 GMT; Attendance / 16,153; Referee / Craig Thomson (Scotland); Aberdeen / Rangers; 17' Miller
20	5 December 2009	Scottish Premier League	14	A	Falkirk	3–1	Report / Report link; Kick off / 12:30 GMT; Attendance / 6,903; Referee / William Collum (Scotland); Falkirk / Rangers; 41' Moutinho / 17' Boyd; 36' Boyd; 74' (pen.) Miller
22	12 December 2009	Scottish Premier League	15	H	St Johnstone	3–0	Report / Report link; Kick off / 15:00 GMT; Attendance / 44,662; Referee / Dougie McDonald (Scotland); Rangers / St Johnstone; 1' Boyd; 27' (pen.) Boyd; 51' Novo
23	15 December 2009	Scottish Premier League	10	A	Dundee United	3–0	Report / Report link; Kick off / 19:45 GMT; Attendance / 10,037; Referee / Mike Tumilty (Scotland); Dundee United / Rangers; / 26' Beasley; 58' Miller; 75' Miller
24	19 December 2009	Scottish Premier League	16	H	Motherwell	6–1	Report / Report link; Kick off / 15:00 GMT; Attendance / 44,291; Referee / Craig Thomson (Scotland); Rangers / Motherwell; 5' Miller; 53' Boyd; 58' Miller; 75' Lafferty; 84' Beasley; 88' Lafferty / 67' Hutchinson
25	27 December 2009	Scottish Premier League	17	A	Hibernian	4–1	Report / Report link; Kick off / 12:00 GMT; Attendance / 16,894; Referee / Iain Brines (Scotland); Hibernian / Rangers; 1' Stokes / 21' Miller; 37' Boyd; 53' Novo; 66' Miller
26	30 December 2009	Scottish Premier League	18	H	Dundee United	7–1	Report / Report link; Kick off / 19:45 GMT; Attendance / 48,721; Referee / William Collum (Scotland); Rangers / Dundee United; 20' (pen.) Boyd; 25' Boyd; 29' Boyd; (red card) 51' Miller; 68' Whittaker; 75' Boyd; 80' Boyd; 85' Bougherra / 46' Casalinuovo
27	3 January 2010	Scottish Premier League	19	A	Celtic	1–1	Report / Report link; Kick off / 12:30 GMT; Attendance / 58,300; Referee / Steve Conroy (Scotland); Celtic / Rangers; 79' McDonald / 81' McCulloch
29	16 January 2010	Scottish Premier League	20	A	Hamilton Academical	1–0	Report / Report link; Kick off / 12:30 GMT; Attendance / 5,343; Referee / Mike Tumilty (Scotland); Hamilton Academical / Rangers; / 78' Novo
31	23 January 2010	Scottish Premier League	21	H	Heart of Midlothian	1–1	Report / Report link; Kick off / 15:00 GMT; Attendance / 47,031; Referee / Calum Murray (Scotland); Rangers / Heart of Midlothian; 90+1' Little / 75' Robinson
32	27 January 2010	Scottish Premier League	22	A	St Mirren	2–0	Report / Report link; Kick off / 19:45 GMT; Attendance / 5,260; Referee / Craig Thomson (Scotland); St Mirren / Rangers; / 2' Davis; 86' Novo
33	30 January 2010	Scottish Premier League	23	H	Falkirk	3–0	Report / Report link; Kick off / 15:00 GMT; Attendance / 45,907; Referee / Crawford Allan (Scotland); Rangers / Falkirk; 18' Davis; 57' Fleck; 62' Whittaker
36	10 February 2010	Scottish Premier League	24	A	Motherwell	1–1	Report / Report link; Kick off / 19:45 GMT; Attendance / 9,352; Referee / Calum Murray (Scotland); Motherwell / Rangers; 28' Hateley / 80' Boyd
37	14 February 2010	Scottish Premier League	25	H	Hibernian	3–0	Report / Report link; Kick off / 13:30 GMT; Attendance / 48,161; Referee / Steve Conroy (Scotland); Rangers / Hibernian; 50' Whittaker; 72' (pen.) Boyd; 90+1' Miller
39	28 February 2010	Scottish Premier League	27	H	Celtic	1–0	Report / Report link; Kick off / 12:30 GMT; Attendance / 50,320; Referee / Dougie McDonald (Scotland); Rangers / Celtic; 90+3' Edu
40	6 March 2010	Scottish Premier League	28	H	St Mirren	3–1	Report / Report link; Kick off / 15:00 GMT; Attendance / 47,474; Referee / Charlie Richmond (Scotland); Rangers / St Mirren; 32' McCulloch; 46' McCulloch; 78' Novo / 30' Carey
41	9 March 2010	Scottish Premier League	29	A	Kilmarnock	2–0	Report / Report link; Kick off / 19:45 GMT; Attendance / 8,906; Referee / Alan Muir (Scotland); Kilmarnock / Rangers; / 55' Whittaker; 61' Miller
45	27 March 2010	Scottish Premier League	31	A	Heart of Midlothian	4–1	Report / Report link; Kick off / 12:30 GMT; Attendance / 16,832; Referee / Calum Murray (Scotland); Heart of Midlothian / Rangers; 16' Suso / 5' Wilson; 31' Miller; 49' Naismith; 77' Naismith
46	30 March 2010	Scottish Premier League	26	A	St Johnstone	1–4	Report / Report link; Kick off / 19:45 BST; Attendance / 6,189; Referee / Mike Tumilty (Scotland); St Johnstone / Rangers; 7' Sheridan; 12' Millar; 36' Craig; 79' Davidson / 16' Papac
47	3 April 2010	Scottish Premier League	32	H	Hamilton Academical	1–0	Report / Report link; Kick off / 15:00 BST; Attendance / 48,068; Referee / Stevie O'Reilly (Scotland); Rangers / Hamilton Academical; 11' Edu
48	7 April 2010	Scottish Premier League	30	H	Aberdeen	3–1	Report / Report link; Kick off / 19:45 BST; Attendance / 47,061; Referee / William Collum (Scotland); Rangers / Aberdeen; 24' Davis; 65' Lafferty; 76' Miller / 68' Mackie
49	14 April 2010	Scottish Premier League	33	A	Dundee United	0–0	Report / Report link; Kick off / 19:45 BST; Attendance / 11,100; Referee / Brian Winter (Scotland)
50	18 April 2010	Scottish Premier League	34	H	Heart of Midlothian	2–0	Report / Report link; Kick off / 12:30 BST; Attendance / 47,590; Referee / Iain Brines (Scotland); Rangers / Heart of Midlothian; 54' Lafferty; 84' (pen.) Miller
51	25 April 2010	Scottish Premier League	35	A	Hibernian	1–0	Report / Report link; Kick off / 14:30 BST; Attendance / 10,573; Referee / William Collum (Scotland); Hibernian / Rangers; / 17' Lafferty
52	1 May 2010	Scottish Premier League	36	A	Dundee United	2–1	Report / Report link; Kick off / 15:00 BST; Attendance / 10,003; Referee / Stevie O'Reilly (Scotland); Dundee United / Rangers; 80' Casalinuovo / 2' Boyd; 41' Novo
53	4 May 2010	Scottish Premier League	37	A	Celtic	1–2	Report / Report link; Kick off / 19:45 BST; Attendance / 58,000; Referee / Calum Murray (Scotland); Celtic / Rangers; 8' Naylor; 45' Fortuné / 43' Miller; (yellow card) 90+1' (red card) McCulloch
54	9 May 2010	Scottish Premier League	38	H	Motherwell	3–3	Report / Report link; Kick off / 13:30 BST; Attendance / 50,321; Referee / Brian Winter (Scotland); Rangers / Motherwell; 17' Boyd; 40' Lafferty; 70' Lafferty / 51' Murphy; 90' Jennings; 90+3' (pen.) Jutkiewicz

Last updated: 9 May 2010
Source: Wikipedia article
^{1}Rangers goals come first.
National flags for Ground and Opponent columns are only shown when different from that of Rangers.
M = Match; Ground: H = Home, A = Away, N = Neutral, HR = Home replacement, AR = Away replacement.

=== Scottish League Cup ===
Game	Date	Tournament	Round	Ground	Opponent	Score^{1}	Report
7	23 September 2009	League Cup	3	A	Queen of the South	2–1	Report / Report link; Kick off / 19:35 BST; Attendance / 6,120; Referee / William Collum (Scotland); Queen of the South / Rangers; 90+1' Harris / 16' Naismith; 79' Novo
14	27 October 2009	League Cup	QF	A	Dundee	3–1	Report / Report link; Kick off / 19:45 GMT; Attendance / 10,654; Referee / Dougie McDonald (Scotland); Dundee / Rangers; 29' Griffiths / 15' Whittaker; 57' MacKenzie (o.g.); 85' Fleck
34	3 February 2010	League Cup	SF	N	St Johnstone	2–0	Report / Report link; Kick off / 19:35 GMT; Attendance / 17,371; Referee / Dougie McDonald (Scotland); Rangers / St Johnstone; 26' Davis; 37' McCulloch
43	21 March 2010	League Cup	F	N	St Mirren	1–0	Report / Report link; Kick off / 15:00 GMT; Attendance / 44,538; Referee / Craig Thomson (Scotland); St Mirren / Rangers; / (red card) 53' Thomson; (red card) 71' Wilson; 84' Miller

Last updated: 21 March 2010
Source: Wikipedia article
^{1}Rangers goals come first.
National flags for Ground and Opponent columns are only shown when different from that of Rangers.
M = Match; Ground: H = Home, A = Away, N = Neutral, HR = Home replacement, AR = Away replacement.

=== Scottish Cup ===
Game	Date	Tournament	Round	Ground	Opponent	Score^{1}	Report
28	10 January 2010	Scottish Cup	4	A	Hamilton Academical	3–3	Report / Report link; Kick off / 12:15 GMT; Attendance / 3,940; Referee / Charlie Richmond (Scotland); Hamilton Academical / Rangers; 39' (pen.) Mensing; 45+1' Paixão; 45+3' Antoine-Curier / 4' Whittaker; 30' Miller; 63' (pen.) Miller
30	19 January 2010	Scottish Cup	4 R	H	Hamilton Academical	2–0	Report / Report link; Kick off / 19:45 GMT; Attendance / 21,856; Referee / Charlie Richmond (Scotland); Rangers / Hamilton Academical; 98' Whittaker; 99' Whittaker
35	6 February 2010	Scottish Cup	5	A	St Mirren	0–0	Report / Report link; Kick off / 12:30 GMT; Attendance / 4,909; Referee / Iain Brines (Scotland)
38	17 February 2010	Scottish Cup	5 R	H	St Mirren	1–0	Report / Report link; Kick off / 19:45 GMT; Attendance / 31,086; Referee / Iain Brines (Scotland); Rangers / St Mirren; 86' Boyd
42	14 March 2010	Scottish Cup	QF	H	Dundee United	3–3	Report / Report link; Kick off / 12:05 GMT; Attendance / 24,096; Referee / Dougie McDonald (Scotland); Rangers / Dundee United; 34' (pen.) Boyd; 43' (pen.) Boyd; 48' Novo / 24' Shala; 63' (o.g.) Whittaker; 80' Kovačević
44	24 March 2010	Scottish Cup	QF R	A	Dundee United	0–1	Report / Report link; Kick off / 19:45 GMT; Attendance / 11,898; Referee / Dougie McDonald (Scotland); Dundee United / Rangers; 90' D.Robertson

Last updated: 24 March 2010
Source: Wikipedia article
^{1}Rangers goals come first.
National flags for Ground and Opponent columns are only shown when different from that of Rangers.
M = Match; Ground: H = Home, A = Away, N = Neutral, HR = Home replacement, AR = Away replacement.

=== UEFA Champions League ===
Game	Date	Tournament	Round	Ground	Opponent	Score^{1}	Report
5	16 September 2009	UEFA Champions League	GS	A	(Germany) VfB Stuttgart	1–1	Report / Report link; Kick off / 19:45 BST; Attendance / 51,000; Referee / (Switzerland) Massimo Busacca; VfB Stuttgart / Rangers; 18' Pogrebnyak / 77' Bougherra
9	29 September 2009	UEFA Champions League	GS	H	(Spain) Sevilla	1–4	Report / Report link; Kick off / 19:45 BST; Attendance / 40,572; Referee / (Sweden) Jonas Eriksson; Rangers / Sevilla; 88' Novo / 50' Konko; 64' Adriano; 72' Luís Fabiano; 74' Kanouté
12	20 October 2009	UEFA Champions League	GS	H	(Romania) Unirea Urziceni	1–4	Report / Report link; Kick off / 19:45 BST; Attendance / 37,500; Referee / (Netherlands) Eric Braamhaar; Rangers / Unirea Urziceni; 2' (o.g.) Vilana / 33' Bilaşco; 50' (o.g.) Lafferty; 59' (o.g.) McCulloch; 65' Brandán
15	4 November 2009	UEFA Champions League	GS	AR	(Romania) Unirea Urziceni	1–1	Report / Report link; Kick off / 19:45 GMT; Attendance / 9,923; Referee / (Denmark) Claus Bo Larsen; Unirea Urziceni / Rangers; 88' Onofraș / 79' McCulloch
18	24 November 2009	UEFA Champions League	GS	H	(Germany) VfB Stuttgart	0–2	Report / Report link; Kick off / 19:45 GMT; Attendance / 41,468; Referee / (Italy) Roberto Rosetti; Rangers / VfB Stuttgart; / 16' Rudy; 59' Kuzmanović
21	9 December 2009	UEFA Champions League	GS	A	(Spain) Sevilla	0–1	Report / Report link; Kick off / 19:45 GMT; Attendance / 38,000; Referee / (France) Bertrand Layec; Sevilla / Rangers; 8' (pen.) Kanouté

Last updated: 9 December 2009
Source: Wikipedia article
^{1}Rangers goals come first.
National flags for Ground and Opponent columns are only shown when different from that of Rangers.
M = Match; Ground: H = Home, A = Away, N = Neutral, HR = Home replacement, AR = Away replacement.

== Competitions ==
=== Overall ===
Competition	Started round	Current position / round	Final position / round	First match	Last match
Scottish Premier League	—	—	1st	15 August	9 May
UEFA Champions League	Group stage	—	Group stage	16 September	9 December
League Cup	3rd round	—	Winners	23 September	21 March
Scottish Cup	4th Round	—	Quarter-finals	10 January	24 March

Source: Competitions

=== Scottish Premier League ===
==== Standings ====
Pos	Team	Pld	W	D	L	GF	GA	GD	Pts	Qualification or relegation
1	Rangers (C)	38	26	9	3	82	28	+54	87	Qualification for the Champions League group stage
2	Celtic	38	25	6	7	75	39	+36	81	Qualification for the Champions League third qualifying round
3	Dundee United	38	17	12	9	55	47	+8	63	Qualification for the Europa League play-off round (Note: by winning the Scottish Cup.)
4	Hibernian	38	15	9	14	58	55	+3	54	Qualification for the Europa League third qualifying round
5	Motherwell	38	13	14	11	52	54	−2	53	Qualification for the Europa League second qualifying round

Source: SPFL Archive
Rules for classification: 1) points; 2) goal difference; 3) number of goals scored.
(C) Champions

==== Results summary ====
Overall								Home						Away					
Pld	W	D	L	GF	GA	GD	Pts	W	D	L	GF	GA	GD	W	D	L	GF	GA	GD
38	26	9	3	82	28	+54	87	15	4	0	52	13	+39	11	5	3	30	15	+15

Last updated: 9 May 2010.
Source: Wikipedia article

==== Results by round ====
Round	1	2	3	4	5	6	7	8	9	10	11	12	13	14	15	16	17	18	19	20	21	22	23	24	25	26	27	28	29	30	31	32	33	34	35	36	37	38
Ground	H	A	H	A	A	H	H	A	H	A	H	H	A	A	H	H	A	H	A	A	H	A	H	A	H	A	H	H	A	H	A	H	A	H	A	A	A	H
Result	W	W	W	D	D	D	W	W	D	W	W	W	L	W	W	W	W	W	D	W	D	W	W	D	W	L	W	W	W	W	W	W	D	W	W	W	L	D
Position	1	2	1	1	2	2	2	1	2	1	2	1	2	2	2	1	1	1	1	1	1	1	1	1	1	1	1	1	1	1	1	1	1	1	1	1	1	1

Updated to match(es) played on 9 May 2010. Source: Wikipedia article
A = Away; H = Home; W = Win; D = Draw; L = Loss

=== UEFA Champions League ===
==== Group G ====
Pos	Team	Pld	W	D	L	GF	GA	GD	Pts	Qualification
1	(Spain) Sevilla	6	4	1	1	11	4	+7	13	Advance to knockout phase
2	(Germany) VfB Stuttgart	6	2	3	1	9	7	+2	9	Advance to knockout phase
3	(Romania) Unirea Urziceni	6	2	2	2	8	8	0	8	Transfer to Europa League
4	(Scotland) Rangers	6	0	2	4	4	13	−9	2	

Source: RSSSF
