= 2008–09 Rangers F.C. season =

Rangers
2008–09 season
- Chairman: David Murray
- Manager: Walter Smith
- Ground: Ibrox Stadium
- Scottish Premier League: 1st
- Scottish Cup: Winners
- League Cup: Runners-up
- Champions League: Second qualifying round
- Top goalscorer: League: Kris Boyd (27); All: Kris Boyd (31)
- Highest home attendance: 50,403 vs Celtic (27 December)
- Lowest home attendance: 27,588 vs Hamilton Academical (8 March)
Home colours	Away colours	Third colours

The 2008–09 season was the 129th season of competitive football by Rangers.

== Overview ==
Rangers played a total of 49 competitive matches during the 2008–09 season. The season began disastrously as the club exited the UEFA Champions League and European football altogether, losing 2–1 on aggregate to Lithuanian side FBK Kaunas in the second qualifying round. The first leg at Ibrox finished goalless, but the return leg ended in defeat for Rangers after an 87th-minute header from Linas Pilibaitis. The financial consequences of the failures to qualify for the Champions League were revealed when the club posted a loss of £3.9m for the six months to December 2008, and in March decided to offer staff the option of voluntary redundancy as a way of cutting costs. There was also mounting pressure on the manager to reduce the first team squad from 28 players to a more manageable figure. The player excess was eased slightly with the departures of Chris Burke, Jean-Claude Darcheville and a couple out on loan deals but the increased debt meant that the club needed to find a cash injection. This resulted in the attempted sale of Kris Boyd to Birmingham City which fell through due to the players wage demands.

In the first Old Firm game of the season, Rangers won 4–2, with Pedro Mendes scoring his first goal for the club, and Kenny Miller scoring a double against his former employers. But the team's league form stuttered thereafter. Despite a run of five wins from six matches following the Old Firm victory, the side trailed Celtic by seven points in the league at the turn of the year. For the first few months of 2009 both sides dropped and gained points on the other and Rangers briefly took over top spot of the Scottish Premier League on 21 February after a win against Kilmarnock. The spell as league leaders lasted less than a fortnight. A defeat and a draw, both at home, to Inverness and Hearts respectively, saw Smith's side sit second in the table, one point behind Celtic, at the split. The fourth Old Firm league meeting of the season finished with a 1–0 win to Rangers, thanks to a Steven Davis strike. This meant that, with three league games remaining, Rangers were two points ahead of Celtic. Further twists and turns followed, both Old Firm sides drew their matches against Hibernian at Easter Road, and so Rangers were ahead by two points with one round of matches remaining. Smith's side just needed a win against Dundee United to guarantee the club's 52nd league title. That is exactly what they got, goals from Kyle Lafferty, Pedro Mendes and Kris Boyd sealed a 3–0 win and the club's first league championship in four seasons.

The club played in the finals of both of the domestic cup competitions for the second season running. The 2009 Scottish League Cup Final was reached by defeating Partick Thistle, Hamilton and Falkirk en route but the final ended in a 2–0 defeat at the hands of Old Firm rivals Celtic. The match was Walter Smith's first ever Old Firm final and was marred by a Kirk Broadfoot sending off deep into extra time for a foul on Aidan McGeady inside the penalty box. Celtic were subsequently awarded a penalty which McGeady himself converted.

Rangers qualified for the 2009 Scottish Cup Final after beating St Mirren 3–0 in the semi-final. The second goal of the game was scored by Kris Boyd and was his 100th goal for Rangers. The team faced Falkirk at Hampden Park on 30 May 2009 in what was the club's 51st Scottish Cup Final appearance. A Nacho Novo strike in the first minute of the second half gave Rangers a 1–0 win and completed the domestic double.

== Players ==
=== Squad information ===
N	Pos.	Nat.	Name	Age	Since	App	Goals	Ends	Transfer fee	Notes
1	GK	(Scotland)	Allan McGregor	27	1998	141	0	2013	Youth system	
2	MF	(United States)	Maurice Edu	23	2008	16	2	2013	£2.6m	
3	DF	(Scotland)	David Weir (captain)	39	2007 (Winter)	126	5	2010	Free	
4	DF	(Spain)	Carlos Cuéllar	27	2007	65	5	2011	£2.37m	left on 12 August
4	MF	(Portugal)	Pedro Mendes	30	2008	42	4	2011	£3m	
5	DF	(Bosnia and Herzegovina)	Saša Papac	29	2006	108	2	2011	£0.45m	
6	MF	(Scotland)	Barry Ferguson	31	2005 (Winter)	431	61	2010	£4.5m	
7	MF	(Algeria)	Brahim Hemdani	31	2005	108	2	2009	Free	
8	MF	(Scotland)	Kevin Thomson	24	2007 (Winter)	70	3	2011	£2m	
9	FW	(Scotland)	Kris Boyd	25	2005 (Winter)	152	102	2010	£0.4m	
10	FW	(Spain)	Nacho Novo	30	2004	206	64	2010	£0.45m	
11	MF	(Scotland)	Charlie Adam	23	2003	87	18	2012	Youth system	
12	MF	(Scotland)	Lee McCulloch	31	2007	66	7	2011	£2.25m	
14	FW	(Scotland)	Steven Naismith	22	2008	42	5	2012	£1.9m	
15	MF	(Scotland)	Alan Gow	26	2007	2	0	2010	Free	
16	GK	(Scotland)	Graeme Smith	26	2007	1	0	2010	Free	
17	MF	(Scotland)	Chris Burke	25	2000	131	14	2009	Youth system	left on 12 January
18	FW	(Scotland)	Kenny Miller	29	2008	76	24	2011	£2m	
19	FW	(France)	Jean-Claude Darcheville	33	2007	59	16	2009	Free	left on 1 January
20	MF	(United States)	DaMarcus Beasley	27	2007	33	5	2010	£0.7m	
21	DF	(Scotland)	Kirk Broadfoot	24	2007	68	1	2010	Free	
22	DF	(Scotland)	Andy Webster	27	2008	1	1	2011	£0.4m	
23	DF	(Scotland)	Christian Dailly	35	2008 (Winter)	36	2	2009	Free	
24	DF	(Algeria)	Madjid Bougherra	26	2008	39	1	2012	£2.5m	
25	GK	(Scotland)	Neil Alexander	31	2008 (Winter)	29	0	2011	Free	
26	DF	(Scotland)	Steven Smith	23	2002	57	1	2010	Youth system	
27	FW	(Northern Ireland)	Kyle Lafferty	21	2008	32	9	2013	£3.25m	
28	DF	(Scotland)	Steven Whittaker	24	2007	79	8	2012	£2m	
29	FW	(Gabon)	Daniel Cousin	31	2007	44	13	2010	£1.1m	left on 1 September
31	MF	(Spain)	Aarón Ñíguez	20	2008	5	2	2010	Loan	
35	MF	(Northern Ireland)	Steven Davis	24	2008	69	8	2012	£3m	
37	FW	(Lithuania)	Andrius Velička	30	2008	11	5	2011	£1m	
45	FW	(Scotland)	Rory Loy	21	2006	1	0	2011	£0.025m	
53	MF	(Scotland)	John Fleck	17	2007	13	1	2011	Youth system	
56	FW	(Northern Ireland)	Andrew Little	20	2006	1	0	2011	Youth system	

- Last updated: 24 May 2009
- Source: Players transfer, Wikipedia players' articles,

Football Squads (for appearances, goals and player's number)

- Ordered by position on pitch.

=== Transfers ===
==== In ====
No.	Pos.	Nat.	Name	Age	Moving from	Type	Transfer window	Ends	Transfer fee	Source
22	DF	(Scotland)	Andy Webster	26	Wigan Athletic (England)	Transfer	Summer	2011	£0.45m	
18	FW	(Scotland)	Kenny Miller	28	Derby County (England)	Transfer	Summer	2011	£2m	
37	FW	(Lithuania)	Andrius Velička	29	Viking (Norway)	Transfer	Summer	2011	£1m	
27	FW	(Northern Ireland)	Kyle Lafferty	20	Burnley (England)	Transfer	Summer	2013	£3.25m	
24	DF	(Algeria)	Madjid Bougherra	25	Charlton Athletic (England)	Transfer	Summer	2012	£2.5m	
31	MF	(Spain)	Aarón Ñíguez	19	Valencia (Spain)	Loan	Summer	2010	n/a	
4	MF	(Portugal)	Pedro Mendes	29	Portsmouth (England)	Transfer	Summer	2011	£3m	
35	MF	(Northern Ireland)	Steven Davis	23	Fulham (England)	Transfer	Summer	2012	£3m	
2	MF	(United States)	Maurice Edu	22	Toronto FC (Canada)	Transfer	Summer	2013	£2.6m	

Last updated: 22 August 2008
Total spending: £17.8m

==== Out ====
No.	Pos.	Nat.	Name	Age	Moving to	Type	Transfer window	Transfer fee	Source
54	DF	(Scotland)	Nicholas Gallacher	18	Motherwell	End of contract	Summer	n/a	
57	FW	(Ivory Coast)	Lacine Cherif	17	Kilmarnock	End of contract	Summer	n/a	
55	MF	(Scotland)	Alistair Park	17	Hibernian	End of contract	Summer	n/a	
50	DF	(England)	Michael Donald	19	Free agent	End of contract	Summer	n/a	
31	GK	(Scotland)	Calum Reidford	21	Dunfermline Athletic	End of contract	Summer	n/a	
41	DF	(Scotland)	Chris Smith	19	Greenock Morton	End of contract	Summer	n/a	
52	MF	(Belgium)	Jeroen Van Den Broeck	19	AGOVV (Netherlands)	End of contract	Summer	n/a	
23	FW	(Slovakia)	Filip Šebo	24	Valenciennes (France)	Transfer	Summer	£1m	
4	MF	(Belgium)	Thomas Buffel	27	Cercle Brugge (Belgium)	Transfer	Summer	Free	
4	DF	(Spain)	Carlos Cuéllar	26	Aston Villa (England)	Transfer	Summer	£7.8m	
43	FW	(Scotland)	Steven Lennon	20	Partick Thistle	Loan	Summer	n/a	
80	GK	(Scotland)	Mark Weir	16	Kilmarnock	Loan	Summer	n/a	
22	DF	(Scotland)	Andy Webster	26	Bristol City (England)	Loan	Summer	n/a	
36	MF	(South Africa)	Dean Furman	20	Bradford City (England)	Loan	Summer	n/a	
42	DF	(Scotland)	Alan Lowing	20	Clyde	Loan	Summer	n/a	
44	MF	(Scotland)	Paul Emslie	20	Clyde	Loan	Summer	n/a	
41	GK	(Scotland)	Scott Gallacher	19	Cowdenbeath	Loan	Summer	n/a	
29	FW	(Gabon)	Daniel Cousin	31	Hull City (England)	Transfer	Summer	£3.5m	
15	MF	(Scotland)	Alan Gow	25	Blackpool (England)	Loan	Summer	n/a	
40	GK	(England)	Lee Robinson	22	St Johnstone	Loan	n/a	n/a	
52	MF	(Scotland)	Andrew Shinnie	19	Dundee	Loan	n/a	n/a	
55	DF	(Scotland)	Steven Kinniburgh	19	Queen of the South	Loan	n/a	n/a	
45	FW	(Scotland)	Rory Loy	20	Dunfermline Athletic	Loan	n/a	n/a	
48	DF	(Scotland)	William McLachlan	19	Airdrie United	Loan	n/a	n/a	
40	GK	(Scotland)	Lee Robinson	22	Queen of the South	Loan	n/a	n/a	
19	FW	(France)	Jean-Claude Darcheville	33	Valenciennes (France)	Transfer	Winter	Free	
47	DF	(Scotland)	Jordan McMillan	20	Hamilton Academical	Loan	Winter	n/a	
17	MF	(Scotland)	Chris Burke	25	Cardiff City (Wales)	Transfer	Winter	Free	
54	MF	(Cyprus)	Georgios Efrem	19	Dundee	Loan	Winter	n/a	
15	MF	(Scotland)	Alan Gow	26	Norwich City (England)	Loan	Winter	n/a	
11	MF	(Scotland)	Charlie Adam	23	Blackpool (England)	Loan	Winter	n/a	
49	DF	(Scotland)	Ross Harvey	19	Brechin City	Loan	n/a	n/a	
55	DF	(Scotland)	Steven Kinniburgh	19	St Johnstone	Loan	n/a	n/a	

Last updated: 31 March 2008
Total income: £12.3m

=== Squad statistics ===
List of squad players, including number of appearances by competition

No.	Pos	Nat	Player	Total		Premier League		FA Cup		League Cup		Other	
No.	Pos	Nat	Player	Apps	Goals	Apps	Goals	Apps	Goals	Apps	Goals	Apps	Goals
1	GK	(Scotland) SCO	Allan McGregor	35	0	27	0	3	0	3	0	2	0
2	MF	(United States) USA	Maurice Edu	16	2	11+1	2	2+1	0	1	0	0	0
3	DF	(Scotland) SCO	David Weir	47	2	36	2	5	0	4	0	2	0
4	MF	(Portugal) POR	Pedro Mendes	42	4	35	3	3	0	4	1	0	0
5	DF	(Bosnia and Herzegovina) BIH	Saša Papac	39	2	29	1	4	1	4	0	2	0
6	MF	(Scotland) SCO	Barry Ferguson	27	2	17+5	2	3	0	2	0	0	0
7	MF	(Algeria) ALG	Brahim Hemdani	0	0	0	0	0	0	0	0	0	0
8	MF	(Scotland) SCO	Kevin Thomson	14	2	11	1	0	0	1	0	2	1
9	FW	(Scotland) SCO	Kris Boyd	46	31	33+2	27	4+1	1	3+1	3	0+2	0
10	FW	(Spain) ESP	Nacho Novo	38	9	7+22	5	0+3	2	2+2	2	1+1	0
11	MF	(Scotland) SCO	Charlie Adam	11	0	7+2	0	0	0	0	0	2	0
12	MF	(Scotland) SCO	Lee McCulloch	20	0	10+2	0	2+2	0	1+1	0	2	0
14	FW	(Scotland) SCO	Steven Naismith	11	0	1+6	0	2+1	0	1	0	0	0
15	MF	(Scotland) SCO	Alan Gow	0	0	0	0	0	0	0	0	0	0
16	GK	(Scotland) SCO	Graeme Smith	0	0	0	0	0	0	0	0	0	0
17	MF	(Scotland) SCO	Chris Burke	2	0	0+2	0	0	0	0	0	0	0
18	FW	(Scotland) SCO	Kenny Miller	38	13	25+5	10	4+1	3	1	0	2	0
19	FW	(France) FRA	Jean-Claude Darcheville	11	1	4+4	1	0	0	2	0	1	0
20	MF	(United States) USA	DaMarcus Beasley	12	0	6+4	0	1	0	0+1	0	0	0
21	DF	(Scotland) SCO	Kirk Broadfoot	34	0	27	0	1	0	4	0	2	0
22	DF	(Scotland) SCO	Andy Webster	0	0	0	0	0	0	0	0	0	0
23	DF	(Scotland) SCO	Christian Dailly	14	0	7+2	0	1+1	0	0+1	0	2	0
24	DF	(Algeria) ALG	Madjid Bougherra	39	1	31	1	5	0	3	0	0	0
25	GK	(Scotland) SCO	Neil Alexander	14	0	11	0	2	0	1	0	0	0
26	DF	(Scotland) SCO	Steven Smith	6	0	5	0	1	0	0	0	0	0
27	FW	(Northern Ireland) NIR	Kyle Lafferty	32	9	11+14	6	2+1	2	2+1	1	0+1	0
28	DF	(Scotland) SCO	Steven Whittaker	31	3	19+5	2	4	1	1	0	2	0
29	FW	(Gabon) GAB	Daniel Cousin	2	1	1+1	1	0	0	0	0	0	0
31	MF	(Spain) ESP	Aarón Ñíguez	5	2	0+3	0	1+1	2	0	0	0	0
35	MF	(Northern Ireland) NIR	Steven Davis	43	7	34	6	4+1	1	4	0	0	0
37	FW	(Lithuania) LTU	Andrius Velička	11	5	6+2	4	1	1	0	0	0+2	0
45	FW	(Scotland) SCO	Rory Loy	1	0	0+1	0	0	0	0	0	0	0
53	MF	(Scotland) SCO	John Fleck	10	1	7+1	1	0+1	0	0+1	0	0	0
56	FW	(Northern Ireland) NIR	Andrew Little	1	0	0	0	0+1	0	0	0	0	0

=== Top Scorer ===
N	P	Nat.	Name	SPL	SC	SLC	E	Total
9	FW	(Scotland)	Kris Boyd	27	1	3		31
18	FW	(Scotland)	Kenny Miller	10	3			13
10	FW	(Spain)	Nacho Novo	5	2	2		9
27	FW	(Northern Ireland)	Kyle Lafferty	6	2	1		9
35	MF	(Northern Ireland)	Steven Davis	5	1	1		7
37	FW	(Lithuania)	Andrius Velička	4		1		5
4	MF	(Portugal)	Pedro Mendes	3		1		4
28	DF	(Scotland)	Steven Whittaker	2	1			3
3	DF	(Scotland)	David Weir	2				2
2	MF	(United States)	Maurice Edu	2				2
6	MF	(Scotland)	Barry Ferguson	2				2
5	DF	(Bosnia and Herzegovina)	Saša Papac	1	1			2
8	MF	(Scotland)	Kevin Thomson	1			1	2
31	MF	(Spain)	Aarón Ñíguez		2			2
24	DF	(Algeria)	Madjid Bougherra	1				1
53	MF	(Scotland)	John Fleck	1				1
19	FW	(France)	Jean-Claude Darcheville	1				1
29	FW	(Gabon)	Daniel Cousin	1				1

Last updated: 24 May 2009
Source: Match reports
Only competitive matches

=== Disciplinary record ===
N	P	Nat.	Name	YC	Yellow card Red card	RC
1	GK	(Scotland)	Allan McGregor	1		
3	DF	(Scotland)	David Weir	5		1
4	MF	(Portugal)	Pedro Mendes	7		
5	DF	(Bosnia and Herzegovina)	Saša Papac	6	1	1
6	MF	(Scotland)	Barry Ferguson	3		
8	MF	(Scotland)	Kevin Thomson	4		
9	FW	(Scotland)	Kris Boyd	6		
10	FW	(Spain)	Nacho Novo	2		
11	MF	(Scotland)	Charlie Adam	2		
12	MF	(Scotland)	Lee McCulloch	6		
14	FW	(Scotland)	Steven Naismith	1		
18	FW	(Scotland)	Kenny Miller	3		
21	DF	(Scotland)	Kirk Broadfoot	4		1
23	DF	(Scotland)	Christian Dailly	4		
24	DF	(Algeria)	Madjid Bougherra	8		1
26	DF	(Scotland)	Steven Smith	2		
27	FW	(Northern Ireland)	Kyle Lafferty	6		
28	DF	(Scotland)	Steven Whittaker	5		
29	FW	(Gabon)	Daniel Cousin	1	1	
31	MF	(Spain)	Aarón Ñíguez	1		
35	MF	(Northern Ireland)	Steven Davis	1		
53	MF	(Scotland)	John Fleck	1		

Last updated: 24 May 2009
Source: Match reports
Only competitive matches

== Club ==
=== Board of directors ===
Position	Staff
Chairman	(Scotland) David Murray
Chief executive	(Scotland) Martin Bain
Finance director	(Scotland) Donald McIntyre
Non-executive director	(Scotland) John Greig
Non-executive director	(Scotland) Alastair Johnston
Non-executive director	(Scotland) John McClelland
Non-executive director	(Scotland) Dave King
Non-executive director	(Scotland) Paul Murray
Non-executive director	(Scotland) Donald Wilson

Source: Wikipedia articles

=== Coaching staff ===
Position	Staff
Manager	(Scotland) Walter Smith
Assistant manager	(Scotland) Ally McCoist
First-team coach	(Scotland) Kenny McDowall
First-team coach	(Scotland) Ian Durrant (from 30 June)
Fitness coach	(Wales) Adam Owen
Goalkeepers coach	(Scotland) Jim Stewart

Source: Wikipedia articles

=== Other staff ===
Position	Staff
Head of Football administration	(Scotland) Andrew Dickson
Physiotherapist	(Scotland) Phillip Yeates
Doctor	(Scotland) Dr Paul Jackson
Chief scout	(Scotland) Ewan Chester
Massuer	(Scotland) David Lavery
Kit controller	(Scotland) Jimmy Bell
Video analyst	(Scotland) Steve Harvey

Source: Wikipedia articles

== Matches ==
=== Pre-season and friendlies ===
Game	Date	Tournament	Round	Ground	Opponent	Score^{1}	Report
1	13 July 2008	Friendly		A	(Germany) Preußen Münster	1–0	Report / Report link; Attendance / 5,211; Referee / Cetin Sevinc (Germany); Preußen Münster / Rangers; / 35' (pen.) Adam
2	16 July 2008	Friendly		A	(Germany) Sportfreunde Lotte	3–1	Report / Report link; Kick off / 18:00 BST; Attendance / 3,000; Referee / (Germany) Rene Kunsleben; Sportfreunde Lotte / Rangers; 5' Dennis Rommel / 70' Boyd; 71' Boyd; 86' Fleck
3	19 July 2008	Friendly		A	(Germany) Schalke 04	0–1	Report / Report link; Attendance / 28,350; Referee / (Germany) Detlef Scheppe; Schalke 04 / Rangers; 30' Krstajić
4	22 July 2008	Friendly		A	Clyde	1–0	Report / Report link; Kick off / 19:45 BST; Attendance / 7,653; Referee / (Scotland) Steven Nicholls; Clyde / Rangers; / 79' Novo
5	26 July 2008	Friendly		A	Raith Rovers	2–1	Report / Report link; Kick off / 15:00 BST; Attendance / 4,865; Referee / (Scotland) Steve Conroy; Raith Rovers / Rangers; 31' Smith / 70' Novo; 79' Cousin
6	2 August 2008	Friendly		H	(England) Liverpool	0–4	Report / Report link; Kick off / 15:00 BST; Attendance / 50,223; Referee / (Scotland) Craig Thomson; Rangers / Liverpool; / 23' Torres; 56' Ngog; 60' Benayoun; 70' (pen.) Alonso
7	4 February 2009	Friendly		H	(Italy) AC Milan	2–2	Report / Report link; Kick off / 19:45 GMT; Attendance / 45,197; Referee / (Scotland) William Collum; Rangers / Milan; 64' Beasley; 82' Papac / 69' Pato; 77' Kaká

Last updated: 24 May 2009
^{1}Rangers goals come first.
National flags for Ground and Opponent columns are only shown when different from that of Rangers.
M = Match; Ground: H = Home, A = Away, N = Neutral, HR = Home replacement, AR = Away replacement.

=== Scottish Premier League ===
Game	Date	Tournament	Round	Ground	Opponent	Score^{1}	Report
3	9 August 2008	Scottish Premier League	1	A	Falkirk	1–0	Report / Report link; Kick off / 12:30 BST; Attendance / 6,669; Referee / Dougie McDonald (Scotland); Falkirk / Rangers; / 64' Velička
4	16 August 2008	Scottish Premier League	2	H	Heart of Midlothian	2–0	Report / Report link; Kick off / 15:00 BST; Attendance / 48,191; Referee / Stuart Dougal (Scotland); Rangers / Heart of Midlothian; 37' Lafferty; 90' (pen.) Boyd / (yellow card) 74' (red card) Mikoliunas
5	23 August 2009	Scottish Premier League	3	A	Aberdeen	1–1	Report / Report link; Kick off / 12:30 BST; Attendance / 16,489; Referee / Craig Thomson (Scotland); Aberdeen / Rangers; 45' Young / 24' Weir
6	31 August 2008	Scottish Premier League	4	A	Celtic	4–2	Report / Report link; Kick off / 12:30 BST; Attendance / 58,595; Referee / Dougie McDonald (Scotland); Celtic / Rangers; 39' Samaras; (red card) 76' Vennegoor of Hesselink; 90' Nakamura / 37' Cousin; 52' Miller; 62' Mendes; (yellow card) 75' (red card) Cousin; 79' Miller
7	13 September 2008	Scottish Premier League	5	H	Kilmarnock	2–1	Report / Report link; Kick off / 15:00 BST; Attendance / 50,019; Referee / Calum Murray (Scotland); Rangers / Kilmarnock; 58' Boyd; 62' Boyd; (yellow card) 90' (red card) Papac / 9' Wright
8	21 September 2008	Scottish Premier League	6	H	Motherwell	2–1	Report / Report link; Kick off / 15:00 BST; Attendance / 49,448; Referee / Eddie Smith (Scotland); Rangers / Motherwell; 57' Davis; 76' Novo / 87' Clarkson
10	28 September 2008	Scottish Premier League	7	A	Hibernian	3–0	Report / Report link; Kick off / 14:00 BST; Attendance / 15,292; Referee / Calum Murray (Scotland); Hibernian / Rangers; / 31' Miller; 40' Miller; 73' Bougherra
11	5 October 2008	Scottish Premier League	8	A	St Mirren	0–1	Report / Report link; Kick off / 14:00 GMT; Attendance / 7,520; Referee / William Collum (Scotland); St Mirren / Rangers; 77' McGinn
12	25 October 2008	Scottish Premier League	10	A	Hamilton Academical	3–1	Report / Report link; Kick off / 12:30 GMT; Attendance / 4,613; Referee / Dougie McDonald (Scotland); Hamilton Academical / Rangers; 26' Easton / 42' (pen.) Boyd; 50' Boyd; 80' Novo
14	1 November 2008	Scottish Premier League	11	H	Inverness Caledonian Thistle	5–0	Report / Report link; Kick off / 15:00 GMT; Attendance / 49,255; Referee / Crawford Allan (Scotland); Rangers / Inverness Caledonian Thistle; 7' Novo; 14' Boyd; 19' Boyd; 28' (pen.) Boyd; 45' Miller
15	4 November 2008	Scottish Premier League	9	H	Dundee United	3–3	Report / Report link; Kick off / 19:45 GMT; Attendance / 48,686; Referee / Craig Thomson (Scotland); Rangers / Dundee United; 11' Davis; 37' Papac; 90' Thomson / 17' Sandaza; 58' Sandaza; 59' Robertson
16	9 November 2008	Scottish Premier League	12	A	Kilmarnock	4–0	Report / Report link; Kick off / 14:00 GMT; Attendance / 10,153; Referee / Eddie Smith (Scotland); Kilmarnock / Rangers; / 50' Weir; 54' Boyd; 87' Miller; 90' Whittaker
17	12 November 2008	Scottish Premier League	13	A	Motherwell	0–0	Report / Report link; Kick off / 19:45 GMT; Attendance / 9,600; Referee / Steve Conroy (Scotland)
18	15 November 2008	Scottish Premier League	14	H	St Mirren	2–1	Report / Report link; Kick off / 15:00 GMT; Attendance / 49,321; Referee / David Somers (Scotland); Rangers / St Mirren; 5' Boyd; 10' Davis / 81' Miranda
19	22 November 2008	Scottish Premier League	15	H	Aberdeen	2–0	Report / Report link; Kick off / 15:00 GMT; Attendance / 50,166; Referee / Craig Thomson (Scotland); Rangers / Aberdeen; 52' Darcheville; 68' Boyd
20	29 November 2008	Scottish Premier League	16	A	Heart of Midlothian	1–2	Report / Report link; Kick off / 12:30 GMT; Attendance / 15,710; Referee / Dougie McDonald (Scotland); Heart of Midlothian / Rangers; 20' Zaliukas; 23' Kingston; (yellow card) 76' (red card) Wallace / 26' (o.g.) Karipidis
21	6 December 2008	Scottish Premier League	17	H	Hamilton Academical	7–1	Report / Report link; Kick off / 15:00 GMT; Attendance / 48,282; Referee / Calum Murray (Scotland); Rangers / Hamilton Academical; 11' Miller; 28' (pen.) Boyd; 52' Boyd; 62' Boyd; 80' Lafferty; 88' Novo; 90' Davis / 2' McArthur; (red card) 51' Canning
22	13 December 2008	Scottish Premier League	18	A	Dundee United	2–2	Report / Report link; Kick off / 12:30 GMT; Attendance / 11,362; Referee / Iain Brines (Scotland); Dundee United / Rangers; 50' Wilkie; 54' Feeney / 11' Boyd; 76' Lafferty
23	20 December 2008	Scottish Premier League	19	H	Hibernian	1–0	Report / Report link; Kick off / 15:00 GMT; Attendance / 49,538; Referee / Steve Conroy (Scotland); Rangers / Hibernian; 11' Boyd
24	27 December 2008	Scottish Premier League	20	H	Celtic	0–1	Report / Report link; Kick off / 12:30 GMT; Attendance / 50,403; Referee / Craig Thomson (Scotland); Rangers / Celtic; / 58' McDonald
25	4 January 2009	Scottish Premier League	21	A	Inverness Caledonian Thistle	3–0	Report / Report link; Kick off / 12:30 GMT; Attendance / 7,056; Referee / Dougie McDonald (Scotland); Inverness Caledonian Thistle / Rangers; / 46' Mendes; 81' Boyd; 87' Boyd
27	17 January 2009	Scottish Premier League	22	H	Falkirk	3–1	Report / Report link; Kick off / 15:00 GMT; Attendance / 48,811; Referee / William Collum (Scotland); Rangers / Falkirk; 45' (pen.) Boyd; (red card) 77' Papac; 80' Boyd; 90' Davis / 12' Lovell; (red card) 51' Cregg
28	24 January 2009	Scottish Premier League	23	A	Aberdeen	0–0	Report / Report link; Kick off / 12:30 GMT; Attendance / 20,441; Referee / Calum Murray (Scotland)
30	31 January 2009	Scottish Premier League	24	H	Dundee United	2–0	Report / Report link; Kick off / 15:00 GMT; Attendance / 49,911; Referee / Iain Brines (Scotland); Rangers / Dundee United; 78' (pen.) Fleck; 90' Lafferty
31	15 February 2009	Scottish Premier League	25	A	Celtic	0–0	Report / Report link; Kick off / 12:30 GMT; Attendance / 58,766; Referee / Calum Murray (Scotland)
33	21 February 2009	Scottish Premier League	26	H	Kilmarnock	3–1	Report / Report link; Kick off / 15:00 GMT; Attendance / 50,301; Referee / Brian Winter (Scotland); Rangers / Kilmarnock; 29' Miller; 33' Boyd; 35' Boyd / 17' Hamill
34	28 February 2009	Scottish Premier League	27	A	Hamilton Academical	1–0	Report / Report link; Kick off / 12:30 GMT; Attendance / 5,895; Referee / Craig Thomson (Scotland); Hamilton Academical / Rangers; / 35' Ferguson
35	4 March 2009	Scottish Premier League	28	H	Inverness Caledonian Thistle	0–1	Report / Report link; Kick off / 19:45 GMT; Attendance / 48,129; Referee / Calum Murray (Scotland); Rangers / Inverness Caledonian Thistle; (red card) 90' Weir / 90' Black
38	21 March 2009	Scottish Premier League	29	H	Heart of Midlothian	2–2	Report / Report link; Kick off / 15:00 GMT; Attendance / 50,310; Referee / Craig Thomson (Scotland); Rangers / Heart of Midlothian; 9' Lafferty; 45' Ferguson / 64' Karipidis; 67' Palazuelos
39	5 April 2009	Scottish Premier League	30	A	Falkirk	1–0	Report / Report link; Kick off / 14:00 BST; Attendance / 6,853; Referee / Iain Brines (Scotland); Falkirk / Rangers; / 9' Boyd
40	8 April 2009	Scottish Premier League	31	A	St Mirren	2–1	Report / Report link; Kick off / 19:45 BST; Attendance / 6,231; Referee / Eddie Smith (Scotland); St Mirren / Rangers; 56' Dorman / 12' Boyd; 19' Edu
41	11 April 2009	Scottish Premier League	32	H	Motherwell	3–1	Report / Report link; Kick off / 15:00 BST; Attendance / 50,080; Referee / David Somers (Scotland); Rangers / Motherwell; 2' Velička; 10' Boyd; 65' (pen.) Boyd / 37' Sutton
42	19 April 2009	Scottish Premier League	33	A	Hibernian	3–2	Report / Report link; Kick off / 14:00 BST; Attendance / 14,014; Referee / Steve Conroy (Scotland); Hibernian / Rangers; 34' Sutton; 84' Rankin / 2' Whittaker; 52' Velička; 73' Edu
44	3 May 2009	Scottish Premier League	34	H	Heart of Midlothian	2–0	Report / Report link; Kick off / 15:30 BST; Attendance / 49,663; Referee / Iain Brines (Scotland); Rangers / Heart of Midlothian; 45' Velička; 89' Boyd
45	9 May 2009	Scottish Premier League	35	H	Celtic	1–0	Report / Report link; Kick off / 12:30 BST; Attendance / 50,321; Referee / Craig Thomson (Scotland); Rangers / Celtic; 37' Davis
46	13 May 2009	Scottish Premier League	36	A	Hibernian	1–1	Report / Report link; Kick off / 19:45 BST; Attendance / 13,765; Referee / Eddie Smith (Scotland); Hibernian / Rangers; 41' Riordan / 80' Novo
47	16 May 2009	Scottish Premier League	37	H	Aberdeen	2–1	Report / Report link; Kick off / 12:30 BST; Attendance / 50,295; Referee / Stuart Dougal (Scotland); Rangers / Aberdeen; (red card) 40' Bougherra; 41' (o.g.) Foster; 68' Miller / (red card) 18' Mulgrew; 77' Paton
48	24 May 2009	Scottish Premier League	38	A	Dundee United	3–0	Report / Report link; Kick off / 13:00 BST; Attendance / 14,077; Referee / Dougie McDonald (Scotland); Dundee United / Rangers; / 6' Lafferty; 45' Mendes; 52' Boyd

Last updated: 24 May 2009
Source: Wikipedia article
^{1}Rangers goals come first.
National flags for Ground and Opponent columns are only shown when different from that of Rangers.
M = Match; Ground: H = Home, A = Away, N = Neutral, HR = Home replacement, AR = Away replacement.

=== Scottish League Cup ===
Game	Date	Tournament	Round	Ground	Opponent	Score^{1}	Report
9	24 September 2008	League Cup	3	A	Partick Thistle	2–1	Report / Report link; Kick off / 19:45 BST; Attendance / 6,497; Referee / Steve Conroy (Scotland); Partick Thistle / Rangers; 33' McKeown / 25' Boyd; 116' Mendes
13	28 October 2008	League Cup	QF	H	Hamilton Academical	2–0	Report / Report link; Kick off / 19:45 GMT; Attendance / 32,083; Referee / Eddie Smith (Scotland); Rangers / Hamilton Academical; 25' Boyd; 50' Lafferty
29	27 January 2009	League Cup	SF	N	Falkirk	3–0	Report / Report link; Kick off / 19:45 GMT; Attendance / 24,507; Referee / Charlie Richmond (Scotland); Rangers / Falkirk; 8' Novo; 40' Novo; 88' Boyd
37	15 March 2009	League Cup	F	N	Celtic	0–2	Report / Report link; Kick off / 15:00 GMT; Attendance / 51,193; Referee / Dougie McDonald (Scotland); Celtic / Rangers; 91' O'Dea; 120' (pen.) McGeady / (yellow card) 120' (red card) Broadfoot

Last updated: 15 March 2009
Source: Wikipedia article
^{1}Rangers goals come first.
National flags for Ground and Opponent columns are only shown when different from that of Rangers.
M = Match; Ground: H = Home, A = Away, N = Neutral, HR = Home replacement, AR = Away replacement.

=== Scottish Cup ===
Game	Date	Tournament	Round	Ground	Opponent	Score^{1}	Report
26	13 January 2009	Scottish Cup	4	A	St Johnstone	2–0	Report / Report link; Kick off / 20:05 BST; Attendance / 7,746; Referee / Dougie McDonald (Scotland); St Johnstone / Rangers; / 43' (o.g.) McCaffrey; 79' Novo
32	18 February 2009	Scottish Cup	5	A	Forfar Athletic	4–0	Report / Report link; Kick off / 19:45 GMT; Attendance / 4,718; Referee / Eddie Smith (Scotland); Forfar Athletic / Rangers; (red card) 70' Elliot Smith / 8' Papac; 54' Miller; 84' Aarón; 90' Miller
36	8 March 2009	Scottish Cup	QF	H	Hamilton Academical	5–1	Report / Report link; Kick off / 15:00 GMT; Attendance / 27,588; Referee / Iain Brines (Scotland); Rangers / Hamilton Academical; 15' Whittaker; 35' Lafferty; 45' (pen.) Aarón; 53' Davis; 81' Lafferty / 26' Quinn
43	25 April 2009	Scottish Cup	SF	N	St Mirren	3–0	Report / Report link; Kick off / 12:15 BST; Attendance / 32,431; Referee / Calum Murray (Scotland); Rangers / St Mirren; 2' Velička; 66' Boyd; 70' Miller
49	30 May 2009	Scottish Cup	F	N	Falkirk	1–0	Report / Report link; Kick off / 15:00 BST; Attendance / 51,193; Referee / Craig Thomson (Scotland); Rangers / Falkirk; 46' Novo

Last updated: 30 May 2009
Source: Wikipedia article
^{1}Rangers goals come first.
National flags for Ground and Opponent columns are only shown when different from that of Rangers.
M = Match; Ground: H = Home, A = Away, N = Neutral, HR = Home replacement, AR = Away replacement.

=== UEFA Champions League ===
Game

Date

Tournament

Round

Ground

Opponent

Score^{1}

Report

1
30 July 2008
Champions League
QR2
H
(Lithuania) FBK Kaunas
0–0

Report	Report link
Kick off	19:45 BST
Attendance	34,847
Referee	(Netherlands) Kevin Blom

2
5 August 2008
Champions League
QR2
A
(Lithuania) FBK Kaunas
1–2

Report	Report link
Kick off	18:05 BST
Attendance	5,500
Referee	(Sweden) Stefan Johannesson
FBK Kaunas	Rangers
43' Radžius; 87' Pilibaitis	33' Thomson

Last updated: 5 August 2008
Source: Wikipedia article
^{1}Rangers goals come first.
National flags for Ground and Opponent columns are only shown when different from that of Rangers.
M = Match; Ground: H = Home, A = Away, N = Neutral, HR = Home replacement, AR = Away replacement.

== Competitions ==
=== Overall ===
Competition	Started round	Final position / round	First match	Last match
Scottish Premier League	—	1st	9 August	24 May
Champions League	Second Qualifying Round	Second Qualifying Round	30 July	6 August
League Cup	3rd round	Runners-up	24 September	15 March
Scottish Cup	4th Round	Winners	13 January	30 May

Source: Competitions

=== Scottish Premier League ===
==== Standings ====
Pos	Team	Pld	W	D	L	GF	GA	GD	Pts	Qualification or relegation (Note: Teams played each other three times (33 matches), before the league split into two groups (the top six and the bottom six) for the last five matches.)
1	Rangers (C)	38	26	8	4	77	28	+49	86	Qualification for the Champions League group stage
2	Celtic	38	24	10	4	80	33	+47	82	Qualification for the Champions League third qualifying round
3	Heart of Midlothian	38	16	11	11	40	37	+3	59	Qualification for the Europa League play-off round
4	Aberdeen	38	14	11	13	41	40	+1	53	Qualification for the Europa League third qualifying round
5	Dundee United	38	13	14	11	47	50	−3	53	

Source: Scottish Professional Football League
Rules for classification: 1) Points; 2) Goal difference; 3) Goals scored
(C) Champions

==== Results summary ====
Overall								Home						Away					
Pld	W	D	L	GF	GA	GD	Pts	W	D	L	GF	GA	GD	W	D	L	GF	GA	GD
38	26	8	4	77	28	+49	86	15	2	2	44	15	+29	11	6	2	33	13	+20

Last updated: 24 May 2009.
Source: Wikipedia article

==== Results by round ====
Round	1	2	3	4	5	6	7	8	9	10	11	12	13	14	15	16	17	18	19	20	21	22	23	24	25	26	27	28	29	30	31	32	33	34	35	36	37	38
Ground	A	H	A	A	H	H	A	A	H	A	H	A	A	H	H	A	H	A	H	H	A	H	A	H	A	H	A	H	A	H	A	H	A	H	H	A	H	A
Result	W	W	D	W	W	W	W	L	D	W	W	W	D	W	W	L	W	D	W	L	W	W	D	W	D	W	W	L	W	D	W	W	W	W	W	D	W	W

Updated to match(es) played on 24 May 2009. Source: 2008–09 Scottish Premier League
A = Away; H = Home; W = Win; D = Draw; L = Loss
