= John Fleck (footballer) =

Scottish footballer (born 1991)

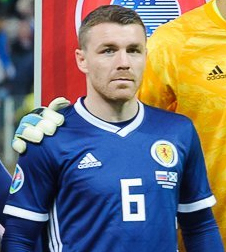
- Fleck lining up for Scotland in 2019

Personal information
- Full name: John Alexander Fleck
- Date of birth: 24 August 1991 (age 35)
- Place of birth: Glasgow, Scotland
- Height: 5 ft 7 in (1.70 m)
- Position: Midfielder

Team information
- Current team: Chesterfield
- Number: 13

Youth career
- 2005–2007: Rangers

Senior career*
Years	Team	Apps	(Gls)
2007–2012	Rangers	41	(2)
2012	→ Blackpool (loan)	7	(0)
2012–2016	Coventry City	162	(8)
2016–2024	Sheffield United	256	(15)
2024	Blackburn Rovers	1	(0)
2024–2026	Chesterfield	33	(1)

International career
2007–2008	Scotland U17	9	(3)
2008–2010	Scotland U19	4	(0)
2009–2012	Scotland U21	4	(0)
2019–2021	Scotland	5	(0)
- * Club domestic league appearances and goals as of 9 July 2026 (UTC)

John Alexander Fleck (born 24 August 1991) is a Scottish professional footballer who most recently played as a midfielder for EFL League Two club Chesterfield.

He began his career with Rangers, making his senior debut in 2008 aged 16, and later spending a period on loan to Blackpool. In 2012 he transferred to Coventry City, remaining there until 2016 when he joined Sheffield United, helping the club achieve two promotions in three years, moving up from League One to the Premier League. In February 2024, Fleck joined Blackburn Rovers before signing for Chesterfield later that year.

== Early life ==
Fleck was born in Glasgow and was brought up in the city's Yoker (Langy) district; he was educated at Knightswood Secondary School. His uncle, former Scotland international Robert Fleck, played for Rangers, Chelsea and Norwich in the 1980s and 1990s.

== Club career ==
=== Rangers ===
Fleck began his career in the Rangers youth teams; he played in their 5–0 Scottish Youth Cup victory over Celtic on 26 April 2007. On 12 July 2007, Fleck was called up to take part in the full squad pre-season tour of Germany, and made his debut for the first team against SV Lippstadt 08 on 15 July 2007, becoming the first 15-year-old to play for the first team since Derek Ferguson in 1982.

On 25 August 2007, just a day after his 16th birthday, Fleck was included for the first time in the Rangers first team squad for a competitive match against Kilmarnock. He made his competitive debut on 23 January 2008 in the Scottish Cup game against East Stirlingshire and made his league debut on 22 May in the final league game of the season against Aberdeen. Two days later, Fleck became the youngest ever player to play in a senior British cup final, by appearing as a substitute in the 2008 Scottish Cup Final against Queen of the South. He gained his first start for Rangers against Falkirk on 17 January 2009, earning the man of the match award for his performance. Five days before this, The Times had placed Fleck seventh in their Top 50 Rising Stars of football list.

Fleck scored his first competitive goal in a 2–0 league victory over Dundee United at Ibrox on 31 January 2009. The goal was a 78th-minute penalty, awarded after Mihael Kovačević's challenge had brought Fleck to the ground. Fleck's talent, precocious performances, technique, vision and work-rate led him to be heralded by some in the media as "Scotland's Wayne Rooney".

It was reported in August 2009 that Fleck had been dropped from the Rangers first-team after a training ground "bust-up" with the assistant manager, Ally McCoist. On 26 March 2010, Fleck signed a new three-year contract. That summer, he had a strong pre-season but then suffered a hamstring injury early in the campaign which hampered his progress.

With first team chances in short supply at Rangers, Fleck agreed to move to Sheffield United on a season-long loan at the end of the 2011 summer transfer window but the deal subsequently fell through as the paperwork was not completed before the deadline. In January 2012, having appeared to have seized a fresh chance in the team at Rangers a few weeks earlier, Fleck signed for Championship club Blackpool on loan, despite renewed interest from Sheffield United.

In June 2012, Fleck lodged an objection against his contract being transferred to the newco set up by Charles Green. PFA Scotland had previously commented that players were entitled to become free agents if they objected to the transfer.

=== Coventry City ===
On 4 July 2012, Fleck joined League One club Coventry City after he rejected his Rangers contract being transferred to the new company. Rangers were reported to have a sell-on agreement, meaning they would be entitled to a percentage of any transfer fee Coventry subsequently received for the player. Fleck scored his first Coventry goal in a 4–1 loss away to Shrewsbury Town from the penalty spot on 18 September 2012. He struggled to gain a regular starting spot in the team during his first season at the club, particularly during the reign of Mark Robins, although he went on to make 35 appearances and scored three times.

The arrival of Steven Pressley as Coventry City manager in March 2013 saw Fleck regain a starting spot in the Coventry City line-up, starting every game of the remaining 2012–13 season in a deep-lying central midfield role. Fleck remained first-choice for the following season which Coventry City played at Northampton Town's Sixfields Stadium and played a key role in the team as they overcame a 10-point deduction to mount an unlikely play-off push for the first half of the season.

Fleck struggled for form in the remaining months of the 2013–14 season but started the following campaign well, putting in a strong performance as the team beat Gillingham 1–0 to mark the club's return to Coventry in September 2014. Fleck signed an 18-month contract extension in January 2015 to keep him at the club until the summer of 2016.

Fleck saw another upturn in form at Coventry City in the 2015–16 season where under the management of Tony Mowbray he was encouraged to play a more forward-thinking role in the team, aided by the defensive support of midfield partner Romain Vincelot. Fleck's importance to the team was described by Mowbray as being 'the oil in our machine' as the Sky Blues rose to the top of the League One table. Fleck was rewarded for his improvement in 2015–16 by being awarded the club's player of the year award by both the fans and his teammates at the club's end of season awards.

=== Sheffield United ===
Fleck signed a three-year contract with Sheffield United in July 2016. He scored his first goal for the club in a 4–1 win over Chesterfield on 13 November 2016. On 8 April 2017, Fleck scored a late winner against Northampton Town at Sixfields Stadium – the fans reacted by running onto the pitch to celebrate promotion. On 15 April 2017, United were crowned League One champions and promoted to the Championship. On 22 September 2017, Fleck signed a new four-year contract with the club to keep him at Bramall Lane until summer 2022.

Fleck has won the Player of the Year award twice whilst at Sheffield United, once in the 2016–17 season (tied with teammate Billy Sharp) and again the next year.

On 28 April 2019, Fleck saw his second promotion in three seasons with United, this time to the Premier League, the club returning after a 12-year absence.

On 22 February 2020, Fleck signed a new three-year deal. He was a key player for the Blades in their return to the top flight, playing 30 games, as he helped his side to a surprising ninth-place finish. He scored 5 goals in his maiden Premier League campaign, netting against the likes of Manchester United and Arsenal and scoring both goals in a 2–0 home win over Aston Villa.

=== Blackburn Rovers ===
After just 4 league appearances for Sheffield United in the first half of the 2023-24 season, with his only start being in a damaging 5–0 defeat to fellow promoted side Burnley, Fleck joined EFL Championship side Blackburn Rovers on 1 February 2024 on a deal until the end of the season. Fleck made his Blackburn debut in a 2–2 draw against Preston North End on 17 February, a game in which he had to come off injured after 17 minutes. The shin injury sustained in this match subsequently kept him out for the rest of the season.

He was not named on Blackburn's retained list for the upcoming season, although the club made note that they are in ongoing discussions with his representatives.

=== Chesterfield ===
On 10 September 2024, Fleck joined League Two club Chesterfield on a contract until the end of the season.

On 19 June 2025, the club announced he had signed a new contract. On 22 May 2026, the club announced the player was being released.

== International career ==
After playing for Scotland at under-21 level, Fleck was called up to the Scottish senior team for the first time in November 2018. He did not play in that match, and had to decline an invitation to join the squad in May 2019 as it clashed with his wedding in Ayrshire, arranged two years earlier when he seemed far less likely to be involved with the national team.

On 10 October 2019, Fleck gained his first senior Scotland cap in a 4–0 defeat to Russia in Moscow.

In May 2021, Fleck was named in the 26-man Scotland squad for the 2020 European Championships. While on pre-tournament training camp, Fleck tested positive for COVID-19.

== Career statistics ==
=== Club ===
Appearances and goals by club, season and competition
Club	Season	League			National Cup (Note: Includes Scottish Cup, FA Cup)		League Cup (Note: Includes Scottish League Cup, Football League Cup/EFL Cup)		Other		Total	
Club	Season	Division	Apps	Goals	Apps	Goals	Apps	Goals	Apps	Goals	Apps	Goals
Rangers	2007–08	Scottish Premier League	1	0	2	0	0	0	0	0	3	0
Rangers	2008–09	Scottish Premier League	8	1	1	0	1	0	0	0	10	1
Rangers	2009–10	Scottish Premier League	15	1	3	0	2	1	3 (Note: Appearance(s) in UEFA Champions League)	0	23	2
Rangers	2010–11	Scottish Premier League	13	0	1	0	1	0	2 (Note: One appearance in UEFA Champions League, one in UEFA Europa League)	0	17	0
Rangers	2011–12	Scottish Premier League	4	0	1	0	0	0	0	0	5	0
Rangers	Total		41	2	8	0	4	1	5	0	58	3
Blackpool (loan)	2011–12	Championship	7	0	1	0	—		—		8	0
Coventry City	2012–13	League One	35	3	2	0	1	0	4 (Note: Appearance(s) in Football League Trophy)	0	42	3
Coventry City	2013–14	League One	43	1	4	0	1	0	1	0	49	1
Coventry City	2014–15	League One	44	0	0	0	1	0	3	0	48	0
Coventry City	2015–16	League One	40	4	1	0	1	0	1	0	43	4
Coventry City	Total		162	8	7	0	4	0	9	0	182	8
Sheffield United	2016–17	League One	44	4	2	0	1	0	2 (Note: Appearances in EFL Trophy)	0	49	4
Sheffield United	2017–18	Championship	41	2	2	0	1	0	—		44	2
Sheffield United	2018–19	Championship	45	2	0	0	1	0	—		46	2
Sheffield United	2019–20	Premier League	30	5	1	0	1	0	—		32	5
Sheffield United	2020–21	Premier League	31	0	4	0	0	0	—		35	0
Sheffield United	2021–22	Championship	35	1	0	0	2	0	2 (Note: Appearance(s) in Championship play-offs)	1	39	2
Sheffield United	2022–23	Championship	26	1	2	0	1	0	—		29	1
Sheffield United	2023–24	Premier League	4	0	0	0	0	0	—		4	0
Sheffield United	Total		256	15	11	0	7	0	4	1	278	16
Blackburn Rovers	2023–24	Championship	1	0	0	0	0	0	—		1	0
Chesterfield	2024–25	League Two	16	0	1	0	0	0	3	0	20	0
Career total			483	25	28	0	15	1	21	1	527	27

=== International ===
As of match played 31 March 2021

Appearances and goals by national team and year
National team	Year	Apps	Goals
Scotland	2019	2	0
Scotland	2020	2	0
Scotland	2021	1	0
Total		5	0

== Honours ==
Rangers

- Scottish Premier League: 2008–09, 2009–10, 2010–11
- Scottish Cup: 2007–08

Sheffield United

- EFL League One: 2016–17
- EFL Championship second-place promotion: 2018–19, 2022—23

Individual

- Coventry City Player of the Year: 2015–16
- PFA Team of the Year: 2016–17 League One
- Sheffield United Player of the Year: 2016–17, 2017–18
