= Calum Murray =

Scottish football referee

- Full name: Calum Murray
- Born: 7 July 1967 (age 58); Scotland

Domestic
Years	League	Role
1991-2015	Scottish Football Association	Referee
1997-2013	SFL	Referee
2000-2013	Scottish Premier League	Referee
2013-2015	SPFL	Referee

Calum Murray (born 7 July 1967) is a Scottish former football referee.

Murray started as a referee in 1991 and was admitted to the senior list six years later. He became a FIFA grade referee in 2005; as of 2013, however, he was no longer included on the FIFA list, having reached the international retirement age of 45. During his career Murray had been in charge of Edinburgh and Old Firm derbies, and has had over thirty international appointments. He served as a referee in 2010 World Cup qualifiers. He retired at the end of the 2014/2015 season, his final match being the Premiership Play-Off semi-final 1st leg between Rangers and Hibernian on 20 May.

He stated that an Old Firm match in 2011 which featured several violent scenes was the toughest match he officiated. Since retiring he has worked as a referee mentor.
