= Alastair Johnston =

British businessman

Alastair James Johnston
- Born: July 1948 (age 77); Glasgow, Scotland
- Occupation: Accountant

Alastair James Johnston (born July 1948) is a former chairman of Rangers. He is a native Glaswegian who divides his time between Glasgow and the United States, where he has business interests. Johnston is best known for his time as chairman of Scottish side Rangers, where he is now a non-executive director.

== Business career ==
A graduate of the University of Strathclyde, Johnston obtained an accountancy degree. In 2004, he was awarded Alumnus of the Year.

He holds the posts of vice-chairman and member of the board of directors of International Management Group (IMG), the international sports and entertainment group. His first client was Grand Slam champion pro golfer Gary Player.

== Football ==
Glasgow-born Johnston is a lifelong Rangers fan who made his name working for Mark McCormack, founder of IMG, and became a Rangers director in 2004. He succeeded David Murray as Rangers chairman on 26 August 2009; however, Johnston was removed by new owner of Rangers Craig Whyte on 24 May 2011. In June 2017, over six years after leaving, Johnston returned to the club as a director of the PLC board. On 30 May 2025, Johnson stood down from the board for a second time following the takeover of Rangers by a US consortium.
