= David Murray (Scottish businessman) =

Scottish entrepreneur, businessman and former chairman of Rangers Football Club

Sir David Murray
- Born: David Edward Murray; 14 October 1951 (age 75); Ayr, Scotland
- Occupations: Entrepreneur; businessman

Sir David Edward Murray (born 14 October 1951) is a Scottish entrepreneur, businessman and former chairman of the Rangers Football Club.

Born in Ayr, Scotland, Murray had formed the company Murray International Metals Limited by the age of 23. The company grew to include steel distribution, mining and property development.

Murray is perhaps best known for his ownership of Scottish football club Rangers, which he purchased for £6 million in 1988. Under his stewardship, the club won 15 League Championships and 20 domestic Cups. Murray stepped down as chairman in 2009, and was replaced by Alastair Johnston.

== Early life and education ==
Born in Ayr on 14 October 1951, Murray was educated at Ayr Academy, Belmont High School, Fettes College and Broughton High School. By the age of 23 Murray had formed Murray International Metals Limited, which was to become a leading distributor of structural steel.

== Business career ==
Subsequently, the Murray Group of companies grew with some saying it became one of the United Kingdom's most successful privately owned enterprises. Added to the core business of steel were interests in surface mining (GM Mining), commercial property development (Premier Property Group), venture capital (Charlotte Ventures) and call centres (RHL, trading as 'RESPONSE' from February 2007 onwards, formerly Response Handling Limited). In 2006, the Murray group collectively reported turnover of £550 million, representing a fivefold increase on the figure five years previously, largely as a result of growing involvement in property development. The global recession of 2007–2008 impacted on the companies' growth and in September 2009 the group registered a loss of some £226 million following a write-down in the value of much of its property portfolio. Over the following years the group's losses continued as it struggled to bring down its debt with asset sales and debt-for-equity swaps by its bankers (the part publicly owned Lloyds Bank through its HBOS subsidiary).

Murray is currently the chairman of Murray Capital, a private investment company which is wholly owned by the Murray family. The company was established in 2000 and invests primarily in traditional economy businesses with a preference for industrial sectors including manufacturing, engineering and oil & gas. Murray Estates, a subsidiary of Murray Capital, is a property development and investment company focusing on identifying and delivering value to prime strategic residential and commercial land.

Alongside his high-profile business activities, other Murray interests have helped cement his prominence in Scottish life.

== Football business ==
=== Acquiring Rangers ===
Murray's involvement in football has overshadowed his business and personal lives and explains much of his prominence within Scottish society. In the 1980s Murray made a bid for Ayr United which was rejected by shareholders of the club. This setback saw Murray focus attention on acquiring Rangers, a club which, following the appointment of Graeme Souness as manager in 1986, had regained its ascendancy in Scottish football.

Attracted by the idea of owning one of Scotland's highest-profile football clubs, on 23 November 1988 Murray secured the purchase of Rangers from the club's then owner, the Nevada-based Lawrence Marlborough, for a sum of £6,000,000.

=== Chairmanship ===
Throughout what was later to transpire as his first period of chairmanship, Murray continued and extended the ambitious strategy he had inherited from David Holmes. His investment saw further development to Ibrox Stadium, which had already undergone extensive remodelling in the aftermath of the Ibrox disaster of 2 January 1971, which claimed the lives of 66 fans following an Old Firm derby with Celtic.

Murray oversaw the construction of a third tier on the existing Main Stand, raising the ground's capacity by 7,300. Accompanying this were changes on the pitch. In 1989 Rangers secured their first trophy under Murray's chairmanship and the first of what was to become nine successive League Championships between the period 1989–1997. This period was to be significant for more reasons than footballing success.

In 1989 Murray and the then manager Graeme Souness signed Mo Johnston, the first high-profile Catholic to play for the club since the Second World War, from French club Nantes for £1.5 million. Since Johnston had previously played for Celtic and had recently committed to re-join them, the transfer to Rangers instead was highly controversial. Other high-profile players were to follow in later years, including Paul Gascoigne, Brian Laudrup, Ronald de Boer and Tore André Flo.

=== Period of success ===
Following Graeme Souness' departure to Liverpool in April 1991, Murray appointed his former assistant Walter Smith as manager. Under Smith, and his eventual replacement in 1998 by Dick Advocaat, Rangers embarked upon a sustained period of success that saw the club win eleven league championships over fourteen years. This domestic domination was not accompanied by success in European competition. Aside from the 1992–93 UEFA Champions League campaign, in which Rangers twice came within one victory of reaching the final, the club's record in Europe from 1989 was one of under-performance upon the expectation.

In 2005–06 Rangers secured qualification from the group stage of the Champions League, becoming the first Scottish side to reach the last-sixteen knockout stage of the competition in its current format. In 2007–08, Rangers reached the final of the UEFA Cup but lost 2–0 to FC Zenit at the City of Manchester Stadium. Rangers went on, however, to win a Cup Double, of the Scottish League Cup, and the Scottish Cup.

In 2001–02, Murray abandoned his previous insistence that Rangers would never leave Scottish football, arguing in support of a move by the Old Firm to the better-resourced English leagues, and ultimately the Premier League. This, Murray and others argued, would provide substantially increased income from growing television revenues, and with it the potential for the club to operate in a more competitive environment which could help boost performance in European competitions.

Due to allegations of Rangers running an undeclared payment system outside of player contracts and therefore improperly registering players with the football authorities, the possibility arose of titles won by Rangers during Murray's reign being revoked. Murray strongly denied claims of any wrongdoing during his stewardship. In 2013 a Scottish Premier League independent commission took place into alleged "undisclosed payments" by Rangers. It found that Rangers had deliberately failed to disclose the trust payments in order to withhold information from HM Revenue & Customs (HMRC) and fined the old company £250,000. It had been anticipated that the investigation would revoke honours won by Rangers during the period that the trust payments were made (five League titles, four Scottish Cups and five League Cups), but this was not done because it was considered that Rangers had not obtained any sporting advantage by withholding information.

=== Finances ===
In a quest to fulfil Murray's ambitions for Rangers in Europe, a period of unprecedented spending under the managership of Dick Advocaat saw the club's debts increase. As anticipated television revenues failed to materialise and the club's income failed to offset the growing cost of transfer fees and player salaries. In 1998 Murray said, "For every five pounds Celtic spend, we will spend ten." By 2001, with the appointment of Alex McLeish as manager, Murray acknowledged that mistakes were made, saying "we got it wrong. We obviously spent far too much money. We can't let it happen again because that would be total mismanagement." A radical programme of cost-cutting was instituted in an attempt to re-establish the club on a stable financial footing.

In 1996, ENIC Group invested £40 million in Rangers. However, disagreements with Murray over transfer spending led to ENIC's Howard Stanton resigning from the club's board of directors in May 1999. ENIC announced plans to sell their 20.2% stake in Rangers in February 2001, but after failing to find a buyer they sold to Murray for £8.9 million in August 2004.

In February 1999, with Rangers' debts mounting, the Bank of Scotland took a 7% stake in the club and secured a charge over the club's income and assets should it default on its repayments. In October 2009 Walter Smith admitted that the bank had taken control from Murray and that all the club's players had been available for transfer since the previous January. In April 2010 the bank increased its stake in Murray International Holdings to 24%, arranging a debt-for-equity swap after the firm suffered further huge losses.

On 5 July 2002, Murray had relinquished the chairmanship and limited his day-to-day involvement in the club's running. His status as by far the club's biggest share-holder remained. On 1 September 2004, Murray announced his return to the chairmanship, and with it a rights-issue to raise £50 million with which to reduce the club's debt. In doing so, Murray also saw his shareholding in the club increase to around 90% of the total stock.

Murray has claimed that he invested £100 million of his own money into Rangers while owner.

Since selling Rangers, the financial management during David Murray's reign at Rangers has come under even more criticism due to the club's entry into liquidation in February 2012. Murray sold Rangers to Craig Whyte who has maintained a stance of blaming the previous regime led by Murray for the club's problems, particularly in relation to a potential heavy tax bill brought about by the use of employee benefit trusts (EBTs). Murray, however, has played down his role in the club's financial meltdown and also denied allegations of "cheating", in relation to Rangers' use of EBTs, taking place during his time as owner.

The First-tier Tax Tribunal to decide Rangers' and Murray International Holdings' appeal against a £74 million tax bill claimed by HMRC due to the use of EBTs announced a verdict on 20 November 2012, with Rangers and MIH winning the appeal on a majority verdict. After the verdict, Murray expressed dismay at the damage caused to Rangers by the case before it had reached a decision, while also confirming a settlement of over £10 million had been offered to HMRC two years previously. He also questioned HMRC's handling of his successor Craig Whyte's actions, who had stopped paying tax and national insurance at the club which eventually led to the liquidation of Rangers' previous holding company. In the wake of the tribunal verdict, Murray International Holdings called for a police enquiry into leaked information relating to the tax tribunal proceedings, leaks that resulted in a BBC documentary and an online blog making "confidential information" public. Legal action against the leaks by Murray was underway as of 2012.

=== Sale of Rangers ===
By 2006, Murray was considering ending his involvement with Rangers. Murray himself continued to articulate a more ambiguous stance on his desire to sell or retain ownership of the club: "It's not a 'For Sale' sign per se, but obviously I don't want to do this forever." Murray announced on 26 August 2009 that he was again to step down as chairman of Rangers Football Club for personal reasons. In June 2010 Murray announced that the club was no longer actively seeking a buyer. At the time, the club and its parent company Murray International Holdings were subject to an investigation from HMRC into a tax issue, to do with payments made into offshore bank accounts.

On 6 May 2011 it was confirmed that Murray had sold his controlling interest in the club (85.3 percent) to Wavetower Limited for £1, subject to full repayment of the existing £18 million overdraft to the Bank of Scotland, provision of £5 million for investment in new playing staff per year for 4 years, and £7 million for additional working capital facilities and stadium improvements. Wavetower Limited is owned by the company Liberty Capital which in turn is ultimately owned by businessman Craig Whyte. Due to the subsequent financial meltdown of the club Murray's decision to sell to Whyte came under scrutiny, but he claimed to have been "duped" during the process.

== Rugby sponsorship ==
On 3 September 2007, Scottish Rugby announced that Sir David Murray would replace The Famous Grouse as the new sponsor of the Scotland national rugby team in a deal worth £2.7 million over an initial 3-year term which was subsequently extended by one year.

== Personal life ==
Murray's achievements in business have come in spite of the personal tragedy of the loss of both legs in 1976, following a serious car crash after a rugby match. Murray became a longstanding supporter of amputees, reflected in his establishment of the Murray Foundation in 1996. On 7 November 2006, 10 years to the day after its launch, Sir David Murray accepted The Queen's Award for Voluntary Service awarded to The Murray Foundation. Further personal tragedy followed with the death of Murray's wife Louise in 1992 from cancer. They had two sons, David (b. 1973) and Keith (b. 1975).

Murray's main interests include watching sport, collecting and producing wine. He owns two vineyards in France, Chateau Routas which is in Provence and Domaine Jessiaume in Burgundy. He was awarded Chevaliers du Tastevin in 2006 and has received numerous awards for his wines.

In June 2011 Sir David married former lawyer Kae Tinto at his Dunbarney Estate in Perthshire. They split in 2018 after seven years.

== Honours ==
Murray has been recognised through a number of awards over the course of his career. In 1984, at the age of 33, he was awarded Young Scottish Businessman of the Year. In 1986, he was awarded an honorary doctorate from Heriot-Watt University.

Murray was knighted in the 2007 New Years Honours List, for services to business in Scotland. After being named on the honours list, Murray received his knighthood from Queen Elizabeth on 4 July 2007 at a ceremony at Holyrood Palace.

In December 2008 Sir David received his Honorary Degree of Doctor honoris causa from The University of Edinburgh at a ceremony held in the McEwan Hall, Edinburgh.
