= Martin Bain =

Sports executive

Martin Edward Bain (born July 1968) is a British football executive. He was formerly Chief Executive officer of Scottish club Rangers, the CEO of FSDL, the organising company of Indian Super League. He has also been the CEO of English club Sunderland A.F.C, and Maccabi Tel Aviv.

== Life and career ==
Bain was born and brought up in Glasgow and attended Glasgow University. He worked for Rangers FC from 1996 where he was Commercial Director and Director of Football before being appointed as Chief Executive by Chairman Sir David Murray in February 2005. He joined the board of Directors in September 2001.

In July 2008, Bain was elected to the Scottish Premier League's board of Directors for a second term.

On 6 May 2011, Rangers F.C. was sold by David Murray, the majority shareholder, to Craig Whyte. As part of an independent panel set up to represent 27,000 minority shareholders in the sales transaction, Bain refused to agree to the sale. Bain resigned in June 2011 and raised an action in the Court of Session in relation to a breach of his employment contract. He settled his damages claim out of court in March 2012.

Following the administrative crisis which engulfed Rangers subsequently, during an SFA tribunal in May 2012 it transpired that Bain presented diligence to Sir David Murray at the time of the sale that proved his stance at the time of the takeover to be the correct one.

Bain was appointed chief executive of Israeli club Maccabi Tel Aviv in September 2014. During his time in Israel, the club won the domestic treble in 2015 and qualified for the Champions League Bain was also a director of the Israeli Premier League, helping negotiate its biggest ever broadcast deal

In 2016, Bain joined the Premier league as Chief Executive of Sunderland A.F.C. and left the club in May 2018 following its sale to Stewart Donald,

On 11 October 2019, Bain was appointed as CEO of Football Sports Development Ltd., organisers of the Indian Super League, the top-tier football league in India.

== Advisory roles ==
Martin Bain was the Non Executive Chairman of The Scottish Council of Independent Schools (SCIS) until September 2025.

From 2007 to 2009 he was a Non Executive Chairman of the Glasgow Children's Hospital Charity.

He was Director of the Rangers Charity Foundation from 2005 to 2010.
