= Iain Brines =

Scottish football referee

Iain Robertson Brines
- Born: 22 July 1967 (age 58)
- Occupation: Football referee

Iain Robertson Brines (born 22 July 1967) is a former Scottish football referee in the Scottish Premier League. Brines had been a referee since 1989 and was a FIFA-listed referee from 2003; as of 2013, however, he was no longer included on the FIFA list, having reached the international retirement age of 45. He refereed in full international matches, as well as matches in the UEFA Champions League and UEFA Cup tournaments.

Outwith football, he worked as a police officer.
