= Dougie McDonald =

Scottish football referee (born 1965)

Douglas McDonald (born 8 October 1965) is a former FIFA International soccer referee and Scottish Category 1 referee.

McDonald is a transport planner by profession, and currently is Director of Transport for Stantec in Scotland. He is still also involved in football, working as a Referee Development Advisor in Youth and Junior football.

== Refereeing career ==
McDonald's refereeing career spanned 29 years; 14 years from 1997 as a Category 1 referee and 11 years from 2000 as a FIFA international referee until his retirement in 2010. His first Category 1 match was Berwick Rangers v Montrose in August 1997.

McDonald refereed two Scottish Cup Finals, the 2006 match between Hearts and Gretna, and the 2010 match between Dundee United and Ross County. He also took charge of two League Cup Finals; the 2007 Final between Hibernian and Kilmarnock, and the 2009 Final between Celtic and Rangers. McDonald refereed 221 Scottish Premier League games, five Old Firm matches, three Edinburgh Derbies, two Dundee Derbies and over 100 international matches. In addition to his four senior national cup finals, he also refereed three League Cup Semi-Finals (in 2005 between Motherwell and Hearts, in 2006 between Dunfermline Athletic and Livingston and in 2010 between Rangers and St Johnstone) and three Scottish Cup Semi-Finals (in 2003 between Inverness Caledonian Thistle and Dundee, in 2008 between St Johnstone and Rangers and in 2009 between Falkirk and Dunfermline Athletic. In 2004, he was also Fourth Official at the Dunfermline Athletic v Celtic Scottish Cup Final. McDonald was also the referee at a win by Inverness Caledonian Thistle over Celtic in the Scottish Cup in 2000 which prompted the headline in The Sun - "Super Caley Go Ballistic Celtic are Atrocious".

McDonald also refereed the 2002 Scottish Qualifying Cup Final (North) between Cove Rangers and Keith; the 1999 SFA Youth Cup Final between Celtic and Dundee and the 1997 Reserve League Cup Final between Hearts and Aberdeen.

McDonald also had a successful international career. He was twice Fourth Official at the Final of the prestigious Dallas Cup and he also refereed the 2009 Final between São Paulo and Vancouver Whitecaps. He was also involved in the inaugural experiments for the use of additional referees behind the goal, operating at one of the initial experiment tournaments in Cyprus in 2009 and in the 2009–10 Europa League experiments where he refereed several group matches.

McDonald refereed at the inaugural UEFA Regions Cup Final tournament in Venice in 1999 where he was Fourth Official at the Final; at the UEFA U16 Championship Finals in Israel in 2000; and at the UEFA U19 Championship Finals in Switzerland in 2004.

McDonald retired as a Category 1 referee on 29 November 2010, and since 2013 he has been operating as a referee development advisor in youth and junior football.

=== Dundee United v Celtic penalty ===
During a Scottish Premier League match on 17 October 2010 between Dundee United and Celtic, McDonald awarded a penalty kick to Celtic in the 70th minute, but later reversed the decision after consulting one of the assistant referees. The incident became the subject of an investigation. McDonald was censured by the SFA Referee Committee for lying in his post-match report about the circumstances surrounding his decision not to award the penalty kick. The assistant referee involved was given a lifetime ban.

In July 2014, several links to articles relating to the penalty incident at Dundee United were removed from Google's search results under the EU Court of Justice's Right to be forgotten ruling. Following complaints about the decision, Google restored its links to articles in The Guardian newspaper about McDonald. The attempt to have the links removed drew more attention to the matter, and was seen as an example of the Streisand effect.

== Professional career ==
McDonald is a transport planner by profession, having worked at MVA Consultancy (now SYSTRA) for 25 years. In May 2014 he joined Peter Brett Associates (now Stantec) as their Director of Transport in Scotland.
