= History of Rangers F.C. =

Scottish association football club history

Rangers Football Club, formed in 1872, is an association football club in Scotland. Rangers was the first club in the world to win more than fifty national league titles, although their record has since been broken by their Glasgow rivals Celtic.

This article covers the club's beginnings, while also documenting its European Cup Winners Cup success, the 1902 and 1971 Ibrox disasters, the nine-in-a-row league championship win, its financial insolvency of the early 2010s and subsequent rise through the lower leagues, and its first top-flight championship since 2011.

== Formation and early years (1872–1899) ==
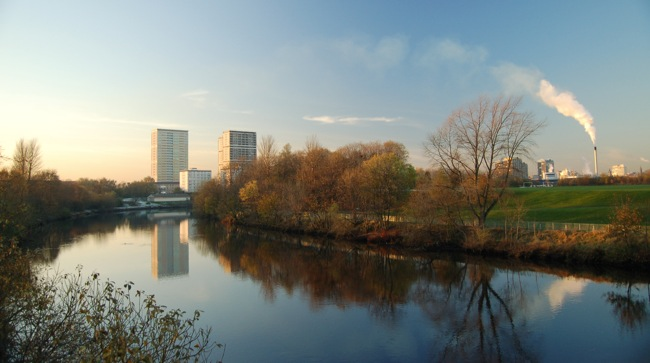
Modern-day picture of Flesher's Haugh, where Rangers played its first game

In March 1872, Rangers Football Club was formed by brothers Moses McNeil and Peter McNeil, Peter Campbell, William McBeath and David Hill, a group of rowing enthusiasts.

The team's first game was a goalless draw against Callander on Glasgow Green's Flesher's Haugh in May 1872. Moses McNeil suggested the name Rangers after seeing the name "Swindon Rangers" in a book about English rugby. Rangers played two matches in their birth year; their second, with the team wearing light-blue shirts, was a comprehensive 11–0 win over a team named Clyde (not the present Clyde).

For the 1875–76 season, Rangers moved to Burnbank Park.

Rangers began to grow into a more formal football club, and in 1876 their first player was called up to play international football. Moses McNeil made his Scotland debut against Wales. In 1883, the Glasgow Football Association was formed, with Rangers one of its six founder members.

In 1888, the Old Firm fixture was born when Rangers met Celtic for the first time in a friendly match. Celtic won 5–2.

The 1890–91 season saw the inception of the Scottish Football League, and Rangers were one of its ten original members. By this time, Rangers were playing at the first Ibrox Stadium. Their first-ever league match took place on 16 August 1890 and resulted in a 5–2 victory over Edinburgh club Heart of Midlothian. After finishing joint-top with Dumbarton, a play-off was held at Cathkin Park to decide the championship. The match finished 2–2, and the title was shared for the only time in its history. It was the first of Rangers' world-record 55 championships.

Rangers lost their first two Scottish Cup Finals, to Vale of Leven in 1877 and 1879, but lifted the trophy in 1894 for the first time after a 3–1 win over Celtic. Rangers even came close to winning the English FA Cup in 1887, when they lost to Aston Villa in the semi-final.

Rangers enjoyed further Scottish Cup wins in 1897 and 1898.

== The Wilton years (1899–1920) ==
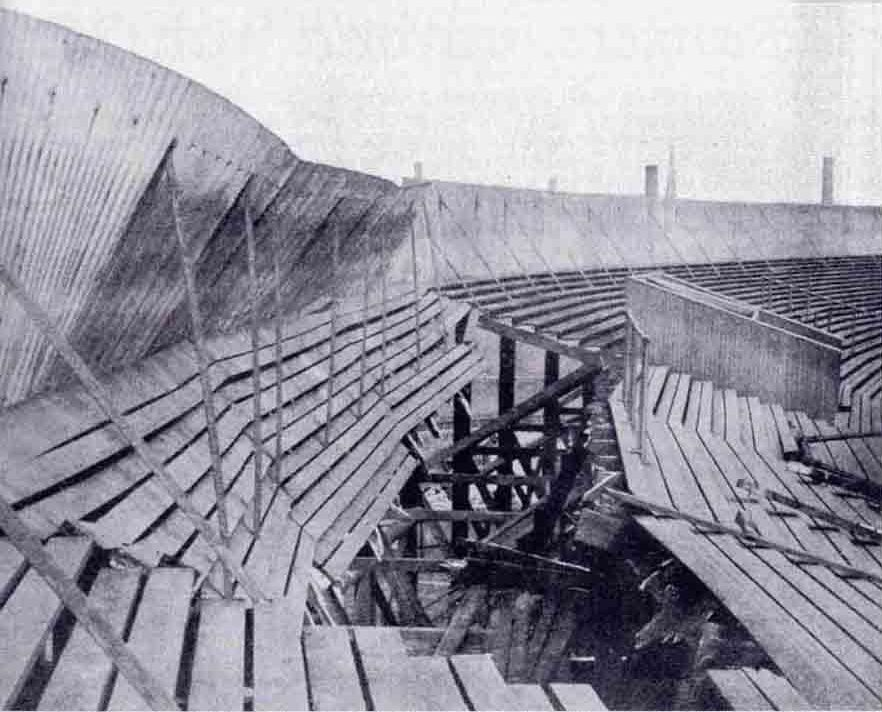
The aftermath of the 1902 Ibrox disaster

Rangers formally became a limited company on 27 May 1899, and their match secretary William Wilton was appointed as the club's first manager. Today's Ibrox Stadium (known then as Ibrox Park) was constructed the same year. The club also appointed its first board of directors under the chairmanship of James Henderson.

Rangers were in the ascendancy at the turn of the century, winning the championship seven times between 1900 and 1918 (including four in a row). The 1898–99 season saw the Gers win all eighteen league games to establish a perfect record. This feat has yet to be repeated by the club, although the team did go through the 2013–14 and 2020–21 seasons unbeaten.

Between 1902 and 1910, Celtic became the dominant force, and though Rangers had the chance to foil a third league and cup double in 1909, the Scottish FA withheld the cup due to a pitch invasion by supporters. Both clubs were ordered to compensate hosts Queen's Park for the damage caused by the fans.

Having lost the title in 1919, Rangers responded in 1920 with one of the best seasons in their history as Wilton and his right-hand man Bill Struth retained the title, with the club scoring 106 goals in 42 league games.

Wilton died in a boating accident in May 1920, and Bill Struth was appointed manager.

== Struth's era (1920–1954) ==
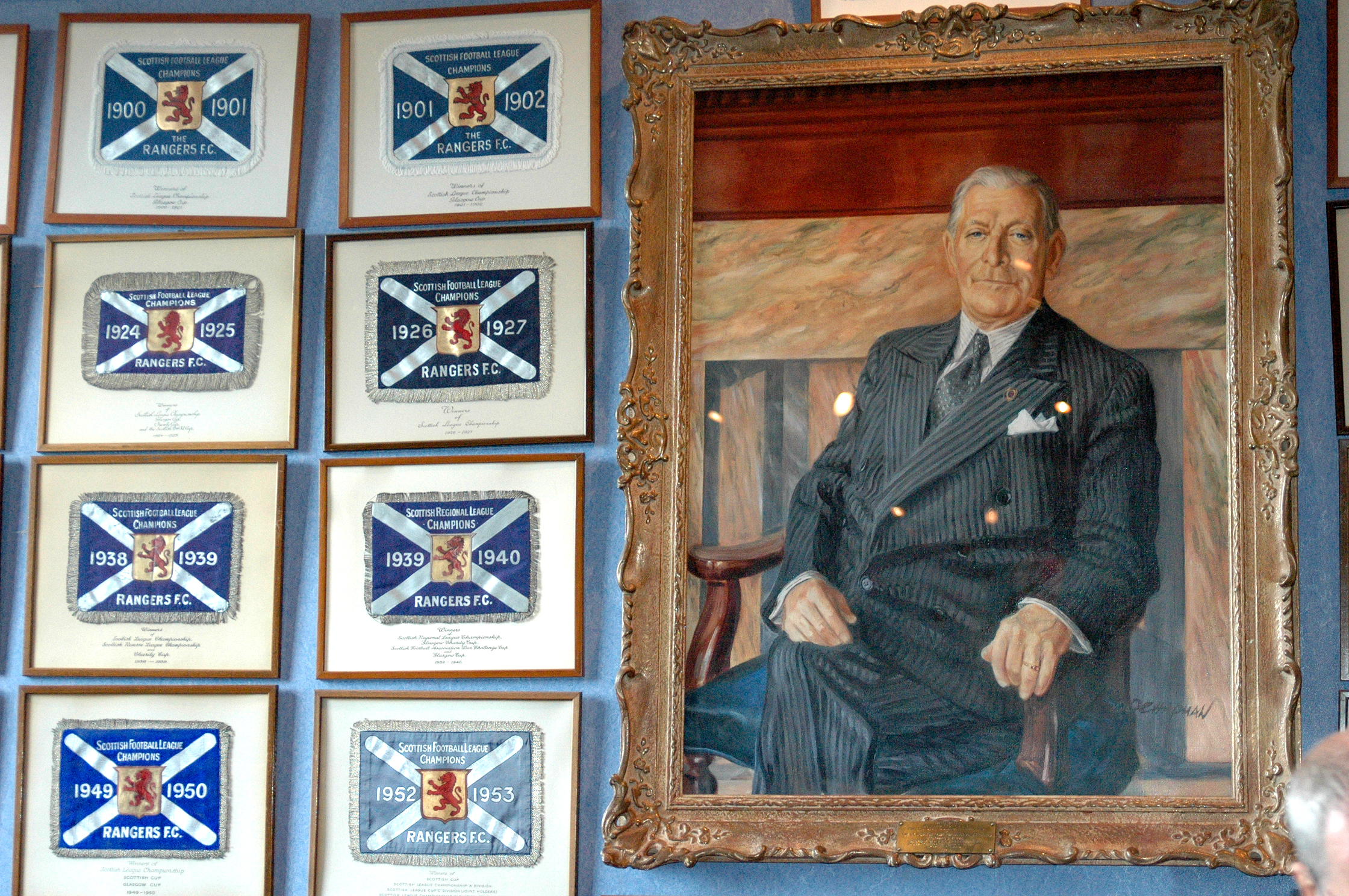
The portrait of Bill Struth within the Ibrox trophy room

The key statistic of the 1930s was three consecutive Scottish Cup wins between 1934 and 1936. Rangers then lost in the first round of the 1937 competition to Queen of the South. This was the first Rangers game ever to be captured on film.

The post-war seasons saw Rangers dominate, but not before a boardroom coup in the summer of 1947. The board of Rangers had previously been an amateur body made up of former players, but when chairman James Bowie suggested a 71-year-old Struth retire in order to allow a younger man to take charge, a revolution occurred. Bowie was forced out the chair and was said never to have set foot in Ibrox ever again, such was his disdain for the circumstances of his departure.

Struth went on to steer Rangers to eighteen league championships, ten Scottish Cups and two League Cups in his 34-year tenure as manager. He was also the first manager in the history of Scottish football to win the domestic treble, in season 1948–49. The success was based on the so-called Iron Curtain defence, which remained virtually unchanged from 1946 to 1953.

Under Struth's reign, Rangers managed to set a new record of becoming the first club in Britain and second club in Europe (after MTK Budapest) to win nine consecutive league championships (from the 1938–39 to 1946–47 seasons), although the middle seven were wartime competitions considered to be unofficial.

After Bill Struth collected two more domestic doubles, in 1950 and 1953, Scot Symon was appointed as Rangers' third manager on 15 June 1954.

== Under Symon (1954–1967) ==
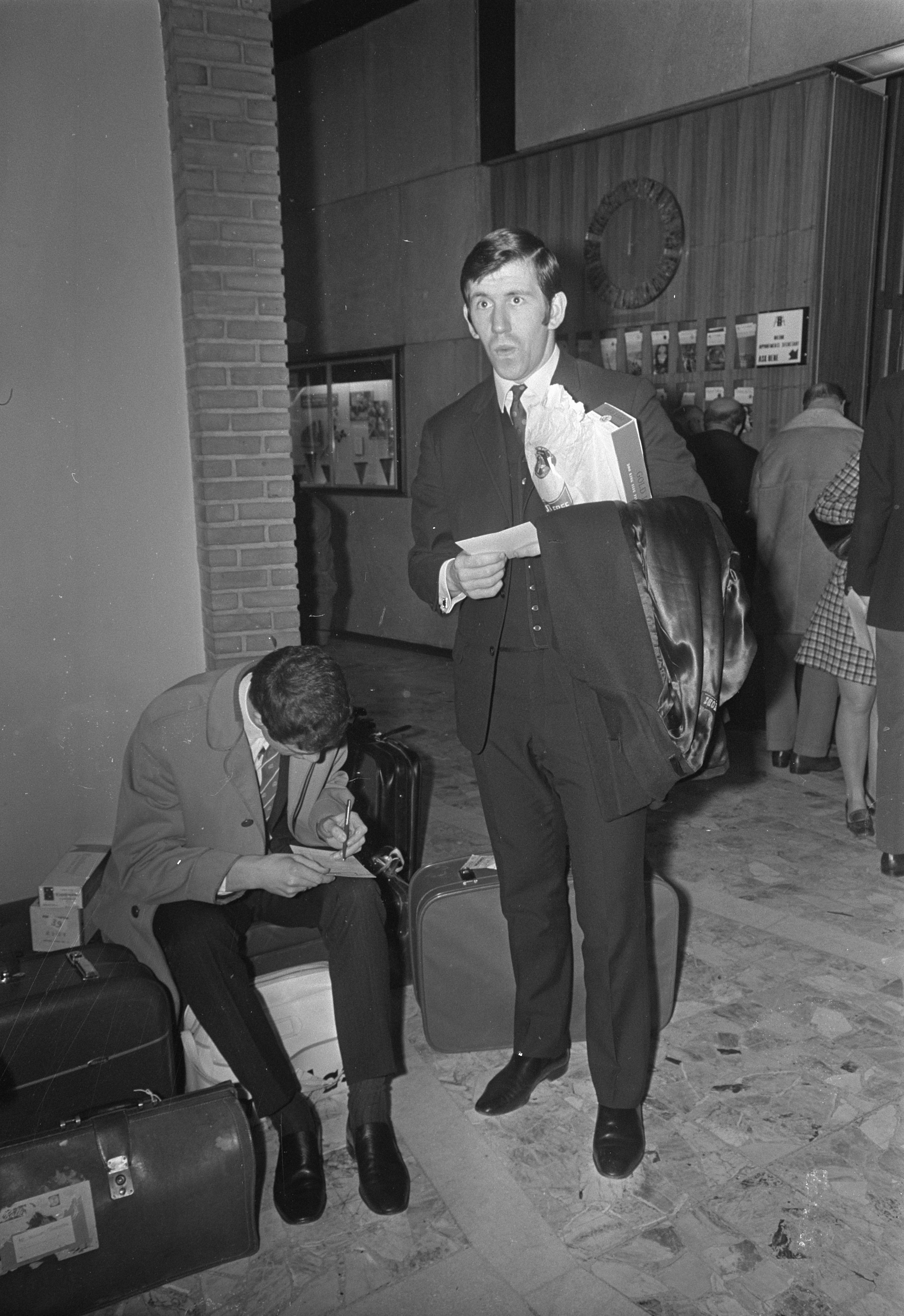
John Greig in Amsterdam with Rangers for the Inter-Cities Fairs Cup, January 1969

Symon continued Struth's success by winning six league championships, five Scottish Cups and four League Cups. He also became the second manager to win the domestic treble, in season 1963–64. Another purple patch began at the end of the 1950s: from 1957 until 1965, Rangers achieved four league titles, plus an equal number of wins in both the League and Scottish Cups. Jim Baxter was a notable Rangers player during this period.

Baxter departed for England in 1965, but the void he left was filled by John Greig, and although Rangers finished the decade in the shadow of their European Cup-winning neighbours, the foundations were being laid for future success.

In the 1956–57 season, Symon took Rangers into the European Cup for the first time, but it ended quickly when they were knocked out by Nice. The following season saw Rangers suffer their worst-ever defeat by their arch rivals, with Celtic beating them 7–1 in the 1957 League Cup Final.

Rangers reached the semi-finals of the European Cup in 1960, losing to Eintracht Frankfurt by a record aggregate for a Scottish team of 12–4. In 1961, Rangers became the first British team to reach a European final when they contested the Cup Winners' Cup Final against Fiorentina. They lost 4–1 on aggregate. Rangers reached the final again in 1967, losing 1–0 after extra time to Bayern Munich.

Following the death of incumbent chairman John Wilson in 1963, Rangers appointed John Lawrence as his successor. Lawrence had been on the board of Rangers since the mid-1950s and remained in charge for a decade before he resigned to become honorary president. During his tenure as chairman, Lawrence oversaw two of the most pivotal events in the club's history, namely the 1971 Ibrox disaster and the 1972 European Cup Winners' Cup Final. His legacy continued in the shape of his grandson Lawrence Marlborough, who inherited his shareholding and was appointed vice-chairman in 1979. Marlborough went on to revitalise the fortunes of the club in the 1980s, before selling his stake in the club's parent company to David Murray in 1988.

Symon paid the penalty of Celtic's comparative success in Scotland and Europe in October 1967, giving way to his former assistant Davie White after rejecting a move to make him general manager with White in charge of team affairs.

== White takes charge (1967–1969) ==
34-year-old White was installed as Rangers' fourth manager on 1 November 1967. He had initially come to Rangers as assistant to manager Symon as part of a grooming process, giving him time to learn the ropes and take over when he was ready; however, White was on his own and in charge after five months at the club.

When White took up the reins at Rangers, the team had failed to win the league championship in three seasons, the longest title drought in fifty years. White won all but one of his first twenty league matches in charge, amassing 39 point out of a possible 40. The only blemish was a 2–2 draw at Celtic Park on 2 January 1968.

The Scottish Cup gave White his first defeat as Rangers manager. A third-round replay, against Hearts on 13 March 1968, looked to be heading for extra time when, in the 87th minute, Donald Ford struck the winner for the Edinburgh club. Rangers were out the cup, White's only loss in his first thirty domestic games in charge. A couple of draws in April, and White's first league defeat in the final minute of the final game of the season, 3–2 at home to Aberdeen, cost Rangers the title by two points. Despite accumulating the highest percentage of points won by any Rangers side since Bill Struth's first season, and collecting 61 points, Rangers were beaten to the title by Celtic by two points.

In the Inter-Cities Fairs Cup campaign that season, Rangers reached the quarter-finals, meeting Leeds United in March 1968. After a goalless draw at Ibrox, two goals in six minutes at Elland Road in the second leg were enough to see Leeds progress 2–0 aggregate. The Yorkshire club went on to win the competition.

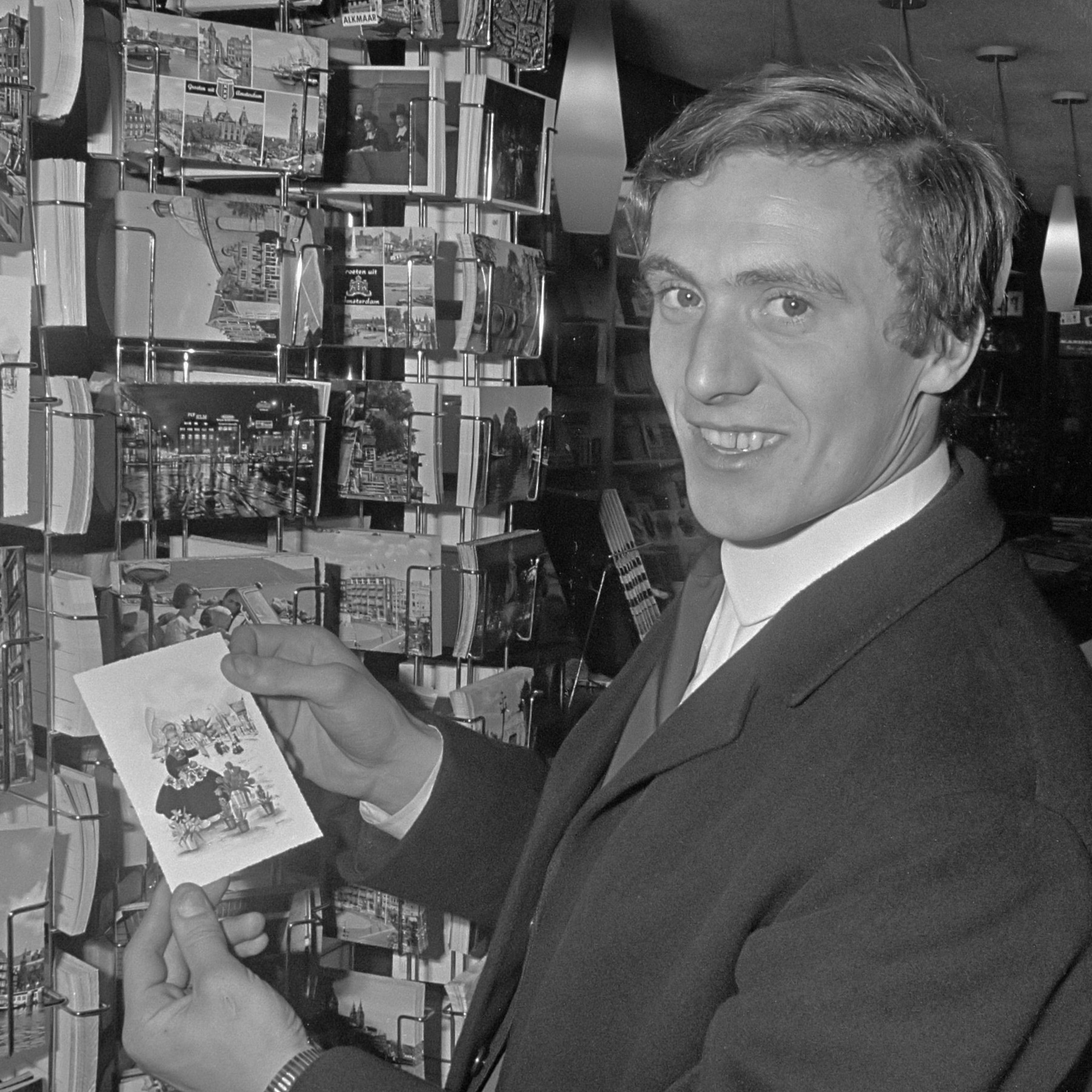
Colin Stein became Scotland's most expensive footballer upon joining Rangers in 1968

The 1968–69 season was White's only full season in charge at the club. He made two major signings at the start of the season. The first was when he broke the Scottish transfer record and outbid the English Champions Everton to buy Colin Stein from Hibernian for £100,000. Secondly, he paid St Johnstone £50,000 for Alex MacDonald. The league campaign until the end of November was inconsistent, four draws and three defeats from thirteen matches, although the side did win the first Old Firm match 4–2 at Celtic Park. Rangers went on a run from December until April in which they lost only once in all competitions, 3–2 away to Airdrieonians in the league.

In the second half of March, Rangers beat Clyde 6–0 at Ibrox in the league, beat Athletic Bilbao 4–1 at home in the Fairs Cup, and were 6–1 victors against Aberdeen in the Scottish Cup semi-final. Stein's disciplinary record caught up with him, and he was suspended from the end of March until the end of the season. Without his goals, the team dropped six points from the final six league games and conceded the title to Celtic by five points.

The route to the 1969 Scottish Cup Final saw Rangers dispose of Hibernian, Hearts and Airdrieonians, before meeting Aberdeen in the semi-final. In the final, with Stein suspended, White opted to play Alex Ferguson rather than Sandy Jardine, purely because of the aerial threat of Billy McNeill at corners. Ferguson was blamed for a goal that Rangers conceded two minutes into the match in which he was designated to mark goalscorer McNeill. Two mistakes from Örjan Persson and Norrie Martin, minutes before the interval, were both seized upon by the 20-year-old George Connolly, resulting in two goals to give Celtic a 3–0 lead at half-time. Rangers lost the game 4–0, and Ferguson was subsequently forced to play for the club's junior side.

The Fairs Cup proved fertile once again: Rangers went all the way to the semi-finals, defeating FK Vojvodina (2–1 on aggregate), Dundalk (9–1 on aggregate), DWS Amsterdam (4–1 on aggregate), Bilbao (4–3 on aggregate), before losing 2–0 on aggregate to eventual winners Newcastle United.

Having re-signed Jim Baxter at the start of the 1969–70 season, White's faith was repaid immediately when, in his first game back at Ibrox, Baxter was part of a notable 2–1 comeback victory over Celtic in the League Cup sectional round. In the Cup Winners' Cup, Rangers beat FCSB 2–0 at home, and held out in Bucharest for a goalless draw, in which John Greig was played in a sweeper's role.

In the second round, Rangers lost to Górnik Zabrze. White was sacked as manager. The next day, 27 November 1969, White's assistant Willie Thornton took over as caretaker and the club began to look for a new manager. In White's two seasons in charge, Rangers had finished two points and five points, respectively, behind Celtic. Willie Waddell, the former Rangers winger, was brought in as White's full-time successor. Waddell had won the championship in 1965 as manager of Kilmarnock, before returning to journalism with the Daily Express.

With Waddell in charge, the next three seasons saw Rangers finish twelve, fifteen and sixteen points adrift of Celtic in the championship race. The team also failed to beat Celtic in ten of the eleven games it played with Waddell at the helm.

== Waddell era: European success and national tragedy (1969–1972) ==
Waddell soon enforced a renewed discipline and order to the squad, and in 1972 he guided Rangers to their first and, to date, only European triumph when they defeated Dynamo Moscow 3–2 in the Cup Winners' Cup final at the Camp Nou in Barcelona. Due to a pitch invasion at the end of the match, the team were presented with the trophy in the dressing room, and UEFA banned Rangers from defending the cup.

Within weeks of their European success, Waddell moved into a general-manager position, and his coach Jock Wallace was appointed as manager. The reasons for the 51-year-old Waddell relinquishing the reins at Rangers were never fully explained, but the triumph in the Cup Winners' Cup came sixteen months after the 1971 Ibrox disaster, in which 66 people died leaving the east terrace at staircase 13; after helping the families of the victims and forging strong links with supporters' clubs, Waddell was determined to complete the resultant reconstruction of Ibrox Stadium.

== Wallace becomes manager (1972–1978) ==
Jock Wallace's managership of Rangers saw the club achieve a period of sustained success. His first season as manager, 1972–73, was the club's centenary year. After taking over the first-team manager's position on 31 May 1972, Wallace set about reshaping the side. He moved on Colin Stein and Willie Johnston to Coventry City and West Bromwich Albion, respectively, bringing in Quinton Young, Joe Mason and Tom Forsyth.

After a stuttering start to the league campaign, including three defeats and a draw from their first six matches, Rangers' fortunes improved. From October to the end of the season, they suffered only one league defeat, at home to Hearts on 2 December 1972, and went on a run of sixteen victories; however, this run was not enough to beat Celtic to the championship. The Hoops claimed the title by a single point.

In the cup competitions, Rangers' Scottish Cup campaign culminated in a 3–2 win over Celtic. The final was attended by Princess Alexandra along with 122,714 other spectators. It was Rangers' first success in the competition in seven years. Their League Cup run was ended in the semi-finals at the hands of Hibernian after a single-goal defeat.

The 1972–73 season also saw inaugural competition in the European Super Cup. The side played the European Cup holders Ajax in January 1973. The Dutch side were the only continental opposition Rangers faced that season due to the club's European competition ban. Ajax recorded a 6–3 aggregate win, with Rangers losing 1–3 at Ibrox and 3–2 in Amsterdam.

In the summer of 1973, Rangers chairman John Lawerence retired and was replaced by vice-chairman Matt Taylor.

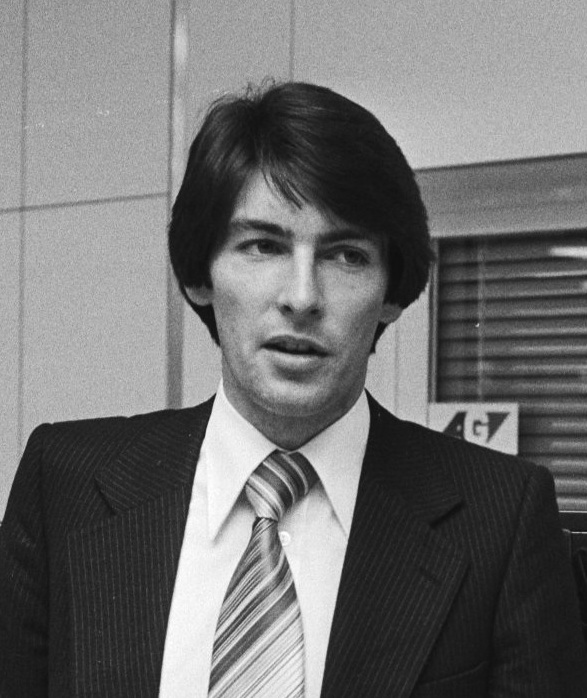
Gordon Smith, pictured here not long after he joined Rangers in 1977, was one of several big-money signings by Jock Wallace

A nine-year period of Celtic dominance in the league was ended in 1974–75 as Rangers captured what was to be the last championship of its kind. The new ten-team Scottish Premier Division saw Rangers crowned inaugural champions, as part of a triumphant domestic treble. A barren season followed in 1976–77, however.

Jock Wallace presided over the club's fourth domestic treble, and their second in three years, in 1977–78. During the close season, Rangers spent heavily in the transfer market, bringing in Davie Cooper from Clydebank for £100,000 and Gordon Smith from Kilmarnock for £65,000. They were joined at the club by Bobby Russell, who arrived from Shettleston Juniors on a free transfer.

Despite these expensive signings, Rangers did not make the best start to the league campaign, losing the opening two matches to Aberdeen and Hibernian. Order was restored the following week with a 4–0 defeat of Partick Thistle. Rangers beat Celtic 3–2 in the first Old Firm match of the season, having been 2–0 down at half-time. In March 1978, second-placed Aberdeen won 3–0 at Ibrox to set up a tense title run-in. Rangers dropped seven points from twenty-one but held on by winning the final four fixtures to clinch the title.

The League Cup was won by defeating Celtic 2–1 after extra time. Goals from season new signings Cooper and Smith completed the first leg of the treble. The 2–1 1978 Scottish Cup Final win over Aberdeen made Wallace the only Rangers manager to win two domestic trebles. Despite this unprecedented success, Wallace resigned from his position on 23 May 1978. The reason for his departure was never stated, but it is believed that a breakdown in the working relationship between Wallace and general manager William Waddell was the cause. At a time when Ibrox Stadium was undergoing extensive redevelopment, the transfer budget was to suffer. Waddell was suspected of vetoing many signings, including Alan Hansen from Partick Thistle and David Narey from Dundee United, in favour of investing in the rebuilding project.

The burst of success under Wallace in the mid-1970s saw Rangers once again established as Scotland's most successful club. When Wallace, suddenly and unexpectedly, announced his resignation, Rangers turned to another former player, John Greig.

== John Greig, from captain to manager (1978–1983) ==
After the departure of Wallace, the board acted quickly to replace the void with captain Greig being promoted to first-team manager. Greig took a phone call on the day of Wallace's resignation from general manager Waddell. Greig was playing golf with teammate Sandy Jardine when Waddell called him to offer him the job. On 24 May 1978, Greig was confirmed as the seventh manager of Rangers.

In the 1978–79 season, despite a fixture pile-up which resulted from the club playing three league games in nearly three months, Rangers came close to winning a quadruple of trophies. The season ended with a domestic cup double.

Wallace's treble-winning team of the previous season carried the team in the 1978–79 European Cup. Rangers eliminated Juventus after defeating the Italians 2–1 on aggregate – the first time Rangers had ever recovered from a first-leg defeat to win a two-legged European tie. Dutch side PSV Eindhoven, the then UEFA Cup holders, were overcome in the next round (the club's first home defeat in European competition), before an injury-stricken Rangers side lost to Cologne at the quarter-finals stage.

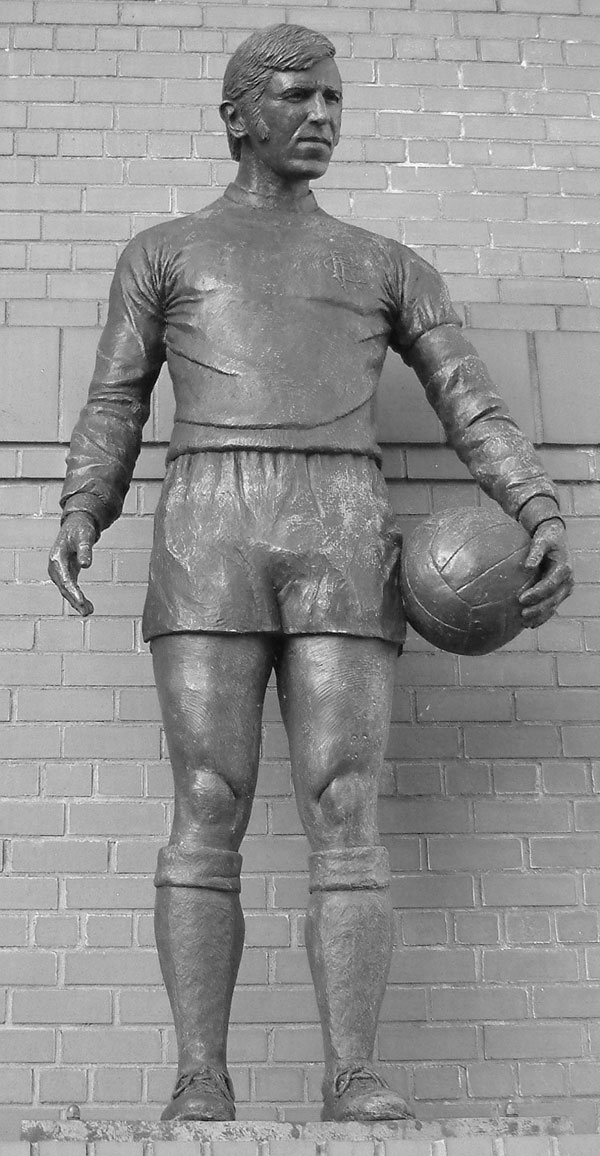
John Greig's statue outside Ibrox

Poor early-season league form saw the team fail to win any of the first six league matches, but a run was eventually put together. Things began to unravel again, however, as leadership of the league evaporated. The team had to settle for second place behind Celtic. The pivotal match was a 4–2 Old Firm defeat at Parkhead. There was success for Greig in the national cup competitions. Victory in the 1979 Scottish Cup Final over Hibernian required a second replay to separate the sides before Rangers eventually won 3–2. The 1979 Scottish League Cup Final ended in a 2–1 win for Rangers over a strong Aberdeen with goals from Alex MacDonald and Colin Jackson.

The following season finished trophyless. Rangers finished fifth in the league, eleven points behind champions Aberdeen, who also knocked them out of the Scottish League Cup over a two-legged third-round tie. Rangers did reach the 1980 Scottish Cup Final, only to lose out to Celtic after a deflected George McCluskey shot in extra time. The European Cup Winner's Cup campaign was ended by the eventual winners Valencia after having seen off Lillestrøm and Fortuna Düsseldorf in previous rounds.

The summer of 1980 saw Greig bring in Jim Bett from Lokeren for £150,000. Bett was joined by Colin McAdam, a £165,000 signing from Partick Thistle. The side began the season with a fifteen-match unbeaten run, including two Old Firm wins, which ended in November. A poor run in November and December all but ended the title challenge as the team finished third, twelve points behind champions Celtic. The League Cup campaign was halted after a controversial defeat by Aberdeen in a match in which the Dons were awarded two contentious penalties. Due to having no European participation, Rangers entered the Anglo-Scottish Cup, which led to defeat at the hands of English minnows Chesterfield. The Third Division side held Rangers to a 1–1 draw at Ibrox before defeating Rangers 3–0 in the leg at Saltergate. Rangers did win the 1981 Scottish Cup Final after beating Dundee United 4–1 in a final replay. After a goalless draw, during which Ian Redford missed a last-minute penalty, Rangers won the replay with goals from Davie Cooper, a John MacDonald double and Bobby Russell.

Greig's fourth season in charge, 1981–82, ended yet again without the league championship. Rangers finished third, twelve points behind champions Celtic.

There followed the surprise signing of Northern Ireland international John McClelland from Mansfield Town. The Ulsterman later became club captain. European participation was halted by Dukla Prague, who soundly beat the team 3–0 in Prague. A 2–1 second-leg win for Rangers was not enough for the team to progress. The domestic cup competitions provided successful ground as Rangers reached both finals. The team lost the 1982 Scottish Cup Final 4–1 to Aberdeen, despite leading for the majority of the match. A late Aberdeen equaliser took the game into extra time, before Aberdeen scored three more goals. Rangers did win the 1982 Scottish League Cup Final by defeating Dundee United 2–1 with goals from Davie Cooper and Ian Redford.

Greig made big-money signings in the pre-season of 1982–83 with renewed hope that they could at least mount a serious title challenge, but once again, the season ended trophyless. Dave MacKinnon (£30,000 from Partick Thistle), Craig Paterson (£200,000 from Hibernian), Robert Prytz (from Malmö) and Sandy Clark (from West Ham) all arrived at the club.

Rangers reached the 1983 Scottish League Cup Final, scoring 29 goals in their ten games, and eliminated Borussia Dortmund from the UEFA Cup. The opening eight league games saw the side unbeaten, but the final match saw Rangers lying in fourth, eighteen points behind eventual champions Dundee United. The team was knocked out of Europe after suffering a 5–0 defeat to Cologne. The 1983 Scottish Cup Final was lost to an Aberdeen side that had won the European Cup Winner's Cup ten days earlier.

The 1983–84 season signalled the end of John Greig's managerial career. The league season began with Rangers obtaining one point from the first four league games, although the team did win their six League Cup games under Greig. A fruitful brief run in the European Cup Winner's Cup saw Rangers win the second round, first leg tie 2–1 against Porto after the team's record-breaking 18–0 aggregate win over Maltese champions Valletta. After the first nine league games, Greig's team had collected ten points from twenty-seven. In the end, the pressure was too much and Greig resigned from his post on 28 October 1983.

During this period, attendances at Ibrox dwindled from an average 25,628 in season 1978–79 to 17,681 in 1982–83.

== Return of Wallace (1983–1986) ==
Rangers brought Jock Wallace back to the club following his exile in England with Leicester City. Wallace, though, was not the club's first choice: Jim McLean and Alex Ferguson, the then managers of the New Firm clubs, both rebuffed Rangers' advances. McLean's brother, Tommy, was appointed caretaker manager, and four games passed before a permanent manager was in position.

On 10 November 1983, Wallace was persuaded by the Rangers board to leave Motherwell and return to the club. Wallace's initial impact was positive, boosting morale and fitness. He made changes to the coaching staff, bringing in Alex Totten as first-team coach, with Tommy McLean, David Provan and Joe Mason leaving the club. Wallace also added to the squad during the season: Bobby Williamson arrived from Clydebank, Nicky Walker from Wallace's old club Motherwell, and Stuart Munro from Alloa Athletic.

Wallace's first match back in the hotseat was at Pittodrie on 12 November 1983. The game ended in a 3–0 victory for Aberdeen, but Rangers went on a 22-match unbeaten run in all competitions thenceforth until March 1984. They ended the season fourth in the league, fifteen points behind champions Aberdeen. The club did win a trophy, the League Cup. The League Cup Final was an extra-time victory over Celtic, with Ally McCoist scoring a hat-trick in a 3–2 win.

The 1984–85 season, Wallace's first full season in charge since his return, was almost a carbon-copy of the previous campaign. Rangers again finished fourth in the league, but it was by a record twenty-one-point margin behind champions Aberdeen. This performance was not caused due to a lack of investment in the playing squad, for a total of £495,000 was spent bringing in Iain Ferguson and Cammy Fraser from Dundee, Ted McMinn from Queen of the South, and the return of Derek Johnstone from Chelsea. The club won the Scottish League Cup for the second season in a row, defeating Dundee United in the Final. A solitary Iain Ferguson strike gave Rangers the win.

At the start of Wallace's second full season in charge, five wins out of six matches in the league were attained, plus a further two wins in the League Cup; however, things quickly began to sour as a fall out between manager and then club captain John McClelland saw the latter stripped of the captaincy. McClelland was soon sold to Watford in November 1985 for £265,000. By the turn of the new year, Rangers were in third position in the league. From 1 January 1986, the side won only a quarter of the remaining sixteen league fixtures. There was no hope of a trophy, after defeats in the Scottish Cup third round and the League Cup semi-final.

Wallace resigned as manager of the club on 7 April 1986. He was to jump before being pushed by the then newly appointed Rangers chairman David Holmes. Holmes had gone on record saying that the slump the club was in could not be allowed to go on. Wallace's side might have won the League Cup twice in a row, but the league form remained indifferent. The continuing dominance of the Aberdeen side of the 1980s, coupled with strong Dundee United and Celtic teams that offered periodic challenges to Aberdeen's ascendancy, placed Wallace under increasing pressure. By the 1985–86 season, Rangers had slipped to fifth place in the league.

The search for Wallace's replacement was a brief one.

== The Souness revolution (1986–1991) ==
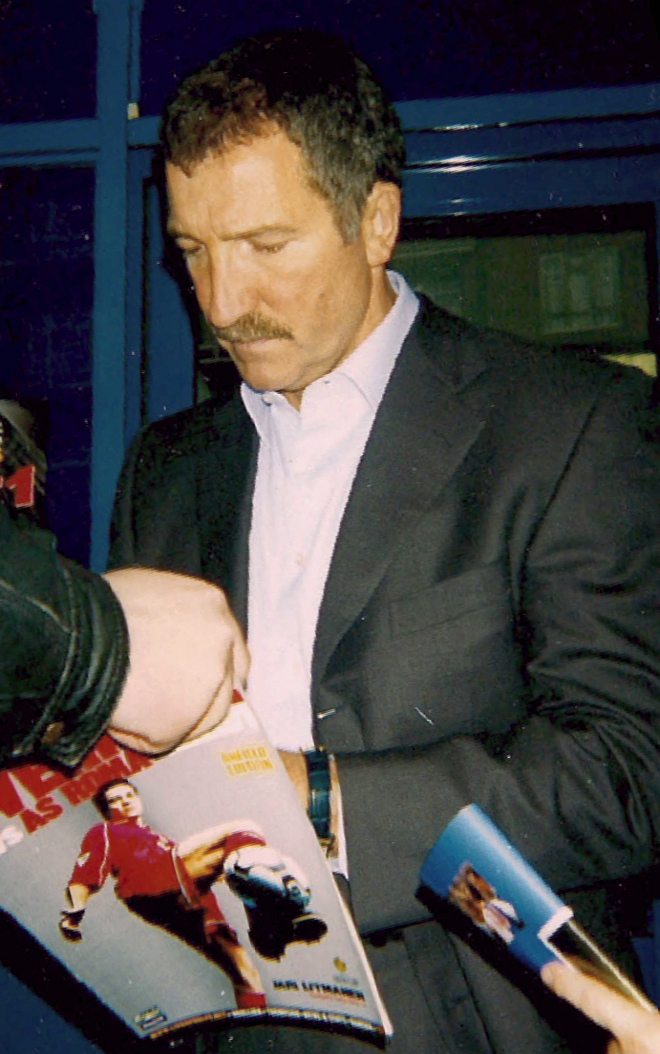
Grame Souness', Rangers' first player-manager

On 7 April 1986, Graeme Souness was appointed as Rangers' first player-manager by chairman David Holmes. Souness had previously been playing in Italy with Sampdoria, and made the move to Glasgow for a £300,000 fee. This was the first of many big-money transfer deals to be made at Ibrox. Souness' first moves were to bring in Walter Smith from Dundee United as his assistant and ex-Coventry City manager Don Mackay as reserve-team coach.

Souness' first match in charge of Rangers was the club's final league fixture of the season, on 3 May 1986. Souness and Smith were introduced to the 22,000 crowd at Ibrox and were given a rousing reception. The team then went on to defeat Motherwell 2–0 to clinch the final qualification spot for the following season's UEFA Cup in what had been an otherwise unnotable year for the club. Six days later, Souness won his first trophy at Rangers when they defeated Celtic 3–2 after extra time in the Glasgow Cup Final, Ally McCoist scored a hat-trick in front of over 40,000 fans at Ibrox.

Souness' first flurry into the transfer market over the summer resulted in a £175,000 purchase of Colin West. The investment made in West was small compared to that made in other members of the playing staff. Souness took advantage of the European competition ban imposed by UEFA on English clubs after the Heysel Stadium Disaster. Due to this, plus a sizeable transfer budget, he was able to attract the cream of English clubs' talent. The first of many international players arrived in the shape of Chris Woods, followed by the likes of England deputy captain Terry Butcher and former Manchester United defender Jimmy Nicholl.

The 1986–87 season was the first time in eight seasons that Rangers finished top of the Scottish Premier Division. However, the season began eventfully with player-manager Souness being sent-off in the first league match of the season. A foul on Hibernian's George McCluskey meant Souness had to watch the 2–1 defeat from the stands. But thirty-one wins, seven draws and five defeats later, Rangers were the champions. The league crown was not Souness' only trophy that season, however, for a 2–1 win over Celtic gave them a 1986 Scottish League Cup Final win.

That same season, goalkeeper Chris Woods set the then British football clean sheet record of 1,196 minutes: from 26 November 1986, when he conceded a goal in a UEFA Cup 1–1 draw with Borussia Mönchengladbach until fourteen games later, on 30 January 1987, when Adrian Sprott of Hamilton Academical knocked Rangers out of the Scottish Cup by a single goal.

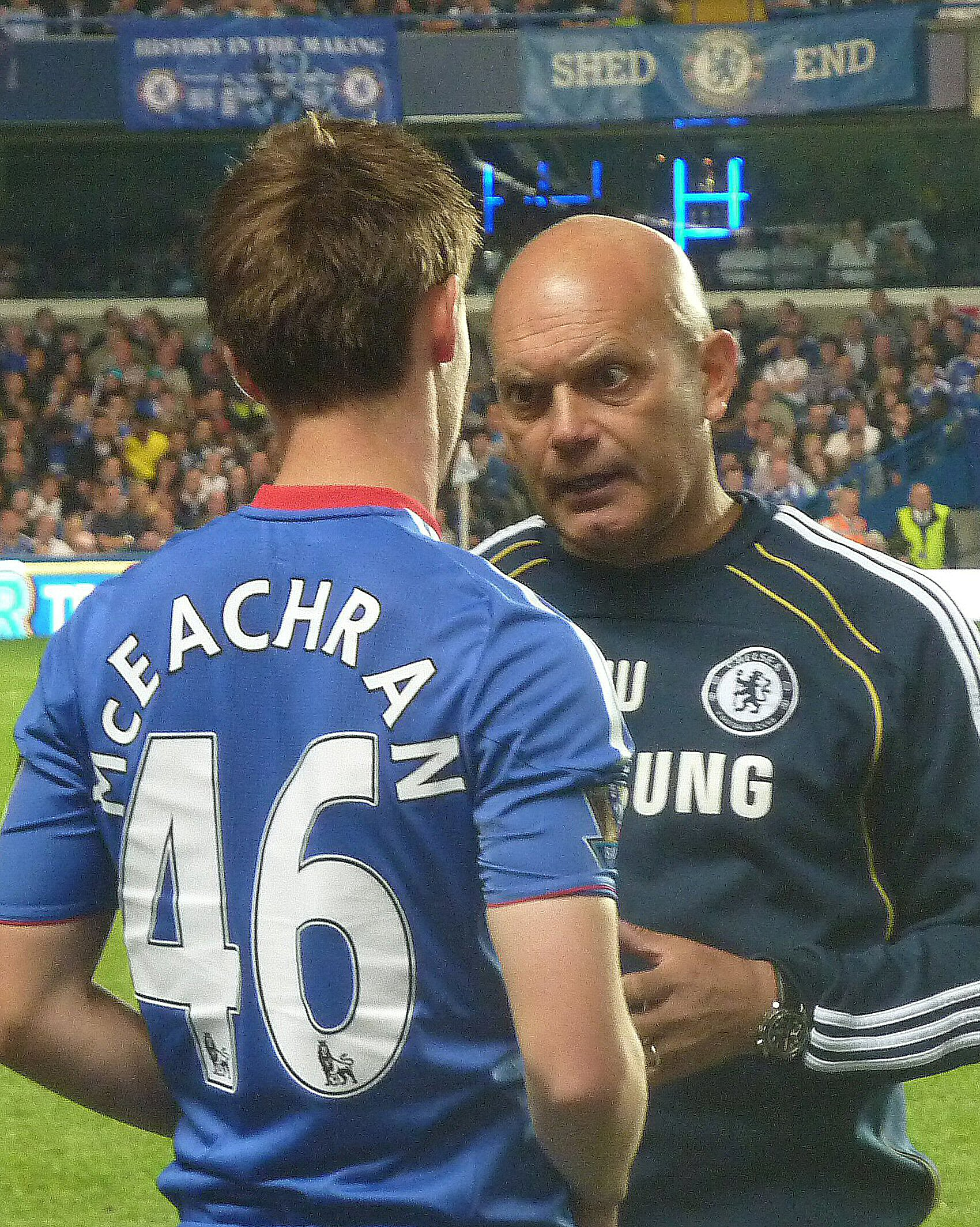
Ray Wilkins was part of an influx of English players under Graeme Souness. He spent two years at Ibrox

The following season, Rangers could not build on the success of the previous campaign, despite the arrivals of Trevor Francis, Ray Wilkins, Mark Walters, Mark Falco, John Brown and Richard Gough, who became Scotland's first £1 million player. The title defence began with three points from the first ten. That, added to injuries and suspensions, meant the club finished third, twelve points behind champions Celtic. There was League Cup Final victory over Aberdeen, however, and a run in the European Cup with Dynamo Kyiv and Górnik Zabrze as scalps. The Scottish Cup ended in the fourth round at the hands of Dunfermline Athletic.

The 1988–89 season was to start what would be one of the most successful spells in Rangers' history. When Souness' side regained the league championship by a margin of six points from second-placed Aberdeen, it became the first of nine. The club had again invested heavily in the playing staff, and again the club imported players from English sides, with Gary Stevens joining from Everton and Kevin Drinkell from Norwich City.

The team was unbeaten in all competitions in August and September, including a 5–1 victory over Celtic at Ibrox. Rangers collected fifty-six points from thirty-six games, twenty-six of which were victories. The League Cup was again at Ibrox as the side again beat Aberdeen. The final came just a fortnight after the sides met in the league. Rangers lost 2–1. During the game, Aberdeen's Neil Simpson's tackle on Rangers midfielder Ian Durrant left the latter with a knee injury that kept him out for over three years. But for a single-goal defeat by Celtic in the 1989 Scottish Cup Final, the treble would have rested at Ibrox that season.

The arrival of businessman David Murray in 1988 continued the Rangers resurgence. Murray had acquired Rangers for £6 million from the Nevada-based Lawrence Marlborough on 23 November 1988. Murray officially became chairman on 2 June 1989, replacing David Holmes.

Murray retained the ambitious strategy he had inherited from Holmes. This was demonstrated on 10 July 1989, when Rangers, acting on Souness' wishes, purchased former Celtic striker Mo Johnston from Nantes for £1.5 million. The fact that Rangers signed an ex-Celtic player would have been a big enough story, but Johnston was also a high-profile Roman Catholic. The transfer angered both sides of the Old Firm support. Rangers, seen as the Protestant club in Glasgow, had a policy of not employing Catholics. Celtic fans saw Johnston as a turncoat who had already committed to re-join Celtic from Nantes before Rangers made known their interest.

After three matches in the league, Rangers had no wins and two defeats. New arrival Johnston netted the crucial winner during an Old Firm game on 4 November 1989. Scoring the goal in the dying minutes of the match meant Johnston was all but forgiven by the Rangers support. Come May 1990, Rangers' name was on the trophy for the second time in as many seasons, but the club again failed to win the Scottish Cup, losing to Celtic in the fourth round. The side lost to Aberdeen by 2–1 in the Scottish League Cup Final.

The 1990–91 season would be Souness's last in charge. On 16 April 1991, he departed for his former club Liverpool before the league campaign reached its dramatic culmination, saying he had "gone as far as he would be allowed to go". A final-day victory over Aberdeen at Ibrox gave Rangers three championships in a row. Souness' assistant Walter Smith was in charge that day. Before his departure, Souness sold club captain Terry Butcher and spent big money on striker Mark Hateley, winger Pieter Huistra and forgotten man Oleg Kuznetsov. Souness was never to win a Scottish Cup with Rangers, as the team went down 2–0 to Celtic at Parkhead. The 1990 Scottish League Cup Final ended in victory, however.

== Smith's tenure (1991–1998) ==
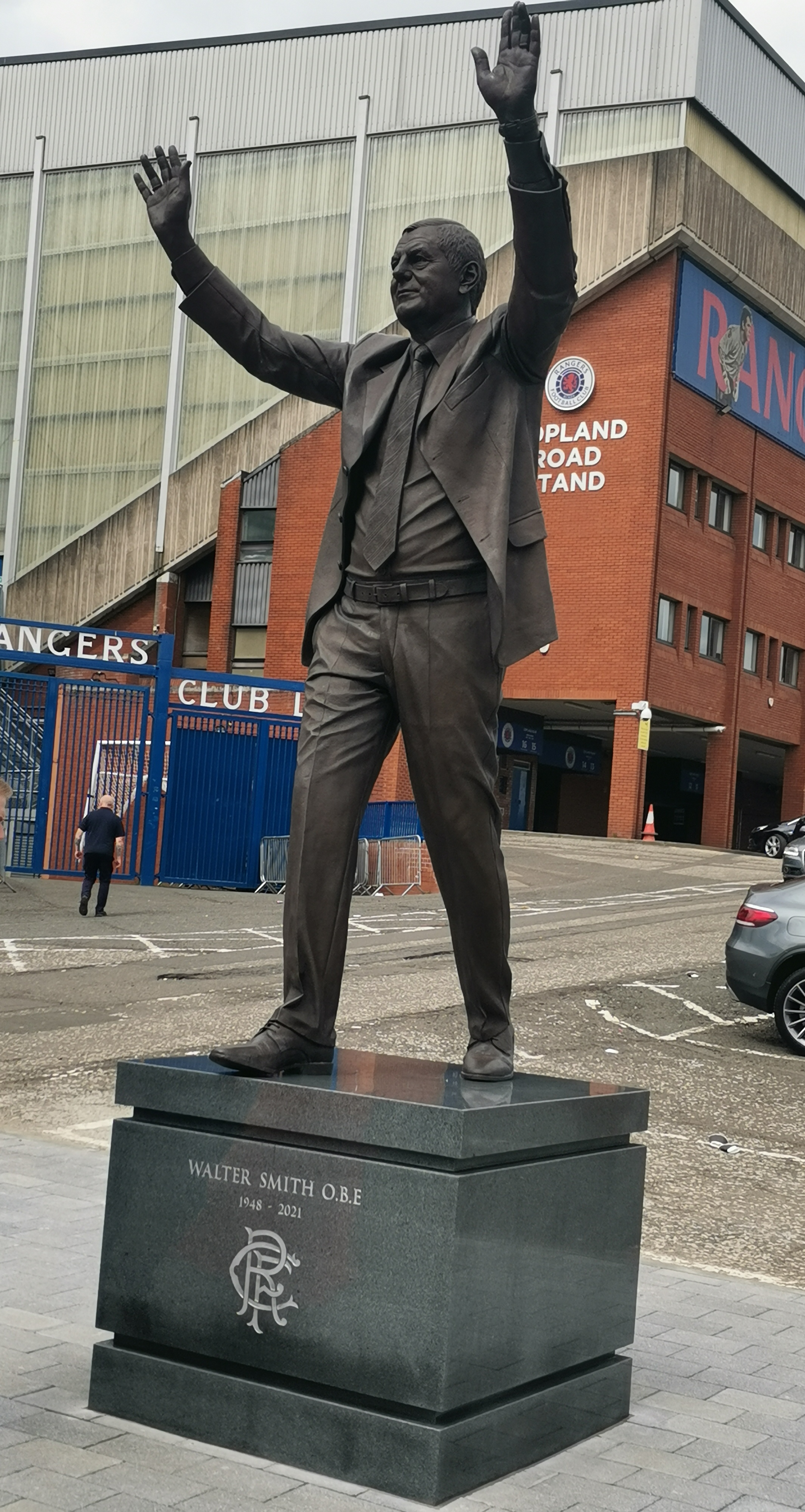
Walter Smith was Rangers manager in two spells, the first beginning in 1991

Walter Smith was appointed the ninth manager of Rangers on 19 April 1991, the eve of a crucial Scottish Premier Division match at St Mirren. Smith guided the side to a single-goal victory, and followed that with a similar result at home to Dundee United, before a 3–0 loss at Motherwell nearly derailed the side's championship hopes. The final league game of the season was at home to fellow title challengers Aberdeen, with a draw being all that was needed by the Dons to be crowned champions. A tense match ensued, but a Mark Hateley brace in front of a 37,652-strong Ibrox crowd gave Rangers the win and the league championship.

In his first full season in charge, Smith began to make changes. He brought in Archie Knox from Manchester United as his assistant, and also altered the playing personnel. Out went Trevor Steven for a fee of £5.58 million to Olympique Marseille. Amongst those who also left were Chris Woods, Mo Johnston and Mark Walters. With the financial backing of David Murray, Smith signed Andy Goram, Alexei Mikhailichenko, Stuart McCall, David Robertson, Dale Gordon and Paul Rideout.

A fourth-successive championship was secured that season, for the first time in over sixty years. Rangers topped the division with a total of seventy-two points, nine ahead of second-placed Hearts. The side scored 101 goals and were victorious in nineteen of their twenty-two away fixtures. The success continued into the Scottish Cup as Rangers won the 1992 final, beating Airdrieonians 2–1 to win the trophy for the first time in eleven years.

The 1992–93 season was arguably one of the most successful in the club's history, and the best European campaign since 1972. Not only did the team win the domestic treble but they also came to within one match of the 1993 UEFA Champions League final. Rangers saw off English First Division champions Leeds United in a tie dubbed the Battle of Britain. In the group stage, Rangers won two matches and drew four but, despite remaining undefeated, went out to Marseille, who were later found guilty of match fixing. No foul play was found with regards to the Rangers matches, however.

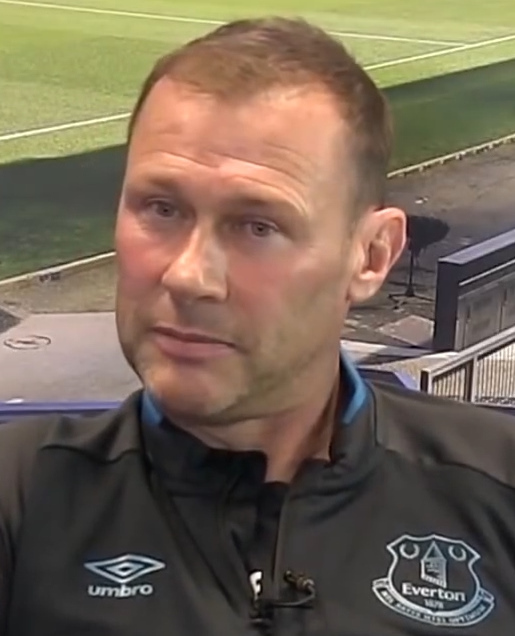
Duncan Ferguson became Britain's most expensive footballer when he joined Rangers in 1993

Duncan Ferguson became Britain's most expensive footballer upon his move to Rangers from Dundee United for £4 million in July 1993.

Rangers won the double the following season but missed out on a back-to-back domestic treble after losing in the 1994 Scottish Cup Final to Dundee United. It was a classic giant-killing act. United had had a fairly moderate season, winning eleven of their forty-four league matches. It was United's seventh appearance in a Scottish Cup Final, having lost all six of their previous encounters. A forty-seventh minute Craig Brewster goal gave Dundee United the win after a back pass by Dave McPherson was intercepted.

The 1994–95 season saw Rangers make two big-money signings, Basile Boli and Brian Laudrup, for £2.7 million and £2.4 million, respectively. A sixth-consecutive championship was won. The club sat top of the Scottish Premier Division on sixty-nine points, fifteen points ahead of second-placed Motherwell. Both runs in the domestic cup competitions ended before the last eight, as well as a failure to reach the UEFA Champions League group stage.

Rangers won the championship again in season 1995–96 with the help of Paul Gascoigne. The Englishman was signed on 10 July 1995 from Lazio. He made an instant impact at Rangers, running almost the length of the pitch to score in an Old Firm match at Celtic Park during the fifth league game of the season. Rangers went on to win the league, clinching the title in the penultimate game of the season against Aberdeen. After Rangers went 1–0 down in the early stages, Gascoigne went on to score a hat-trick to give the club a 3–1 victory and the championship. Joining the league crown in the Ibrox trophy cabinet was the 1996 Scottish Cup, which Rangers won after a 5–1 defeat of Hearts. A hat-trick from Gordon Durie and a Brian Laudrup double won Rangers their 27th Scottish Cup.

In season 1996–97, Rangers went on to win their ninth championship in a row, thereby equalling Celtic's achievement of the late 1960s and early 1970s. In the cup competitions, they were knocked out of the Scottish Cup at the quarter-finals stage, losing 2–0 to Celtic; however, the team won the League Cup, defeating Hearts 4–3. In Europe, the team qualified for the UEFA Champions League after a 10–3 aggregate win over Russian champions Alania Vladikavkaz. They recorded three points from their six group matches.

The season 1997–98 proved to be Walter Smith's last season as manager, and Rangers were unable to win a record tenth-straight league championship. The early-season form of new signing Marco Negri gave the team fresh impetus. The side finished the league on 72 points, two behind champions Celtic, after taking the title race to the last day of the season.

The club ended the season trophyless for the first time in twelve seasons as they lost the 1998 Scottish Cup Final to Hearts 2–1 and were knocked out League Cup in the quarter-finals by Dundee United. In Europe, the club failed to reach the Champions League group stages and they fell at the first hurdle in the UEFA Cup, losing both legs 2–1 to RC Strasbourg. Smith left Rangers and joined Premier League club Everton. Many players from the nine-in-a-row era left Rangers, including Brian Laudrup, Ally McCoist, Ian Durrant, Stuart McCall and club captain Richard Gough.

== The Little General (1998–2001) ==
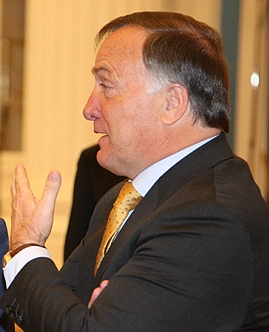
Dick Advocaat, tenth manager of Rangers

Dick Advocaat, nicknamed the Little General, succeeded Walter Smith on 1 June 1998. Formerly in charge of PSV Eindhoven, Advocaat became Rangers' tenth manager, and was the first non-Scot to hold the position. His appointment was viewed as reflecting a desire to begin to challenge Europe's elite clubs. David Murray had long proclaimed that Rangers ought to be judged not just in relation to success in Scotland but on their performance in European competition, and especially in the UEFA Champions League. Despite being given resources on a scale never before handed to a Rangers manager, success on a larger stage failed to materialise.

The scale of these resources made available to Advocaat initially confirmed that the Rangers management was thinking in bold, European terms. Confronted with a rump of players remaining after Smith's departure, Advocaat was furnished with an unprecedented transfer budget over the coming seasons. In total, Advocaat spent over £36 million on new players in his debut season. However, while Advocaat's record in transfer dealings remained mixed throughout his time at Ibrox, at first the club appeared to be beginning to deliver in playing terms, both in Scotland and (less predictably) Europe. Advocaat's first season saw another domestic treble secured. Performance in Europe was promising, with Bayer Leverkusen defeated in a solid, if unspectacular, UEFA Cup run.

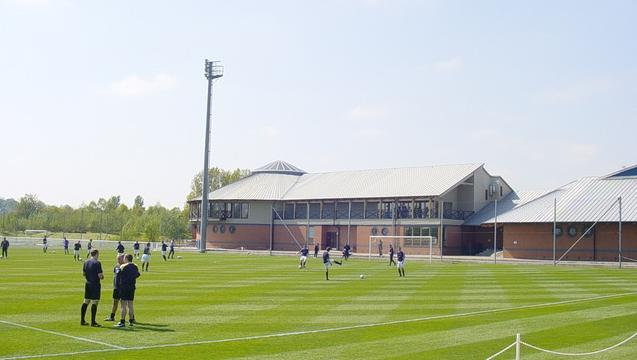
Murray Park

The following season, Advocaat continued to spend big, bringing the likes of Michael Mols and Claudio Reyna to Ibrox. A domestic double was secured in Advocaat's second season. In Europe, too, there were signs of greatly improved performance in the Champions League, as Parma were defeated en route to qualification for the group stages of the competition. During this season, Rangers Football Club Ltd traded on what was the Ofex market.

Rangers entered Advocaat's third season emboldened by the capture of five of the six domestic trophies available in his first two years; however, while the club again qualified for the Champions League group stage, performances in the league began rapidly to disintegrate. Further high-profile signings – Tore André Flo, for a club record £12 million, and the Dutch internationalist Ronald de Boer – could not reverse the decline. The club failed to win a major competition in the 2000–01 season, as Celtic swept the domestic board. Having continued in similar fashion in 2001–02, and with Martin O'Neill's Celtic side once more running away with the championship, Advocaat resigned as manager and took up a general-manager position, which he left just under a year later. Alex McLeish was appointed the new Rangers manager in December 2001.

Murray Park, a £14m training complex, was constructed at Auchenhowie. Its existence was viewed as essential if the club was to compete with its European peers in nurturing home-grown talent and developing players.

== Financial constraints under McLeish (2001–2006) ==
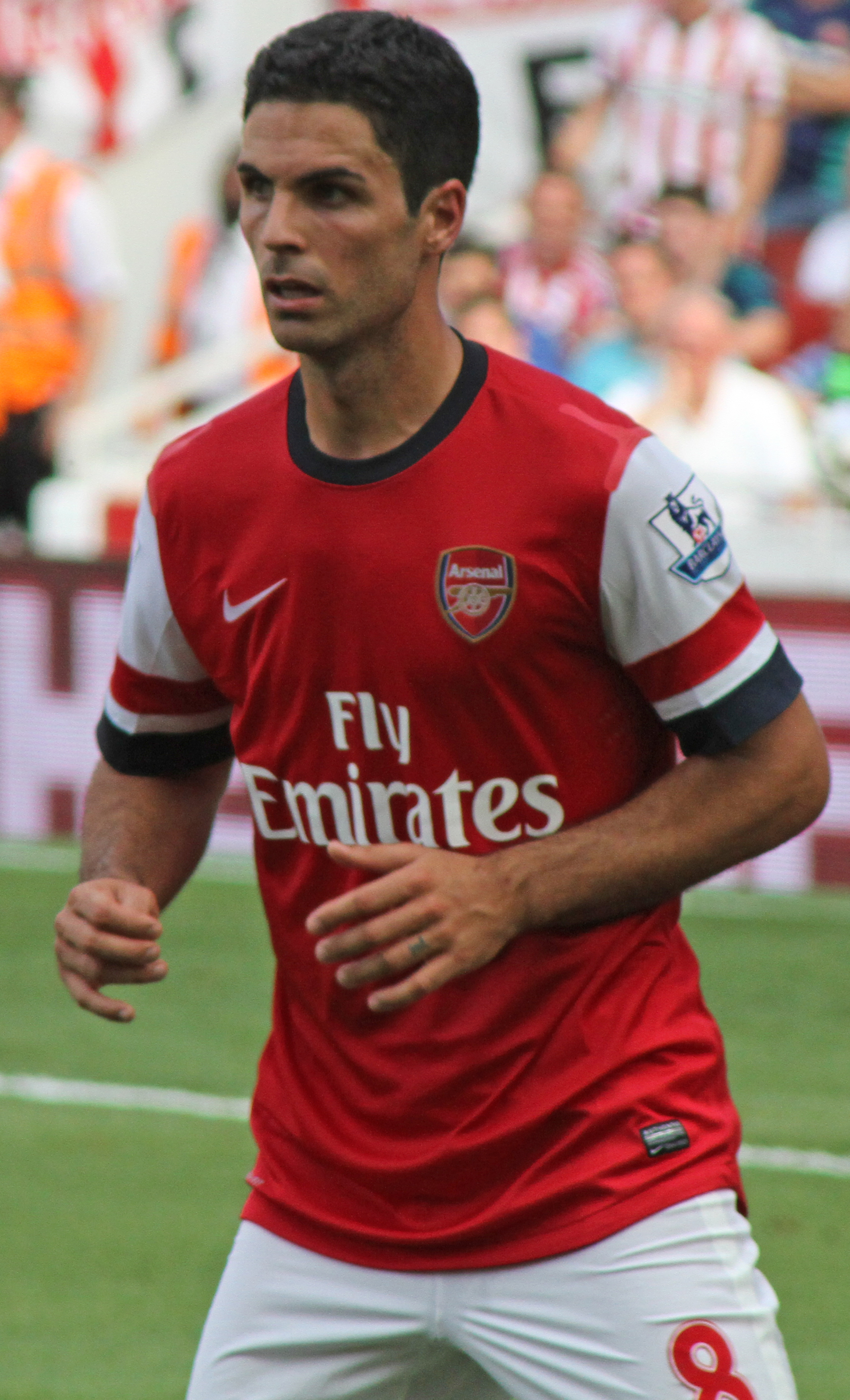
Future manager of Arsenal, Spaniard Mikel Arteta spent two seasons in Glasgow, winning both the league championship and League Cup in 2002–03

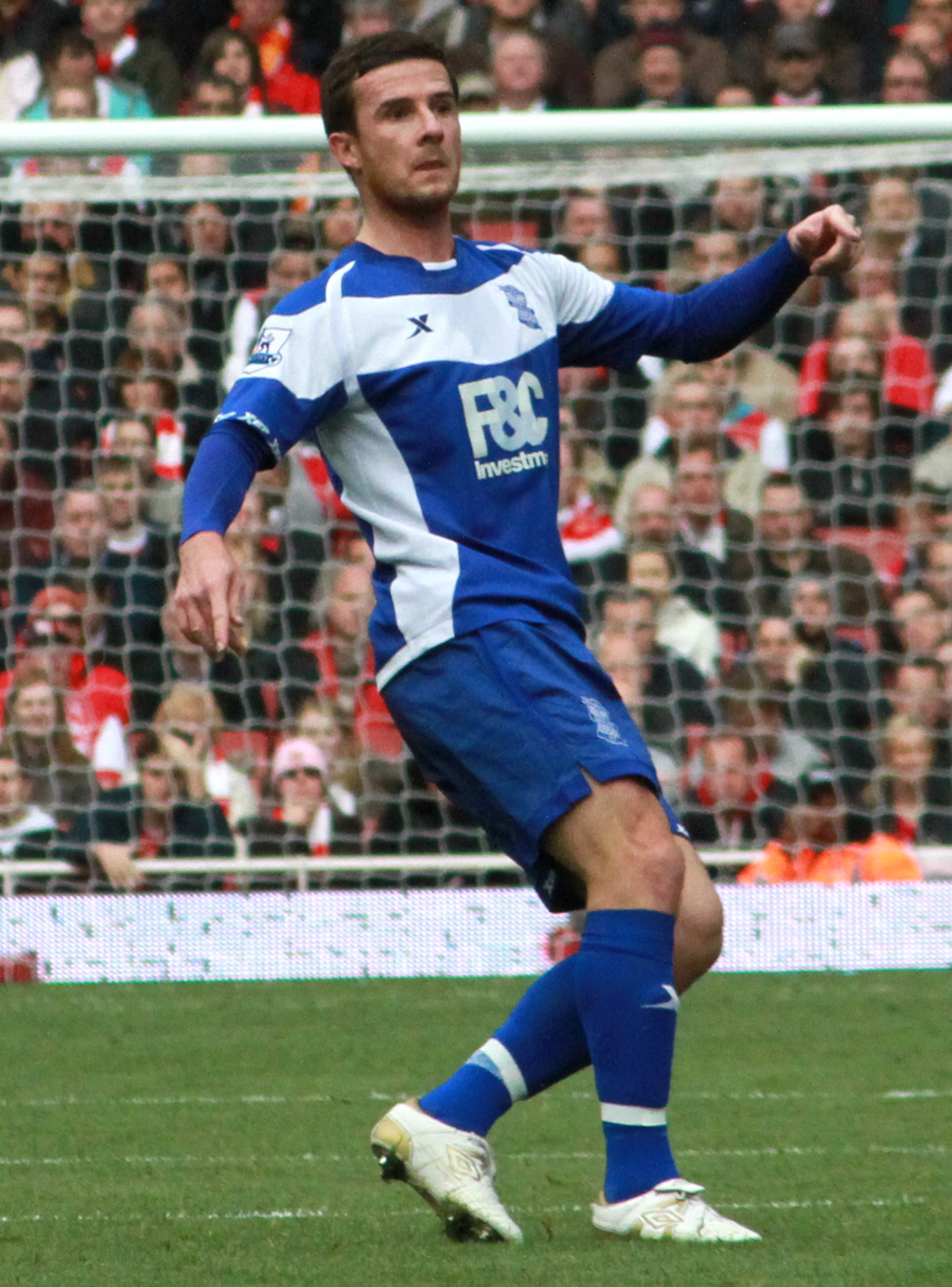
Scotland and Rangers captain Barry Ferguson. The midfielder had two spells at Ibrox, making over 300 appearances for the club

McLeish, Rangers' eleventh manager, appointed Andy Watson as his assistant. Others said to be included on the shortlist of prospective managers were the then Ipswich Town manager George Burley, former Germany coach Berti Vogts and ex-Arsenal manager George Graham.

A Scottish Cup and League Cup double in McLeish's first half-season, 2001–02, including a dramatic 3–2 defeat of Celtic in the 2002 Scottish Cup Final, orchestrated by Barry Ferguson and marked by a dramatic Peter Løvenkrands last-minute winner.

In McLeish's first full season as manager, 2002–03, the club won its seventh domestic treble. The Scottish Premier League title was secured after a tense run-in. Going into the final round, both sides were equal on 94 points, but Rangers had a one-goal advantage and sat top of the league. On a dramatic last day, a 6–1 victory over Dunfermline Athletic denied Celtic the title on goal-difference after the Parkhead club beat Kilmarnock 4–0. The destination of the title was unknown until the final seconds of this match, with both teams level on points and goal-difference. Only a last-minute penalty by Mikel Arteta clinched the league title for Rangers.

A victory over Celtic in the 2003 Scottish League Cup Final, in March, provided the first piece of the club's seventh treble. A 1–0 victory over Dundee in the 2003 Scottish Cup Final, the following May, saw a triumphant finalé to the season. It was a near-flawless start to McLeish's reign, ruined only by a poor showing in Europe, which Rangers exited in the first round to minnows Viktoria Žižkov.

The following season, McLeish's initial period as manager proved difficult to sustain. The club's perilous financial position in the wake of the profligacy of the Advocaat era, meant a period of relative austerity. The wage bill had to be slashed as the club embarked on an extensive cost-cutting programme in an attempt to stabilise a mushrooming and unsustainable level of debt. Confronted with a squad of well-paid but ageing players, McLeish was compelled to rebuild without the luxury of the generous transfer fund enjoyed by some of his predecessors. McLeish was to lose, from his treble-winning squad, defender Lorenzo Amoruso, Scottish international winger Neil McCann and club captain midfielder Barry Ferguson. In their place, McLeish was required to rebuild with only the use of Bosman free transfers and loan signings.

After a good start to the 2003–04 season, which saw the side top of the league and qualify for UEFA Champions League (thanks to a dramatic late goal in Denmark against Copenhagen), a dramatic downturn in results ultimately resulted in a trophyless campaign. McLeish's signings of experienced players, such as the Brazilian midfielder Emerson, Norway forward Egil Østenstad and the £600,000 signing of Portuguese winger Nuno Capucho proved costly in more ways than one.

The 2004–05 season started in the same vein, with McLeish making another questionable signing in Serbian midfielder Dragan Mladenovic for £1 million. The Serb played fewer than ten games for the club. On the pitch, the team again fell behind Celtic in the league and exited the Champions League at the qualifying stage. It was rumoured that failure to gain entry into the new UEFA Cup group stage would see McLeish lose his job, but another late goal and a penalty shootout win over Marítimo of Portugal provided him with a stay of execution. After this, his fortunes began to turn again. New arrivals included Nacho Novo, plus the Bosmans Dado Pršo, Jean-Alain Boumsong and midfielder Alex Rae. Once these players settled in, the team began to recover ground lost to O'Neill's ageing Celtic side. Boumsong, in particular, was a marked success, but he was sold in January 2005, after only six months at the club, to then Premier League side Newcastle United (managed by former Gers boss Graeme Souness) for £8 million. This cash paved the way for more signings, including Thomas Buffel, Sotirios Kyrgiakos and the return of Barry Ferguson.

The 2005 Scottish League Cup Final, in March 2005, ended in a 5–1 victory over Motherwell; the league, however, appeared to have been lost. Despite catching and overtaking Celtic (with two Old Firm wins, including a pivotal 2–0 victory at Celtic Park in what was McLeish's first win there as Rangers manager), a loss to their city rivals, in the last derby of the season at Ibrox, handed Celtic a five-point lead with only four games remaining, and seemed to end hopes of the title. Rangers kept its winnings way, however, and Celtic's 3–1 home defeat to Hibernian meant only two points separated the sides going into the final game of the season. Rangers needed to win at Hibernian and hope that Celtic would drop points at Fir Park. In perhaps even more dramatic circumstances than two years previously, Motherwell overcame a 1–0 deficit, with two goals in injury time from Scott McDonald, to defeat the Parkhead side, while Rangers edged out a tight single-goal victory at Easter Road. The helicopter that was carrying the league trophy was on its way to Motherwell, so it had to turn around and fly to Edinburgh. That day has passed into Ibrox folklore, becoming known as Helicopter Sunday. McLeish could celebrate his second, and Rangers' 51st, league title.

The 2005–06 season saw Rangers win six league games out of the first 17, being knocked out of the League Cup by Celtic in the process. The period from October through to early December saw the team embark on, statistically, the worst run in their history, going ten games without a win. During this time, however, the club became the first Scottish side to qualify for the knockout stages of the Champions League, yet there was still significant pressure on McLeish from fans due to the club's poor position in the domestic league table.

After a period of uncertainty around the manager's future, David Murray stated that McLeish would remain in charge indefinitely, but did concede that domestic results would need to improve. After this announcement, the team's results did improve, helped by the signing from Kilmarnock of Kris Boyd. The side strung together a ten-match unbeaten run, but, entering the crucial month of February, which was to feature a must-win Old Firm match and the resumption of European football, this evaporated. Rangers lost 3–0 at home to Hibernian on 4 February to exit the Scottish Cup and end their last realistic hopes of silverware that season. Protests against McLeish and the chairman followed the game. After signs that supporter unrest was turning on Murray, on 9 February 2006, two days before the crucial Old Firm match, it was announced that McLeish would leave his position as manager at the end of the 2005–06 season. On 11 March, it was confirmed that former Lyon manager Paul Le Guen would succeed McLeish.

== Paul Le Guen (2006–2007) ==
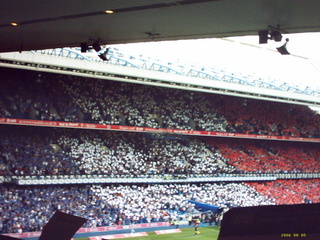
Card display at Ibrox to welcome new manager Paul Le Guen

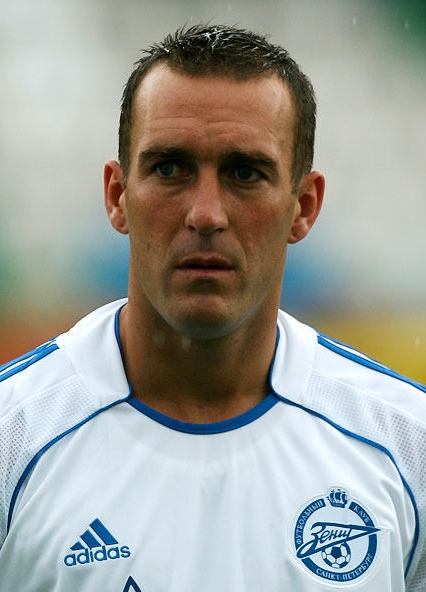
Fernando Ricksen was one of several players who fell out with Le Guen. He died from motor neurone disease in 2019, aged 43

Murray predicted a fruitful reign under Le Guen, describing his capture as "a massive moonbeam of success" for the club and promising the club had "got big plans". He announced that the Frenchman would be given significant funds with which to strengthen the squad, with Rangers having announced an arrangement with sports retailer JJB Sports.

Le Guen was well known for unearthing and nurturing young talent, and he made an immediate splash in the transfer market. In the summer of 2006, he made eleven signings (of those, however, only Saša Papac stayed beyond their first season). Le Guen spent big money on Filip Šebo, but the Slovak only netted twice during the campaign. Other signings including Karl Svensson, Libor Sionko and Lionel Letizi, while Jérémy Clément was to be in Glasgow for only six months.

Young South African player Dean Furman was signed from Chelsea, and French youngsters William Stanger and Antoine Ponroy from Rennes. Le Guen allowed more experienced players to leave, including Alex Rae, Sotirios Kyrgiakos, Peter Løvenkrands and Ronald Waterreus.

Rangers' first match under Le Guen was a friendly against Irish Premier League champions Linfield on 6 July 2006 at Windsor Park, Belfast. The visitors won 2–0, with first-half goals from Kris Boyd and Thomas Buffel. The squad then flew out to South Africa on 9 July for a training camp where they were to also play three matches. Defender Fernando Ricksen did not take any part in the tour, due to what was described by the club as "unacceptable behaviour" on the flight to Johannesburg. He returned to Scotland and was subsequently loaned to Zenit St Petersburg on 9 August. Ricksen never played for the club again as his loan spell in Russia was made permanent.

The Scottish Premier League season opened on 30 July, with Le Guen taking his Rangers side to Fir Park, where they defeated Motherwell 2–1. In Le Guen's first competitive game at Ibrox, Rangers were held to a 2–2 draw by Dundee United, and were forced to come back from two goals down. On 11 August, Rangers signed Manchester United's 19-year-old winger Lee Martin on loan for the season. They also recruited the services of Austrian Vienna defender Saša Papac, while Marvin Andrews, Olivier Bernard, Bob Malcolm and José-Karl Pierre-Fanfan all departed.

With the transfer window closed and five league matches played, Rangers had collected nine points from fifteen. The next two months showed little improvement as the side had sporadic wins, and they lost the first Old Firm match of the season 2–0. From the seven matches played in September and October 2006, the team won three and gathered ten points from the twenty-one available.

By mid-November, Rangers found themselves in third place, fifteen points behind leaders Celtic. The odd win was mixed with regular dropped points as the team struggled to find consistency in the early part of the season. The club was knocked out of the League Cup by then-First Division side St Johnstone. The 2–0 defeat at Ibrox on 8 November led to widespread calls for Le Guen to leave.

Following the League Cup defeat, there was a slight gain in form as the side claimed sixteen points from twenty-one, including a 1–1 Old Firm draw, thanks to a last-minute Brahim Hemdani equaliser. Rangers also became the first Scottish club to qualify from the UEFA Cup group stage in December 2006, after wins over Livorno, Maccabi Haifa and Partizan Belgrade. Domestic results and performances, however, continued to be inconsistent and in January 2007, Le Guen controversially stripped midfielder Barry Ferguson of the captaincy.

On 4 January 2007, Le Guen left Rangers by mutual consent. This made him the club's shortest-serving manager, and the only one to leave the club without completing a full season in charge. Later that year, sports journalist Graham Spiers published a book which speculated Le Guen left the club because he was being "undermined" by other Rangers personnel. Those named were Ferguson and the then club doctor Ian McGuinness.

== Smith's return (2007–2011) ==
Following the departure of Paul Le Guen, a number of media sources reported an "understanding" that the new management structure would consist of former Rangers duo Walter Smith and Ally McCoist, and the SFA confirmed that Rangers enquired about the availability of the pair; however, on 8 January, the SFA rebuffed Rangers' approach for Smith.

On 10 January 2007, it was announced that Smith was the new manager of Rangers, with McCoist confirmed as assistant manager and Kenny McDowall as first-team coach. Smith and his team undertook some serious changes to the side. They signed experienced defenders David Weir, Ugo Ehiogu and Andy Webster to shore-up the back line.

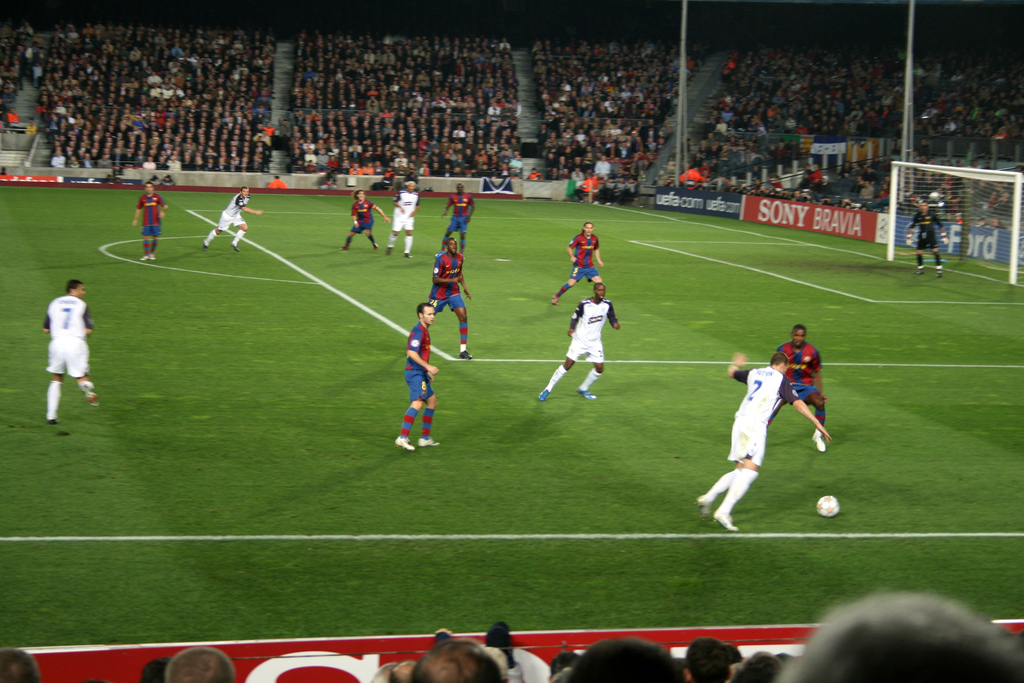
Alan Hutton takes on Barcelona left back Eric Abidal during the match at the Camp Nou.

The following summer, Smith made ten signings, including defender Carlos Cuéllar and midfielder Lee McCulloch. The early-season priority, qualification for the Champions League group stage, was secured after aggregate victories over the champions of the Montenegrin and Serbian leagues FK Zeta and Red Star Belgrade, respectively. Rangers were drawn in Group E, to play Barcelona, French champions Lyon and German champions Stuttgart. The campaign started well for Rangers with two victories, 2–1 at home to Stuttgart and 3–0 against Lyon at the Stade Gerland, as well as a goalless draw against Barcelona at Ibrox. They lost matchday six against Lyon 3–0, which ended their 2007–08 UEFA Champions League run. The adventure continued as they progressed to the final of the UEFA Cup, defeating Panathinaikos, Werder Bremen, Sporting CP and Fiorentina along the way. They beat Fiorentina on penalties to set up a final, in Manchester, against Zenit St. Petersburg, who were managed by former Gers manager Dick Advocaat. The team lost that match 2–0, amid serious disturbances caused by small sections of the 100,000-strong Rangers support. Video evidence was released by the Greater Manchester Police of suspected Rangers fans attacking officers in Manchester city centre following the defeat. An appeal was launched on BBC's Crimewatch programme in January 2009 in an attempt to trace 49 men in connection with the riots.

On the domestic front, the race for the Scottish Premier League continued until the final matchday of the season. Both Celtic and Rangers were tied on 86 points going into their games (against Dundee United and Aberdeen, respectively) on 22 May 2008, but Celtic were top of the table due to having a better goal-difference of 57, four more than Rangers. This did not prove to be decisive, however, as Rangers surrendered their hopes of landing the championship with a 2–0 defeat at Pittodrie. The club had held a ten-point lead in late March.

On 16 March 2008, Rangers appeared in their first final since 2005. They played Dundee United in the League Cup Final, and won on penalties. The match was tied 2–2 after extra time, with both goals coming from Kris Boyd, who also scored the winning spot kick. They also reached the 2009 Scottish Cup Final, the club's 50th such appearance. The side had beaten St Johnstone 4–3 on penalties in the semi-final after the score was tied at 1–1 after extra time. The final was against Queen of the South and was played on 24 May 2008, two days after the decisive Old Firm fixture that had ended in Celtic's favour. Rangers won the final 3–2, thanks to goals from DaMarcus Beasley and a double from Kris Boyd.

The 2008–09 season began with an exit from the UEFA Champions League and European football altogether, losing 2–1 on aggregate to Kaunas in the second qualifying round. The first leg at Ibrox finished goalless, but the return leg in Lithuania ended in defeat for Rangers after an 87th-minute header from Linas Pilibaitis. The financial consequences of the failures to qualify for the Champions League were revealed when the club posted a loss of £3.9 million for the six months to December 2008, and in March decided to offer staff the option of voluntary redundancy as a way of cutting costs. Player departures included Chris Burke, Jean-Claude Darcheville and a couple out-on-loan deals, but the increased debt meant that the club needed to find a cash injection. This resulted in the attempted sale of Kris Boyd to Birmingham City, which fell through due to the player's wage demands.

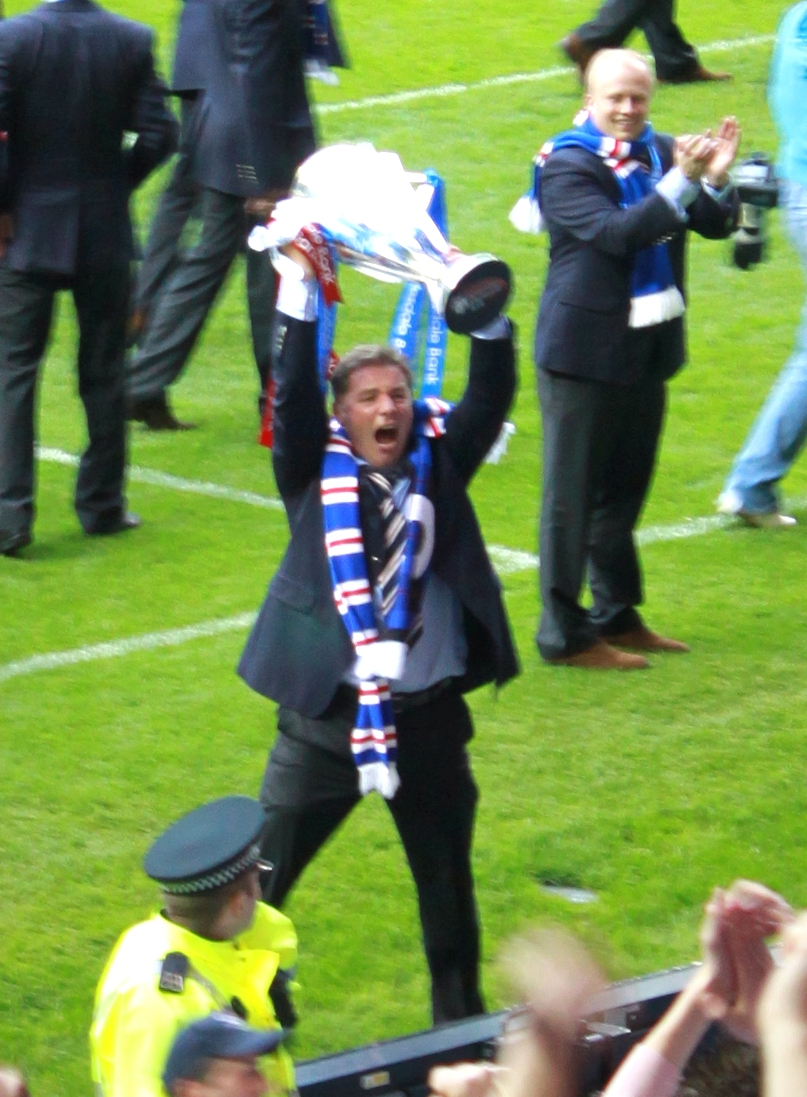
Ally McCoist celebrating with the SPL trophy in 2009

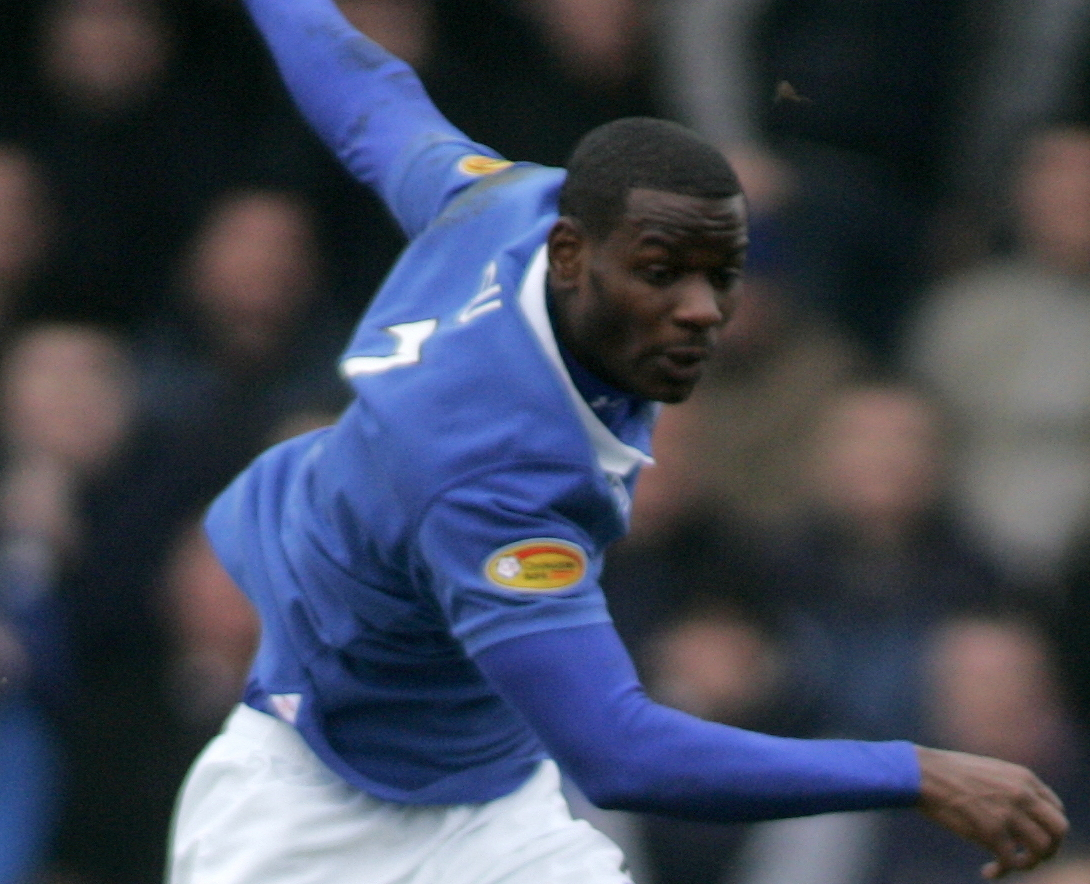
Maurice Edu, in injury time, scored the only goal of the game in Rangers' Old Firm victory over Celtic in February 2010 which effectively secured the title for the Ibrox side

In the first Old Firm game of the season, Rangers won 4–2, with Pedro Mendes scoring his first goal for the club and Kenny Miller scoring a double against his former employers. However, the team's league form stuttered thereafter. Despite a run of five wins from six matches following the Old Firm victory, the side trailed Celtic by seven points in the league at the turn of the year. For the first few months of 2009, both sides dropped and gained points on the other, and Rangers briefly took over top spot of the Premier League on 21 February after a win against Kilmarnock. The spell as league leaders lasted less than a fortnight. A defeat and a draw, both at home, to Inverness and Hearts, respectively, saw Walter Smith's side sit second in the table, one point behind Celtic, at the split. The fourth Old Firm league meeting of the season finished with a single-goal victory to Rangers, a Steven Davis strike. This meant that, with three league games remaining, Rangers were two points ahead of their arch-rivals. Further twists and turns followed; both Old Firm sides drew their matches against Hibernian at Easter Road, leaving Rangers two points clear with one round of matches remaining. Rangers needed a win against Dundee United to guarantee the club's 52nd league title. Goals from Kyle Lafferty, Pedro Mendes and Kris Boyd sealed a 3–0 win and the club's first league championship in four seasons.

The club played in the finals of both of the domestic cup competitions for the second season running. The 2009 Scottish League Cup Final was reached by defeating Partick Thistle, Hamilton and Falkirk en route, but the final ended in a 2–0 defeat at the hands of Celtic after extra time. The match was Walter Smith's first-ever Old Firm final and was marred by a Kirk Broadfoot sending off deep into extra time for a foul on Aiden McGeady inside the penalty box. Celtic were subsequently awarded a penalty, which McGeady himself converted. Rangers qualified for the 2009 Scottish Cup Final after beating St Mirren 3–0 in the semi-final. The second goal of the game was scored by Kris Boyd, his 100th goal for Rangers. The team faced Falkirk at Hampden Park on 30 May 2009 in what was the club's 51st Scottish Cup Final appearance. A Nacho Novo strike in the first minute of the second half gave Rangers a 1–0 win and completed their domestic double.

The following season saw Rangers' financial problems continue. A quiet summer in terms of transfer arrivals contrasted to the outgoings. The club removed eleven players who had made first-team appearances from the wage bill on permanent and loan deals. The only addition to the playing staff was Jérôme Rothen on a season-long loan. Rothen was the first player to sign for the club in over a year. On 26 August, chairman David Murray stepped down and was replaced by non-executive director Alastair Johnston. Johnston stated that one of his main priorities was to find a buyer for owner Murray's shares. On 24 October, Rangers manager Walter Smith was reported to say that Lloyds Banking Group, who the club was in debt to, was "effectively running the club". On 12 November, the extent of the club's financial problems was shown to be a debt of £31 million, a rise of £10m from the previous year.

On the field, Rangers' Scottish Premier League title defence got off to a stuttering start: three wins in the league was followed by three draws, the first Old Firm victory of the season was followed by dropped points at home to Hibernian. The side lost their first league match of the season away to Aberdeen on 28 November but then embarked on a six-match winning run, scoring 26 goals in the process. At the start of 2010, Rangers sat at the top of the league. The second Old Firm fixture finished in a 1–1 draw. Rangers had a ten-point lead by mid-February. They won the third Old Firm match 1–0, thanks to an injury-time winner from Maurice Edu, which all but secured the title. The side had to wait nearly two months to be confirmed as champions due to dropping points to St Johnstone and Dundee United. On 25 April, Rangers won their 53rd league title after defeating Hibernian 1–0 at Easter Road.

In the domestic cup competitions, Rangers won the League Cup after a 1–0 victory over St Mirren in the final, despite being reduced to nine men, with Danny Wilson and Kevin Thomson being sent off. However, they were unable to retain the Scottish Cup after losing 1–0 to eventual winners Dundee United in a quarter-final replay.

Rangers were seeded in pot two of the UEFA Champions League group stage for the first time. The club was drawn against Sevilla, Stuttgart and Unirea Urziceni. A 1–1 draw in Stuttgart was followed by two consecutive 4–1 defeats at home to Sevilla and Unirea, the latter being regarded as one of the club's worst-ever European results. Rangers were left with a small chance of qualifying from the group after a 1–1 draw in the return leg with Unirea, a match that saw trouble in the Rangers fans section of the stadium. The club was charged by UEFA for inappropriate conduct, and following an investigation was fined €20,000 and ordered to pay the cost of repairing the damage to the stadium infrastructure caused by their supporters. The side finished bottom of their group and was knocked out of European football altogether after two defeats in the final two matches.

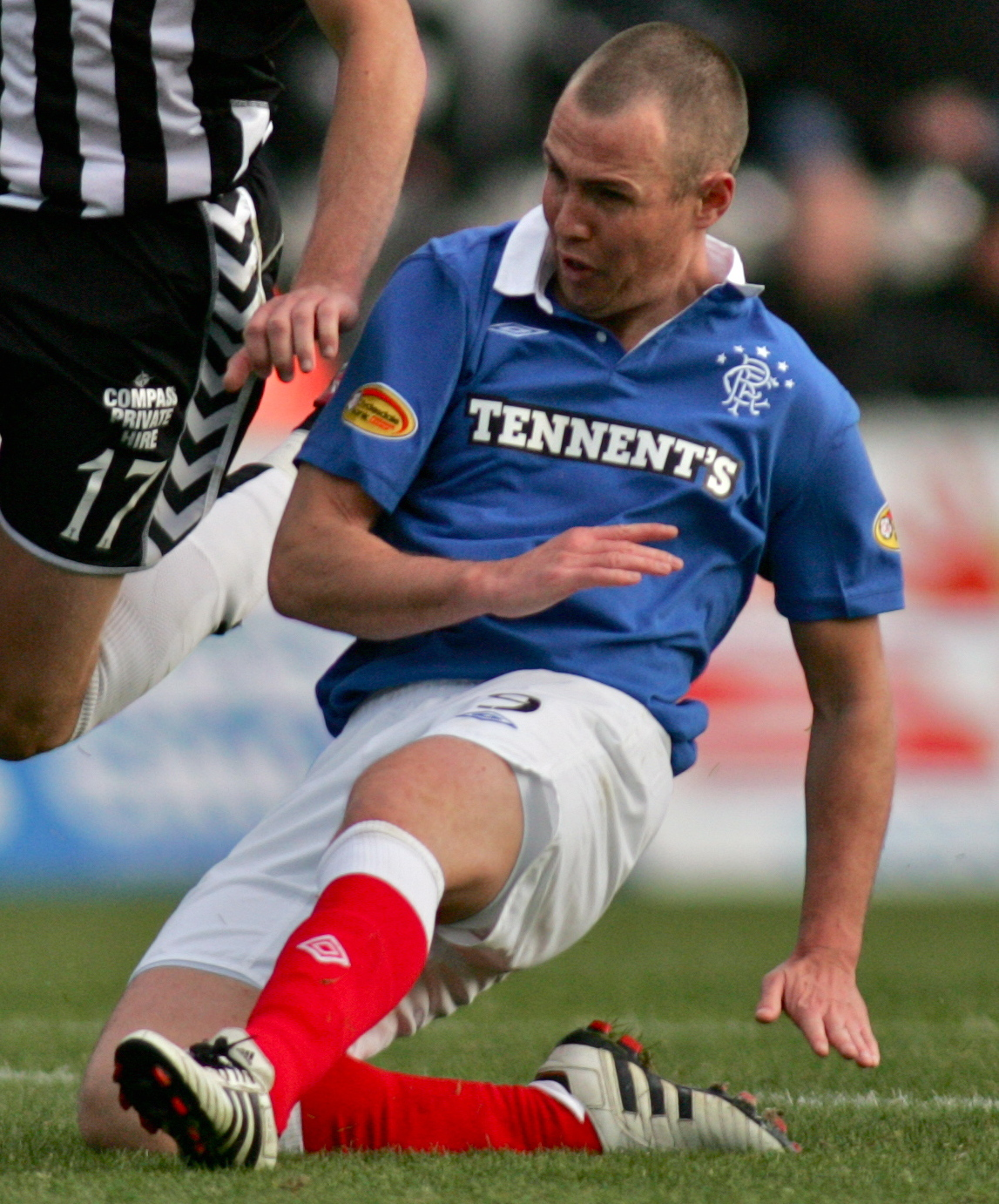
Striker Kenny Miller had three spells at Rangers between 2000 and 2018, scoring over 100 goals for the club

With financial problems at the club ongoing, the summer of 2010 began for Rangers with several players leaving the club. With a limited transfer budget and a small squad, Smith had to decide whether to increase the number of playing staff or improve the starting eleven; he opted to sign Nikica Jelavić.

Both sides of the Old Firm began the season with eight consecutive league wins. When they met on matchday nine, Rangers claimed a 3–1 victory over Celtic and took early control of the league. A 1–1 draw at home to Inverness the following weekend ended Rangers' 100% start to the season, and a home defeat by Hibernian inflicted the team's first league point-less match of the season, the first of five. The cold spell in the winter of 2010–11 saw many postponements, and for long spells Rangers were behind Celtic, albeit with games in hand. In the third league meeting between the Old Firm, Celtic came out on top and led the table for the first time that season; however, Celtic's advantage was short-lived, after a loss to Motherwell the following week allowed Rangers to regain top spot. A 3–2 loss to Dundee United at Ibrox, followed by a goalless draw in the final Old Firm fixture, left the title in Celtic's hands with four matches remaining. There was to be a final twist in the league season, however. On 3 May, Celtic lost a rearranged match away to Inverness, and with three matches remaining, Rangers had a one-point lead. Smith's side went on to win all three fixtures, scoring eleven goals, and claimed the club's 54th league championship.

In the domestic cup competitions, Rangers won the League Cup after beating Celtic 2–1 after extra time. They lost 1–0 to Celtic in the fifth-round replay in Scottish Cup, however. The match was marked by several incidents: three Rangers players were sent off and Celtic manager Neil Lennon and Ally McCoist were involved in a pitch-side altercation at the final whistle.

In Europe, Rangers automatically qualified for the UEFA Champions League group stages for the second season in a row. They drew Manchester United, Valencia and Bursaspor. Rangers were unbeaten in their first three group stage games, with a 0–0 draw at Old Trafford (the only team to keep a clean sheet at the Theatre of Dreams in the entire 2010–11 season), a 1–0 victory over Bursaspor at Ibrox and a 1–1 draw at home to Valencia. A 3–0 defeat in Valencia, followed by a 1–0 loss at home to Manchester United, ended Rangers' chances of qualifying for the last sixteen, but third place and a spot in the UEFA Europa League was already secured after Bursaspor failed to pick up a point in five games. In the last group match, Rangers drew 1–1 in Turkey, giving Bursaspor their first Champions League point. As a consolation, Rangers made it to the last sixteen of the Europa League, beating Sporting CP on away goals in the last 32, but lost to PSV Eindhoven on aggregate.

On 6 May 2011, it was confirmed that David Murray had sold his controlling interest in the club (85.3%) for £1 to Wavetower Limited, a company owned by businessman Craig Whyte.

== McCoist's tenure, liquidation and relaunch (2011–2015) ==
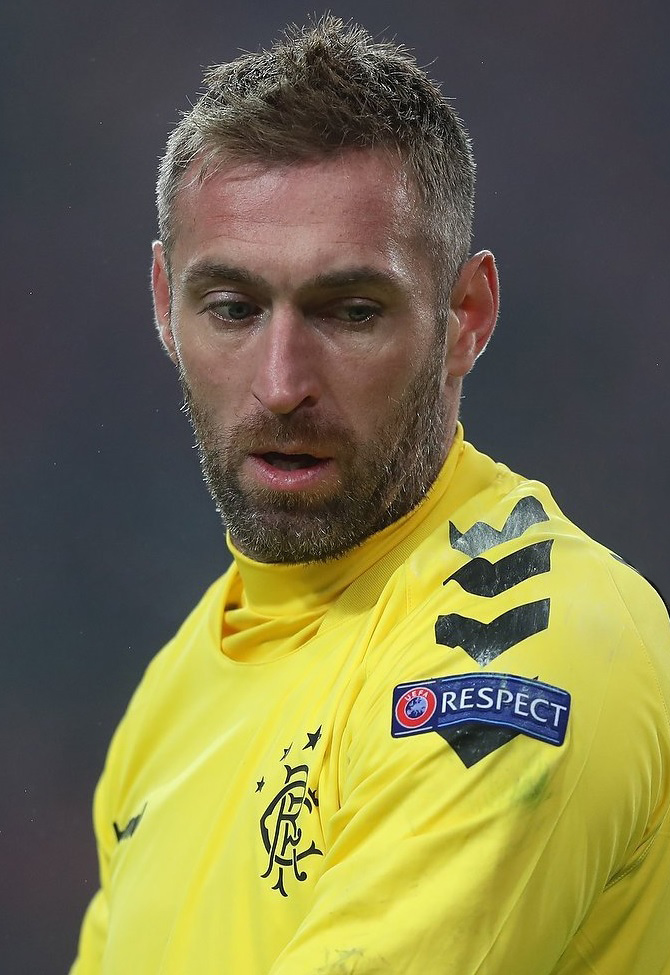
Allan McGregor signed a new six-year contract with Rangers in July 2011. As of 2023, he has played over 500 games for the club

Smith's deputy and Rangers record goalscorer Ally McCoist was appointed manager of the club for the 2011–12 season. Hampered by a bizarre transfer policy under Whyte, Rangers found themselves knocked out of first the UEFA Champions League and then the UEFA Europa League by the end of August, depriving the club of income that may have been anticipated. With the new ownership, there initially appeared to be some financial stability of the club. A number of first-team regulars were secured on long-term contract extensions, including Steven Davis, Allan McGregor, Steven Whittaker and Gregg Wylde. When McCoist entered the transfer market, his first signing being Almería midfielder Juan Manuel Ortiz, he soon encountered difficulties. A number of highly publicised failed transfers, including deals for Wesley Verhoek and Roland Juhász, led to many doubting Craig Whyte's financial prowess.

Rangers' first Scottish Premier League match of the season was a home match, against Jim Jefferies' Hearts, before which the league flag was unfurled by then-chairman Whyte. The following week, McCoist claimed his first competitive victory as manager with a win over his first club, St Johnstone. The season proved to be a baptism of fire for McCoist; by early October, the club held a ten-point lead over Celtic, and on 5 November the lead stood at fifteen points, and twelve over second-placed Motherwell. A draw with St Johnstone and subsequent defeats to Kilmarnock, St Mirren and Celtic, who then went on a run of twenty-one matches undefeated, saw Rangers slip to second place, where the club remained for the rest of the season.

Rangers' European adventure began in the final week of July. They were defeated at home by underdogs Malmö 1-0 and crashed out of the Champions League with a 1–1 draw in Sweden in which both Steven Whittaker and Madjid Bougherra were both sent off. In the Europa League play-off round, they were knocked out by NK Maribor. In cup competitions, the club fared no better, with a third-round defeat by First Division side Falkirk in the League Cup and a fifth-round exit at home to Dundee United.

On 13 February 2012, Rangers filed legal papers at the Court of Session, giving notice of their intention to appoint administrators. They officially entered administration the following day, and appointed London-based financial advisers Duff & Phelps as administrators. They had entered administration over an alleged non-payment of £9 million in PAYE and VAT taxes to HM Revenue and Customs. On entering administration, the team was docked ten points by the SPL, a move regarded as "effectively ending" its 2012 championship challenge. A failure then to submit accounts for 2011 meant the club was not granted a licence to play in European football in season 2012–13. In April, it was reported that the club's total debts could be as high as £134m.

On 13 May, it was reported that Whyte had sold his controlling interest in The Rangers Football Club Plc for £2 to a consortium led by Charles Green. Green offered the creditors a settlement, in the form of a company voluntary arrangement (CVA), in an attempt to exit administration. On 12 June, it emerged that HMRC would reject the CVA put forward by Green. Green's takeover of the club depended on the CVA being accepted by HMRC, which would have seen £8.5m of the total debt repaid. The formal rejection of the CVA, two days later, meant that The Rangers Football Club plc entered the liquidation process. The company's business and assets were sold to a company called Sevco Scotland Ltd, a consortium led by Green, in a deal worth £5.5m. Sevco was subsequently renamed The Rangers Football Club Ltd at the end of July 2012.

Ten of the other eleven SPL clubs voted against allowing Rangers to transfer their SPL membership share to a new company on 4 July, leaving the club applying for a place in the Scottish Football League. On 13 July, 29 out of 30 SFL member clubs voted to give Rangers associate membership, but 25 of them also voted to place the club into the Third Division of the Scottish Football League from the start of the season. Rangers clinched the Third Division title on 30 March after a goalless draw at Montrose, combined with a Queen's Park defeat.

Apart from being defeated 2–1 by Forfar in the first round of the League Cup on 3 August, season 2013–14 began with Rangers obtaining maximum points in their first fifteen games in League One. 2014 was a mixed bag for the club: they reached the Ramsden's Cup Final, in which they were beaten by Raith Rovers. On 3 May, after a 1–1 draw with Dunfermline, Rangers players made history by becoming its first team in 115 years to go an entire league season unbeaten, finishing as Scottish League One champions.

Rangers' boardroom politics were a fractious force, causing a constant flux with change after change of various directorial positions, rival factions attempting to take control of the company and the emergence of Mike Ashley as the majority stakeholder and power-broker in late 2014. That summer saw continued discontent with various fans groups, alongside Dave King, attempting to influence the board by withdrawing season-ticket money. This resulted in a drop of around 15,000 season tickets from the previous season, leaving the club requiring a financial injection which the board hoped would come from a share issue and announced this in June. However, the initial intention of raising up to £10 million through an investment plan by the end of August failed when city investors did not purchase enough shares; therefore, the club relaunched a £4 million issue open to all existing shareholders only.

Rangers fans' discontent was demonstrated during a Championship game against Queen of the South at Ibrox by their holding up red cards in the 18th and 72nd minutes. This was followed on 3 September by a report that Mike Ashley had bought the naming rights to Ibrox Stadium for just £1 in a deal with Charles Green in 2012. Concurrently, Rangers' former commercial director Imran Ahmad finally succeeded in a bid to have £620,000 of club assets frozen prior to pursuing litigation over an alleged unpaid £500,000 bonus. A few days later, the club were granted leave to appeal this decision, yet on 12 September, the club agreed to a settlement with Ahmad. As some Rangers supporters groups considered boycotting home matches in protest at the board, it was reported that Ashley would not be participating in the share offer.

Ashley's motives for not investing became clear the following month with his withholding much-needed money from the club in order to undermine the board. At the end of the share issue, on 12 September it was announced that it had raised just over £3 million, still £1 million short of its minimum target. The share issue was undertaken in order to allow Rangers to continue to operate into the new year, but the failure to reach the targets meant that further funding was required. A few days later, it came to light that Sandy Easdale had met with several investors that had been introduced to him by Rafat Rizvi, a convicted fraudster wanted by Interpol, which led to calls by the Union of Fans for Easdale to resign. Easdale subsequently increased his personal shareholding at Rangers to 5.21% on 24 September. On the same day, the club repaid the £1.5 million loan to Sandy Easdale and George Letham. The next day, BNP Paribas bought a 5% stake in Rangers, making it the fifth-largest shareholder. Less than 24 hours later, however, it was reported that the transaction was completed on Ashley's behalf, thus increasing his stake to 8.92%. A few days later, Ashley's holding company, MASH Holdings, called for an extraordinary general meeting (EGM) to remove chief executive Wallace. This signalled the start of a crucial stage in the boardroom power struggle at Rangers, with King appearing to be outflanked by Ashley, who had secured the support of Sandy Easdale, David Sommers, as well as the largest shareholder in Rangers, Laxey Partners.

When offers of funding from Dave King, a £16 million package, and Brian Kennedy were rejected by Rangers' hierarchy, who instead opted Mike Ashley's £2 million loan offer, it was clear who was victorious. Particularly as Ashley's initial offer was insufficient and he had to be provide another £1 million of funding less than a month later. In exchange for the initial funding, Ashley was granted critical power at the club with the privilege to put forward the names of two nominees for appointment to the board as well as security over Edmiston House and Albion Car Park. As a consequence of his power gain, both Philip Nash and Graham Wallace were forced out of the club and Derek Llambias and Barry Leach were brought in, initially as consultants, before being appointed chief executive and finance director, respectively. Also, David Somers was named executive chairman, on a temporary basis, in order to aid the transition. Financial respite was short-lived as Rangers announced its preliminary results at the end of November, indicating the club required another £8m of investment to see out the season. This effectively left Rangers at the mercy of Ashley, who could dictate the terms of and source of any future funding. Due to this power, the Scottish Football Association issued Ashley with a notice of complaint for breached a joint agreement that Ashley would not play a controlling role in Rangers and would maintain a stake of no more than 10%. Although Ashley had previously loaned the club £2 million and a further £1 million, as well as having two directors on the Rangers board and a significant interest in Rangers retail operations, he did return the naming rights to Ibrox Stadium to Rangers. On Christmas Eve, the SFA denied him permission to increase his stakehold in Rangers further. Also in December, the Scottish Professional Football League added to Rangers' financial woes by withholding £250,000 of broadcast money the club was due in a bid to recoup a fine imposed by the Nimmo Smith Commission.

The legal implications of the previous company that owned the club's liquidation featured prevalently in the news in July and November. In the summer, HM Revenue and Customs lost its appeal over the previous club's owners use of employee benefit trusts but was granted leave to appeal a month later. Meanwhile, Rangers former chairman Craig Whyte was banned from being a company director for fifteen years in September and a warrant was issued for his arrest a month later. He appeared in court, facing charges under the Companies Act, but was released on bail. Four men have appeared in court charged with fraudulent activity following a probe into the sale of Rangers in 2011. David Grier, Paul Clark and David Whitehouse (both administrators working for Duff & Phelps) and Gary Withey (a former solicitor for Collyer Bristow) made no plea or declaration at Glasgow Sheriff Court and were granted bail. Meanwhile, the liquidators of Rangers former owners secured a £24 million payment from Collyer Bristow, the law firm that acted for Whyte when he bought the club.

On the football front, Rangers' league campaign began with a defeat to newly relegated Hearts, with the Edinburgh club scoring an injury-time winner. Despite embarking on a nine-game unbeaten run in all competitions, a loss at home to Hibernian left Rangers trailing leaders Hearts by six points at the end of September. Better news for Rangers was the reaching of the League Cup semi-final after a 1–0 win over St Johnstone. They were drawn against Celtic, setting up the first Old Firm derby in two years. Nevertheless, the club's title charge was effectively ended in November as the side lost a six-pointer match away to league leaders Hearts leaving them nine points behind. They did bounce back the following week in the Scottish Cup registering a 3–0 win over Premiership side Kilmarnock, however, in the club's third cup competition the team surrendered a 2–0 lead to lose 3–2 to fellow Championship team Alloa Athletic in the Challenge Cup. Even with the poor league form and exit in the Challenge Cup, there was no indication of significant pressure on manager Ally McCoist. The effect of the club's financial issues, as underlined by the interim results that November, proved the catalyst for McCoist's departure as he became unhappy with the number of staff losing their jobs at Rangers. The situation became too much for McCoist, and he tendered his resignation on 12 December which was later confirmed to the London Stock Exchange by the club three days later, with McCoist beginning a twelve-month notice period; however, McCoist served less than a week of his notice period before being placed on gardening leave by the board, with his assistant manager Kenny McDowall being appointed interim manager until the end of the season.

== McCall, Warburton, Premiership return, Caixinha and Murty (2015–2018) ==
The start of 2015 saw Mike Ashley's control over Rangers weakened as deals were made with a consortium, led by Dave King, to purchase the shareholding of Laxey Partners which had stood at 16%. King took control of a 14.57% stake and two weeks later called for an EGM on 16 January. The original date was set by the board was 4 March in a hotel in London; however, this was then moved to Ibrox Stadium, after two successive hotels refused to host the event, with a date of 6 March. During the run-up to the EGM, the incumbent Rangers board agreed £10m funding deal with Sports Direct. The agreement saw Sports Direct hold a floating charge over Murray Park, Edmiston House, Albion Car Park and the club's registered trademarks. Sports Direct was also transferred 26% of Rangers' share in Rangers Retail Limited (Rangers previously held 51%, with Sports Direct holding the balance). The club were bound to forego all shirt sponsorship revenue for the 2016–17 season and subsequent seasons until the loan was repaid. On transfer deadline day, Rangers were loaned five players from Newcastle United, a Premier League club that Ashley owns.

February saw a large volume of share purchases, and Rangers supporters groups were heavily involved. With the writing apparently on the wall, Rangers director James Easdale resigned just over a week before the EGM and chairman Somers departed with fours days to go. The SFA's investigation into Ashley concluded at the beginning of March that Ashley was deemed to have broken rules on dual ownership due to his influence on the affairs of Rangers. He was fined £7,500, and Rangers were subsequently fined £5,500 over a month later for their lack of governance. Just two days before the EGM, the club's nominated adviser, WH Ireland, resigned, resulting shares in the plc being suspended. The outcome of the EGM was a decisive victory for King's consortium, with Derek Llambias and finance director Barry Leach being voted off the board, replaced by King, Paul Murray and John Giligan. Both King and Murray subsequently applied to be passed as a fit and proper person by the SFA, with the later being cleared at the beginning of May. Further board appointments were made, with John Bennett and Chris Graham added to the plc board as non-executive directors. James Blair was appointed company secretary. Graham resigned his directorship three days later. On the same day as the appointments, Rangers suspended Llambias, Leach and Sandy Easdale from its football club board pending an internal investigation.

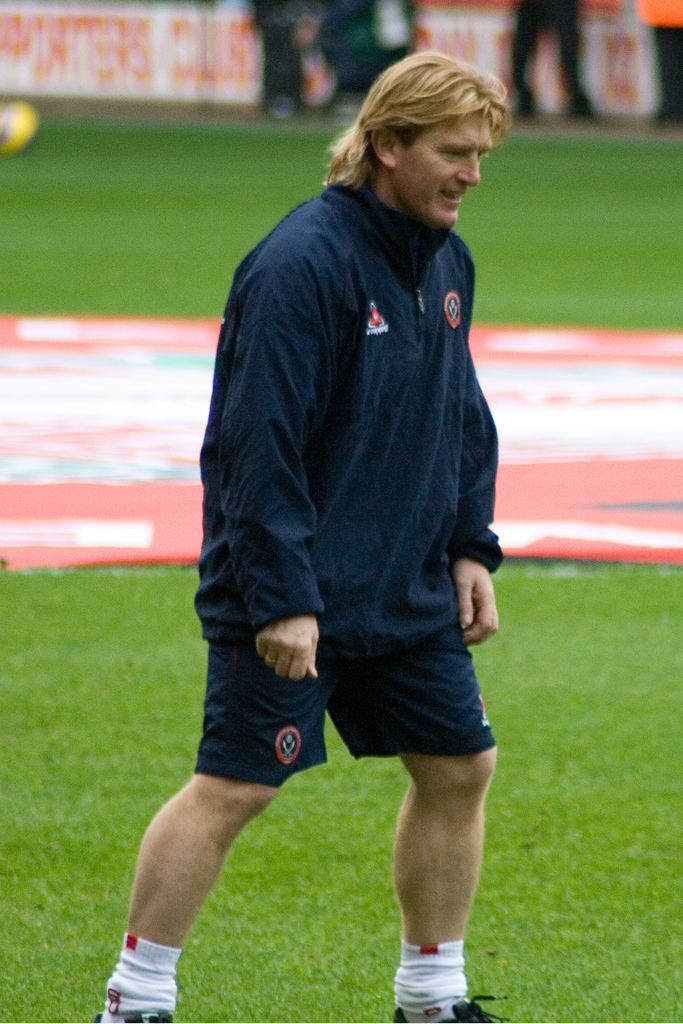
Stuart McCall, who made over 200 appearances for Rangers, became the club's interim manager between March and June 2015

After poor results in both the league and Scottish Cup, Stuart McCall replaced Kenny McDowall as interim manager. At the end of March, it was revealed that five loan signings from Newcastle United were signed without medicals. On same day as interim accounts were published, 31 March, it emerged that Rangers would have owed Newcastle United £500,000 if they were promoted due to the agreement struck when loaning the players. It was announced on 2 April that Rangers would be de-listed from the Alternative Investment Market stock exchange after failing to find a nominated adviser within the required period. The SPFL courted controversy with the final-day fixtures by moving the Rangers v. Hearts match from Saturday to Sunday, with the rest of the matches proceeding on the Saturday. This could have given Rangers a possible advantage in the chase for second place. The SPFL performed a U-turn, with all matches being scheduled for early Saturday afternoon. As it transpired, the team failed to be automatically promoted to the Premiership, drawing the final two league matches and finishing third in the league. This meant the club faced at least six play-off matches in order to gain promotion. The ticket pricing of these matches attracted controversy. Following a precedent set by Hibernian the previous season, Rangers stated they would allow season ticket holders entry to home matches for free; however, this was rejected by the SPFL. Rangers then announced a blanket £5 ticket price offer for all seats. The side successfully negotiated two play-off rounds before falling to a 6–1 aggregate defeat to Premiership team Motherwell. The second leg of the play-off final ended in controversy as Rangers' Bilel Mohsni and Motherwell's Lee Erwin brawled on the pitch after the match as Motherwell fans invaded the pitch to goad the Rangers fans.

The police probed the role of Mike Ashley and Sports Direct in the Rangers takeover and searched the company's headquarters. This was rumoured to be the reason that Ashley demanded the repayment of his £5m loan to the club. Rangers set the date of the general meeting for June 2015 and added its own resolutions and proposals. On 19 May, King was passed fit and proper by the SFA and became chairman of the club on 22 May. On the same day, King also loaned the club an additional £1.5m. A day later, former Rangers player John Greig was named honorary president of the club.

In early June, Ibrox Stadium played host to the company's second EGM in just over three months. A majority of shareholders voted in favour of a board resolution to renegotiate existing retail agreements with Sports Direct and voted against the early repayment of a loan from Mike Ashley. Rangers made further appointments to the board, with Stewart Robertson joining as managing director and Andrew Dickinson being promoted to financial director.

The spectre of the previous board loomed large at the beginning of the season as Police Scotland's investigation into the sale of Rangers' assets to a consortium led by Charles Green led to arrests and seven indictments. On 1 September, both Craig Whyte and Green were arrested as part of the inquiry into the "alleged fraudulent acquisition" of Rangers' assets in 2012. Just over two weeks later, indictments were served on seven accused, including Green and Whyte, David Whitehouse, Paul Clark, David Grier (who were all working for administrators Duff and Phelps at the time), Gary Withey (who worked for a law firm involved in the purchase of Rangers by Whyte) and Imran Ahmad, a former Rangers commercial director. Indeed, the latter indicated that he would not co-operate with the proceedings; subsequently a warrant was issued for his arrest and charges against him were temporarily stopped. A week later, Green took the company to the Court of Session in an attempt to force the PLC to pay his legal fees with regards to the forthcoming trial; however, the action was dismissed by Lord Doherty a few months later and an appeal to the Inner House was also refused in March 2016.

On 30 October 2015, Rangers announced it was not appropriate to proceed with a share issue and listing on the ISDX market until the criminal proceedings being brought against Charles Green, Imran Ahmed, Craig Whyte and others was concluded. On 5 February 2016, prosecutors withdrew six of fifteen charges brought against the six men in the alleged Rangers fraud case, which resulted in all charges against Duff and Phelps administrators David Whitehouse and Paul Clark being dropped, although prosecutors indicated there would be filing fresh charges against the pair. Charges against Green were also dropped, meaning that the former chief executive of the club was not facing any. A few months later, in May 2016, it was announced that charges against Gary Withey and David Grier were dropped and that they would not stand trial alongside former Rangers owner Craig Whyte, the only person still facing charges.

On 4 November 2015, the club's PLC owner, Rangers International Football Club, announced a loss of £7.5m for the year ending June 2015. This meant the company was required to find approximately £2.5m in order to cover expenses for the rest of the season. Moreover, the outcome of HMRC's appeal against the decision of the First-tier Tribunal regarding the previous owner and its use of EBT's. The Court of Session ruled that the use of employee benefit trusts broke tax rules; therefore, the payments were eligible for tax deductions, although an appeal to the Supreme Court was sought less than a month later and granted in March 2016. This judgement caused debate in Scottish football as many people erroneously believed the decision made by the Nimmo Smith commission not to strip Rangers of titles was based on the outcome of the tax case. Coincidentally, the commission's ruling was taken to an arbitration tribunal by the club's owners with RIFC PLC disputing its liability for the £250,000 fine plus £150,000 in additional costs, imposed on the company that previous owned the club. The SPFL subsequently imposed this on the new owners of the club as part of the terms of the five-way agreement. An independent SFA tribunal ruled that RIFC PLC was liable for the fine in March 2016.

Further legal matters occurred a week later, although not directly involving Rangers, as Mike Ashley lodged a challenge to the SFA's decision to pass King as a fit and proper person by seeking a Judicial review; however, the litigation was abandoned in April 2016 after his legal team received information about King's finances which the SFA used in their fit and proper deliberations. Ashley had also raised court proceedings against Dave King, accusing him of breaching a court injunction regarding the commercial agreements between Rangers and Sports Direct; however, the Royal Courts of Justice dismissed the motion for him to be jailed. A further accusation that King committed contempt of court was also dismissed. In the end, the court action against King was discontinued by Sports Direct as the company halted litigation, claiming a breach of confidentiality, in relation to a commercial deal, which the judge called "ridiculous".

The end of November saw the PLC's annual general meeting; however, prior to this, Mike Ashley continued with his ligation against the company and successfully managed to have Resolution 11 withdrawn which would have allowed shareholders to block the voting rights of dual ownership shareholders. The AGM passed without major incident; however, chairman Dave King announced the adoption of the living wage for company employees and the repayment of a £5m loan from Ashley's Sports Direct. Although, on 11 December, it was reported that the company had not repaid the £5m loan despite earlier claims to the contrary. On Christmas Eve, Rangers announced that the loan had been repaid to Ashley in full and it was later revealed, on Ne'erday, that Rangers had borrowed £6.5m from King and others in order to do this. On 4 February, it was announced by the Rangers board that they had given Sports Direct formal notice that they wish to end their retail deal for club merchandise. On 18 May, Rangers indicated its intention to end the joint venture with Sports Direct for selling club kits and merchandise. This included the withdrawal of the rights to use club trademarks.

On the football front, Rangers appointed its fourteenth permanent manager on 15 June in the shape of Mark Warburton, who agreed a three-year contract. Warburton was joined at the club by former Rangers centre-back David Weir, who became his assistant manager. The start to the season saw Rangers embark on a run of eleven straight victories in all competitions. This helped Warburton overtake former Rangers manager Bill Struth's record of eight consecutive wins by a manager at the beginning of their Ibrox career. Ultimately, this would could not continue: the series of victories came to an abrupt halt in mid-September as the club suffered a 3–1 defeat to St Johnstone in the League Cup. Despite this, Rangers continuing a winning steak for the first eleven games of the league season which gave the club an eight-point lead over second-placed Hibernian at the top of the table by late October. Eight points were picked up from a possible eighteen over the next six league games, including two defeats to Hibernian and Falkirk. This left Rangers tied with the Edinburgh club on forty-one points ahead of crucial match between the two during the festive period. Rangers played Hibernian on 28 December at Ibrox, beating Alan Stubbs' side 4–2. They then embarked on an unbeaten run of ten matches, winning nine, with only Alloa Athletic managing to take points off them. Alongside this rich vein of form, second-placed Hibs suffered a run of three defeats within a week to see them trail Rangers at the top of the table by fourteen points as the season entered March.

The league crown was secured for Rangers on 5 April at Ibrox and formed the first part of a brace of trophies within a week. The team qualified for its second Challenge Cup Final in the space of three years with the match being played at Hampden Park for the first time in the competition's history. The match was played in front of a near sell-out as Rangers ran out 4–0 winners over Scottish League One side Peterhead on 10 April. Similarly, in the Scottish Cup, the club reached its second semi-final in three seasons, setting up the first Old Firm derby in over a year. A highly anticipated match ended with both sides tied after full and extra time with Rangers winning the penalty shoot-out to progress to the final. The semi-final heroics were ultimately for nothing as Rangers lost the 2016 Scottish Cup Final to Hibernian with the Edinburgh club scoring an injury-time winner. However, their victory was marred by a pitch invasion by Hibs fans at the final whistle. The SFA has said it is "appalled" by scenes of disorder and set up a commission to review operational failings apparent from the day. Police Scotland also investigated the events, which included assaults on Rangers players and staff.

On 18 December 2016, Rangers announced a coaching and development partnership with Scottish Lowland League club Gala Fairydean Rovers which effectivelty saw the Galashiels side act as a feeder to Rangers.

The club's pre-season plans were confirmed in May with the first team's squad travelling to the United States for a training camp which incorporated a friendly match against United Soccer League side Charleston Battery. The fallout from the 2016 Scottish Cup Final fan violence continued with the SFA announcing a former Sheriff principal would chair the independent commission into the disorder. The commission reported on 5 August and concluded the pitch invasion was sparked by the high excitement of Hibernian fans, yet neither club could be blamed. The report highlighted security plans were appropriate and that the Scottish Government should consider criminalising pitch invasions. However, Rangers raised concerns about several factual inaccuracies and contradictions in the report and asked to discuss this with the SFA.

On 30 August 2016, Rangers and Hibernian were issued with notices of complaint by the Scottish FA's compliance officer in relation to the Scottish Cup Final. The end of May saw Rangers continue preparations for the forthcoming season with the signing of English Championship winner Joey Barton from Burnley, Liverpool youth player Jordan Rossiter and former Tottenham Hotspur playmaker Niko Kranjčar. Rangers managing director Stewart Robertson also disclosed that manager Mark Warburton and his assistant David Weir were negotiating new contracts, with the pair agreeing one-year extensions on 12 July. Warburton went on to bring in eleven new players in total, including paying a million-pound-plus transfer fee for Englishman Joe Garner which represented the largest investment made by Rangers in a player for over five years, since the signing of former club captain Lee Wallace in July 2011.

In June 2016, it was announced by the SPFL that the Challenge Cup would be expanded to include teams from the Welsh Premier League, Northern Irish Premiership and an under-20s side from each Scottish Premiership club. On the same day as this announcement, the under-20s team coach Ian Durrant was relieved of his duties in a coaching reshuffle, with Rangers appointing Graeme Murty as Head Development Squad Coach on 17 August to replace him. The draw for the first round of the 2016–17 Challenge Cup was made, with Rangers' under-20s side paired with Lowland Football League side Stirling University F.C. The U-20 side progressed by beating Stirling University 4–0 at Forthbank Stadium, with Josh Jeffries scoring twice. A second-round tie with Scottish League One side Stenhousemuir was set up, again played at Forthbank; however, the side could not match its previous performance and went down 3–1, with Ryan Hardie netting the Rangers goal.

The senior side began the season in mid-July as part of the new-look League Cup format, paired in a group with Motherwell, Annan Athletic, East Stirlingshire and Stranraer. The season got off to a winning start as the side beat Motherwell and Annan Athletic. After topping their group and strong showings in the two subsequent rounds, Rangers set up a semi-final against Celtic; however, the side lost 1–0, which ended their participation in the competition. The side's league form proved equally fruitless as they engaged in a faulting start to the season which culminated in a 5–1 defeat to Celtic. The opening league match of the season saw Rangers stutter to a 1–1 draw at home to Hamilton Academical and despite registering wins in the following two matches Rangers went through the month of September without winning a league match, including defeats to both Aberdeen and Celtic. The aftermath from the latter match saw Rangers suspend midfielder Joey Barton for three weeks. He had been involved in a training-ground bust-up with fellow midfielder Andy Halliday a few days after losing to Celtic. The suspension was extended by another week on 9 October and Barton was also charged by the Scottish Football Association for breaking rules relating to gambling on football matches.

Upon the completion of his suspension, Barton returned to Ibrox for a meeting on 27 October; however, upon its conclusion it emerged that he remained suspended by the club, and no party made further comment. In the meantime, despite the first-team's indifferent league form, the side still sat second in the Premiership by the end of October, even though two of the marquee summer signings had effectively been ruled out for the season, with Barton returning from suspension but being relegated to the youth team and Niko Kranjčar suffering cruciate ligament injury, which sidelined him for the rest of the season. Barton was unhappy at being relegated to the youth team and was signed off with stress on 8 November, but the saga came to a conclusion two days later when the Englishman mutually agreed to a contract termination.

The side's form improved through December, with a four-match winning run on the back of a 2–0 defeat to Hearts at Tynecastle on 30 November. The final two matches of 2016 saw the side collect one point from a possible six, with a draw at St Johnstone and defeat in the third Old Firm derby of the season. This left the club second in the table going into 2017 and the mid-season break, two points ahead of third-placed Aberdeen, although the Dons had a game in hand. The January transfer window saw the club released several former youth prospects who had failed to meet expectations, while Mark Warburton brought in two young loanee signings from English Premier League sides in the shape of Emerson Hyndman and Jon Toral from AFC Bournemouth and Arsenal, respectively. However, the lack of any permanent outfield signings drew criticism, as did the performances of the previous summer's transfers, with particular focus being placed on the role of Head of Recruitment Frank McParland.

On 10 February 2017, manager Warburton, assistant manager David Weir and McParland left Rangers. Graeme Murty was placed in caretaker control of the first team. Several reasons for the trio's departure were highlighted by the media, as well as the club. The first team's poor performance in the first half of the season a prominent cause, which crystallised after a 4–1 defeat at Hearts on 1 February and a 1–1 draw at home to Ross County three days later, a match which proved to be Warburton's last game in charge. The poor signing policy was mooted; however, the club also stated that the management team were not committed to the job and reported the team had tendered their resignations five days before being replaced, which Warburton later disputed. Early contenders for the role included former Rangers manager Alex McLeish and former Rangers defender Frank de Boer. On 14 February 2017, managing director Stewart Robertson announced that the club would seek to appoint a Director of Football to work alongside a new first-team manager.

Graeme Murty's time in charge began with a fourth-round Scottish Cup win over Greenock Morton; however, league formed remained indifferent, for his first two league matches ende in defeats at Dundee and Inverness. This left the side in third place, six points adrift of Aberdeen, at the beginning of March. A dramatic 3–2 win of St Johnstone saw Murty register his only league win in his six-game spell as manager, with his last two games in charge seeing him set up to a Scottish Cup semi-final against Celtic after a 6–0 win over Hamilton Academical, the team's largest win of the season, before drawing the third league Old Firm match. On 11 March, Rangers confirmed Pedro Caixinha as the club's fifteenth manager with the Portuguese coach appointed two days later. The pursuit of a Director of Football was not as successful as the board's first choice, Southampton's Ross Wilson, turned down the offer of the role.

Away from football, the board instigated court proceedings against four of its former executives and investor Mike Ashley. The case against former chief executives Charles Green and Derek Llambias, former commercial director Imran Ahmad, former financial director Brian Stockbridge and Ashley was brought regarding a loss of income caused by retail deals agreed between the company that owns the club and Sports Direct from 2012 to 2015. Details of Rangers' legal claim was revealed on 12 August after Ashley's lawyers succeeded in a bid to have the documents disclosed. According to the papers lodged with the Court of Session, Rangers sought approximately £4.1m in damages caused by alleged negligence by Green and other club staff from which Ashley unfairly benefited. Rangers regained representation at a domestic football level as managing director Stewart Robertson was appointed to the SFA board, although he had initially signalled his intent to stand for the SPFL board but withdrew due to a lack of support. Meanwhile, the former Rangers owner Craig Whyte was the only person facing fraud charges relating to the liquidation of The Rangers Football Club Plc proceedings begun in June. In a bizarre twist, former Rangers vice-chairman Donald Findlay was appointed to Whyte's legal team and defended Whyte when he faced charges relating to the acquisition of the club in May 2011 and its subsequent financial mismanagement. On 22 December, at his pre-trial Whyte entered a not-guilty plea at the High Court in Glasgow. The trial concerning accusations of fraudulent acquisition of the club began in April 2017, with former Rangers managers Walter Smith and Ally McCoist called to give evidence about the financial situation at the club preceding Whyte's reign.

The corporate aftermath of Whyte's reign was continued and it was revealed that club administrators had raised legal action against Police Scotland and the Lord Advocate while creditors would receive £2m less in potential payouts after the liquidation costs increased, leaving the total payout at £16.663m. Although RIFC did settle a fine imposed upon the club by the Nimmo Smith commission after a tribunal held against the club in October 2015, the total cost was £286,000. At the start of February, it was reported that liquidators of the old company, BDO, had launched a legal action against former administrators Duff & Phelps over the business strategies adopted by the administrating team and seeking up to £28.9m in damages.

The spectre of Mike Ashley continued to haunt Rangers in the early part of the season. He lost a legal challenge to the SFA's fine over breaching dual ownership rules with reports he faced a £250,000 legal bill. In October, he was ordered to pay half of the SFA's legal costs and an additional fee for the costs incurred from receiving specialist legal advice. Moreover, further failed legal action meant Ashley was required to pay the legal costs of the SFA and Dave King following a failed bid to overturn the decision that King was a "fit and proper" person from April 2016. Despite standing down from the board of Rangers Retail in June 2016, the club's joint merchandising venture with Sports Direct, Ashley refused to relinquish his grip over Rangers retail operations. After reaching an impasse in its attempts to renegotiate the retail agreements with Sports Direct, a stand-off ensued between the retailer and Rangers, with the latter withdrew removing rights to use the club's intellectual property which would impact on the sale of Rangers new Puma football kits. Despite the club withdrawing permission to use its trademarks, which effectively halted the sale of kits, Puma released the 2016–17 kits at the beginning of August. This led to the board to consider replacing the Puma kits with an alternative. The contract with Rangers Retail reportedly earned the club only four pence from every pound spent on merchandise and was highlighted as a reason for Rangers' weak financial performance. On 31 October 2016 it emerged that Ashley lodged a counter-suit against Rangers, King and director Paul Murray, with initial proceedings regarding the case being heard at the High Court of Justice in March 2017.

The board released RIFC's annual accounts on 28 October which revealed annual losses had been halved to £3.3m and turnover increased to £22.2m; however, further funding was required to maintain the business as a going concern. In March 2017, following a complaint by former Rangers chairman David Somers, the Takeover Appeal Board ruled that Dave King had been acting in concert with other investors during King's March 2015 boardroom takeover. This meant that King was liable to purchase all of the shares in RIFC, with the TAB setting a price of 20p per share. A few days later, RIFC revealed an operating profit of £300,000 in unaudited results for the six months to 31 December 2016, although this equated to a pre-tax loss of £278,000.

Rangers fan groups Rangers Supporters' Trust, Rangers Supporters Assembly and Rangers First merged to form Club 1872 in late May, and two weeks later it announced that the new organisation had purchased enough shares to make it the sixth-largest shareholder in RIFC. Harmony did not last for long amongst the support, however, as three directors of the Rangers First resigned from the organisation over a row regarding its governance, with Rangers First now the shareholding vehicle for Club 1872. On 30 September, the results of the first elections to Club 1872's board was announced, with seven members elected including Rangers current company secretary James Blair, former requisitioner Alex Wilson, as well as the leader of Sons of Struth Craig Houston. In November, the fans' group increased its holding further to become the fifth-largest individual shareholder, possessing just over five million ordinary shares; however, further setbacks saw three directors resign from the board of Club 1872 after only six months in their post.

Rangers exited the Europa League in the first qualifying round, losing 2–1 on aggregate to FC Progrès Niederkorn. An indifferent start to the league campaign followed, with two defeats in their first seven games, compounded with a defeat at home to Motherwell in the semi-finals of the League Cup on 22 October. Pedro Caixinha was relieved of his duties four days later. Graeme Murty was installed as caretaker manager again. Rangers finished third in the Premiership, twelve points behind champions Celtic. They had exited the Scottish Cup at the semi-finals stage to Celtic, who went on to win the competition. Murty was sacked on 1 May, replaced in an interim capacity by his assistant Jimmy Nicholl and Jonatan Johansson. In the transfer market, Ryan Jack had arrived on a free transfer from Aberdeen. Colombian striker Alfredo Morelos joined, for an undisclosed fee, from HJK Helsinki. He was the club's joint-top-scorer in all competitions, with eighteen goals, alongside Josh Windass. Out had gone midfielder Billy Gilmour to Chelsea, again for an undisclosed amount.

== The Gerrard era (2018–2021) ==
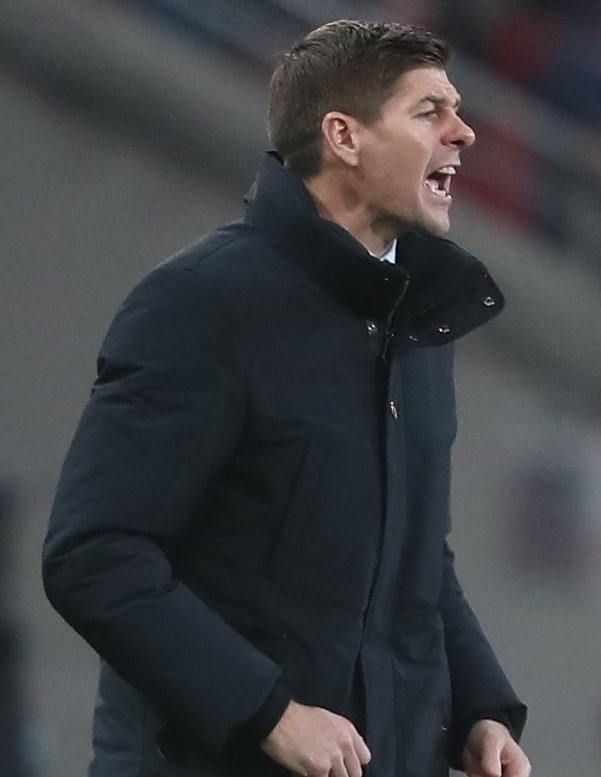
Steven Gerrard as Rangers manager, 2018

In the summer, Rangers' chairman Dave King convinced former Liverpool and England captain Steven Gerrard to begin his senior managerial career in Glasgow. New arrivals prior to Gerrard's installment included Scott Arfield and the returning Allan McGregor, both on free transfers. Gerrard brought in Connor Goldson from Brighton for an undisclosed fee. He was followed by Borna Barišić, who joined from NK Osijek in a £2.2 million deal. Loans included Ryan Kent from Liverpool, Jermain Defoe from Bournemouth and Steven Davis from Southampton.

Rangers finished second in the Premiership, nine points behind champions Celtic, who completed an unprecedent treble treble. The club fell at the quarter-finals stage of the Scottish Cup. They went one better in the League Cup. After navigating the qualification stage of the Europa League, Rangers finished third behind Villarreal and Rapid Wien and failed to advance to the knockout phase.

Steven Gerrard's second season began with the permanent signing of Steven Davis after his contract with Southampton expired. Also joining was Nigerian midfielder Joe Aribo from Charlton Athletic. Ryan Kent also made permanent his move from Liverpool to Ibrox for an undisclosed fee.

After an unbeaten pre-season, Rangers won the first three league fixtures, but lost out, 2–0 at home, in the first Old Firm derby of the campaign. Celtic continued to hold off their city rivals for the remainder of the season and claimed their ninth league title in a row by a thirteen-point margin. Celtic also beat them in the Scottish League Cup Final, while they were knocked out of the Scottish Cup quarter-finals by Hearts.

Rangers again made it through the Europa League qualifiers, and this time advanced to the knockout phase after finishing as runners-up behind Porto in Group G. They were eliminated by Bayer Leverkusen in the round of 16.

Douglas Park succeeded Dave King as Rangers chairman during the summer. Also incoming were Ianis Hagi, making permanent his former loan move from K.R.C. Genk, Nigerian defender Calvin Bassey from Leicester City, Jermain Defoe (making his former loan permanent) and Jamaican forward Kemar Roofe from R.S.C. Anderlecht.

Rangers finished the league season unbeaten (including a fifteen-game winning streak) to prevent Celtic from achieving the coveted ten-in-a-row as they finished on 102 points, twenty-five ahead of their city rivals. It was Steven Gerrard's first piece of silverware in his three years at Ibrox. The club also reached the quarter-finals of both domestic cup competitions, which were both won by St Johnstone.

The club qualified for the Europa League group stage for the third-straight season. This time, they won their group, beating Benfice by two points. They again made it to the round of 16, in which they lost to 3–1 on aggregate to SK Slavia Prague. They had two players sent off in the second leg at Ibrox.

== Giovanni van Bronckhorst, Europa League Final, Michael Beale return and Philippe Clement (2021–present) ==
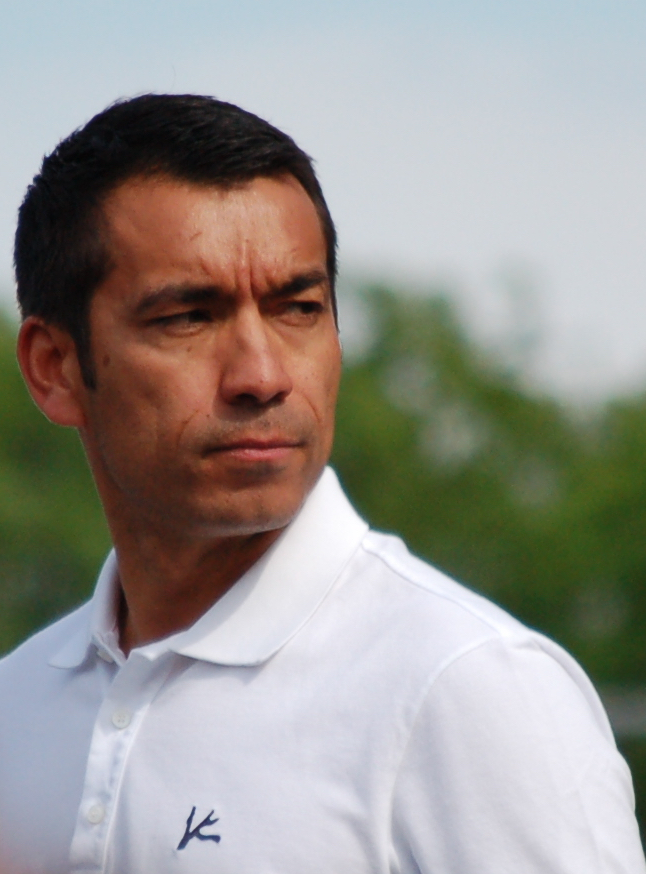
Giovanni van Bronckhorst became Rangers' seventeenth manager in November 2021

Midway through the 2021–22 season, Steven Gerrard left Rangers for Aston Villa, and was replaced by former Rangers midfielder Giovanni van Bronckhorst on 11 November 2021. He led Rangers to their first European final in fourteen years, beating Borussia Dortmund, Red Star Belgrade, Braga and RB Leipzig on the way to facing Eintracht Frankfurt in the 2022 UEFA Europa League Final. He also took the club to their first Scottish Cup final in six years, in which they beat Hearts.

In the 2022–23 season, Rangers qualified for the UEFA Champions League group stage for the first time since the 2010–11 season. They went on to lose all six group matches against Napoli, Liverpool, and Ajax with only two goals scored and a −20 goal difference overall, setting the worst performance in a Champions League group stage, surpassing Dinamo Zagreb's −19 goal difference in the 2011–12 season. Giovanni van Bronckhorst was sacked on 21 November 2022, after also falling nine points behind Celtic in the Scottish Premiership. Michael Beale, a coach under previous manager Steven Gerrard, succeeded van Bronckhorst on 28 November 2022. After a winning start, Beale had turned around results quickly; however, they lost out in both cup competitions against Celtic and finished the 2022–23 season seven points behind their rivals. After a summer rebuild, Rangers lost on the opening day of the 2023–24 season to Kilmarnock; their hopes of qualifying for that seasons Champions League was also crushed after losing to PSV Eindhoven. Beale was sacked as manager on 1 October 2023, the defeat to Aberdeen at Ibrox the culmination of a very poor run of results.

Philippe Clement was appointed manager on 15 October 2023, Rangers' sixth permanent manager in ten years, with Steven Davis being the interim manager prior to Clement's appointment. The club won their 28th League Cup title, and their first in twelve years. Rangers finished runners up to Celtic in the league and the Scottish Cup. After being defeated by Dynamo Kyiv in the 2024–25 Champions League Third Qualifying Round, Rangers entered the Europa League, where they placed eighth in the new format, placing them directly in the Round of 16. Clement was sacked as manager on 23 February 2025. On 24 February 2025, Barry Ferguson was appointed as interim head coach following the dismissal of Clement. He brought former teammates Neil McCann, Billy Dodds and Allan McGregor onto the coaching team.
