= 2006–07 Rangers F.C. season =

Rangers
2006–07 season
- Chairman: David Murray
- Manager: Paul Le Guen (until 4 January); Ian Durrant (from 4 January) (until 10 January); Walter Smith (from 10 January)
- Ground: Ibrox Stadium; Glasgow, Scotland (Capacity: 51,082)
- Scottish Premier League: 2nd
- Scottish Cup: Third round
- League Cup: Quarter-finals
- UEFA Cup: Round of 16
- Top goalscorer: League: Kris Boyd (20); All: Kris Boyd (26)
Home colours	Away colours	Third colours

The 2006–07 season was the 127th season of competitive football by Rangers.

== Overview ==
Rangers played a total of 51 competitive matches during the 2006–07 season. After signs that supporter unrest was turning on Murray, on 9 February 2006, two days before the crucial Old Firm match, it was announced that Alex McLeish would leave his position as manager at the end of the 2005–06 season, and on 11 March, it was confirmed that former Lyon manager Paul Le Guen would indeed succeed him at the end of the season. Murray predicted a fruitful reign under Le Guen, describing his capture as "a massive moonbeam of success" for the club and promising, "we’ve got big plans." He announced that the Frenchman would be given significant funds with which to strengthen the squad, with Rangers having announced an arrangement with sports retailer JJB Sports.

Le Guen made early moves in the transfer market, signing South African Under 19 player Dean Furman from Chelsea, and youngsters William Stanger and Antoine Ponroy from Rennes. While allowing Ibrox favourite Alex Rae to move to a new career as player-manager of Dundee, he has also signed Libor Sionko and Karl Svensson. Rangers had been strongly linked with a host of other players and signed midfielder Jeremy Clement from Lyon and goalkeeper Lionel Letizi from Paris St Germain as a replacement for the departing Ronald Waterreus. Senegal's World Cup 2002 midfield player Makhtar N'Diaye signed a one-year contract after a short trial period with the club. In all, he made eleven signings (of them only Saša Papac would be playing for the club the following season). Le Guen's signings including Filip Šebo, Karl Svensson, Libor Sionko and Lionel Letizi but they simply did not perform, while Jérémy Clément was to be in Glasgow for only six months.

Rangers' first match under Le Guen was a friendly against Irish Premier League champions Linfield on 6 July 2006 at Windsor Park, Belfast. Rangers won 2–0 with first half goals from Kris Boyd and Thomas Buffel. The squad flew out to South Africa on 9 July for a training camp where they played three matches, the first of which was a comfortable 4–0 win over local opposition with Charlie Adam netting a hat-trick. Rangers also defeated Jomo Cosmos 2–0 but, with a largely depleted starting line-up, they lost their final match 2–0 against Premier Soccer League champions Mamelodi Sundowns. Defender Fernando Ricksen did not take any part in the pre-season tour of South Africa due to what was described by the club as "unacceptable behaviour" on the flight to Johannesburg. Rangers returned to face English Premier League sides Middlesbrough and Bolton Wanderers where they won 1–0 and drew 1–1 respectively. The SPL opening day on 30 July proved fruitful for Paul Le Guen's Rangers as they defeated Motherwell 2–1 at Fir Park, thanks to an early strike from Libor Sionko and the winning header from Dado Pršo In Le Guen's first competitive game at Ibrox, Rangers were held to a 2–2 draw by Dundee United, having been forced to come back from two-goals down.

On 9 August, Fernando Ricksen went to Russian Premier League club Zenit St. Petersburg, the new club of ex-Rangers manager Dick Advocaat, on a season-long loan. In return, a friendly has been scheduled between the teams at Ibrox on 23 August. On 11 August Rangers signed Manchester United's 19-year-old winger Lee Martin on loan for a season. Rangers also recruited the services of Austrian Vienna defender Saša Papac while Marvin Andrews, Olivier Bernard, Robert Malcolm and Hamed Namouchi all departed.

By mid November, Rangers found themselves in third place, a full 15 points behind leaders Celtic. Sporadic wins were mixed with regular dropped points as the team struggled to find consistency in the early part of the season. Rangers did, however, start promisingly in the UEFA Cup, going on to become the first Scottish club to qualify from the UEFA Cup group stage in its three-year history. Domestic results and performances, however, continued to be inconsistent and in January 2007, Le Guen controversially stripped midfielder Barry Ferguson of the captaincy.

On 4 January 2007 Paul Le Guen left Rangers by mutual consent. This made him the club's shortest-serving manager, and the only one to leave the club without completing a full season in charge.

At the start of the season it had appeared that Murray had brought one of Europe's most talented young coaches to Ibrox, but the Frenchman could not repeat his previous successes. Inconsistent form from the start in the league saw Rangers fall behind Celtic in the title race as early as October and they suffered the disappointment of going out of the League Cup at home to First Division side St Johnstone, losing 2–0. Le Guen left the club by mutual consent on 4 January 2007 and was replaced by Walter Smith, who began his second spell as manager of the club.

Immediately Smith began an overhaul at the club. He deemed the defence to be the main reason for Rangers poor season. The signings of defenders David Weir and Ugo Ehiogu soon followed, along with young midfielder Kevin Thomson from Hibernian. The side's form picked up and they ended the season in second place in the Scottish Premier League and recorded a brace of Old Firm wins over Celtic.

In the Scottish Cup, Rangers were beaten 3–2 to Dunfermline Athletic, in caretaker manager Ian Durrant's first and only game in charge.

== Players ==
=== Squad information ===
N	Pos.	Nat.	Name	Age	Since	App	Goals	Ends	Transfer fee	Notes
1	GK	(Germany)	Stefan Klos	35	1998	298	0	2007	£0.7m	
2	DF	(Netherlands)	Fernando Ricksen	30	2000	254	20	2009	£3.75m	left on 28 November
2	DF	(Scotland)	Andy Webster	25	2008	0	0	2007	Loan	
3	DF	(France)	Olivier Bernard	26	2005	15	0	2007	Free	left on 31 August
3	DF	(Scotland)	David Weir	37	2007	18	1	2007	Free	
4	MF	(Belgium)	Thomas Buffel	26	2005	81	16	2009	£2.3m	
5	DF	(Trinidad and Tobago)	Marvin Andrews	30	2004	68	8	2007	Free	left on 31 August
5	DF	(Bosnia and Herzegovina)	Saša Papac	27	2006	23	0	2009	£0.45m	
6	MF	(Scotland)	Barry Ferguson (captain)	29	2005	342	50	2010	£4.5m	
7	MF	(Algeria)	Brahim Hemdani	29	2005	73	2	2009	Free	
8	MF	(France)	Jérémy Clément	22	2006	23	0	2009	£1.1m	left on 25 January
8	MF	(Scotland)	Kevin Thomson	22	2007	12	0	2011	£2m	
9	FW	(Croatia)	Dado Pršo	32	2004	124	37	2007	Free	
10	FW	(Spain)	Nacho Novo	28	2004	139	38	2008	£0.45m	
11	MF	(Scotland)	Gavin Rae	29	2004	39	3	2007	£0.25m	
12	DF	(Scotland)	Robert Malcolm	25	1997	115	3	2009	Youth system	left on 31 August
12	DF	(England)	Ugo Ehiogu	34	2007	11	1	2008	Free	
14	MF	(Czech Republic)	Libor Sionko	30	2006	24	3	2009	Free	
15	FW	(Scotland)	Kris Boyd	23	2005	65	46	2010	£0.4m	
16	DF	(England)	Phil Bardsley	21	2006	7	1	2006	Loan	left on 29 December
17	MF	(Scotland)	Chris Burke	23	2000	108	10	2009	Youth system	
18	DF	(Scotland)	Ian Murray	26	2005	60	0	2008	Free	
19	DF	(Sweden)	Karl Svensson	23	2006	28	0	2009	£0.6m	
20	DF	(Scotland)	Alan Hutton	22	2000	91	3	2007	Youth system	
21	GK	(France)	Lionel Letizi	34	2006	8	0	2008	Free	left on 30 January
22	GK	(Scotland)	Allan McGregor	25	1998	53	0	2009	Youth system	
23	FW	(Slovakia)	Filip Šebo	23	2006	33	2	2010	£1.8m	
24	DF	(France)	José-Karl Pierre-Fanfan	31	2005	10	1	2008	Free	left on 31 August
25	MF	(Scotland)	Charlie Adam	21	2003	46	14	2009	Youth system	
26	DF	(Scotland)	Steven Smith	21	2002	49	1	2010	Youth system	
27	DF	(France)	Julien Rodriguez	28	2005	49	1	2009	£1m	left on 11 January
29	FW	(France)	William Stanger	21	2006	1	0	2008	Free	left on 8 February
30	MF	(Senegal)	Makhtar N'Diaye	25	2006	3	0	2007	Free	
31	MF	(Tunisia)	Hamed Namouchi	22	2003	51	6	2008	Free	left on 31 August
32	MF	(England)	Lee Martin	19	2006	10	0	2006	Loan	left on 29 December
41	DF	(Scotland)	Alan Lowing	19	2005	5	0	2008	Youth system	
42	FW	(Scotland)	Steven Lennon	19	2005	3	0		Youth system	
59	MF	(Scotland)	Andrew Shinnie	17	2006	2	0		Youth system	

- Last updated: 20 May 2007
- Source: Players transfer, Wikipedia players' articles,

Football Squads (for appearances, goals and player's number)

- Ordered by position on pitch.

=== Transfers ===
==== In ====
Date	Player	From	Fee
10 May 2006	(South Africa) Dean Furman	(England) Chelsea	Free
16 May 2006	(Czech Republic) Libor Sionko	Austria Wien	Bosman
23 May 2006	(France) William Stanger	(France) Rennes	Free
23 May 2006	(France) Antoine Ponroy	(France) Rennes	Free
26 May 2006	(Sweden) Karl Svensson	(Sweden) IFK Göteborg	£600,000
16 June 2006	(France) Lionel Letizi	(France) Paris Saint-Germain	Free
7 July 2006	(France) Jérémy Clément	(France) Olympique Lyonnais	£1,100,000
15 July 2006	(Senegal) Makhtar N'Diaye	(Switzerland) Yverdon-Sport	Free
15 July 2006	(Scotland) Rory Loy	(Scotland) Kilmarnock	£25,000
3 August 2006	(Slovenia) Filip Šebo	Austria Wien	£1,800,000
11 August 2006	(England) Lee Martin	(England) Manchester United	Loan
16 August 2006	(Scotland) Phil Bardsley	(England) Manchester United	Loan
31 August 2006	(Bosnia and Herzegovina) Saša Papac	Austria Wien	£450,000
5 January 2007	(Scotland) Andy Webster	(England) Wigan Athletic	Loan
16 January 2007	(Scotland) David Weir	(England) Everton	Free
25 January 2007	(England) Ugo Ehiogu	(England) Middlesbrough	Free
27 January 2007	(Denmark) Adda Djeziri	(Denmark) Frem	Loan
30 January 2007	(Scotland) Kevin Thomson	(Scotland) Hibernian	£2,000,000

==== Out ====
Date	Player	To	Fee
10 May 2006	(Greece) Sotirios Kyrgiakos	(Germany) Eintracht Frankfurt	Free
23 May 2006	(Denmark) Peter Løvenkrands	(Germany) Schalke 04	Free
24 May 2006	(Scotland) Alex Rae	(Scotland) Dundee	Free
7 June 2006	(Netherlands) Ronald Waterreus	(Netherlands) AZ Alkmaar	Free
13 June 2006	(Scotland) Gary MacKenzie	(Scotland) Dundee	Free
13 June 2006	(France) Marc Kalenga		End of contract
13 June 2006	(Scotland) Graeme Watson	(Scotland) Airdrie United	Free
13 June 2006	(Scotland) John Johnston		End of contract
13 June 2006	(Scotland) Jason Crooks	Ross County	End of contract
13 June 2006	(Scotland) Craig Frizzel	Ross County	End of contract
11 July 2006	(Scotland) Ross McCormack	Motherwell	Free
11 August 2006	(Netherlands) Fernando Ricksen	(Russia) Zenit Saint Petersburg	Loan
18 August 2006	(France) Dany N'Guessan	(England) Boston United	Loan
18 August 2006	(Scotland) Bob Davidson	(England) Boston United	Loan
31 August 2006	(Tunisia) Hamed Namouchi	(France) Lorient	£500,000
31 August 2006	(Scotland) Bob Malcolm	(Scotland) Derby County	Free
31 August 2006	(France) Olivier Bernard	(Scotland) Newcastle United	Free
31 August 2006	(France) José-Karl Pierre-Fanfan		Free
31 August 2006	(Trinidad and Tobago) Marvin Andrews		Free
29 November 2006	(Netherlands) Fernando Ricksen	(Russia) Zenit Saint Petersburg	£1,000,000
29 December 2006	(England) Lee Martin	(England) Manchester United	End of loan
29 December 2006	(Scotland) Phil Bardsley	(England) Manchester United	End of loan
1 January 2007	(England) Moses Ashikodi	(England) Watford	Nominal
11 January 2007	(France) Julien Rodriguez	(France) Marseille	Free
13 January 2007	(Scotland) Bob Davidson	(Scotland) Dundee	Free
19 January 2007	(Scotland) Derek Carcary	(Scotland) Raith Rovers	Free
23 January 2007	(France) Dany N'Guessan	(England) Lincoln City	Free
25 January 2007	(France) Jérémy Clément	(France) Paris Saint-Germain	£1,800,000
30 January 2007	(France) Lionel Letizi	(France) Nice	Free
8 February 2007	(France) William Stanger		Contract terminated
9 February 2007	(Scotland) Brian Gilmour	(Scotland) Clyde	Free

- Expenditure: ▼£5,975,000
- Income: ▲£3,300,000
- Total loss/gain: ▼£3,675,000

=== Squad statistics ===
				Total			Scottish Premier League		UEFA Cup		Scottish Cup		League Cup	
No.	Pos.	Nat.	Name	Sts	App	Gls	App	Gls	App	Gls	App	Gls	App	Gls
1	GK	(Germany)	Stefan Klos	1	2				2					
2	DF	(Scotland)	Andy Webster											
3	DF	(Scotland)	David Weir	18	18		14		4					
4	MF	(Belgium)	Thomas Buffel	14	25	4	17	3	5	1	1		2	
5	DF	(Bosnia and Herzegovina)	Saša Papac	21	23		21						2	
6	MF	(Scotland)	Barry Ferguson	41	41	7	32	4	8	3	1			
7	MF	(Algeria)	Brahim Hemdani	49	49	2	36	1	10	1	1		2	
8	MF	(France)	Jérémy Clément	22	23		19		3				1	
8	MF	(Scotland)	Kevin Thomson	11	11		8		3					
9	FW	(Croatia)	Dado Pršo	27	37	4	28	4	8				1	
10	FW	(Spain)	Nacho Novo	32	39	9	28	5	8	4	1		2	
11	MF	(Scotland)	Gavin Rae	10	20	1	10	1	7		1		2	
12	DF	(England)	Ugo Ehiogu	11	11	1	9	1	2					
14	MF	(Czech Republic)	Libor Sionko	17	24	3	18	3	5				1	
15	FW	(Scotland)	Kris Boyd	36	44	26	32	20	9	3	1	2	2	1
16	DF	(Scotland)	Phil Bardsley	7	7	1	5	1	2					
17	MF	(Scotland)	Chris Burke	14	29	2	22	2	5		1		1	
18	DF	(Scotland)	Ian Murray	18	18		13		4		1			
19	DF	(Sweden)	Karl Svensson	27	28		21		6		1			
20	DF	(Scotland)	Alan Hutton	43	44	2	33	1	8	1	1		2	
21	GK	(France)	Lionel Letizi	8	8		7		1					
22	GK	(Scotland)	Allan McGregor	42	42		31		8		1		2	
23	FW	(Slovakia)	Filip Šebo	7	33	2	24	2	7				2	
25	MF	(Scotland)	Charlie Adam	40	43	14	32	11	8	3	1		2	
26	DF	(Scotland)	Steven Smith	25	25	1	17	1	6				2	
27	DF	(France)	Julien Rodriguez	17	19		13		5		1			
29	FW	(France)	William Stanger		1				1					
30	MF	(Senegal)	Makhtar N'Diaye	1	3		1		2					
32	MF	(England)	Lee Martin	5	10		7		1				2	
41	DF	(Scotland)	Alan Lowing		1				1					
42	FW	(Scotland)	Steven Lennon		3		3							
59	MF	(Scotland)	Andrew Shinnie		2		2							

Last updated: 20 May 2007
Source: Soccerbase - Rangers 2006/2007 player appearances
Ordered by squad numbers
0 shown as blank

=== Goal scorers ===
N	P	Nat.	Name	League	Scottish Cup	League Cup	UEFA Cup	Total
15	FW	(Scotland)	Kris Boyd	20	2	1	3	26
11	MF	(Scotland)	Charlie Adam	11			3	14
10	FW	(Spain)	Nacho Novo	5			4	9
4	MF	(Belgium)	Thomas Buffel	3			1	4
9	FW	(Croatia)	Dado Pršo	4				4
14	MF	(Czech Republic)	Libor Sionko	3				3
7	MF	(Algeria)	Brahim Hemdani	1			1	2
17	MF	(Scotland)	Chris Burke	2				2
20	DF	(Scotland)	Alan Hutton	1			1	2
23	FW	(Slovakia)	Filip Šebo	2				2
12	DF	(England)	Ugo Ehiogu	1				1
11	MF	(Scotland)	Gavin Rae	1				1
16	DF	(Scotland)	Phil Bardsley	1				1
26	DF	(Scotland)	Steven Smith	1				1

Last updated: 20 May 2007
Source: Match reports
Only competitive matches

=== Disciplinary record ===
N	P	Nat.	Name	YC	Yellow card Red card	RC
3	DF	(Scotland)	David Weir	2		
4	MF	(Belgium)	Thomas Buffel	1		
5	DF	(Bosnia and Herzegovina)	Saša Papac	2		
6	MF	(Scotland)	Barry Ferguson	8		
7	MF	(Algeria)	Brahim Hemdani	1		
8	MF	(France)	Jérémy Clément	5		
8	MF	(Scotland)	Kevin Thomson	1		
9	FW	(Croatia)	Dado Pršo	6		1
10	FW	(Spain)	Nacho Novo	11		
11	MF	(Scotland)	Gavin Rae	1		
12	DF	(England)	Ugo Ehiogu	1		
15	FW	(Scotland)	Kris Boyd	6		
16	DF	(Scotland)	Phil Bardsley	2	1	
17	MF	(Scotland)	Chris Burke	3		
18	DF	(Scotland)	Ian Murray	3		
19	DF	(Sweden)	Karl Svensson	1		
20	DF	(Scotland)	Alan Hutton	11		
22	GK	(Scotland)	Allan McGregor	1		1
23	FW	(Slovakia)	Filip Šebo	2		
25	MF	(Scotland)	Charlie Adam	7		
26	DF	(Scotland)	Steven Smith	6		
27	DF	(France)	Julien Rodriguez	2		
32	MF	(Scotland)	Lee Martin	1		

Last updated: 20 May 2007
Source: Match reports
Only competitive matches

== Club ==
=== Board of directors ===
Position	Staff
Chairman	(Scotland) David Murray
Chief executive	(Scotland) Martin Bain
Finance director	(Scotland) David Jolliffe (until 23 May) (Scotland) Donald McIntyre (from 12 June)
Non-executive director	(Scotland) John Greig
Non-executive director	(Scotland) Alastair Johnston
Non-executive director	(Scotland) John McClelland
Non-executive director	(Scotland) Dave King
Non-executive director	(Scotland) Donald Wilson

Source: Wikipedia article

=== Coaching staff ===
Position	Staff
Manager	(France) Paul Le Guen (until 4 January) (Scotland) Ian Durrant (from 4 January) (until 10 January) (Scotland) Walter Smith (from 10 January)
Assistant manager	(France) Yves Colleu (until 4 January) (Scotland) Ally McCoist (from 10 January)
First-team coach	(Scotland) Kenny McDowall (from 10 January)
Fitness coach	(France) Stephane Wiertelak (until 4 January) (Wales) Adam Owen (from March)
Goalkeepers coach	(Scotland) Billy Thomson

Source: Wikipedia article

=== Other staff ===
Position	Staff
Head of Football Administration	(Scotland) Andrew Dickson
Head of Youth Development	(Scotland) Craig Mulholland
Physiotherapist	(France) Joel Le Hir (until 4 January) (Scotland) Davie Henderson
Doctor	(Scotland) Dr Ian McGuiness (until 9 January) (Scotland) Dr Paul Jackson
Chief scout	(Scotland) Ewan Chester (from 4 May)
Massuer	(Scotland) David Lavery
Kit controller	(Scotland) Jimmy Bell
Video analyst	(Scotland) Steve Harvey

Source: Wikipedia article

== Matches ==
=== Pre-season and friendlies ===
Game	Date	Tournament	Round	Ground	Opponent	Score^{1}	Report
1	6 July 2006	Friendly		A	(Northern Ireland) Linfield	2–0	Report / Report link; Kick off / TBC BST; Attendance / 10,988; Linfield / Rangers; / 13' Buffel; 24' Boyd
2	11 July 2006	Friendly		A	(South Africa) Jomo Select	4–0	Report / Report link; Kick off / TBC BST; Jomo Select / Rangers; / 10' Adam; 12' Adam; 27' Adam; 68' Boyd
3	14 July 2006	Friendly		AR	(South Africa) Jomo Cosmos	2–0	Report / Report link; Kick off / TBC BST; Jomo Cosmos / Rangers; / 3' Boyd; 68' Rae
4	16 July 2006	Friendly		AR	(South Africa) Mamelodi Sundowns	0–2	Report / Report link; Kick off / TBC BST; Mamelodi Sundowns / Rangers; 21' Moriri; 47' Correa; (yellow card) 68' (red card) Johannes
5	22 July 2006	Friendly		H	(England) Middlesbrough	1–0	Report / Report link; Kick off / 15:00 BST; Attendance / 31,544; Referee / (Scotland) Craig Thomson; Rangers / Middlesbrough; 45' Buffel
6	1 August 2006	Friendly		A	Dundee	1–0	Report / Report link; Kick off / TBC BST; Dundee / Rangers; 70' Boyd
7	23 August 2006	Friendly		H	(Russia) Zenit	1–4	Report / Report link; Kick off / 19:45 BST; Attendance / 30,019; Referee / (Scotland) Iain Brines; Rangers / Zenit St. Petersburg; 54' Rae / 19' Ho; 52' Denisov; 81' Kerzhakov; 90' Spivak
8	23 May 2007	Friendly		A	(United States) LA Galaxy	1–0	Report / Report link; Kick off / 19:30 PDT; Attendance / 15,259; LA Galaxy / Rangers; / 55' Boyd

Last updated: 23 May 2007
^{1}Rangers goals come first.
National flags for Ground and Opponent columns are only shown when different from that of Rangers.
M = Match; Ground: H = Home, A = Away, N = Neutral, HR = Home replacement, AR = Away replacement.

=== Scottish Premier League ===
Game	Date	Tournament	Round	Ground	Opponent	Score^{1}	Report
1	30 July 2006	Scottish Premier League	1	A	Motherwell	2–1	Report / Report link; Kick off / 14:00 BST; Attendance / 11,745; Referee / John Underhill (Scotland); Motherwell / Rangers; 52' O'Donnell / 8' Sionko; 65' Pršo
2	5 August 2006	Scottish Premier League	2	H	Dundee United	2–2	Report / Report link; Kick off / 15:00 BST; Attendance / 50,394; Referee / Dougie McDonald (Scotland); Rangers / Dundee United; 57' Burke; 79' (o.g.) Robb / 15' Hunt; 56' Kalvenes
3	13 August 2006	Scottish Premier League	3	A	Dunfermline Athletic	1–1	Report / Report link; Kick off / 14:00 BST; Attendance / 8,561; Referee / Charlie Richmond (Scotland); Dunfermline Athletic / Rangers; 69' Morrison / 63' Buffel
4	19 August 2006	Scottish Premier League	4	H	Heart of Midlothian	2–0	Report / Report link; Kick off / 15:00 BST; Attendance / 50,239; Referee / Kenny Clark (Scotland); Rangers / Heart of Midlothian; 47' (pen.) Boyd; 49' Boyd / (yellow card) 90' (red card) Neilson
5	27 August 2006	Scottish Premier League	5	A	Kilmarnock	2–2	Report / Report link; Kick off / 14:00 BST; Attendance / 13,506; Referee / Alan Freeland (Scotland); Kilmarnock / Rangers; 63' Wright; 90' (pen.) Naismith / 43' Boyd; 85' Boyd
6	9 September 2006	Scottish Premier League	6	H	Falkirk	4–0	Report / Report link; Kick off / 15:00 BST; Attendance / 50,196; Referee / Stuart Dougal (Scotland); Rangers / Falkirk; 17' Bardsley; 28' Pršo; 68' (pen.) Boyd; 78' Buffel
8	17 September 2006	Scottish Premier League	7	A	Hibernian	1–2	Report / Report link; Kick off / 14:00 BST; Attendance / 16,450; Referee / John Underhill (Scotland); Hibernian / Rangers; 8' Killen; 81' Killen; (yellow card) 88' (red card) Killen / 65' Šebo; (yellow card) 90' (red card) Bardsley
10	23 September 2006	Scottish Premier League	8	A	Celtic	0–2	Report / Report link; Kick off / 12:30 BST; Attendance / 59,341; Referee / Dougie McDonald (Scotland); Celtic / Rangers; 35' Gravesen; 74' Miller
12	1 October 2006	Scottish Premier League	9	H	Aberdeen	1–0	Report / Report link; Kick off / 15:00 BST; Attendance / 50,488; Referee / Charlie Richmond (Scotland); Rangers / Aberdeen; 88' Šebo
13	14 October 2006	Scottish Premier League	10	H	Inverness Caledonian Thistle	0–1	Report / Report link; Kick off / 15:00 BST; Attendance / 49,494; Referee / Iain Brines (Scotland); Rangers / Inverness Caledonian Thistle; / 57' Bayne
15	22 October 2006	Scottish Premier League	11	A	St Mirren	3–2	Report / Report link; Kick off / 14:00 BST; Attendance / 8,384; Referee / Calum Murray (Scotland); St Mirren / Rangers; 5' Sutton; 78' (pen.) Sutton / 18' Adam; 26' Buffel; 85' Novo
16	28 October 2006	Scottish Premier League	12	H	Motherwell	1–1	Report / Report link; Kick off / 15:00 BST; Attendance / 49,785; Referee / Charlie Richmond (Scotland); Rangers / Motherwell; 36' Boyd / 50' Kerr
18	5 November 2006	Scottish Premier League	13	A	Dundee United	1–2	Report / Report link; Kick off / 14:00 GMT; Attendance / 10,392; Referee / Kenny Clark (Scotland); Dundee United / Rangers; 77' Kenneth; 82' Mair / 50' Adam
20	11 November 2006	Scottish Premier League	14	H	Dunfermline Athletic	2–0	Report / Report link; Kick off / 15:00 GMT; Attendance / 48,218; Referee / Steve Conroy (Scotland); Rangers / Dunfermline Athletic; 61' Boyd; 77' Smith
21	19 November 2006	Scottish Premier League	15	A	Heart of Midlothian	1–0	Report / Report link; Kick off / 14:00 GMT; Attendance / 17,040; Referee / Dougie McDonald (Scotland); Heart of Midlothian / Rangers; / 78' Novo
23	26 November 2006	Scottish Premier League	16	H	Kilmarnock	3–0	Report / Report link; Kick off / 15:00 GMT; Attendance / 48,289; Referee / Kenny Clark (Scotland); Rangers / Kilmarnock; 23' Adam; 28' Boyd; 58' Pršo
24	3 December 2006	Scottish Premier League	17	A	Falkirk	0–1	Report / Report link; Kick off / 14:00 GMT; Attendance / 7,245; Referee / Stuart Dougal (Scotland); Falkirk / Rangers; 26' Twaddle
25	9 December 2006	Scottish Premier League	18	H	Hibernian	3–0	Report / Report link; Kick off / 15:00 GMT; Attendance / 49,702; Referee / Iain Brines (Scotland); Rangers / Hibernian; 16' Pršo; 32' Sionko; 36' Ferguson / (yellow card) 67' (red card) Sproule
27	17 December 2006	Scottish Premier League	19	H	Celtic	1–1	Report / Report link; Kick off / 12:30 GMT; Attendance / 50,418; Referee / Kenny Clark (Scotland); Rangers / Celtic; 88' Hemdani / 38' Gravesen
28	23 December 2006	Scottish Premier League	20	A	Aberdeen	2–1	Report / Report link; Kick off / 12:30 GMT; Attendance / 20,045; Referee / Dougie McDonald (Scotland); Rangers / Aberdeen; 22' Novo; 24' Sionko / 84' Lovell
29	27 December 2006	Scottish Premier League	21	A	Inverness Caledonian Thistle	1–2	Report / Report link; Kick off / 20:00 GMT; Attendance / 7,522; Referee / Craig Thomson (Scotland); Inverness Caledonian Thistle / Rangers; 41' Dods; 90' Rankin / 22' (pen.) Novo
30	30 December 2006	Scottish Premier League	22	H	St Mirren	1–1	Report / Report link; Kick off / 15:00 GMT; Attendance / 50,273; Referee / Eddie Smith (Scotland); Rangers / St Mirren; 19' Boyd / 14' Brittain
31	2 January 2007	Scottish Premier League	23	A	Motherwell	1–0	Report / Report link; Kick off / 15:00 GMT; Attendance / 10,338; Referee / Mike McCurry (Scotland); Motherwell / Rangers; (red card) 73' Fitzpatrick / 70' (pen.) Boyd; (red card) 73' Pršo
33	13 January 2007	Scottish Premier League	24	H	Dundee United	5–0	Report / Report link; Kick off / 15:00 GMT; Attendance / 50,276; Referee / Craig MacKay (Scotland); Rangers / Dundee United; 23' Adam; 35' Burke; 59' Boyd; 68' Boyd; 88' Ferguson
34	21 January 2007	Scottish Premier League	25	A	Dunfermline Athletic	1–0	Report / Report link; Kick off / 14:00 GMT; Attendance / 7,868; Referee / John Underhill (Scotland); Dunfermline Athletic / Rangers; / 9' Adam
35	27 January 2007	Scottish Premier League	26	A	Heart of Midlothian	0–0	Report / Report link; Kick off / 15:00 GMT; Attendance / 50,321; Referee / Charlie Richmond (Scotland)
36	11 February 2007	Scottish Premier League	27	A	Kilmarnock	3–1	Report / Report link; Kick off / 14:00 GMT; Attendance / 11,894; Referee / Dougie McDonald (Scotland); Kilmarnock / Rangers; 73' Naismith / 9' (pen.) Boyd; 30' Boyd; 60' (pen.) Boyd
38	18 February 2007	Scottish Premier League	28	H	Falkirk	2–1	Report / Report link; Kick off / 15:00 GMT; Attendance / 49,850; Referee / Stuart Dougal (Scotland); Rangers / Falkirk; 34' Boyd; 73' Ferguson / 64' Finnigan; (red card) 82' Scobbie
40	4 March 2007	Scottish Premier League	29	A	Hibernian	2–0	Report / Report link; Kick off / 14:00 GMT; Attendance / 16,265; Referee / Charlie Richmond (Scotland); Hibernian / Rangers; / 4' Adam; 60' Adam
42	11 March 2007	Scottish Premier League	30	A	Celtic	1–0	Report / Report link; Kick off / 12:30 GMT; Attendance / 59,425; Referee / Stuart Dougal (Scotland); Celtic / Rangers; / 50' Ehiogu
44	17 March 2007	Scottish Premier League	31	H	Aberdeen	3–0	Report / Report link; Kick off / 15:00 GMT; Attendance / 50,354; Referee / Mike McCurry (Scotland); Rangers / Aberdeen; 8' Boyd; 25' Boyd; 31' Boyd
45	31 March 2007	Scottish Premier League	32	H	Inverness Caledonian Thistle	1–1	Report / Report link; Kick off / 15:00 GMT; Attendance / 50,278; Referee / William Collum (Scotland); Rangers / Inverness Caledonian Thistle; 15' Adam / (red card) 14' Dods; 82' Dargo
46	8 April 2007	Scottish Premier League	33	A	St Mirren	1–0	Report / Report link; Kick off / 14:00 GMT; Attendance / 7,308; Referee / Charlie Richmond (Scotland); St Mirren / Rangers; / 4' Novo
47	21 April 2007	Scottish Premier League	34	H	Heart of Midlothian	2–1	Report / Report link; Kick off / 15:00 GMT; Attendance / 50,099; Referee / Iain Brines (Scotland); Rangers / Heart of Midlothian; 52' Rae; 79' Ferguson / 16' Velička
48	28 April 2007	Scottish Premier League	35	A	Hibernian	3–3	Report / Report link; Kick off / 15:00 GMT; Attendance / 16,747; Referee / Charlie Richmond (Scotland); Hibernian / Rangers; 20' Fletcher; 45' McCann; 62' Whittaker; (yellow card) 90' (red card) Beuzelin / 24' Adam; 54' Hutton; 78' Adam
49	5 May 2007	Scottish Premier League	36	H	Celtic	2–0	Report / Report link; Kick off / 12:30 GMT; Attendance / 50,384; Referee / Craig Thomson (Scotland); Rangers / Celtic; 34' Boyd; 55' Adam
50	13 May 2007	Scottish Premier League	37	H	Kilmarnock	0–1	Report / Report link; Kick off / 14:00 GMT; Attendance / 50,085; Referee / Iain Brines (Scotland); Rangers / Kilmarnock; / 53' Naismith
51	20 May 2007	Scottish Premier League	38	A	Aberdeen	0–2	Report / Report link; Kick off / 14:00 GMT; Attendance / 20,010; Referee / Craig Thomson (Scotland); Aberdeen / Rangers; 21' Severin; 32' Lovell

Last updated: 20 May 2007
Source: Wikipedia article
^{1}Rangers goals come first.
National flags for Ground and Opponent columns are only shown when different from that of Rangers.
M = Match; Ground: H = Home, A = Away, N = Neutral, HR = Home replacement, AR = Away replacement.

=== Scottish League Cup ===
Game

Date

Tournament

Round

Ground

Opponent

Score^{1}

Report

9
20 September 2006
League Cup
3
A
Dunfermline Athletic
2–0

Report	Report link
Kick off	19:45 BST
Attendance	5,702
Referee	Mike McCurry (Scotland)
Dunfermline Athletic	Rangers
	65' (o.g.) Bamba; 73' Boyd

19
8 November 2006
League Cup
QF
H
St Johnstone
0–2

Report	Report link
Kick off	19:45 GMT
Attendance	31,074
Referee	Stuart Dougal (Scotland)
Rangers	St Johnstone
	52' Milne; 68' Milne

Last updated: 8 November 2006
Source: Wikipedia article
^{1}Rangers goals come first.
National flags for Ground and Opponent columns are only shown when different from that of Rangers.
M = Match; Ground: H = Home, A = Away, N = Neutral, HR = Home replacement, AR = Away replacement.

=== Scottish Cup ===
Game

32
Date

7 January 2007
Tournament

Scottish Cup
Round

3
Ground

A
Opponent

Dunfermline Athletic
Score^{1}

2–3
Report

Report	Report link
Kick off	12:15 GMT
Attendance	7,231
Referee	Iain Brines (Scotland)
Dunfermline Athletic	Rangers
17' Hamilton; 29' Simmons; 46' McGuire	54' Boyd; 68' Boyd

Last updated: 7 January 2007
Source: Wikipedia article
^{1}Rangers goals come first.
National flags for Ground and Opponent columns are only shown when different from that of Rangers.
M = Match; Ground: H = Home, A = Away, N = Neutral, HR = Home replacement, AR = Away replacement.

=== UEFA Cup ===
Game	Date	Tournament	Round	Ground	Opponent	Score^{1}	Report
7	14 September 2006	UEFA Cup	1	A	(Norway) Molde	0–0	Report / Report link; Kick off / 19:05 BST; Attendance / 6,569; Referee / (Poland) Jacek Granat
11	28 September 2006	UEFA Cup	1	H	(Norway) Molde	2–0	Report / Report link; Kick off / 19:45 BST; Attendance / 48,024; Referee / (Germany) Knut Kircher; Rangers / Molde; 12' Buffel; 45' Ferguson
14	19 October 2006	UEFA Cup	GS	A	(Italy) Livorno	3–2	Report / Report link; Kick off / 19:45 BST; Attendance / 13,200; Referee / (Spain) Julian Rodriguez Santiago; Livorno / Rangers; 34' (pen.) Lucarelli; 90' Lucarelli / 27' Adam; 30' (pen.) Boyd; 35' Novo
17	2 November 2006	UEFA Cup	GS	H	(Israel) Maccabi Haifa	2–0	Report / Report link; Kick off / 19:45 GMT; Attendance / 43,062; Referee / (Cyprus) Costas Kapitanis; Rangers / Maccabi Haifa; 5' Novo; 89' (pen.) Adam
22	23 November 2006	UEFA Cup	GS	A	(France) Auxerre	2–2	Report / Report link; Kick off / 18:30 GMT; Attendance / 8,305; Referee / (Sweden) Jonas Eriksson; Auxerre / Rangers; 31' Jeleń; 75' Niculae / 62' Novo; 84' Boyd
26	14 December 2006	UEFA Cup	GS	H	(Serbia) Partizan	1–0	Report / Report link; Kick off / 19:45 GMT; Attendance / 45,129; Referee / (Netherlands) Ruud Bossen; Rangers / Partizan; 55' Hutton
37	14 February 2007	UEFA Cup	3	A	(Israel) Hapoel Tel Aviv	1–2	Report / Report link; Kick off / 19:05 GMT; Attendance / 13,000; Referee / (Portugal) Pedro Oliveira Alves Garcia; Hapoel Tel Aviv / Rangers; 43' Toama; 76' Dago / 53' Novo
39	22 February 2007	UEFA Cup	3	H	(Israel) Hapoel Tel Aviv	4–0	Report / Report link; Kick off / 20:05 GMT; Attendance / 46,213; Referee / (Italy) Matteo Trefoloni; Rangers / Hapoel Tel Aviv; 24' Ferguson; 35' Boyd; 73' Ferguson; (red card) 74' McGregor; 90' Adam
41	8 March 2007	UEFA Cup	4	H	(Spain) Osasuna	1–1	Report / Report link; Kick off / 19:45 GMT; Attendance / 50,290; Referee / (Netherlands) Jan Wegereef; Rangers / Osasuna; 90' Hemdani / 17' Raúl García
43	14 March 2007	UEFA Cup	4	A	(Spain) Osasuna	0–1	Report / Report link; Kick off / 19:45 GMT; Attendance / 19,126; Referee / (Denmark) Claus Bo Larsen; Osasuna / Rangers; 71' Webó

Last updated: 14 March 2007
Source: Wikipedia article
^{1}Rangers goals come first.
National flags for Ground and Opponent columns are only shown when different from that of Rangers.
M = Match; Ground: H = Home, A = Away, N = Neutral, HR = Home replacement, AR = Away replacement.

== Competitions ==
=== Overall ===
Competition	Started round	Final position / round	First match	Last match
Scottish Premier League	—	2nd	30 July	20 May
UEFA Cup	1st round	Round of 16	14 September	14 March
League Cup	3rd round	Quarter-finals	20 September	8 November
Scottish Cup	3rd round	3rd round	7 January	

Source: Competitions

=== Scottish Premier League ===
==== Standings ====
Pos	Team	Pld	W	D	L	GF	GA	GD	Pts	Qualification or relegation (Note: Teams played each other three times (33 matches), before the league split into two groups (the top six and the bottom six) for the last five matches.)
1	Celtic (C)	38	26	6	6	65	34	+31	84	Qualification for the Champions League third qualifying round
2	Rangers	38	21	9	8	61	32	+29	72	Qualification for the Champions League second qualifying round
3	Aberdeen	38	19	8	11	55	38	+17	65	Qualification for the UEFA Cup first round
4	Heart of Midlothian	38	17	10	11	47	35	+12	61	
5	Kilmarnock	38	16	7	15	47	54	−7	55	

Source: Scottish Professional Football League
Rules for classification: 1) Points; 2) Goal difference; 3) Goals scored
(C) Champions

==== Results summary ====
Overall								Home						Away					
Pld	W	D	L	GF	GA	GD	Pts	W	D	L	GF	GA	GD	W	D	L	GF	GA	GD
38	21	9	8	61	32	+29	72	11	6	2	35	10	+25	10	3	6	26	22	+4

Last updated: 20 May 2007.
Source: Wikipedia article

==== Results by round ====
Round	1	2	3	4	5	6	7	8	9	10	11	12	13	14	15	16	17	18	19	20	21	22	23	24	25	26	27	28	29	30	31	32	33	34	35	36	37	38
Ground	A	H	A	H	A	H	A	A	H	H	A	H	A	H	A	H	A	H	H	A	A	H	A	H	A	H	A	H	A	A	H	H	A	H	A	H	H	A
Result	W	D	D	W	D	W	L	L	W	L	W	D	L	W	W	W	L	W	D	W	L	D	W	W	W	D	W	W	W	W	W	D	W	W	D	W	L	L

Updated to match(es) played on 20 May 2007. Source: 2006–07 Scottish Premier League
A = Away; H = Home; W = Win; D = Draw; L = Loss

=== UEFA Cup ===
==== Group A ====
Pos	Team	Pld	W	D	L	GF	GA	GD	Pts	Qualification	RAN	MHA	LIV	AUX	PTZ
1	(Scotland) Rangers	4	3	1	0	8	4	+4	10	Advance to knockout stage	—	2–0	—	—	1–0
2	(Israel) Maccabi Haifa	4	2	1	1	5	4	+1	7	Advance to knockout stage	—	—	—	3–1	1–0
3	(Italy) Livorno	4	1	2	1	5	5	0	5	Advance to knockout stage	2–3	1–1	—	—	—
4	(France) Auxerre	4	1	1	2	7	7	0	4		2–2	—	0–1	—	—
5	(Serbia) Partizan	4	0	1	3	2	7	−5	1		—	—	1–1	1–4	—
