= 2007–08 Rangers F.C. season =

Rangers
2007–08 season
- Chairman: David Murray
- Manager: Walter Smith
- Ground: Ibrox Stadium; Glasgow, Scotland (Capacity: 51,082)
- Scottish Premier League: 2nd
- Scottish Cup: Winners
- League Cup: Winners
- Champions League: Group stage
- UEFA Cup: Runners-up
- Top goalscorer: League: Kris Boyd (14); All: Kris Boyd (25)
- Highest home attendance: 50,440 vs Hibernian (6 October)
- Lowest home attendance: 33,837 vs Hibernian (9 March)
Home colours	Away colours	Third colours

The 2007–08 season was the 128th season of competitive football by Rangers.

== Overview ==
Rangers played a total of 68 competitive matches during the 2007–08 season. It was Walter Smith's first full season at the club since 1997–98. The early season priority was qualification for the group stages of the Champions League and this was secured with hard-fought victories over FK Zeta and Red Star Belgrade.

Rangers were drawn in Group E with Barcelona, Lyon and Stuttgart. The group stage started well, with the first two matches resulting in victories, over Stuttgart and Lyon. A home draw with Barcelona left Rangers with seven points after three games, but the last three matches all resulted in defeat, meaning Rangers finished third in the group and entered the UEFA Cup. However, the European adventure continued for Rangers as they progressed to the semi-finals of the competition by beating Panathinaikos, Werder Bremen and Sporting Lisbon. They then reached the final with a penalty shootout victory against Fiorentina. They played Zenit Saint Petersburg, managed by formed Gers boss Dick Advocaat, in Manchester on 14 May. Rangers lost the match 2–0, with over 200,000 fans in the city to see the game. When asked if the SFA should have extended the season to benefit Rangers, Ally McCoist said: "They were a disgrace. It was embarrassing. I think the Russian federation cancelled Zenit's three or four games previously. I think we played something like eight games in eighteen days. It might just sound like sour grapes, but no: any other country in the planet, the association would have helped the team. If you're asking me if it was wrong, it was completely and utterly wrong."

While the league season was extended by four days until Thursday 22 May. over the course of the season Rangers had a total of three domestic league games postponed, which in conjunction with the European run led to severe fixture congestion. The first was to support the national team's bid to qualify for Euro 2008, another was to aid Rangers European campaign, and the third an agreement to cancel an Old Firm derby following the sudden death of former Celtic player Phil O'Donnell. However, Celtic played on without postponement after coach and club legend Tommy Burns passed away toward the end of the campaign.

On the domestic front, the race for the Scottish Premier League continued until the final matchday of the season. Both Celtic and Rangers were tied on 86 points going into their games (against Dundee United and Aberdeen respectively) on 22 May 2008, but Celtic were top of the table due to having a +57 goal differential, six ahead of Rangers. This did not prove to be decisive, as Celtic beat Dundee United 1–0 while Rangers surrendered their hopes of landing the championship with a 2–0 defeat away to the Dons. The club had had a ten-point lead in late March, although their nearest rivals, Celtic, had games in hand at the time. However having to play four competitive matches (including a UEFA Cup Final) in the last eight days of the season proved just too much of a problem for Rangers to overcome.

The club appeared in its first final since 2005. They played Dundee United on 16 March 2008 and won the League Cup on penalties. The match was tied 2-2 after extra time, with both goals coming from Kris Boyd who also scored the winning spot kick.

They also reached the final of the Scottish Cup for the 49th time. They beat St Johnstone 4–3 on penalties in the semi-final after the score was tied at 1-1 after extra time. The club played Queen of the South in the final on 24 May 2008 and won the match 3-2 thanks to goals from DaMarcus Beasley and a double from Kris Boyd.

== Players ==
=== Squad information ===
N	Pos.	Nat.	Name	Age	Since	App	Goals	Ends	Transfer fee	Notes
1	GK	(Scotland)	Allan McGregor	26	1998	106	0	2010	Youth system	
2	DF	(Scotland)	Alan Hutton	23	2000	122	4	2012	Youth system	left on 30 January
3	DF	(Scotland)	David Weir	38	2007 (Winter)	79	3	2008	Free	
4	MF	(Belgium)	Thomas Buffel	27	2005 (Winter)	86	16	2009	£2.3m	
5	DF	(Bosnia and Herzegovina)	Saša Papac	28	2006	69	0	2009	£0.45m	
6	MF	(Scotland)	Barry Ferguson (captain)	30	2005 (Winter)	404	59	2010	£4.5m	
7	MF	(Algeria)	Brahim Hemdani	30	2005	108	2	2009	Free	
8	MF	(Scotland)	Kevin Thomson	23	2007 (Winter)	56	1	2011	£2m	
9	FW	(Scotland)	Kris Boyd	24	2005 (Winter)	106	71	2010	£0.4m	
10	FW	(Spain)	Nacho Novo	29	2004	168	54	2010	£0.45m	
11	MF	(Scotland)	Charlie Adam	22	2003	78	18	2012	Youth system	
12	DF	(England)	Ugo Ehiogu	35	2007 (Winter)	12	1	2008	Free	left on 18 January
12	MF	(Northern Ireland)	Steven Davis	23	2008 (Winter)	26	1	2008	Loan	
14	MF	(Senegal)	Amdy Faye	31	2007	6	0	2008	Loan	
15	MF	(Scotland)	Alan Gow	25	2007	2	0	2010	Free	
16	GK	(Scotland)	Graeme Smith	25	2007	1	0	2010	Free	
17	MF	(Scotland)	Chris Burke	24	2000	129	14	2009	Youth system	
18	DF	(Scotland)	Ian Murray	26	2005	60	0	2008	Free	left on 24 August
18	FW	(Scotland)	Steven Naismith	21	2008	31	5	2012	£1.9m	
19	FW	(France)	Jean-Claude Darcheville	32	2007	48	15	2009	Free	
20	MF	(United States)	DaMarcus Beasley	26	2007	21	5	2010	£0.7m	
21	DF	(Scotland)	Kirk Broadfoot	23	2007	34	1	2010	Free	
22	DF	(Scotland)	Andy Webster	26	2008	1	1	2011	£0.4m	
23	FW	(Slovakia)	Filip Šebo	24	2006	34	2	2010	£1.8m	out on season long loan
23	DF	(Scotland)	Christian Dailly	34	2008 (Winter)	22	2	2008	Free	
24	CB	(Spain)	Carlos Cuéllar	26	2007	65	5	2011	£2.37m	
25	GK	(Northern Ireland)	Roy Carroll	30	2007	1	0	2008	Free	left on 31 January
25	GK	(Scotland)	Neil Alexander	30	2008 (Winter)	15	0	2011	Free	
26	DF	(Scotland)	Steven Smith	22	2002	51	1	2010	Youth system	
27	MF	(Scotland)	Lee McCulloch	30	2007	46	7	2011	£2.25m	
28	DF	(Scotland)	Steven Whittaker	23	2007	48	5	2012	£2m	
29	FW	(Gabon)	Daniel Cousin	31	2007	42	12	2010	£1.1m	
34	MF	(Scotland)	Paul Emslie	20	2005	1	0	2010	Youth system	
36	MF	(South Africa)	Dean Furman	19	2006	1	0	2008	Free	
43	MF	(Scotland)	John Fleck	16	2007	3	0	2011	Youth system	

- Last updated: 24 May 2008
- Source: Football Squads (for appearances, goals and player's number)
- Ordered by squad numbers.

=== Transfers ===
==== In ====
Date	Player	From	Fee
22 May 2007	(Scotland) Alan Gow	(Scotland) Falkirk	Free
29 May 2007	(Cyprus) Georgios Efrem	(England) Arsenal	Free
27 June 2007	(Scotland) Graeme Smith	(Scotland) Kilmarnock	Free
27 June 2007	(United States) DaMarcus Beasley	(Netherlands) PSV Eindhoven	£700,000
27 June 2007	(Scotland) Kirk Broadfoot	(Scotland) St Mirren	Free
27 June 2007	(France) Jean-Claude Darcheville	(France) Bordeaux	Free
29 June 2007	(Scotland) Andy Webster	(England) Wigan Athletic	Loan
6 July 2007	(Spain) Carlos Cuéllar	(Spain) Osasuna	£2,370,000
7 July 2007	(Northern Ireland) Roy Carroll	(England) West Ham United	Free
10 July 2007	(Austria) Marco Michetschlager	(Austria) Admira Wacker Mödling	Loan
11 July 2007	(Scotland) Lee McCulloch	(England) Wigan Athletic	£2,250,000
1 August 2007	(Scotland) Steven Whittaker	(Scotland) Hibernian	£2,000,000
9 August 2007	(Gabon) Daniel Cousin	(France) RC Lens	£1,100,000
31 August 2007	(Norway) Thomas Kind Bendiksen	(Norway) Harstad IL	£90,000
31 August 2007	(Senegal) Amdy Faye	(England) Charlton Athletic	Loan
31 August 2007	(Scotland) Steven Naismith	(Scotland) Kilmarnock	£1,900,000
30 January 2008	(Scotland) Neil Alexander	(England) Ipswich Town	Free
31 January 2008	(Scotland) Christian Dailly	(England) West Ham United	Free
31 January 2008	(Northern Ireland) Steven Davis	(England) Fulham	Loan

==== Out ====
Date	Player	To	Fee
1 June 2007	(Scotland) Steven Campbell		Free
1 June 2007	(Senegal) Makhtar N'Diaye		Free
1 June 2007	(France) Antoine Ponroy		Free
1 June 2007	(Germany) Stefan Klos		Retired
1 June 2007	(Croatia) Dado Pršo		Retired
22 June 2007	(Scotland) Gavin Rae	(Wales) Cardiff City	Free
10 July 2007	(England) Lee Robinson	(Scotland) Greenock Morton	Loan
20 July 2007	(Scotland) Brian Gilmour	(Scotland) Queen of the South	Free
27 July 2007	(Sweden) Karl Svensson	(France) Caen	£700,000
1 August 2007	(Czech Republic) Libor Sionko	(Denmark) Copenhagen	£90,000
22 August 2007	(Slovenia) Filip Šebo	(France) Valenciennes	Loan
24 August 2007	(Scotland) Ian Murray	(England) Norwich City	Free
18 January 2008	(England) Ugo Ehiogu	(England) Sheffield United	Free
30 January 2008	(Scotland) Alan Hutton	(England) Tottenham Hotspur	£9,000,000
31 January 2008	(Northern Ireland) Roy Carroll	(England) Derby County	Free

- Expenditure: ▼£10,410,000
- Income: ▲£9,790,000
- Total loss/gain: ▼£620,000

=== Squad statistics ===
				Total			Scottish Premier League		UEFA Champions League		UEFA Cup		Scottish Cup		League Cup	
No.	Pos.	Nat.	Name	Sts	App	Gls	App	Gls	App	Gls	App	Gls	App	Gls	App	Gls
1	GK	(Scotland)	Allan McGregor	53	53		31		10		6		3		3	
2	RB	(Scotland)	Alan Hutton	31	31	1	20		9				1	1	1	
3	CB	(Scotland)	David Weir	61	61	3	37	2	10	1	8		3		3	
4	AM	(Belgium)	Thomas Buffel		5		1				1		2		1	
5	LB	(Bosnia and Herzegovina)	Saša Papac	46	46		22		9		9		3		3	
6	CM	(Scotland)	Barry Ferguson	61	62	9	38	7	10	1	8		3		3	1
7	CM	(Algeria)	Brahim Hemdani	35	35		12		9		9		3		2	
8	CM	(Scotland)	Kevin Thomson	43	44	1	26	1	8		4		5		1	
9	CF	(Scotland)	Kris Boyd	25	41	25	28	14	2		2		6	6	3	5
10	CF	(Spain)	Nacho Novo	18	49	16	28	10	7	1	7	1	4	2	3	2
11	LM	(Scotland)	Charlie Adam	25	32	4	16	2	7	2	4		3		2	
12	CM	(Northern Ireland)	Steven Davis	23	26	1	12				9	1	4		1	
12	CB	(England)	Ugo Ehiogu	1	1										1	
14	CM	(Senegal)	Amdy Faye	3	6		4		1						1	
15	AM	(Scotland)	Alan Gow	2	2								1		1	
16	GK	(Scotland)	Graeme Smith	1	1								1			
17	RW	(Scotland)	Chris Burke	17	21	4	11	2			2		5	2	3	
18	CF	(Scotland)	Steven Naismith	17	31	5	21	5	3		1		6			
19	CF	(France)	Jean-Claude Darcheville	28	48	15	30	12	8	1	5	1	3		2	1
20	LW	(United States)	DaMarcus Beasley	15	21	5	11	2	8	2			1	1	1	
21	RB	(Scotland)	Kirk Broadfoot	31	34	1	15	1	9		3		5		2	
22	CB	(Scotland)	Andy Webster	1	1	1	1	1								
23	CB	(Scotland)	Christian Dailly	21	22	2	12	2			5		4		1	
23	CF	(Slovakia)	Filip Šebo		1				1							
24	CB	(Spain)	Carlos Cuéllar	65	65	5	36	4	10		9		6		4	1
25	GK	(Northern Ireland)	Roy Carroll	1	1										1	
25	GK	(Scotland)	Neil Alexander	13	15		8				3		4			
26	LB	(Scotland)	Steven Smith	2	2								2			
27	MF	(Scotland)	Lee McCulloch	38	46	7	22	3	9	2	6		6	2	3	
28	RB	(Scotland)	Steven Whittaker	43	48	5	30	4	4		5	1	6		3	
29	CF	(Gabon)	Daniel Cousin	26	42	12	26	10	7	1	5	1	2		2	
34	CM	(Scotland)	Paul Emslie		1										1	
36	CM	(South Africa)	Dean Furman		1		1									
43	AM	(Scotland)	John Fleck		3		1						2			

Last updated: 24 May 2008
Source: Soccerbase - Rangers 2007/2008 player appearances
Ordered by squad numbers
0 shown as blank

=== Top Scorer ===
N	P	Nat.	Name	SPL	SC	SLC	E	Total
9	FW	(Scotland)	Kris Boyd	14	6	5		25
10	FW	(Spain)	Nacho Novo	10	2	2	2	16
19	FW	(France)	Jean-Claude Darcheville	12		1	2	15
29	FW	(Gabon)	Daniel Cousin	10			2	12
6	MF	(Scotland)	Barry Ferguson	7		1	1	9
27	MF	(Scotland)	Lee McCulloch	3	2		2	7
18	FW	(Scotland)	Steven Naismith	5				5
20	MF	(United States)	Damarcus Beasley	2	1		2	5
24	DF	(Spain)	Carlos Cuéllar	4		1		5
28	DF	(Scotland)	Steven Whittaker	4			1	5
11	MF	(Scotland)	Charlie Adam	2			2	4
17	MF	(Scotland)	Chris Burke	2	2			4
3	DF	(Scotland)	David Weir	2			1	3
23	DF	(Scotland)	Christian Dailly	2				2
22	DF	(Scotland)	Andy Webster	1				1
21	DF	(Scotland)	Kirk Broadfoot	1				1
8	MF	(Scotland)	Kevin Thomson	1				1
12	MF	(Northern Ireland)	Steven Davis				1	1
2	DF	(Scotland)	Alan Hutton		1			1
			Own goal	2				2

Last updated: 24 May 2008
Source: Match reports
Only competitive matches

=== Disciplinary record ===
N	P	Nat.	Name	YC	Yellow card Red card	RC
1	GK	(Scotland)	Allan McGregor	2		1
2	DF	(Scotland)	Alan Hutton	13	1	
3	DF	(Scotland)	David Weir	3		
5	DF	(Bosnia and Herzegovina)	Saša Papac	2		
6	MF	(Scotland)	Barry Ferguson	2		
7	MF	(Algeria)	Brahim Hemdani	2		
8	MF	(Scotland)	Kevin Thomson	10		
9	FW	(Scotland)	Kris Boyd	2		
10	FW	(Spain)	Nacho Novo	2		2
11	MF	(Scotland)	Charlie Adam	4		
14	MF	(Senegal)	Amdy Faye	1		
17	MF	(Scotland)	Chris Burke	3		
18	FW	(Scotland)	Steven Naismith	2		
19	FW	(France)	Jean-Claude Darcheville	1		1
20	MF	(United States)	Damarcus Beasley	2		
21	DF	(Scotland)	Kirk Broadfoot	5		
23	DF	(Scotland)	Christian Dailly	3		
24	DF	(Spain)	Carlos Cuéllar	6		1
27	MF	(Scotland)	Lee McCulloch	7		1
28	DF	(Scotland)	Steven Whittaker	4	1	
29	FW	(Gabon)	Daniel Cousin	1	1	

Last updated: 24 May 2008
Source: Match reports
Only competitive matches

== Club ==
=== Board of directors ===
Position	Staff
Chairman	(Scotland) David Murray
Chief Executive	(Scotland) Martin Bain
Finance Director	(Scotland) Donald McIntyre
Non-Executive Director	(Scotland) John Greig
Non-Executive Director	(Scotland) Alastair Johnston
Non-Executive Director	(Scotland) John McClelland
Non-Executive Director	(Scotland) Dave King
Non-Executive Director	(Scotland) Donald Wilson
Non-Executive Director	(Scotland) Paul Murray (from 20 September)

Source: Wikipedia

=== Coaching staff ===
Position	Staff
Manager	(Scotland) Walter Smith
Assistant Manager	(Scotland) Ally McCoist
First-team coach	(Scotland) Kenny McDowall
Fitness coach	(Wales) Adam Owen
Goalkeepers coach	(Scotland) Billy Thomson (until 1 August) (Scotland) Jim Stewart (from 1 August)

Source: Wikipedia

=== Other staff ===
Position	Staff
Physiotherapist	(Scotland) Davie Henderson (until 1 August) (Scotland) Philip Yeates (from September)
Doctor	(Scotland) Dr Paul Jackson
Chief Scout	(Scotland) Ewan Chester
Massuer	(Scotland) David Lavery
Kit controller	(Scotland) Jimmy Bell
Video Analyst	(Scotland) Steve Harvey
Head of Football; Administration	(Scotland) Andrew Dickson

Source: Wikipedia

== Matches ==
=== Pre-season and friendlies ===
Game	Date	Tournament	Round	Ground	Opponent	Score^{1}	Report
1	13 July 2007	Friendly		A (Germany)	FC Gütersloh (Germany)	3–0	Report / Report link; Kick off / BST; Attendance / 1,850; FC Gütersloh / Rangers; / 13' Webster; 43' (pen.) Boyd; 75' Burke
2	15 July 2007	Friendly		A (Germany)	SV Lippstadt 08 (Germany)	4–2	Report / Report link; Kick off / BST; Attendance / 2,000; SV Lippstadt 08 / Rangers; 16' Gutic; 16' Gutic / 11' Šebo; 53' (pen.) Novo; 58' McCulloch; 53' McCulloch
3	17 July 2007	Friendly		A (Germany)	Hannover 96 (Germany)	0–1	Report / Report link; Kick off / BST; Attendance / 23,105; Referee / Florian Meyer (Germany); Hannover 96 / Rangers; 53' (o.g.) Weir
4	21 July 2007	Friendly		A	Falkirk	1–1	Report / Report link; Kick off / 15:00 BST; Referee / Craig Charleston; Falkirk / Rangers; 49' Moutinho / 1' McCulloch
5	24 July 2007	Friendly		H	Ajax (Netherlands)	1–1	Report / Report link; Kick off / 15:00 BST; Attendance / 32,770; Referee / Kenny Clark; Rangers / Ajax; 19' Cuéllar / 61' Heitinga
6	28 July 2007	Friendly		H	Chelsea (England)	2–0	Report / Report link; Kick off / 15:00 BST; Attendance / 50,380; Referee / Stuart Dougal; Rangers / Chelsea; 86' Novo; 87' Šebo

Last updated: 28 July 2007
^{1}Rangers goals come first.
National flags for Ground and Opponent columns are only shown when different from that of Rangers.
M = Match; Ground: H = Home, A = Away, N = Neutral, HR = Home replacement, AR = Away replacement.

=== Scottish Premier League ===
Game	Date	Tournament	Round	Ground	Opponent	Score^{1}	Report
2	4 August 2007	Scottish Premier League	1	A	Inverness Caledonian Thistle	3–0	Report / Report link; Kick off / 12:30 BST; Attendance / 7,711; Referee / Kenny Clark; Inverness Caledonian Thistle / Rangers; / 16' Ferguson; 64' Novo; 90' Ferguson
4	11 August 2007	Scottish Premier League	2	H	St Mirren	2–0	Report / Report link; Kick off / 15:00 BST; Attendance / 47,772; Referee / Mike McCurry; Rangers / St Mirren; 52' Ferguson; 80' Cousin
6	18 August 2007	Scottish Premier League	3	H	Falkirk	7–2	Report / Report link; Kick off / 15:00 BST; Attendance / 47,419; Referee / Eddie Smith; Rangers / Falkirk; 2' Cousin; 34' Whittaker; 54' Cousin; 75' Boyd; 88' Darcheville; 90' Darcheville; 90' Broadfoot / 44' Riera; 72' Barrett
7	25 August 2007	Scottish Premier League	4	A	Kilmarnock	2–1	Report / Report link; Kick off / 12:30 BST; Attendance / 11,544; Referee / Dougie McDonald; Kilmarnock / Rangers; 61' Invincibile / 52' Beasley; 76' Darcheville
9	1 September 2007	Scottish Premier League	5	H	Gretna	4–0	Report / Report link; Kick off / 15:00 BST; Attendance / 49,689; Referee / Mike Tumilty; Rangers / Gretna; 38' Boyd; 63' Webster; 81' Cuéllar; 83' (o.g.) Collin
10	15 September 2007	Scottish Premier League	6	A	Heart of Midlothian	2–4	Report / Report link; Kick off / 12:30 BST; Attendance / 15,948; Referee / Mike McCurry; Heart of Midlothian / Rangers; 13' Driver; 27' Tall; 66' (pen.) Stewart; 70' Ivaškevičius / 49' (pen.) Cousin; 74' Beasley
12	23 September 2007	Scottish Premier League	7	H	Aberdeen	3–0	Report / Report link; Kick off / 15:00 BST; Attendance / 49,046; Referee / Iain Brines; Rangers / Aberdeen; 46' McCulloch; 65' Naismith; 88' Boyd
14	29 September 2007	Scottish Premier League	8	A	Motherwell	1–1	Report / Report link; Kick off / 12:30 BST; Attendance / 10,009; Referee / Craig Thomson; Motherwell / Rangers; 23' Porter / 65' (pen.) Boyd
16	6 October 2007	Scottish Premier League	9	H	Hibernian	0–1	Report / Report link; Kick off / 15:00 BST; Attendance / 50,440; Referee / Kenny Clark; Rangers / Hibernian; / 61' Murphy
17	20 October 2007	Scottish Premier League	10	H	Celtic	3–0	Report / Report link; Kick off / 12:30 BST; Attendance / 50,428; Referee / Mike McCurry; Rangers / Celtic; 27' Novo; 55' Ferguson; 77' (pen.) Novo
19	28 October 2007	Scottish Premier League	11	A	Dundee United	1–2	Report / Report link; Kick off / 14:00 GMT; Attendance / 12,129; Referee / Dougie McDonald; Dundee United / Rangers; 28' Wilkie; 54' (pen.) Robson / 51' (pen.) Cousin
21	3 November 2007	Scottish Premier League	12	H	Inverness Caledonian Thistle	2–0	Report / Report link; Kick off / 15:00 GMT; Attendance / 48,898; Referee / William Collum; Rangers / Inverness Caledonian Thistle; 1' Boyd; 63' Cuéllar
23	24 November 2007	Scottish Premier League	13	A	Falkirk	3–1	Report / Report link; Kick off / 12:30 GMT; Attendance / 6,627; Referee / Iain Brines; Rangers / Falkirk; 62' Moutinho / 20' Cuéllar; 55' Darcheville; 90' Boyd
25	1 December 2007	Scottish Premier League	14	H	Kilmarnock	2–0	Report / Report link; Kick off / 15:00 GMT; Attendance / 48,055; Referee / Alan Freeland; Rangers / Kilmarnock; 4' Darcheville; 55' Whittaker
27	15 December 2007	Scottish Premier League	15	H	Heart of Midlothian	2–1	Report / Report link; Kick off / 155:00 GMT; Attendance / 48,392; Referee / Dougie McDonald; Rangers / Heart of Midlothian; 18' McCulloch; 87' McCulloch / 18' Velička
28	23 December 2007	Scottish Premier League	16	A	Aberdeen	1–1	Report / Report link; Kick off / 15:00 GMT; Attendance / 17,798; Referee / Kenny Clark; Aberdeen / Rangers; 45' Miller / 30' Adam; (red card) 37' McCulloch
29	26 December 2007	Scottish Premier League	17	H	Motherwell	3–1	Report / Report link; Kick off / 15:00 GMT; Attendance / 49,823; Referee / Steve Conroy; Rangers / Motherwell; 42' Cousin; 70' (o.g.) Porter; 90' Boyd / 65' Quinn
30	29 December 2007	Scottish Premier League	18	A	Hibernian	2–1	Report / Report link; Kick off / 12:30 GMT; Attendance / 16,217; Referee / Charlie Richmond; Hibernian / Rangers; 88' Zemmama / 12' Naismith; 59' Cousin
31	5 January 2008	Scottish Premier League	19	H	Dundee United	2–0	Report / Report link; Kick off / 15:00 GMT; Attendance / 48,559; Referee / Mike McCurry; Rangers / Dundee United; 9' Naismith; 40' Ferguson
32	16 January 2008	Scottish Premier League	20	AR	Gretna	2–1	Report / Report link; Kick off / 19:45 GMT; Attendance / 6,137; Referee / Iain Brines; Gretna / Rangers; 46' Deuchar / 45' Ferguson; 74' Cousin
33	19 January 2008	Scottish Premier League	21	A	Inverness Caledonian Thistle	1–0	Report / Report link; Kick off / 14:00 GMT; Attendance / 7,753; Referee / Charlie Richmond; Inverness Caledonian Thistle / Rangers; / 89' Darcheville
35	26 January 2008	Scottish Premier League	22	H	St Mirren	4–0	Report / Report link; Kick off / 15:00 GMT; Attendance / 49,198; Referee / Mike Tumilty; Rangers / St Mirren; 27' Burke; 33' Boyd; 37' Whittaker; 81' Whittaker / (yellow card) 30' (red card) Haining
38	9 February 2008	Scottish Premier League	23	H	Falkirk	2–0	Report / Report link; Kick off / 15:00 GMT; Attendance / 48,590; Referee / Brian Winter; Rangers / Falkirk; 23' Boyd; 89' Naismith
40	17 February 2008	Scottish Premier League	24	A	Kilmarnock	2–0	Report / Report link; Kick off / 14:00 GMT; Attendance / 10,546; Referee / Mike McCurry; Kilmarnock / Rangers; / 24' Cuéllar; 63' (pen.) Boyd
42	24 February 2008	Scottish Premier League	25	H	Gretna	4–2	Report / Report link; Kick off / 15:00 GMT; Attendance / 48,375; Referee / Calum Murray; Rangers / Gretna; 13' Cousin; 22' Naismith; 60' Burke; 88' Boyd / 71' Deuchar; 89' Deuchar
43	27 February 2008	Scottish Premier League	26	A	Heart of Midlothian	4–0	Report / Report link; Kick off / 19:45 GMT; Attendance / 16,173; Referee / Stuart Dougal; Heart of Midlothian / Rangers; / 25' Darcheville; 44' Darcheville; 53' Novo; 70' Novo
44	1 March 2008	Scottish Premier League	27	H	Aberdeen	3–1	Report / Report link; Kick off / 15:00 GMT; Attendance / 50,066; Referee / Kenny Clark; Rangers / Aberdeen; 38' Dailly; 50' Adam; 83' Boyd / 28' Lovell
50	22 March 2008	Scottish Premier League	28	H	Hibernian	2–1	Report / Report link; Kick off / 15:00 GMT; Attendance / 50,117; Referee / Steve Conroy; Rangers / Hibernian; 40' Darcheville; 79' Novo / 90' Shiels
51	29 March 2008	Scottish Premier League	29	H	Celtic	1–0	Report / Report link; Kick off / 12:30 GMT; Attendance / 50,325; Referee / Stuart Dougal; Rangers / Celtic; 45' Thomson
53	6 April 2008	Scottish Premier League	30	A	Dundee United	3–3	Report / Report link; Kick off / 14:00 BST; Attendance / 11,214; Referee / Charlie Richmond; Dundee United / Rangers; 37' Kalvenes; 57' Hunt; 65' (o.g.) Cuéllar / 44' Weir; 58' Novo; 67' Boyd
56	16 April 2008	Scottish Premier League	31	A	Celtic	1–2	Report / Report link; Kick off / 19:45 BST; Attendance / 58,964; Referee / Kenny Clark; Celtic / Rangers; 20' Nakamura; 90+3' Hesselink / 55' Novo; (red card) 70' Cuéllar
59	27 April 2008	Scottish Premier League	32	A	Celtic	2–3	Report / Report link; Kick off / 12:30 BST; Attendance / 58,622; Referee / Craig Thomson; Celtic / Rangers; 4' McDonald; 43' McDonald; 70' (pen.) Robson / 17' Weir; 29' Cousin; (yellow card) 90' (red card) Whittaker
61	4 May 2008	Scottish Premier League	33	A	Hibernian	0–0	Report / Report link; Kick off / 14:00 BST; Attendance / 16,872; Referee / Calum Murray
62	7 May 2008	Scottish Premier League	34	H	Motherwell	1–0	Report / Report link; Kick off / 19:45 BST; Attendance / 48,238; Referee / Charlie Richmond; Rangers / Motherwell; 74' Ferguson
63	10 May 2008	Scottish Premier League	35	H	Dundee United	3–1	Report / Report link; Kick off / 12:30 BST; Attendance / 50,293; Referee / Mike McCurry; Rangers / Dundee United; 7' Novo; 18' Novo; 90' Darcheville / 76' de Vries
65	17 May 2008	Scottish Premier League	36	A	Motherwell	1–1	Report / Report link; Kick off / 12:30 BST; Attendance / 10,445; Referee / John Underhill; Motherwell / Rangers; 50' Porter / 29' Dailly
66	19 May 2008	Scottish Premier League	37	A	St Mirren	3–0	Report / Report link; Kick off / 19:45 BST; Attendance / 7,439; Referee / Craig Thomson; St Mirren / Rangers; / 4' Boyd; 24' Darcheville; 69' Darcheville
67	22 May 2008	Scottish Premier League	38	A	Aberdeen	0–2	Report / Report link; Kick off / 19:45 BST; Attendance / 17,509; Referee / Kenny Clark; Aberdeen / Rangers; 63' Miller; 77' Mackie / (red card) 77' Novo

Last updated: 22 May 2008
^{1}Rangers goals come first.
National flags for Ground and Opponent columns are only shown when different from that of Rangers.
M = Match; Ground: H = Home, A = Away, N = Neutral, HR = Home replacement, AR = Away replacement.

=== Scottish League Cup ===
Game	Date	Tournament	Round	Ground	Opponent	Score^{1}	Report
13	26 September 2007	Scottish League Cup	3	AR	East Fife	4–0	Report / Report link; Kick off / 19:45 BST; Attendance / 7,413; Referee / William Collum; East Fife / Rangers; / 14' Novo; 35' Boyd; 54' Cuéllar; 66' (pen.) Boyd
20	31 October 2007	Scottish League Cup	QF	A	Motherwell	2–1	Report / Report link; Kick off / 19:45 GMT; Attendance / 9,283; Referee / Dougie McDonald; Motherwell / Rangers; 90' Quinn / 22' Novo; 53' Boyd
36	30 January 2008	Scottish League Cup	SF	N	Heart of Midlothian	2–0	Report / Report link; Kick off / 19:45 GMT; Attendance / 31,989; Referee / Mike McCurry; Rangers / Heart of Midlothian; 50' Ferguson; 69' Darcheville
48	16 March 2008	Scottish League Cup	F	N	Dundee United	2–2 (3-2 pen.)	Report / Report link; Kick off / 15:00 GMT; Attendance / 50,019; Referee / Kenny Clark; Dundee United / Rangers; 34' Hunt; 96' de Vries / 85' Boyd; 113' Boyd

Last updated: 16 March 2008
^{1}Rangers goals come first.
National flags for Ground and Opponent columns are only shown when different from that of Rangers.
M = Match; Ground: H = Home, A = Away, N = Neutral, HR = Home replacement, AR = Away replacement.

=== Scottish Cup ===
Game	Date	Tournament	Round	Ground	Opponent	Score^{1}	Report
34	23 January 2008	Scottish Cup	4	H	East Stirlingshire	6–0	Report / Report link; Kick off / 19:45 GMT; Attendance / 34,024; Referee / Crawford Allan; Rangers / East Stirlingshire; 25' McCulloch; 28' Hutton; 30' Boyd; 45' Boyd; 50' McCulloch; 62' (pen.) Boyd
37	3 February 2008	Scottish Cup	5	A	Hibernian	0–0	Report / Report link; Kick off / 12:00 GMT; Attendance / 11,513; Referee / Craig Thomson; Hibernian / Rangers; / (red card) 88' McGregor
46	9 March 2008	Scottish Cup	5 R	H	Hibernian	1–0	Report / Report link; Kick off / 15:00 GMT; Attendance / 33,837; Referee / Craig Thomson; Rangers / Hibernian; 39' Burke; (red card) 79' Novo
49	19 March 2008	Scottish Cup	QF	H	Partick Thistle	1–1	Report / Report link; Kick off / 19:45 GMT; Attendance / 36,724; Referee / Iain Brines; Rangers / Partick Thistle; 69' Boyd / 67' Gray
55	13 April 2008	Scottish Cup	QF R	A	Partick Thistle	2–0	Report / Report link; Kick off / 15:00 BST; Attendance / 9,909; Referee / Iain Brines; Partick Thistle / Rangers; / 27' Novo; 40' Burke
57	20 April 2008	Scottish Cup	SF	N	St Johnstone	1–1 (4-3 pen.)	Report / Report link; Kick off / 15:00 BST; Attendance / 26,180; Referee / Dougie McDonald; St Johnstone / Rangers; 94' McBreen / 103' (pen.) Novo
68	24 May 2008	Scottish Cup	F	N	Queen of the South	3–2	Report / Report link; Kick off / 15:00 BST; Attendance / 48,821; Referee / Stuart Dougal; Queen of the South / Rangers; 50' Tosh; 53' Thomson / 33' Boyd; 43' Beasley; 72' Boyd

Last updated: 24 May 2008
^{1}Rangers goals come first.
National flags for Ground and Opponent columns are only shown when different from that of Rangers.
M = Match; Ground: H = Home, A = Away, N = Neutral, HR = Home replacement, AR = Away replacement.

=== UEFA Champions League ===
Game	Date	Tournament	Round	Ground	Opponent	Score^{1}	Report
1	31 July 2007	UEFA Champions League	QR2	H	(Montenegro) Zeta	2–0	Report / Report link; Kick off / 19:45 BST; Attendance / 36,145; Referee / Georgios Kasnaferis; Rangers / Zeta; 55' Weir; (yellow card) 60' (red card) Hutton; 73' McCulloch
3	7 August 2007	UEFA Champions League	QR2	AR	(Montenegro) Zeta	1–0	Report / Report link; Kick off / 19:05 BST; Attendance / 11,000; Referee / Paolo Dondarini; Zeta / Rangers; / 81' Beasley
5	14 August 2007	UEFA Champions League	QR3	H	(Serbia) Red Star Belgrade	1–0	Report / Report link; Kick off / 19:45 BST; Attendance / 35,364; Referee / Martin Hansson; Rangers / Red Star Belgrade; 89' Novo
8	28 August 2007	UEFA Champions League	QR3	A	(Serbia) Red Star Belgrade	0–0	Report / Report link; Kick off / 19:00 BST; Attendance / 47,012; Referee / Lucílio Batista
11	19 September 2007	UEFA Champions League	GS	H	(Germany) VfB Stuttgart	2–1	Report / Report link; Kick off / 19:45 BST; Attendance / 49,795; Referee / Stefano Farina; Rangers / VfB Stuttgart; 62' Adam; 75' (pen.) Darcheville / 56' Gómez
15	2 October 2007	UEFA Champions League	GS	A	(France) Lyon	3–0	Report / Report link; Kick off / 19:45 BST; Attendance / 38,067; Referee / Tom Ovrebo; Lyon / Rangers; / 23' McCulloch; 48' Cousin; 53' Beasley
18	23 October 2007	UEFA Champions League	GS	H	(Spain) Barcelona	0–0	Report / Report link; Kick off / 19:45 BST; Attendance / 49,957; Referee / Konrad Plautz
22	7 November 2007	UEFA Champions League	GS	A	(Spain) Barcelona	0–2	Report / Report link; Kick off / 19:45 GMT; Attendance / 86,476; Referee / Eric Braamhaar; Barcelona / Rangers; 7' Henry; 43' Messi
24	27 November 2007	UEFA Champions League	GS	A	(Germany) VfB Stuttgart	2–3	Report / Report link; Kick off / 19:45 GMT; Attendance / 51,000; Referee / Darko Ceferin; VfB Stuttgart / Rangers; 45' Cacau; 62' Pardo; 85' Marica / 27' Adam; 70' Ferguson
26	12 December 2007	UEFA Champions League	GS	H	(France) Lyon	0–3	Report / Report link; Kick off / 19:45 GMT; Attendance / 50,062; Referee / Lubos Michel; Rangers / Lyon; (red card) 90' Darcheville / 16' Govou; 85' Benzema; 88' Benzema

Last updated: 12 December 2007
^{1}Rangers goals come first.
National flags for Ground and Opponent columns are only shown when different from that of Rangers.
M = Match; Ground: H = Home, A = Away, N = Neutral, HR = Home replacement, AR = Away replacement.

=== UEFA Cup ===
Game	Date	Tournament	Round	Ground	Opponent	Score^{1}	Report
39	13 February 2008	UEFA Cup	Round of 32	H	(Greece) Panathinaikos	0–0	Report / Report link; Kick off / 20:00 GMT; Attendance / 45,203; Referee / Nicola Rizzoli
41	21 February 2008	UEFA Cup	Round of 32	A	(Greece) Panathinaikos	1–1	Report / Report link; Kick off / 17:00 GMT; Attendance / 14,452; Referee / Felix Brych; Panathinaikos / Rangers; 12' Goumas / 81' Novo
45	6 March 2008	UEFA Cup	Round of 16	H	(Germany) Werder Bremen	2–0	Report / Report link; Kick off / 20:00 GMT; Attendance / 45,959; Referee / Alain Hamer; Rangers / Werder Bremen; 45' Cousin; 48' Davis
47	13 March 2008	UEFA Cup	Round of 16	A	(Germany) Werder Bremen	0–1	Report / Report link; Kick off / 19:30 GMT; Attendance / 33,660; Referee / Martin Hansson; Werder Bremen / Rangers; 57' Diego
52	3 April 2008	UEFA Cup	QF	H	(Portugal) Sporting CP	0–0	Report / Report link; Kick off / 19:45 BST; Attendance / 48,923; Referee / Yuri Baskakov
54	10 April 2008	UEFA Cup	QF	A	(Portugal) Sporting CP	2–0	Report / Report link; Kick off / 19:45 BST; Attendance / 31,155; Referee / Konrad Plautz; Sporting CP / Rangers; / 60' Darcheville; 90' Whittaker
58	24 April 2008	UEFA Cup	SF	H	(Italy) Fiorentina	0–0	Report / Report link; Kick off / 19:45 BST; Attendance / 49,199; Referee / Kyros Vassaras
60	1 May 2008	UEFA Cup	SF	A	(Italy) Fiorentina	0–0 (4-2 pen.)	Report / Report link; Kick off / 19:45 BST; Attendance / 39,130; Referee / Frank De Bleeckere; Fiorentina / Rangers; / (yellow card) 110' (red card) Cousin
64	14 May 2008	UEFA Cup	F	N	(Russia) Zenit	0–2	Report / Report link; Kick off / 19:45 BST; Attendance / 43,878; Referee / Peter Fröjdfeldt; Zenit / Rangers; 72' Denisov; 90+4' Zyryanov

Last updated: 14 May 2008
^{1}Rangers goals come first.
National flags for Ground and Opponent columns are only shown when different from that of Rangers.
M = Match; Ground: H = Home, A = Away, N = Neutral, HR = Home replacement, AR = Away replacement.

== Competitions ==
=== Overall ===
Competition	Started round	Final position / round	First match	Last match
Scottish Premier League	—	2nd	4 August	22 May
UEFA Champions League	Second Qualifying Round	Group Stage	31 July	12 December
UEFA Cup	Round of 32	Runners-up	13 February	14 May
Scottish League Cup	Third round	Winners	24 September	16 March
Scottish Cup	Fourth round	Winners	13 January	24 May

Source: Competitions

=== Scottish Premier League ===
==== Standings ====
Pos	Team	Pld	W	D	L	GF	GA	GD	Pts	Qualification or relegation (Note: Teams played each other three times (33 matches), before the league split into two groups (the top six and the bottom six) for the last five matches.)
1	Celtic (C)	38	28	5	5	84	26	+58	89	Qualification for the Champions League group stage
2	Rangers	38	27	5	6	84	33	+51	86	Qualification for the Champions League second qualifying round
3	Motherwell	38	18	6	14	50	46	+4	60	Qualification for the UEFA Cup first round
4	Aberdeen	38	15	8	15	50	58	−8	53	
5	Dundee United	38	14	10	14	53	47	+6	52	

Source: Scottish Professional Football League
Rules for classification: 1) Points; 2) Goal difference; 3) Goals scored
(C) Champions

==== Results summary ====
Overall								Home						Away					
Pld	W	D	L	GF	GA	GD	Pts	W	D	L	GF	GA	GD	W	D	L	GF	GA	GD
38	27	5	6	84	33	+51	86	18	0	1	50	10	+40	9	5	5	34	23	+11

Last updated: 24 May 2008.
Source: Scottish Premier League 2007–08

==== Results by round ====
Round	1	2	3	4	5	6	7	8	9	10	11	12	13	14	15	16	17	18	19	20	21	22	23	24	25	26	27	28	29	30	31	32	33	34	35	36	37	38
Ground	A	H	H	A	H	A	H	A	H	H	A	H	A	H	H	A	H	A	H	A	A	H	H	A	H	A	H	H	H	A	A	A	A	H	H	A	A	A
Result	W	W	W	W	W	L	W	D	L	W	L	W	W	W	W	D	W	W	W	W	W	W	W	W	W	W	W	W	W	D	L	L	D	W	W	D	W	L

Updated to match(es) played on 22 May 2008. Source: 2007–08 Scottish Premier League
A = Away; H = Home; W = Win; D = Draw; L = Loss

=== UEFA Champions League ===
==== Group E ====
Pos	Team	Pld	W	D	L	GF	GA	GD	Pts	Qualification
1	(Spain) Barcelona	6	4	2	0	12	3	+9	14	Advance to knockout stage
2	(France) Lyon	6	3	1	2	11	10	+1	10	Advance to knockout stage
3	(Scotland) Rangers	6	2	1	3	7	9	−2	7	Transfer to UEFA Cup
4	(Germany) VfB Stuttgart	6	1	0	5	7	15	−8	3	

Source: RSSSF
