= William Stanger =

William Stanger may refer to:

- William Stanger (footballer) (born 1985), French footballer
- William Stanger (surveyor), surveyor-general in South Africa
