= Allan McGregor =

Scottish footballer (born 1982)

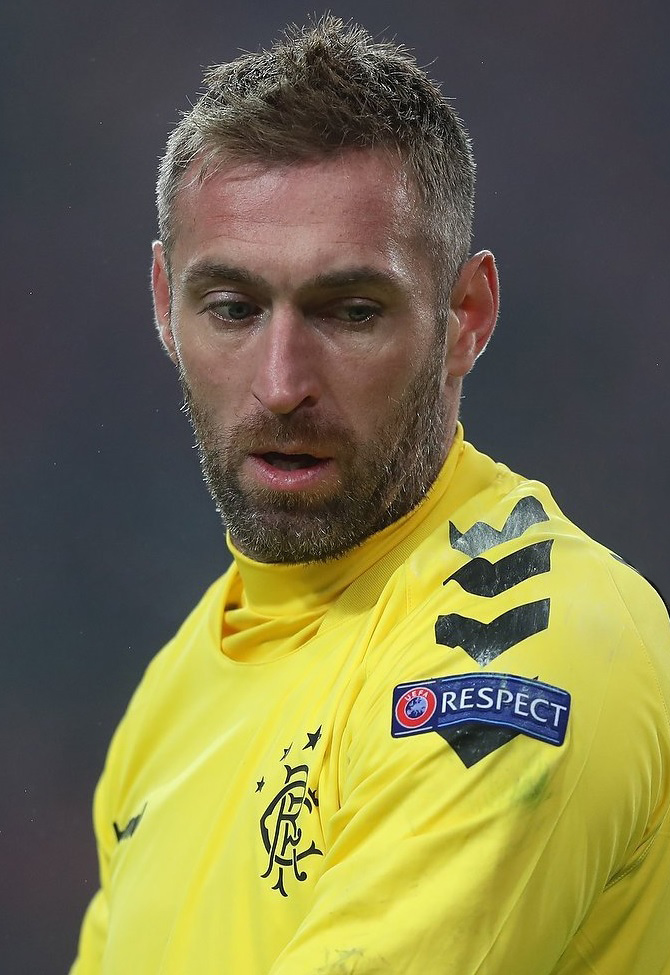
- McGregor in 2018

Personal information
- Full name: Allan James McGregor
- Date of birth: 31 January 1982 (age 44)
- Place of birth: Edinburgh, Scotland
- Height: 6 ft 0 in (1.83 m)
- Position: Goalkeeper

Youth career
- 1989–1995: Hutchison Vale
- 1998–2001: Rangers

Senior career*
Years	Team	Apps	(Gls)
2001–2012	Rangers	205	(0)
2004–2005	→ St Johnstone (loan)	20	(0)
2005–2006	→ Dunfermline Athletic (loan)	26	(0)
2012–2013	Beşiktaş	27	(0)
2013–2018	Hull City	141	(0)
2017	→ Cardiff City (loan)	19	(0)
2018–2023	Rangers	141	(0)
Total		579	(0)

International career
2002–2003	Scotland U21	6	(0)
2004	Scotland B	1	(0)
2007–2018	Scotland	42	(0)
- * Club domestic league appearances and goals as of 22:16, 24 May 2023 (UTC)

Allan James McGregor (born 31 January 1982) is a Scottish former professional footballer and current goalkeeping coach at Rangers. McGregor has previously played for Rangers, St Johnstone, Dunfermline Athletic, Turkish team Beşiktaş, English club Hull City and Welsh side Cardiff City, and made 42 international appearances for Scotland.

A product of the Hutchison Vale youth football club in Edinburgh, McGregor made his first team debut for Rangers in February 2002 in a Scottish Cup match against Forfar Athletic. He was later loaned out to St Johnstone and Dunfermline Athletic, before becoming a regular Rangers first team player at the start of the 2006–07 season. McGregor made over 200 appearances for Rangers, winning 11 major honours in the process, including a hat-trick of league titles in 2009, 2010 and 2011, three Scottish Cups and five Scottish League Cups.

Following the liquidation of Rangers in 2012, McGregor exercised his legal rights to become a free agent. He then signed a two-year contract with Beşiktaş. After one season in Turkey, McGregor moved to Hull City. In May 2018, McGregor signed a two-year contract with Rangers. After five seasons in his second spell there, during which he won a league title in 2021, McGregor retired from playing in 2023.

McGregor made his full international debut for Scotland in May 2007. After multiple breaches of squad discipline following Scotland's 3–0 defeat to the Netherlands on 28 March 2009, McGregor was suspended for two weeks by his club, and the Scottish Football Association said that he would never play for Scotland again. The following year, this ban from international football was overturned by Scotland manager Craig Levein. He made 42 appearances for Scotland in total, and announced his retirement from international play in March 2019.

== Playing career ==
=== Club ===
==== Rangers ====
McGregor signed for Rangers on 14 July 1998. His early career suffered a setback when he injured his wrist during a youth match followed by a broken hand that kept him out of action for nearly a year and stunted his development. However, upon returning from the injury he became a regular in the reserve team.

McGregor first appeared in a senior match squad in January 1999, featuring as an unused substitute at age 16. He made his first team debut in February 2002 in a Scottish Cup match against Forfar Athletic and his Scottish Premier League debut against Aberdeen aged 20. McGregor did not play a single minute of competitive football during the 2002–03 season, being an unused substitute in every match of Rangers' Treble success. The following season, McGregor made six appearances, twice in the Scottish League Cup and four times in the league.

In the 2004–05 season McGregor was loaned to First Division club St Johnstone, making his debut in a Scottish Challenge Cup match against Alloa Athletic. McGregor featured consistently for St Johnstone and kept six consecutive clean sheets for the club. While playing on loan, McGregor was named SFL Player of the Month for December 2004. He made 24 appearances in total for the club and kept 11 clean sheets. Upon returning to Rangers in January 2005, McGregor looked to have been given the opportunity of becoming the number one goalkeeper at the club after an injury to first choice Stefan Klos, but manager Alex McLeish signed Dutch keeper Ronald Waterreus on deadline day in January 2005, a move which angered McGregor.

For the 2005–06 season, Rangers retained Waterreus and Klos, leaving McGregor as third choice. Dunfermline Athletic took advantage of this situation and signed McGregor on loan for the season. He made his debut in a 3–2 league defeat to Kilmarnock. McGregor played for Dunfermline in the 2006 Scottish League Cup final, losing to Celtic, and made 31 appearances in all competitions, keeping seven clean sheets.

With the arrival of Frenchman Paul Le Guen as manager at Rangers, McGregor was made third choice goalkeeper behind Letizi and Klos. A pre-season cycling injury to Stefan Klos meant that McGregor started the 2006–07 season as back-up to Lionel Letizi. When Letizi was himself injured, McGregor started the next match for Rangers, a 2–2 draw away to Kilmarnock. McGregor was then awarded the man of the match award for his performance in Rangers Uefa Cup qualifying match against Molde. He went on to be awarded the Scottish Premier League Player of the Month for September and was then rewarded with a new contract. Despite his performances Le Guen still considered McGregor to be the second choice goalkeeper. McGregor was dropped when Letizi returned from injury. When Letizi was injured again, McGregor returned in goal and was confirmed as first choice by Le Guen even after Letizi returned from injury.

Later in the 2006–07 season McGregor was sent off during Rangers' UEFA Cup match at Ibrox against Israeli side Hapoel Tel Aviv, which they won 4–0. After Barry Ferguson's second goal, Italian referee Matteo Trefoloni gave a straight red card to McGregor for allegedly headbutting Hapoel substitute Luciano De Bruno. The incident was not caught on television cameras and McGregor denied headbutting De Bruno. However, he was given a two-match ban, which was reduced to one game on appeal. At the end of his first season as first choice keeper, he was voted by his Rangers teammates as the Player's Player of the Year. In September 2007 McGregor signed a new four-year contract with Rangers.

He continued to be Rangers' number one the following season, despite the arrival and subsequent departure of former Manchester United goalkeeper Roy Carroll. Rangers progressed to the quarter-finals of the 2008 UEFA Cup after putting out SV Werder Bremen in the fourth round. McGregor's display in the second-leg of the tie drew praise from the manager. He made his 100th appearance for Rangers in a league match against Hibernian in March 2008. In the 2008 Scottish League Cup final the match finished 2–2 after extra time and went to penalty kicks. McGregor saved two penalties and Rangers went on to win the shoot-out and the League Cup. In the third Old Firm League match of the 2007–08 season McGregor saved a penalty while limping with an injury when the scores were tied at 1–1. McGregor had to be substituted shortly after and didn't play again that season through injury, missing out on both the 2008 Scottish Cup final and Rangers European run to the 2008 UEFA Cup final.

McGregor signed another new contract in June 2008, keeping him at the club until 2013 and was worth £5 million. In the opening game of the 2008–09 season McGregor saved a penalty in the match against Falkirk, Rangers went on to win 1–0. McGregor captained the club for the first Scottish Premier League match of the 2008–09 season against Falkirk due to the absences of captain Barry Ferguson and senior players David Weir and Carlos Cuéllar. McGregor was a regular in the side, up until the Boozegate scandal which saw himself and Ferguson dropped by both club and country and was replaced as the Rangers number one by Neil Alexander. He played his last game of that season on 21 March, a 2–2 draw at home to Hearts. McGregor played 27 league matches in the 2008–09 season and picked up an SPL winners medal.

In the 2009–10 season McGregor was reinstated as the number one goalkeeper for Rangers and made 46 appearances in all competitions, picking up winners medals in the Scottish League Cup and the SPL championship. Although McGregor was preferred as first choice in League, Europe and Scottish Cup matches the manager Walter Smith decided to let Neil Alexander play all of the League Cup matches, a decision which continued the following season.

In October 2010 McGregor was given a one match retrospective ban by the SFA for kicking out at Aberdeen player Chris Maguire even though no contact was made. In April of season 2010–11 McGregor saved a penalty against Hamilton in a match that Rangers went on to win 1–0. McGregor was praised for his performances in the second half of the 2010–11 season winning the SPL player of the month award for April. This included 5 clean sheets in the month including a man of the match performance in the final Old Firm game of the season where he saved a penalty with 8 minutes of the game remaining. Rangers went on to win the SPL championship for the third consecutive time by one point. McGregor kept 22 clean sheets for Rangers in 36 SPL matches during season 2010–11 and signaled his intention to sign a new contract once the season was finished.

On 4 July 2011, it was announced by Rangers that McGregor had signed a new six-year contract with the club. McGregor started the first nine matches for Rangers in season 2011–12 conceding only one goal domestically in the season opener against Hearts. In the first Old Firm game of the season McGregor was criticised for making a bad mistake which gifted a goal to Celtic just before half time which made the score 2–1 in Celtic's favour. Rangers however went on to win the match 4–2. McGregor was praised by his manager Ally McCoist for preventing Rangers conceding a goal in their 1–0 victory over Hibernian in October 2011.

Rangers entered administration in February 2012. After its creditors rejected a CVA in June 2012, the company was liquidated. The administrator sold the assets, including player contracts, to a new Rangers company set up by Charles Green. McGregor made a legal objection (under the "TUPE" regulations) to his contract being transferred to the new company, and became a free agent.

==== Beşiktaş ====
On 26 July 2012, McGregor joined Turkish club Beşiktaş on a two-year contract, after undergoing a medical in Istanbul. A first team regular, McGregor helped Beşiktaş to a third-placed finish in the Turkish Süper Lig.

==== Hull City ====
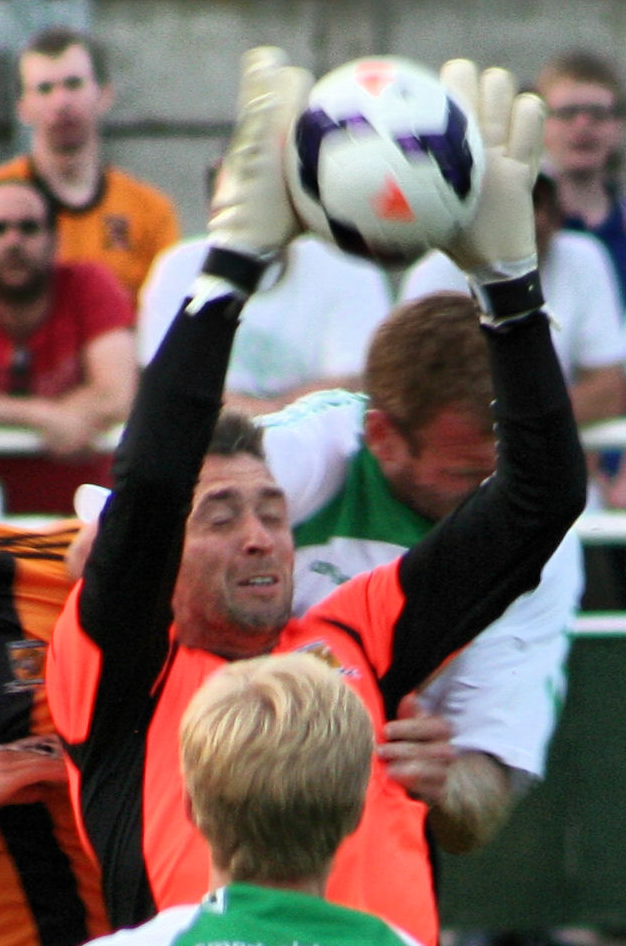
McGregor playing for Hull City in 2013

On 2 July 2013, McGregor signed for Hull City for £1.5 million, signing a three-year contract. He made his debut on the first day of the 2013–14 season in a 2–0 loss away at Chelsea. Five minutes into his debut, McGregor conceded a penalty, mistiming a punch and subsequently hitting Fernando Torres in the head. He made up for it however, as he saved the resulting penalty from Frank Lampard. In the 25th minute, Lampard got the better of him, scoring a free-kick from 30 yards. On 17 May 2014, he played in the 2014 FA Cup final against Arsenal, in which Hull City lost 3–2.

During the 2016–17 season, McGregor was recovering from a back injury, thus leaving him behind Eldin Jakupovic and David Marshall in the pecking order. He was loaned to Cardiff City in January 2017 to bolster his fitness before he could play for Hull again. He kept a clean sheet on his debut during a 1–0 victory over Burton Albion on 21 January 2017. He left Hull in the summer of 2018, having rejected the offer of a new contract.

==== Return to Rangers ====
In May 2018, McGregor accepted the offer of a two-year contract with Rangers. At the end of the 2018–19 season, he was named in the PFA Scotland Team of the Year (for a fourth time in his career).

During the first half of the 2019–20 season, McGregor helped Rangers qualify from their Europa League group. In December 2019, Rangers and McGregor agreed to extend his contract by a year. In the Old Firm derby played on 29 December 2019, McGregor saved a penalty from Ryan Christie. Rangers went on to win the match 2–1, which was their first victory at Celtic Park since October 2010.

At the start of December 2020, McGregor set a club record for appearances in UEFA competitions. At the end of the month he made his 400th appearance across his two Rangers spells. McGregor was praised for his performance in a 1–0 Old Firm win against Celtic on 2 January 2021, particularly for a fingertip save from Leigh Griffiths. McGregor helped Rangers reach the 2022 UEFA Europa League final, which they lost on penalties to Eintracht Frankfurt. He then appeared as a substitute in their 2022 Scottish Cup final victory against Hearts.

On 20 June 2022, McGregor signed a new one-year contract with Rangers. He started the season as second choice to Jon McLaughlin and had to wait until the end of August to make a first team appearance, in a League Cup match against Queen of the South. The following month McGregor re-established himself in the starting eleven after McLaughlin made several high-profile errors in matches against Celtic and Ajax respectively. Thereafter he was predominately selected as first choice goalkeeper for the rest of the season, including in the remaining five UEFA Champions League group stage matches which increased his record number of European appearances for Rangers to 109. McGregor made his 500th competitive appearance for Rangers in a league match with Dundee United on 1 April 2023.

Rangers confirmed on 23 May 2023 that McGregor would leave the club at the end of the 2022–23 season. A testimonial match for McGregor was played on 18 July 2023 against Newcastle United at Ibrox.

=== International ===
McGregor was capped six times at under-21 level before representing the senior national side.

On 30 January 2007, ex-Rangers manager Alex McLeish named McGregor in his first squad as Scotland manager. He made his international debut against Austria on 30 May 2007, playing the first half in goal before being substituted. McGregor received his second cap for Scotland after coming on as a second-half substitute for Craig Gordon in a friendly against Northern Ireland at Hampden in August 2008. He gave away a penalty when he brought down Warren Feeney but saved the resulting spot kick from David Healy and the match ended in a 0–0 draw. McGregor was then first choice goalkeeper for the friendly match against Argentina at Hampden in November 2008; Scotland lost 1–0 but McGregor made a number of notable saves. McGregor made his first competitive start for Scotland when he was selected ahead of Craig Gordon for Scotland's 2010 World Cup qualifier against the Netherlands.

On 3 April 2009, McGregor was banned from representing Scotland again after multiple breaches of squad discipline. After returning to their hotel at 4am from the international game with the Netherlands on 28 March, McGregor and then-teammate Barry Ferguson were the last to leave the bar at lunchtime. They were subsequently dropped from the following match against Iceland on 1 April 2009, the incident has been referred to by the media as Boozegate. Gestures made by the players to cameras when they were both unused substitutes in the Iceland match led the SFA to inform the players by fax that they would not be considered for national team selection again. McGregor later apologised and was docked two weeks' wages by Rangers. McGregor was on the verge of being recalled to the national team by manager Craig Levein, but was omitted from the squad after he was attacked on the way home from a night out in Glasgow city centre. On 2 August 2010, McGregor was recalled to the national team for the 3–0 friendly defeat against Sweden. He made a number of important saves in the match to prevent a heavier defeat.

McGregor was named as first choice goalkeeper for Scotland's Euro 2012 qualifying matches in 2010, starting the first two matches against Lithuania and Liechtenstein. In the qualifying match against the Czech Republic McGregor was given the Man of the match award even though Scotland lost 1–0. McGregor was then given the man of the match award for his performance against World and European champions Spain even though Scotland were defeated at Hampden 3–2. Spain internationalist Pablo Hernandez believed McGregor to be a world class goalkeeper and said, "He made some amazing saves, it was a fantastic performance,"

McGregor remained first choice goalkeeper for Scotland when he was selected for the friendly against Brazil at the Emirates Stadium London in March 2011. Scotland lost 2–0. He was then selected for Scotland's first match in the Nations Cup against Northern Ireland in Dublin. Before the second match of the tournament against Wales, McGregor was praised by the Scotland manager Craig Levein as being an "absolute diamond" since Levein had taken over the Scotland team manager's job. McGregor then received his 12th and 13th caps in the tournaments matches against Wales, and Ireland. McGregor received the Scottish Sports Writers International Player of the Year award for season 2010–11.

McGregor started both international matches against Denmark and Czech Republic in August and September 2011 but was criticised for making a mistake in the friendly game against Denmark which cost Scotland a goal.

McGregor announced his retirement from international football in March 2019, having made 42 appearances for Scotland. His last appearance was in a 2018–19 UEFA Nations League game against Israel, when he produced an important save late on to preserve a 3–2 win.

== Coaching career ==
On 24 February 2025, McGregor was appointed interim goalkeeping coach at Scottish Premiership club Rangers working under interim Head Coach and former Rangers team mate Barry Ferguson following the dismissal of Philippe Clement.

On 8th July 2026, McGregor returned to Rangers as lead goalkeeping coach following the appointment of new manager Derek McInnes, replacing Sal Bibbo.

== Personal life ==
McGregor married his fiancée Cheryl Dunn at a ceremony held at Loch Lomond Golf Club in November 2020. His former Rangers and Scotland team-mate Alan Hutton was his best man.

== Career statistics ==
=== Club ===
As of 24 May 2023

Appearances and goals by club, season and competition
Club	Season	League			National cup		League cup		Other (Note: Includes Europe and Challenge Cup)		Total	
Club	Season	Division	Apps	Goals	Apps	Goals	Apps	Goals	Apps	Goals	Apps	Goals
Rangers	2001–02	Scottish Premier League	2	0	1	0	0	0	0	0	3	0
Rangers	2002–03	Scottish Premier League	0	0	0	0	0	0	0	0	0	0
Rangers	2003–04	Scottish Premier League	4	0	0	0	2	0	0	0	6	0
Rangers	2004–05	Scottish Premier League	2	0	0	0	0	0	0	0	2	0
Rangers	2005–06	Scottish Premier League	0	0	—		—		0	0	0	0
Rangers	2006–07	Scottish Premier League	31	0	1	0	2	0	8	0	42	0
Rangers	2007–08	Scottish Premier League	31	0	3	0	3	0	16	0	53	0
Rangers	2008–09	Scottish Premier League	27	0	3	0	3	0	2	0	35	0
Rangers	2009–10	Scottish Premier League	34	0	6	0	0	0	6	0	46	0
Rangers	2010–11	Scottish Premier League	37	0	3	0	0	0	8	0	48	0
Rangers	2011–12	Scottish Premier League	37	0	2	0	0	0	4	0	43	0
Rangers	Total		205	0	19	0	10	0	44	0	278	0
St Johnstone (loan)	2004–05	Scottish First Division	20	0	0	0	1	0	3	0	24	0
Dunfermline Athletic (loan)	2005–06	Scottish Premier League	26	0	1	0	4	0	—		31	0
Beşiktaş	2012–13	Turkish Süper Lig	27	0	0	0	—		—		27	0
Hull City	2013–14	Premier League	26	0	3	0	0	0	—		29	0
Hull City	2014–15	Premier League	27	0	0	0	0	0	4	0	31	0
Hull City	2015–16	Championship	44	0	0	0	0	0	0	0	44	0
Hull City	2016–17	Premier League	0	0	0	0	0	0	—		0	0
Hull City	2017–18	Championship	44	0	0	0	0	0	—		44	0
Hull City	Total		141	0	3	0	0	0	4	0	148	0
Cardiff City (loan)	2016–17	Championship	19	0	—		—		—		19	0
Rangers	2018–19	Scottish Premiership	34	0	3	0	1	0	14	0	52	0
Rangers	2019–20	Scottish Premiership	27	0	2	0	3	0	17	0	49	0
Rangers	2020–21	Scottish Premiership	27	0	2	0	1	0	12	0	42	0
Rangers	2021–22	Scottish Premiership	29	0	1	0	1	0	17	0	48	0
Rangers	2022–23	Scottish Premiership	24	0	4	0	3	0	5	0	36	0
Rangers	Total		141	0	13	0	9	0	65	0	227	0
Career total			579	0	35	0	25	0	116	0	754	0

=== International ===
Appearances and goals by national team and year
National team	Year	Apps	Goals
Scotland	2007	1	0
Scotland	2008	2	0
Scotland	2009	1	0
Scotland	2010	5	0
Scotland	2011	10	0
Scotland	2012	7	0
Scotland	2013	5	0
Scotland	2014	1	0
Scotland	2015	2	0
Scotland	2016	1	0
Scotland	2017	1	0
Scotland	2018	6	0
Total		42	0

== Honours ==
Rangers

- Scottish Premier League / Scottish Premiership: 2008–09, 2009–10, 2010–11, 2020–21
- Scottish Cup: 2001–02, 2002–03, 2008–09, 2021–22
- Scottish League Cup: 2001–02, 2002–03, 2007–08, 2009–10, 2010–11; runner-up: 2008–09, 2019–20
- UEFA Cup / UEFA Europa League runner-up: 2007–08, 2021–22

Hull City

- Football League Championship play-offs: 2016
- FA Cup runner-up: 2013–14

Scotland U16s

- Victory Shield: 1997–98

Individual

- Scottish Premier League Player of the Month: September 2006, April 2011
- PFA Scotland Team of the Year: 2008–09 SPL, 2009–10 SPL, 2010–11 SPL, 2018–19 Scottish Premiership, 2020–21 Scottish Premiership
- SFWA International Player of the Year: 2010–11
- SPFL Premiership Player of the Year: 2020–21
- Rangers Hall of Fame: 2023
