= Chris Burke (footballer) =

Scottish footballer (born 1983)

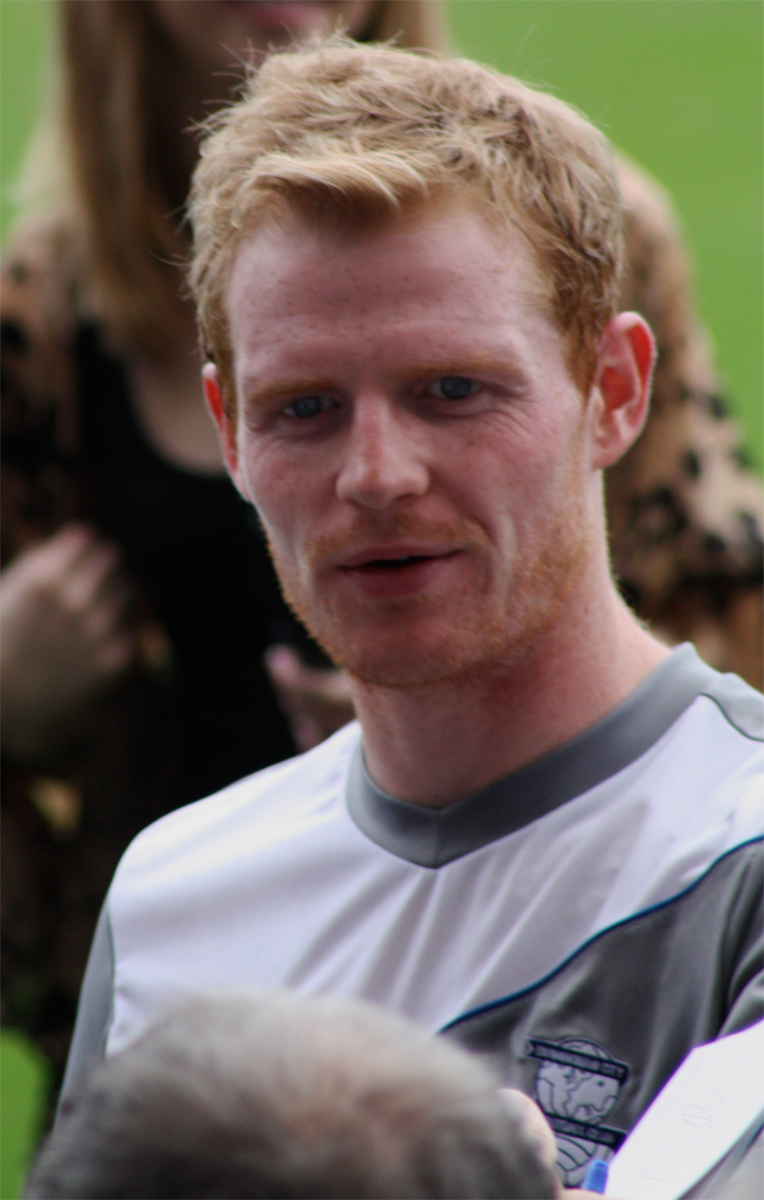
- With Birmingham City in 2011 pre-season

Personal information
- Full name: Christopher Robert Burke
- Date of birth: 2 December 1983 (age 42)
- Place of birth: Glasgow, Scotland
- Position: Winger

Team information
- Current team: Brentford B (assistant head coach); Scotland U19 (assistant head coach)

Youth career
- 1993–2000: Celtic Boys Club
- 2000–2002: Rangers

Senior career*
Years	Team	Apps	(Gls)
2002–2009	Rangers	96	(11)
2009–2011	Cardiff City	102	(15)
2011–2014	Birmingham City	131	(25)
2014–2016	Nottingham Forest	50	(6)
2016	→ Rotherham United (loan)	5	(2)
2016–2017	Ross County	6	(1)
2017–2022	Kilmarnock	147	(21)
Total		537	(81)

International career
2004–2005	Scotland U21	2	(0)
2009	Scotland B	1	(0)
2006–2014	Scotland	7	(2)

Managerial career
- 2022–2025: Kilmarnock (reserve, U19, U18)
- * Club domestic league appearances and goals

Christopher Robert Burke (born 2 December 1983) is a Scottish professional football coach and former player who is currently an assistant head coach of Brentford B and Scotland U19. As a player, her was primarily deployed as a right-winger, but also played on the left wing.

Burke began his career with Scottish Premier League club Rangers, playing in 131 games, but without establishing himself as a regular first team player. He then played 118 matches over two-and-a-half seasons at Championship club Cardiff City, followed by 155 matches over three seasons at the same level for Birmingham City. He then made 50 league appearances over two seasons for Nottingham Forest. He left Forest after a brief loan spell with Rotherham United. Burke returned to Scottish football in September 2016, signing for Ross County. After one season there he signed for Kilmarnock, where he made nearly 150 league appearances across five seasons.

Burke was capped by Scotland seven times at full international level, and scored two goals on his Scotland debut, a Kirin Cup match against Bulgaria in 2006. In addition to this, he has also appeared once for the Scotland B team, and twice for the Scotland under-21 team.

After retiring as a player in 2022, Burke served as reserve, U18 and intermediates coach at Kilmarnock. He progressed into the roles of U19 head coach and Head of Development and was appointed assistant coach of Scotland U19 in August 2024. Burke was appointed assistant head coach of Brentford B in October 2025.

== Club career ==
=== Rangers ===
Born in Glasgow and brought up in the city's Gorbals district, Burke is a product of Rangers' youth system having joined on 5 July 2000, but he had previously played for Celtic Boys Club. He first broke into the Rangers first team in the 2001–02 season and scored on his début against Kilmarnock on 20 March 2002. He became a regular player in the Rangers squad and was involved in the club's 2003–04 Champions League campaign. In the opening game of the 2004–05 season at Aberdeen, Burke fainted on the pitch and was out of action for almost the whole season with a mysterious virus.

However, he came back strongly and played in most Rangers games in 2005–06, including vital Champions League games against Internazionale, Porto and Villarreal. He was voted as both Supporters' and Players' Player of the Year, while also picking up an accolade from John Greig. Burke was injured against Celtic on 23 September 2006, damaging ligaments in his left shoulder in a challenge with Aiden McGeady. The injury required an operation and Burke was ruled out of action for an estimated three months.

On 25 January 2007, Burke signed a new contract with Rangers keeping him at the club until 2009. After being frozen out of the first team squad for the first half of the 2007–08 season, Burke returned to replace the injured Nacho Novo and DaMarcus Beasley, keeping his place in the side until April 2008, when he himself was injured in a Scottish Cup match against St Johnstone.

=== Cardiff City ===
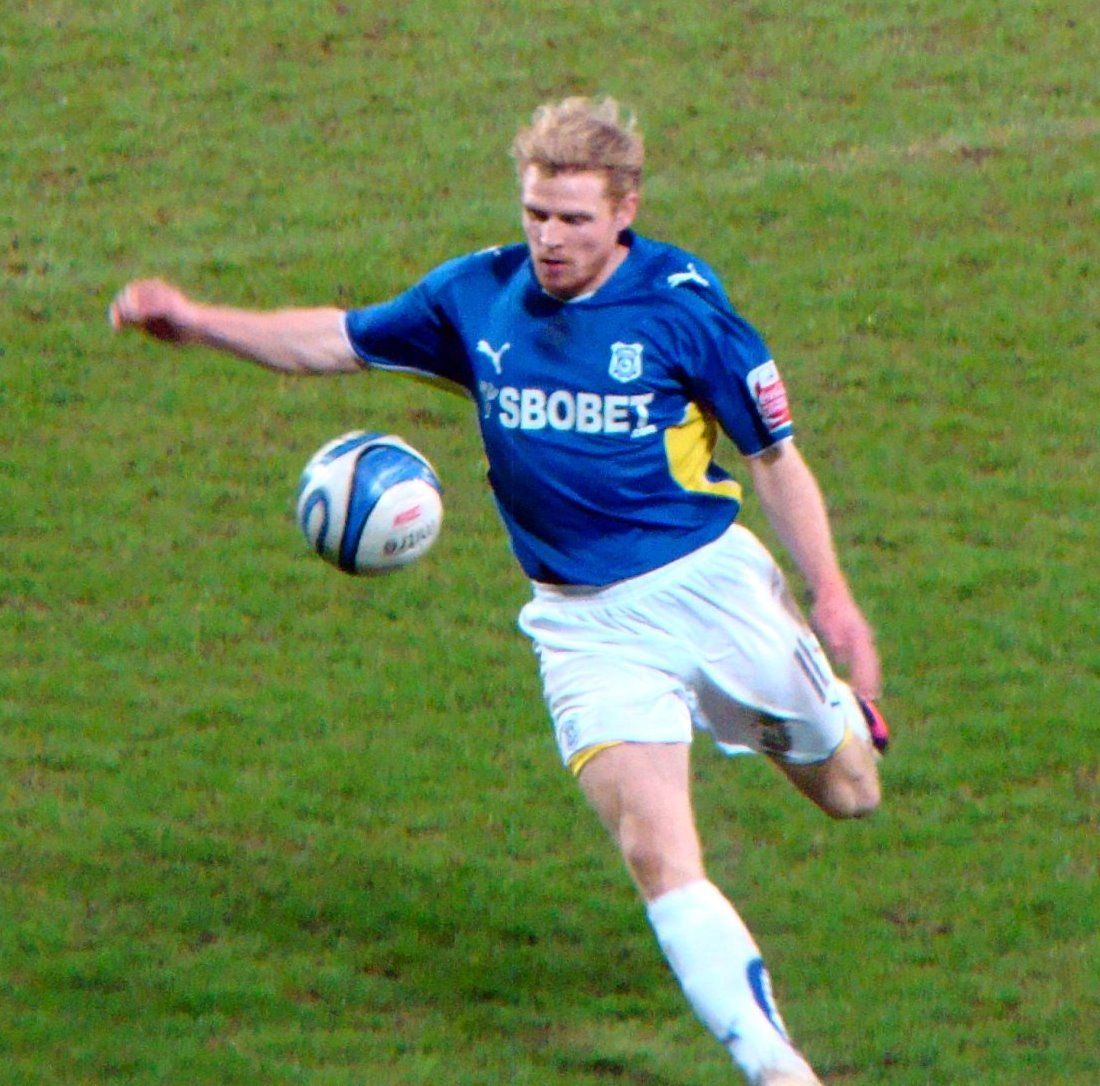
Playing for Cardiff City, 2010

After making just two appearances for Rangers during the first half of the 2008–09 season, Burke left the club on 9 January to sign for Football League Championship side Cardiff City on a free transfer, linking up with former Rangers teammates Gavin Rae and Ross McCormack. He made his debut on 17 January when he replaced Peter Whittingham after 45 minutes of a 1–1 draw with Birmingham City, and scored his first goal for the club on 21 April during a 2–2 draw with Charlton Athletic.

Burke scored his first goal of the 2009–10 season on 16 September, in a 1–0 win over Reading at the Madejski Stadium. His second, two weeks later, came in a 6–1 thrashing of Derby County at the Cardiff City Stadium. In December, he scored in three consecutive matches, including winning goals against Preston North End and Middlesbrough, and on 27 March 2010, Burke reached ten goals in all competitions with a goal against Crystal Palace, leading manager Dave Jones to describe him as being "an integral part of what we do". On 23 May 2011, Burke left Cardiff City after failing to agree a new contract.

=== Birmingham City ===
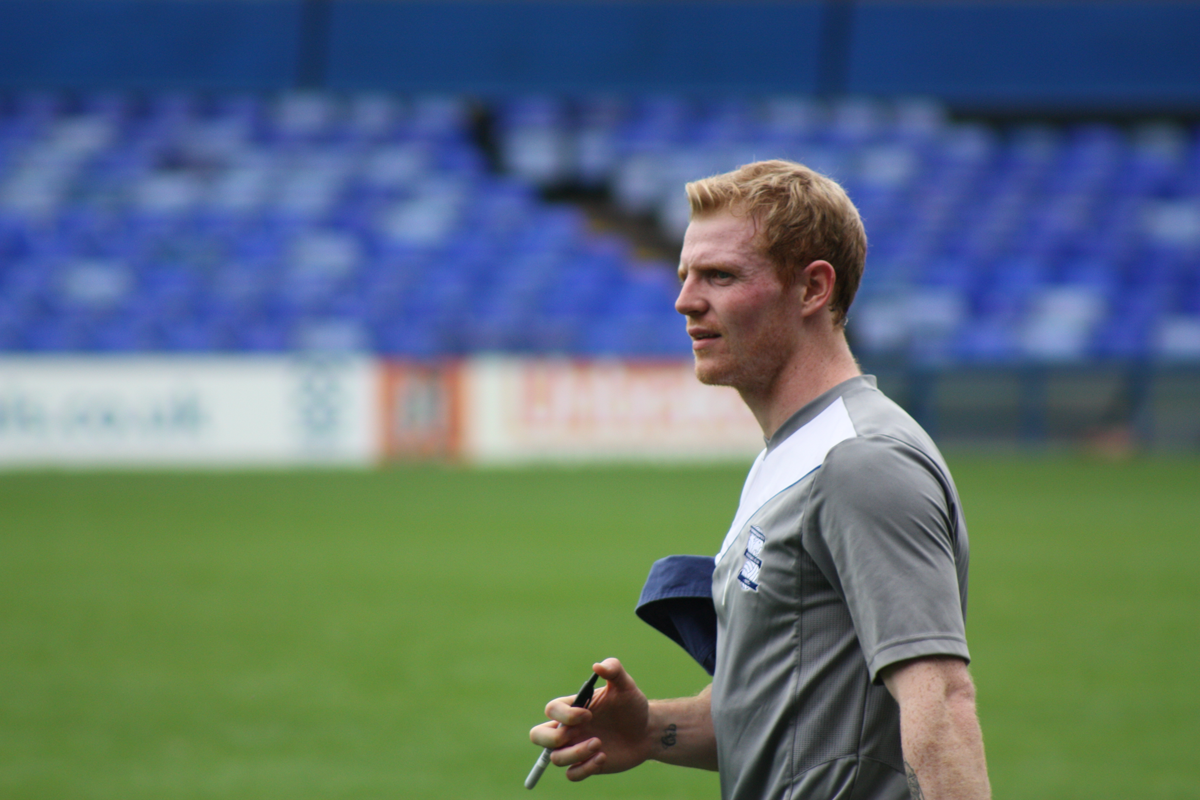
Training with Birmingham City, 2011

On 8 June 2011, Burke signed a pre-contract agreement with fellow Championship club Birmingham City. He joined the club formally on a two-year deal on 1 July, having left Cardiff on a free transfer under the Bosman ruling. He made his Birmingham debut on the opening day of the season in a 2–1 defeat to Derby County, and came close to equalising in the second half when his shot after a fine solo run beat the goalkeeper but rebounded back into play off the post. Burke was part of the starting eleven in Birmingham's first match in major European competition for nearly 50 years, the Europa League play-off round first leg against Portuguese club Nacional, which finished goalless. He featured in 61 of the club's 62 competitive games as they reached the play-offs, scoring 14 goals and making 19 assists, and won the club's Player of the Year award, as well as the Players' and Junior Blues' Player of the Year awards.

At the end of the 2012–13 season, the club took up their option to extend Burke's contract for a further year. He left the club when that contract expired.

=== Nottingham Forest ===
Burke signed a two-year deal with Championship club Nottingham Forest on 29 July 2014. He scored on his debut, curling the second goal in from the edge of the box in the 30th minute of a 2–0 win over Blackpool in Forest's first game of the season, and started Forest's first eight league games of the new season. His second goal, in new manager Dougie Freedman's first home match in charge, was Forest's second in a 3–0 win over Wigan Athletic in February 2015, and he also scored in his next two appearances, against Lancashire clubs Blackpool and Bolton Wanderers.

==== Rotherham United loan ====
Burke joined fellow Championship club Rotherham United on 22 January 2016 on loan until the end of the season. He made his debut the following day against Cardiff City, and scored his first goal for the club a week later in a 4–1 defeat against Charlton Athletic.

On his return to Nottingham Forest, Burke was released at the end of his contract.

=== Ross County ===
In September 2016, Burke signed a contract to the end of the 2016–17 season with Scottish Premiership club Ross County. His time there was again hampered by the effects of a virus.

=== Kilmarnock ===
Burke signed a one-year contract with Kilmarnock in July 2017. On 25 October he scored a stoppage-time goal to earn his side a point in a league match away to former club Rangers. He signed a further one-year contract with Kilmarnock on 22 June 2018. His second goal for the club came eleven months after his first: a "brilliant long-range howitzer" to level the scores in a home league fixture against Celtic on 23 September 2018, which Kilmarnock won 2–1. He scored against Rangers again on the final day of the 2018–19 Scottish Premiership season, as Killie secured third place, their highest position in over 50 years.

Burke left Kilmarnock after the 2021–22 season, in which the club won promotion back to the Scottish Premiership, but then returned as a reserve, U18 and intermediates coach.

== International career ==
Burke won his first Scotland cap on 11 May 2006 as a substitute against Bulgaria in the Kirin Cup and scored twice in a 5–1 victory.

After six years without international recognition, Burke was named in Gordon Strachan's first squad in January 2013. According to Strachan, "Chris was fantastic in the Europa League at a good level, he has a maturity about his play now. In the international set-up you need to be able to beat people by passing or eliminating people by going past them. He can certainly do the second part and is getting better at the first. International defences are so good, you need people like that."

== Other ventures ==
Along with Curtis Davies and Gavin Rae, Burke co-founded and was a director of the clothing company Seven One Zero, which was voluntarily dissolved in 2018.

== Career statistics ==
=== Club ===
As of end of 2021–22 season

Appearances and goals by club, season and competition
Club	Season	League			National cup		League cup		Continental		Other		Total	
Club	Season	Division	Apps	Goals	Apps	Goals	Apps	Goals	Apps	Goals	Apps	Goals	Apps	Goals
Rangers	2001–02	Scottish Premier League	2	1	0	0	0	0	0	0	—		2	1
Rangers	2002–03	Scottish Premier League	0	0	0	0	0	0	0	0	—		0	0
Rangers	2003–04	Scottish Premier League	20	3	1	0	2	1	3 (Note: Appearances in UEFA Champions League)	0	—		26	4
Rangers	2004–05	Scottish Premier League	12	0	0	0	1	0	3 (Note: Appearances in UEFA Cup)	0	—		16	0
Rangers	2005–06	Scottish Premier League	27	3	2	0	0	0	6	0	—		35	3
Rangers	2006–07	Scottish Premier League	22	2	1	0	1	0	5	0	—		29	2
Rangers	2007–08	Scottish Premier League	11	2	5	2	3	0	2	0	—		21	4
Rangers	2008–09	Scottish Premier League	2	0	—		0	0	0	0	—		2	0
Rangers	Total		96	11	9	2	7	1	19	0	0	0	131	14
Cardiff City	2008–09	Championship	14	1	2	0	—		—		—		16	1
Cardiff City	2009–10	Championship	44	9	3	1	2	0	—		3 (Note: Appearances in Football League Championship play-offs)	0	52	10
Cardiff City	2010–11	Championship	44	5	2	0	2	0	—		2	0	50	5
Cardiff City	Total		102	15	7	1	4	0	0	0	5	0	118	16
Birmingham City	2011–12	Championship	46	13	4	0	1	0	8 (Note: Appearances in UEFA Europa League)	1	2	0	61	14
Birmingham City	2012–13	Championship	41	8	2	0	2	0	—		—		45	8
Birmingham City	2013–14	Championship	44	4	2	2	3	0	—		—		49	6
Birmingham City	Total		131	25	8	2	6	0	8	1	2	0	155	28
Nottingham Forest	2014–15	Championship	41	6	1	0	2	0	—		—		44	6
Nottingham Forest	2015–16	Championship	9	0	0	0	1	0	—		—		10	0
Nottingham Forest	Total		50	6	1	0	3	0	0	0	0	0	54	6
Rotherham United (loan)	2015–16	Championship	5	2	—		—		—		—		5	2
Ross County	2016–17	Scottish Premiership	6	1	0	0	0	0	—		—		6	1
Kilmarnock	2017–18	Scottish Premiership	20	1	1	0	4	1	—		—		25	2
Kilmarnock	2018–19	Scottish Premiership	35	5	3	1	4	0	—		—		42	6
Kilmarnock	2019–20	Scottish Premiership	26	5	2	0	2	0	2	0	—		32	5
Kilmarnock	2020–21	Scottish Premiership	37	9	3	0	1	0	—		2 (Note: Appearances in Scottish Premiership play-offs)	0	43	9
Kilmarnock	2021–22	Scottish Championship	29	1	2	0	5	1	—		2 (Note: Appearances in Scottish Challenge Cup)	0	38	2
Kilmarnock	Total		147	21	11	1	16	2	2	0	4	0	180	24
Career total			537	81	36	6	36	3	29	1	11	0	649	91

=== International ===
As of 29 October 2018

International statistics
National team	Year	Apps	Goals
Scotland	2006	2	2
Scotland	2007	—	
Scotland	2008	—	
Scotland	2009	—	
Scotland	2010	—	
Scotland	2011	—	
Scotland	2012	—	
Scotland	2013	4	0
Scotland	2014	1	0
Total		7	2

Scores and results list Scotland's goal tally first.

#	Date	Venue	Opponent	Score	Result	Competition	Ref
1.	11 May 2006	Kobe, Japan	Bulgaria	4–1	5–1	Kirin Cup	
2.	11 May 2006	Kobe, Japan	Bulgaria	5–1	5–1	Kirin Cup	

== Honours ==
Rangers

- Scottish Premier League: 2004–05
- Scottish League Cup: 2007–08

Scotland

- Kirin Cup: 2006
