= Makhtar N'Diaye =

Senegalese footballer (born 1981)

Makhtar N'Diayé
Personal information
- Full name: Amadou Makhtar N'Diayé
- Date of birth: 31 December 1981 (age 44)
- Place of birth: Dakar, Senegal
- Position: Midfielder

Senior career*
Years	Team	Apps	(Gls)
1999–2005	Rennes	58	(7)
2003–2004	→ Sedan (loan)	24	(1)
2005–2006	Yverdon-Sport	21	(0)
2006–2007	Rangers	3	(0)
Total		106	(8)

International career
2002	Senegal	14	(0)
- * Club domestic league appearances and goals

Amadou Makhtar N'Diayé (born 31 December 1981) is a Senegalese former professional footballer who played as a midfielder.

He made fourteen appearances for his country at international level in 2002, notably participating in the 2002 FIFA World Cup.

== Career ==
N'Diayé was initially on trial at Scottish Premier League club Rangers, managed by his former Rennes boss Paul Le Guen, throughout the summer of 2006, and joined them on their tour of South Africa, before being signed to a one-year contract after impressing. N'Diaye has been capped 14 times for his country and played at the highest level. N'Diaye also had an unsuccessful trial with Grimsby Town in 2005.

N'Diayé left Rangers at the end of the 2006–07 season after failing to win a new contract. He did not play a single match under new boss Walter Smith. He has previously played for Stade Rennais and CS Sedan Ardennes in France and Yverdon-Sport FC in Switzerland.

Dundee took N'Diayé on as a trialist in the summer of 2008 during a pre-season tour of England. However, they dropped their interest in the player after he broke his arm in a game against Bradford City.
