= Saša Papac =

Bosnian footballer (born 1980)

Personal information
- Date of birth: 7 February 1980 (age 46)
- Place of birth: Mostar, SFR Yugoslavia
- Height: 1.85 m (6 ft 1 in)
- Position: Left-back

Team information
- Current team: Bosnia and Herzegovina (scout)

Senior career*
Years	Team	Apps	(Gls)
2000–2001	Široki Brijeg	14	(1)
2001–2004	Kärnten	95	(3)
2004–2006	Austria Wien	58	(2)
2006–2012	Rangers	161	(6)
Total		328	(12)

International career
2000–2001	Bosnia and Herzegovina U21	7	(0)
2001–2012	Bosnia and Herzegovina	39	(0)
- * Club domestic league appearances and goals

Saša Papac (born 7 February 1980) is a Bosnian former professional footballer, who played as a left-back. He was capped 39 times for the Bosnia and Herzegovina national team.

== Club career ==
=== Early career ===
Papac started his career with Široki Brijeg in the Bosnian Premier League in 2000. He made fourteen league appearances, scoring once for the club.

He then moved to Austria with Kärnten a year later. Papac spent three years with Kärnten, making 100 appearances and scoring on three occasions. When Kärnten were relegated from the Austrian Bundesliga in 2004 he joined Austria Wien. While in Vienna he made 76 appearances (with three goals) and won the league in 2006. He was also part of the side which won successive Austrian Cups in 2005 and 2006.

=== Rangers ===
He signed for Rangers on 31 August 2006 for a fee of £450,000. He became Rangers' third signing from Austria Vienna in the 2006 summer transfer window, after Libor Sionko and Filip Šebo. Papac made his debut for Rangers on 17 September 2006, coming on as a half time substitute for Steven Smith in a Scottish Premier League game against Hibernian. The side went on to lose the match 2–1.

With the arrival of Walter Smith in January 2007, Papac lost his place in the first team. He struggled to get into the side, making only one appearance in over two months, but returned towards the end of the season on the left side of defence. He was linked with a move to French club Saint-Etienne in the summer but rejected it in order to claim a first-team spot.

He spent the early part of his career as a central defender but during his six-year stint at Rangers developed into a left-back. In the 2007–08 season Papac was a regular at left-back and played in the Scottish Cup, League Cup and UEFA Cup finals. Papac netted his first goal for Rangers on his 83rd appearance for the club, during a league match against Dundee United on 4 November 2008. He signed a two-year contract extension in November 2008 that would keep him at the club until the summer of 2011. In season 2008–09, Papac made 39 appearances and won both the League and Scottish Cup. Papac made 46 appearances the following season and won the League for the second consecutive time along with the League Cup.

During an Old Firm defeat to Celtic on 2 March 2011, Papac was knocked out after being hit in the face by a strike from Mark Wilson. Papac signed a new one-year contract extension with Rangers just two days after helping the club to a third consecutive championship.

On 4 May 2012, Papac revealed that he would be leaving Rangers at the end of the season.

=== Retirement ===
On 28 August 2012, Papac announced his retirement from professional football for health reasons, after failing to recover properly from a groin injury.

== International career ==
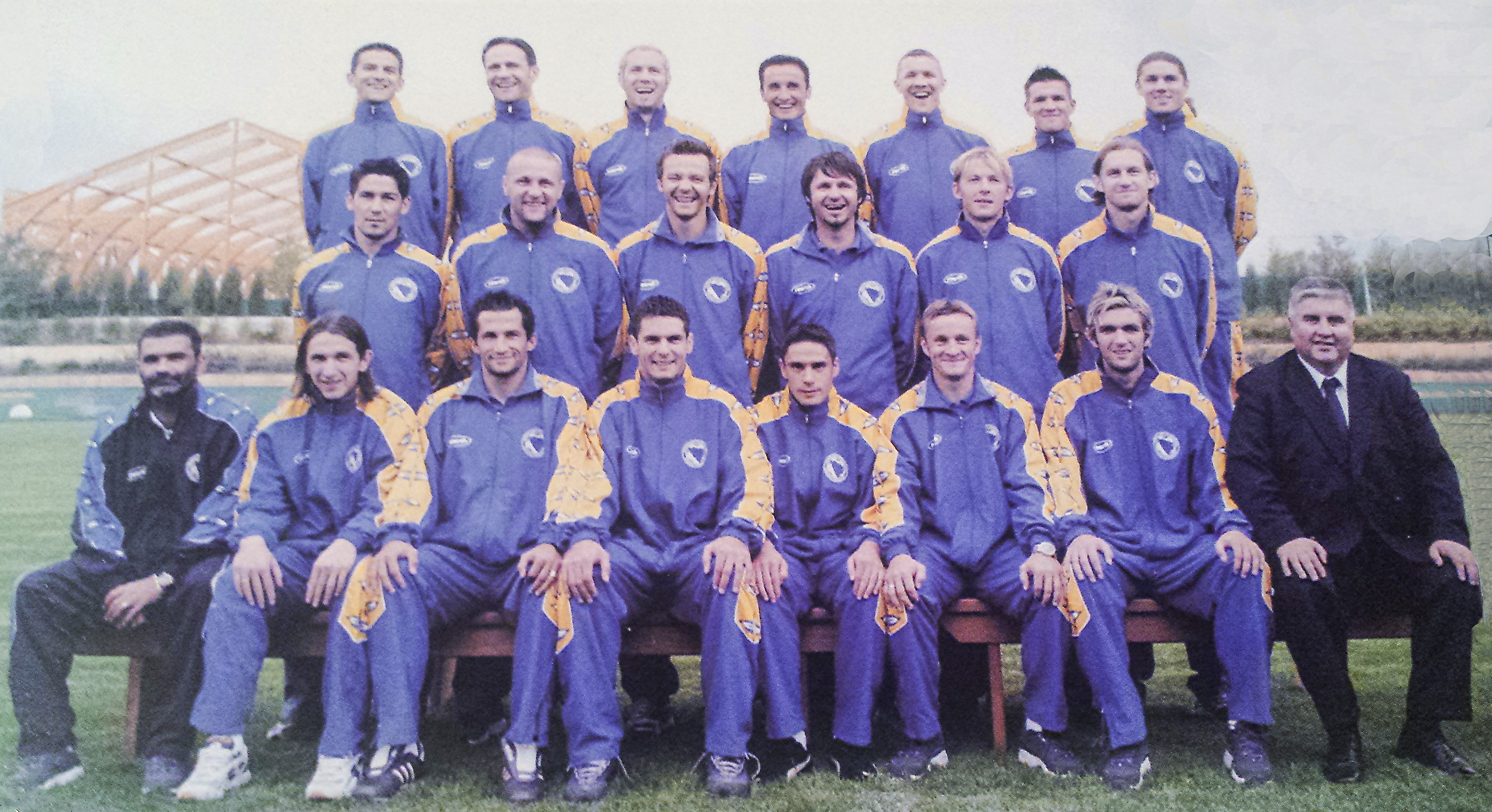
Bosnia and Herzegovina squad during UEFA Euro 2004 qualifying.

Papac made his debut on 12 January 2001, against Bangladesh at the Sahara Millennium Cup but quit in March 2007, citing problems with the staff at the Bosnian FA. He played his last match versus Greece before quitting the national team in October 2006. In January 2008, he decided to return to the international set-up under new boss Meho Kodro. Shortly after Kodro's dismissal, he was called up by new coach Miroslav Blažević but refused to come and retired from international football claiming it was to give space to new young players. However, in 2010 it emerged that Papac could make a return to the national team. In June 2011, Glasgow newspaper The Herald reported Papac was returning to international football.

On 1 July 2011, Papac confirmed that he would return to play for the national team. His final international was a February 2012 friendly match against Brazil.

In 2015, he was hired as a scout for the Bosnian national team.

== Executive career ==
On 15 November 2017, Papac was announced as the new sporting director of Bosnian Premier League side Željezničar. He left the club on 1 June 2018, after opting not to extended his contract.

== Career statistics ==
=== Club ===
Appearances and goals by club, season and competition
Club	Season	League		Scottish Cup		League Cup		Europe		Total	
Club	Season	Apps	Goals	Apps	Goals	Apps	Goals	Apps	Goals	Apps	Goals
Rangers	2006–07	21	0	0	0	0	0	0	0	21	0
Rangers	2007–08	22	0	1	0	0	0	18	0	41	0
Rangers	2008–09	29	1	2	0	1	0	2	0	34	1
Rangers	2009–10	34	2	4	0	3	0	6	0	47	2
Rangers	2010–11	34	3	3	0	2	0	7	0	46	3
Rangers	2011–12	21	0	2	0	1	0	2	0	26	0
Rangers	Total	161	6	12	0	7	0	35	0	215	6

== Honours ==
=== Player ===
Austria Vienna

- Austrian Bundesliga: 2005–06
- Austrian Cup: 2004–05, 2005–06

Rangers

- Scottish Premier League: 2008–09, 2009–10, 2010–11
- Scottish Cup: 2007–08, 2008–09
- Scottish League Cup: 2007–08, 2009–10, 2010–11
- UEFA Cup runner-up: 2007–08
