= Yves Colleu =

French footballer (born 1961)

Personal information
- Date of birth: 29 January 1961 (age 65)
- Place of birth: Dinard, France
- Position: Midfielder

Senior career*
Years	Team	Apps	(Gls)
1980–1983	Saint-Étienne	21	(0)
1983–1984	Angoulême	25	(4)
1984–1985	Tours	9	(0)
1985–1989	Stade Quimperois		

Managerial career
- 1996–1997: Rennes
- 1997–2001: Rennes (assistant)
- 2002–2005: Lyon (assistant)
- 2006–2007: Rangers (assistant)
- 2007–2009: Paris Saint-Germain (assistant)
- 2009–2010: Cameroon (assistant)
- 2011–2015: Oman (assistant)
- * Club domestic league appearances and goals

Yves Colleu (born 29 January 1961) is a French former footballer who played as a midfielder. He played in Division 1 for Saint-Étienne and Tours and in Division 2 for Angoulême and Quimper. He managed Rennes in 1996–97, and served as assistant manager to Paul Le Guen at Rennes, Lyon, Scottish Premier League club Rangers, and the Cameroon and Oman national teams.
