= Antoine Ponroy =

French footballer (born 1986)

Personal information
- Date of birth: 15 April 1986 (age 40)
- Place of birth: Rouen, France
- Height: 1.85 m (6 ft 1 in)
- Position: Centre-back

Team information
- Current team: Fleury 91

Senior career*
Years	Team	Apps	(Gls)
2004–2006	Rennes B	35	(0)
2006–2007	Rangers	0	(0)
2007–2008	Cannes	26	(1)
2008–2009	Beauvais	27	(1)
2009–2011	Evian TG	28	(0)
2010–2011	→ Paris (loan)	33	(2)
2011–2012	Laval	3	(0)
2012–2013	Vannes	30	(2)
2013–2016	Orléans	57	(3)
2016–2018	Bourg-Péronnas	42	(1)
2018–	Fleury 91	1	(0)
- * Club domestic league appearances and goals as of 12:02, 19 August 2018 (UTC)

Antoine Ponroy (born 15 April 1986) is a French footballer who currently plays as a centre-back for FC Fleury 91.
