= William Stanger (footballer) =

French footballer (born 1985)

Personal information
- Date of birth: 19 September 1985 (age 41)
- Place of birth: Quimper, France
- Height: 1.80 m (5 ft 11 in)
- Position: Midfielder

Senior career*
Years	Team	Apps	(Gls)
2003–2006	Rennes B	30	(5)
2005–2006	Rennes	1	(0)
2006–2007	Rangers	0	(0)
2007–2008	Paris Saint-Germain B	16	(3)
2008–2010	AFC Compiègne	65	(12)
2010–2013	Vendée Poiré-sur-Vie	61	(9)
2013–2014	La Roche VF	25	(2)
2015–2016	FC Challans	20	(3)
Total		218	(34)
- * Club domestic league appearances and goals

William Stanger (born 19 September 1985) is a French former professional footballer who played as a midfielder.

== Career ==
Stanger joined Rangers in May 2006. He was signed by fellow countryman Paul Le Guen from Stade Rennais FC, along with Rennes youth team-mate Antoine Ponroy.

On 22 January 2007, he joined Swedish side GAIS for a week-long trial, but was not signed. He left Rangers by mutual consent on 8 February 2007, as he was not considered to feature in new manager Walter Smith's future plans. He played only one game for the squad during his time with the Rangers, on 14 December 2006 in a 2006–07 UEFA Cup game against FK Partizan.

He signed for PSG in October 2007, in August 2008 leave Paris and moved to AFC Compiègne. After two years with AFC Compiègne signed in summer 2010 with Vendée Poiré-sur-Vie.

In 2013, he joined ESOF Vendee La Roche sur Yon in CFA2.
