= Karl Svensson =

Swedish former professional footballer (born 1984)

Personal information
- Full name: Karl Wilhelm Svensson
- Date of birth: 21 March 1984 (age 42)
- Place of birth: Jönköping, Sweden
- Height: 1.89 m (6 ft 2 in)
- Position: Centre-back

Senior career*
Years	Team	Apps	(Gls)
2000–2002	Jönköpings Södra	36	(7)
2003–2006	IFK Göteborg	55	(5)
2006–2007	Rangers	27	(0)
2007–2009	Caen	7	(0)
2009–2011	IFK Göteborg	26	(0)
2012–2014	Jönköpings Södra	53	(0)
Total		204	(12)

International career
2001	Sweden U17	6	(0)
2003	Sweden U19	2	(0)
2004–2006	Sweden U21	17	(0)
2006	Sweden	1	(0)
- * Club domestic league appearances and goals

Karl Wilhelm Svensson (Swedish pronunciation: [ˈkɑːɭ ˈsvɛ̌nːsɔn]; born 21 March 1984) is a Swedish former professional footballer who played as a centre-back for Jönköpings Södra, IFK Göteborg, Rangers, and Caen. He won one cap for the Sweden national team and represented his country at the 2006 FIFA World Cup.

== Club career ==
=== Early career ===
Karl Svensson started off his professional career with his boyhood club Jönköpings Södra, and signed with the IFK Göteborg ahead of the 2003 Allsvenskan season. He was a part of the IFK Göteborg team that reached the 2004 Svenska Cupen final, but ultimately lost 3–1 to Djurgårdens IF. Svensson was sent off in the final after picking up two yellow cards.

=== Rangers ===
Svensson signed with the Scottish Glasgow-side Rangers on 26 May 2006 for an undisclosed fee on a three–year contract. The fee was reported to have been in the region of £600,000. He made his Rangers debut in the first match of the Scottish Premier League that season, a 2–1 victory away against Motherwell. He made a total of 27 Scottish Premier League appearances during his time with the Rangers, but rarely played from February 2007 and onward.

=== Caen ===
On 27 June 2007, Svensson signed a three–year contract with French side Caen, newly promoted to Ligue 1. His time in France was plagued with injuries and little playing time.

=== Return to Sweden ===
On 19 January 2009, Svensson signed a four–year contract with his former club IFK Göteborg. On 23 December 2011, he signed a three-year contract with his hometown club Jönköpings Södra IF in the Swedish second division, Superettan. Svensson retired from professional football after the 2014 Superettan season.

== International career ==
After having represented the Sweden national U17, U19, and U21 teams, Svensson made his first and only full international appearance for the Sweden national team in January 2006 against Saudi Arabia. He was a part of Sweden's 2006 FIFA World Cup squad, but did not play.
