= Adam Owen =

Welsh football coach (born 1980)

Personal information
- Date of birth: 5 September 1980 (age 46)
- Place of birth: Wrexham, Wales
- Positions: Defender; midfielder

Team information
- Current team: Blackburn Rovers (Technical Director)

Youth career
- Wrexham

Senior career*
Years	Team	Apps	(Gls)
1994–2002	Wrexham		
1999–2000	Newtown		
2000–2001	Connah's Quay		
2001–2003	Cefn Druids		
2004–2005	East Stirlingshire		

Managerial career
- 2003–2006: Celtic
- 2006–2007: Sheffield Wednesday
- 2007–2013: Rangers
- 2008–2018: Wales
- 2013–2014: Sheffield Utd
- 2014–2017: Servette
- 2017–2018: Lechia Gdańsk
- 2018–2019: Hebei China Fortune
- 2019–2021: Seattle Sounders
- 2022–2023: Hibernian
- 2021–2024: Lech Poznań
- 2024–: Blackburn Rovers
- * Club domestic league appearances and goals

Adam Owen (born 5 September 1980) is a Welsh professional football coach, former player and technical director. He is currently working as Technical Director at EFL Championship club Blackburn Rovers.

== Playing career ==
Owen was born and raised in Wrexham, North Wales. He signed as a professional player for Wrexham upon leaving school at the age of 16. After a loan spells at Newtown in the Welsh Premier League, he played for various clubs in the Welsh Premier League such as Connah's Quay and Cefn Druids. He also played for Scottish club East Stirlingshire during the 2005–06, season making 13 league appearances in the Scottish Football League.

== Coaching career ==
Owen started his coaching career at Wrexham whilst still playing. Upon leaving Wrexham, he joined Scottish club Celtic. Following a two-year period working at Celtic Park under Martin O'Neill and Gordon Strachan as both Fitness and Academy Technical Coach, at the age of 25 years old, Owen joined Paul Sturrock's management team at Sheffield Wednesday, where he remained for 12 months in the English Championship, also working under Brian Laws. During his time at Hillsborough, Owen was approached and accepted the Head of Performance position at Rangers.

Following seven years at Rangers, he moved to English club Sheffield United in May 2013 to take up the role of assistant manager. After twelve months in Sheffield, in the summer of 2014, Owen left to join Swiss club Servette on a three-year contract, adding a promotion and league championship at his time with the club.

After completing his contract with Servette, Owen joined Polish Ekstraklasa club Lechia Gdańsk at the end of June 2017, becoming the head coach. He left his position in March 2018, citing a change of club philosophy as the reason.

Following Lechia Gdańsk, Owen again joined up with Chris Coleman, signing a two-year contract as his assistant coach at Hebei China Fortune in the Chinese Super League, with Hebei CCFC narrowly missing out on the Asian Champions League places, having risen through the league. In January 2020, it was announced that having been approached, Owen accepted the dual-role as High-Performance and Technical Advisor with the 2019 Major League Soccer champions Seattle Sounders. During this period, the Seattle Sounders were Western Conference Champions and finalists in the 2020 MLS Cup, as well as competing in the CONCACAF Champions League. Upon resigning his position to return to Europe, he moved directly into a technical advisor role with European club Lech Poznań.

In June 2022, he joined Scottish club Hibernian as assistant manager, whilst maintaining his role as technical advisor with Lech Poznań. Owen left Hibernian in August 2023 after helping the club to a fifth place SPL league position, and qualifying for the UEFA Europa Conference League in order to resume his technical role with Lech Poznań. In the summer of 2024, Owen completed a move to Blackburn Rovers.

== International work ==
Owen was a part of the Wales management staff from August 2009 until March 2018, initially working under both Brian Flynn and Gary Speed. He was part of Chris Coleman's 2016 European Championships management staff reaching the semi-final stage. Owen remained in the Wales backroom team under new manager Ryan Giggs, but left his position following their 2018 China Cup Final appearance against Uruguay to relocate to the Chinese Super League.

== Additional ==
Apart from his main coaching and performance positions, Owen held a role with Portuguese club Benfica as a Director of Research. He is author of the book Football Conditioning: A Modern Scientific Approach.

He attained a Ph.D. in Sport and Exercise Science & Coaching from the Université de Lyon, France. He also holds positions as an associate researcher role with the Université de Lyon, whilst working as a high-performance and elite coach educator for various UEFA member associations, including the England Football Association.

== Honours ==
=== Coaching ===
==== Club ====
Rangers

- Scottish Premier League: 2008–09, 2009–10, 2010–11
- Scottish Third Division: 2012–13
- Scottish Cup: 2007–08, 2008–09
- Scottish League Cup: 2007–08, 2009–10, 2010–11
- UEFA Cup Finalist: 2007–08

Servette

- Swiss Promotion League: 2015–16

Seattle Sounders

- MLS Cup: Finalist 2020

Lech Poznań

- Ekstraklasa Champions 2021–22

==== International ====
Wales

- China Cup: Finalist 2018
- 2016 European Championships: Semi Finalists
