= 2004–05 Rangers F.C. season =

Rangers
2004–05 season
- Chairman: John McClelland (until 1 September); David Murray (from 1 September)
- Manager: Alex McLeish
- Ground: Ibrox Stadium
- Scottish Premier League: 1st (champions)
- Scottish Cup: Third round
- League Cup: Winners
- Champions League: Third qualifying round
- UEFA Cup: Group stage
- Top goalscorer: League: Nacho Novo (19); All: Nacho Novo (25)
- Highest home attendance: 50,143 vs Hibernian (12 February)
- Lowest home attendance: 46,278 vs Kilmarnock (3 October)
Home colours	Away colours	Third colours

The 2004–05 season was the 125th season of competitive football by Rangers.

== Overview ==
Rangers played a total of 51 competitive matches during the 2004–05 season. They went into the season looking to recapture their Scottish Premier League crown, which Celtic had won the season before. Manager Alex McLeish made several summer signings, with the signature of Frenchman Jean-Alain Boumsong being his biggest coup. Others included strikers Dado Prso and Nacho Novo, as well as the experienced midfielder Alex Rae and future Ibrox favourite Marvin Andrews.

Rangers League form began poorly picking up only 8 points from their first 5 matches. Rangers lost the first Old Firm derby of the season 1–0 at Celtic Park and fell behind Celtic in the league. Rangers form improved following the loss to Celtic and they weren't to lose again in the league until April. This run of form included two wins over Celtic in November, once in the League Cup and the other in the League. They also ended a poor run of results at Celtic Park, with a 2–0 victory in February. A 2–1 loss to Celtic at home in April left Rangers five points behind with just four games left of the season. Celtic led by two points on the final day of the season and were winning 1–0 against Motherwell, but two late goals for Motherwell coupled with Rangers 1–0 win over Hibernian saw Rangers win the title, Helicopter Sunday.

Rangers also won the League Cup this season, with a 5–1 victory over Motherwell in the final. Rangers were beaten in the Scottish Cup however, losing 2–1 to Celtic in the third round.

After losing to CSKA Moscow in the third qualifying round of the Champions League, Rangers entered the UEFA Cup. Rangers managed to qualify for the newly formed group stages with a penalty shoot-out win over Maritimo. Rangers failed to progress beyond the group stages however, a 2–0 loss at home to Auxerre seeing them fail to stay in Europe beyond Christmas.

== Players ==
=== Squad information ===
N	Pos.	Nat.	Name	Age	Since	App	Goals	Ends	Transfer fee	Notes
1	GK	(Germany)	Stefan Klos (captain)	33	1998	296	0	2007	£0.7m	
2	DF	(Netherlands)	Fernando Ricksen	28	2000	254	20	2009	£3.75m	
3	DF	(Australia)	Craig Moore	29	1999 (Winter)	252	14	2006	Free	left on 3 January
4	DF	(France)	Jean-Alain Boumsong	25	2004	28	2	2009	Free	left on 2 January
4	MF	(Belgium)	Thomas Buffel	24	2005 (Winter)	18	5	2009	£2.3m	
5	DF	(Trinidad and Tobago)	Marvin Andrews	29	2004	38	4	2007	Free	
6	MF	(Scotland)	Barry Ferguson	27	2005 (Winter)	255	38	2010	£4.5m	
7	FW	(Georgia (country))	Shota Arveladze	32	2001	132	57	2005	£2m	
8	MF	(Scotland)	Alex Rae	37	2004	32	1	2006	Free	
9	FW	(Croatia)	Dado Pršo	30	2004	46	21	2007	Free	
10	FW	(Spain)	Nacho Novo	26	2004	48	26	2008	£0.45m	
11	MF	(Scotland)	Gavin Rae	27	2004 (Winter)	11	2	2007	£0.25m	
12	DF	(Scotland)	Bob Malcolm	24	1997	115	3	2007	Youth system	
14	MF	(Serbia and Montenegro)	Dragan Mladenović	29	2004	9	0	2008	£1.1m	
15	DF	(Georgia (country))	Zurab Khizanishvili	23	2003 (Winter)	63	0	2008	Free	
16	DF	(Italy)	Paolo Vanoli	32	2003	42	1	2005	Free	
16	DF	(Greece)	Sotirios Kyrgiakos	25	2005 (Winter)	17	2	2005	Loan	
17	MF	(Scotland)	Chris Burke	21	2000	44	5	2007	Youth system	
18	DF	(England)	Michael Ball	25	2001	72	2	2006	£4m	
19	FW	(Scotland)	Steven Thompson	21	2003 (Winter)	64	20	2006	£0.2m	
20	DF	(Scotland)	Alan Hutton	20	2002	24	1	2007	Youth system	
21	DF	(Scotland)	Maurice Ross	24	2000	107	3	2007	Youth system	
22	GK	(Scotland)	Allan McGregor	23	2001	11	0		Youth system	
23	MF	(Sweden)	Bojan Djordjic	23	2005 (Winter)	5	0	2005	Free	
24	DF	(France)	Grégory Vignal	23	2004	42	3	2005	Loan	
25	GK	(Netherlands)	Ronald Waterreus	34	2005 (Winter)	15	0	2006	£0.05m	
26	FW	(Denmark)	Peter Løvenkrands	25	2000	135	36	2006	£1.3m	
27	MF	(Scotland)	Stephen Hughes	22	1999	90	7		Youth system	left 31 January
31	MF	(Tunisia)	Hamed Namouchi	21	2003	35	6		Free	
37	DF	(Scotland)	Steven Smith	19	2002	4	0	2008	Youth system	
40	MF	(Scotland)	Charlie Adam	19	2003	3	0		Youth system	out on season loan
42	FW	(Scotland)	Robert Davidson	19	2004	2	0	2007	Youth system	
45	FW	(Scotland)	Ross McCormack	18	2003	3	1	2007	Youth system	

- Last updated: 22 May 2005
- Source: Players transfer, Wikipedia players' articles
- Ordered by position on pitch.

=== Transfers ===
==== In ====
Date	Player	From	Fee
25 June 2004	(Serbia and Montenegro) Dragan Mladenović	(Serbia and Montenegro) Red Star Belgrade	£1,000,000
1 July 2004	(France) Jean-Alain Boumsong	(France) Auxerre	Free
1 July 2004	(Croatia) Dado Pršo	(France) AS Monaco	Free
1 July 2004	(Scotland) Alex Rae	(England) Wolverhampton Wanderers	Free
1 July 2004	(Trinidad and Tobago) Marvin Andrews	(Scotland) Livingston	Free
6 July 2004	(Spain) Nacho Novo	(Scotland) Dundee	£450,000
5 August 2004	(France) Grégory Vignal	(England) Liverpool	Loan
18 August 2004	(Scotland) Derek Carcary	(Scotland) Queen's Park	Free
1 January 2005	(Sweden) Bojan Djordjic	(England) Manchester United	Free
5 January 2005	(Belgium) Thomas Buffel	(Netherlands) Feyenoord	£2,300,000
20 January 2005	(Greece) Sotirios Kyrgiakos	(Greece) Panathinaikos	£500,000 (on loan)
31 January 2005	(Netherlands) Ronald Waterreus	(England) Manchester City	£100,000
31 January 2005	(Scotland) Barry Ferguson	(England) Blackburn Rovers	£4,500,000

==== Out ====
Date	Player	To	Fee
3 May 2004	(Germany) Christian Nerlinger	(Germany) Kaiserslautern	Free
18 May 2004	(Brazil) Emerson	(Brazil) Vasco da Gama	Free
18 May 2004	(Portugal) Nuno Capucho	(Spain) Celta Vigo	Free
1 June 2004	(Norway) Henning Berg	Retired	
1 June 2004	(Netherlands) Michael Mols	(Netherlands) FC Utrecht	Free
1 June 2004	(Netherlands) Ronald de Boer	(Qatar) Al Rayyan	Free
1 June 2004	(Scotland) Billy Gibson	(Scotland) Partick Thistle	Free
23 June 2004	(Netherlands) Frank de Boer	(Qatar) Al Rayyan	Free
25 June 2004	(Scotland) Darryl Duffy	(Scotland) Falkirk	Free
7 July 2004	(Scotland) Steven MacLean	(England) Sheffield Wednesday	£125,000
8 July 2004	(Scotland) Peter Leven	(Scotland) Kilmarnock	Free
10 July 2004	(Spain) Mikel Arteta	(Spain) Real Sociedad	£2,600,000
13 July 2004	(Scotland) Paul McHale	(Scotland) Cowdenbeath	Free
26 July 2004	(Scotland) Andy Dowie	(Scotland) Partick Thistle	Free
11 August 2004	(Scotland) Allan McGregor	(Scotland) St Johnstone	Loan
31 August 2004	(Scotland) Charlie Adam	(Scotland) Ross County	Loan
31 August 2004	(Scotland) Tom Brighton	(England) Scunthorpe United	Loan
2 January 2005	(France) Jean-Alain Boumsong	(England) Newcastle United	£8,000,000
3 January 2005	(Australia) Craig Moore	(Germany) Borussia Mönchengladbach	Free
18 January 2005	(Italy) Paolo Vanoli	(Italy) Vicenza	Free
20 January 2005	(North Macedonia) Bajram Fetai	(Scotland) Inverness Caledonian Thistle	Loan
31 January 2005	(Scotland) Stephen Hughes	(England) Leicester City	£250,000
11 February 2005	(Serbia and Montenegro) Dragan Mladenović	(Spain) Real Sociedad	Loan

- Expenditure: ▼£8,950,000
- Income: ▲£10,975,000
- Total loss/gain: ▲£2,025,000

=== Squad statistics ===
				Total			SPL		SC		SL Cup		UCL		UC	
No.	Pos.	Nat.	Name	Sts	App	Gls	App	Gls	App	Gls	App	Gls	App	Gls	App	Gls
1	GK	(Germany)	Stefan Klos	34	34		23		1		2		2		6	
2	DF	(Netherlands)	Fernando Ricksen	51	51	9	38	4	1	1	4	3	2		6	1
3	DF	(Australia)	Craig Moore	6	6		3				1		1		1	
4	MF	(Belgium)	Thomas Buffel	15	18	5	15	4	1		2	1				
4	DF	(France)	Jean-Alain Boumsong	28	28	2	18	2			2		2		6	
5	DF	(Trinidad and Tobago)	Marvin Andrews	37	38	4	30	4	1		2		1		4	
6	MF	(Scotland)	Barry Ferguson	14	15	2	13	2			2					
7	FW	(Georgia (country))	Shota Arveladze	17	33	9	24	6			2	1	2		5	2
8	MF	(Scotland)	Alex Rae	22	32	1	25	1	1		3		1		2	
9	FW	(Croatia)	Dado Pršo	44	46	21	34	18	1		3	2	2		6	1
10	FW	(Spain)	Nacho Novo	45	48	25	35	19	1		4	3	2	1	6	2
12	DF	(Scotland)	Robert Malcolm	25	28	1	21	1			2				5	
14	MF	(Serbia and Montenegro)	Dragan Mladenović	8	9		7						1		1	
15	MF	(Georgia (country))	Zurab Khizanishvili	23	25		16		1		2		1		5	
16	DF	(Greece)	Sotirios Kyrgiakos	17	17	2	15				2	2				
16	DF	(Italy)	Paolo Vanoli	5	7		5				1				1	
17	MF	(Scotland)	Chris Burke	11	16		12				1				3	
18	DF	(England)	Michael Ball	15	18		14				2				2	
19	FW	(Scotland)	Steven Thompson	10	33	10	24	5	1		4	3	2	1	2	1
20	DF	(Scotland)	Alan Hutton	9	12		10				1				1	
21	DF	(Scotland)	Maurice Ross	19	19	1	14				2	1	1		2	
22	GK	(Scotland)	Allan McGregor	2	2		2									
23	MF	(Sweden)	Bojan Djordjic	5	5		4		1							
24	DF	(France)	Grégory Vignal	40	42	3	30	3	1		4		2		5	
25	GK	(Netherlands)	Ronald Waterreus	15	15		13				2					
27	MF	(Denmark)	Peter Løvenkrands	18	24	4	17	3			1		2		4	1
27	MF	(Scotland)	Stephen Hughes	7	15	2	11	2	1				1		2	
31	MF	(Tunisia)	Hamed Namouchi	17	26	3	20	2	1		1				4	1
37	DF	(Scotland)	Steven Smith	2	4		4									
40	MF	(Scotland)	Charlie Adam		1		1									
42	FW	(Scotland)	Robert Davidson		1		1									
45	FW	(Scotland)	Ross McCormack		1		1									

Last updated: 26 August 2015
Source: Wikipedia article
Ordered by position
0 shown as blank

== Club ==
=== Board of directors ===
Position	Staff
Chairman	(Scotland) John McClelland (until 1 September) (Scotland) David Murray (from 1 September)
Honorary chairman	(Scotland) David Murray (until 1 September)
Vice-chairman	(Scotland) John McClelland (from 1 September)
Chief executive	(Scotland) Martin Bain (from 11 February)
Director of Football Business	(Scotland) Martin Bain (until 11 February)
Director of Retail	(Scotland) Nick Peel (until 21 March)
Director of Finance	(Scotland) David Jolliffe
Company Secretary	(Scotland) Campbell Ogilvie
Non-executive director	(Scotland) John Greig
Non-executive director	(Scotland) Alastair Johnston
Non-executive director	(England) Daniel Levy (until 27 August)
Non-executive director	(Scotland) Dave King
Non-executive director	(Scotland) Donald Wilson

Source: Wikipedia article

=== Coaching staff ===
Position	Staff
Manager	(Scotland) Alex McLeish
Assistant Manager	(Scotland) Andy Watson
First-team coach	(Netherlands) Jan Wouters
Fitness coach	(Scotland) Frank Nuttall (from June)
Goalkeepers coach	(Scotland) Billy Thomson

Source: Wikipedia article

=== Other staff ===
Position	Staff
Physiotherapist	(Scotland) Davie Henderson
Doctor	(Scotland) Dr Iain McGuiness
Chief scout	(Scotland) Ewan Chester (until 29 June)
Team analyst	(Scotland) Steve Harvey
Massuer	(Scotland) David Lavery
Kit controller	(Scotland) Jimmy Bell

Source: Wikipedia article

== Matches ==
=== Friendlies ===
Game	Date	Tournament	Round	Ground	Opponent	Score^{1}	Report
1	18 July 2004	Friendly		A	SC Fürstenfeld	4–0	Report / Report link; Kick off / TBC BST; SC Fürstenfeld / Rangers; / McCormack; Novo (2); Løvenkrands
2	20 July 2004	Friendly		N	Roma	4–1	Report / Report link; Kick off / TBC BST; Attendance / 200; Roma / Rangers; de Rossi / Novo (2); Pršo (pen.); Rae
3	24 July 2004	Friendly		A	Fulham	1–0	Report / Report link; Kick off / TBC BST; Attendance / 14,173; Fulham / Rangers; / Pršo
4	28 July 2004	Walter Tull Memorial Cup		H	Tottenham Hotspur	2–0	Report / Report link; Kick off / 19:45 BST; Attendance / 35,750; Rangers / Tottenham Hotspur; Novo; Pršo
5	31 July 2004	Gateshead Cup		A	Newcastle United	2–4	Report / Report link; Kick off / 15:00 BST; Attendance / 31,554; Referee / Mark Halsey; Newcastle United / Rangers; 11' (pen.) Shearer; 29' Bellamy; 37' Bernard; 90' Dyer / 43' Pršo; 85' Ricksen
6	1 August 2004	Gateshead Cup		N	Feyenoord	0–0 (8-7 pen.)	Report / Report link; Kick off / BST; Attendance / 24,000; Referee / Mark Halsey

Last updated: 9 January 2005
Source: Wikipedia article
^{1}Rangers goals come first.
National flags for Ground and Opponent columns are only shown when different from that of Rangers.
M = Match; Ground: H = Home, A = Away, N = Neutral, HR = Home replacement, AR = Away replacement.

=== Scottish Premier League ===
Game	Date	Tournament	Round	Ground	Opponent	Score^{1}	Report
1	7 August 2004	Scottish Premier League	1	A	Aberdeen	0–0	Report / Report link; Kick off / 12:30 BST; Attendance / 19,028; Referee / Stuart Dougal (Scotland)
3	14 August 2004	Scottish Premier League	2	H	Livingston	4–0	Report / Report link; Kick off / 15:00 BST; Attendance / 48,102; Referee / Iain Brines (Scotland); Rangers / Livingston; 6' Pršo; 32' Hughes; 78' Hughes; 88' Arveladze
4	21 August 2004	Scottish Premier League	3	H	Hibernian	4–1	Report / Report link; Kick off / 15:00 BST; Attendance / 48,702; Referee / Kenny Clark (Scotland); Rangers / Hibernian; 11' Arveladze; 15' Pršo; 58' Boumsong; 84' Løvenkrands / 35' Caldwell
6	29 August 2004	Scottish Premier League	4	A	Celtic	0–1	Report / Report link; Kick off / 13:00 BST; Attendance / 58,935; Referee / Hugh Dallas (Scotland); Celtic / Rangers; 85' Thompson
7	12 September 2004	Scottish Premier League	5	A	Heart of Midlothian	0–0	Report / Report link; Kick off / TBC BST; Attendance / 14,601; Referee / Dougie McDonald (Scotland)
9	19 September 2004	Scottish Premier League	6	H	Inverness Caledonian Thistle	1–0	Report / Report link; Kick off / 15:00 BST; Attendance / 47,063; Referee / Calum Murray (Scotland); Rangers / Inverness Caledonian Thistle; 17' Pršo
11	26 September 2004	Scottish Premier League	7	A	Dundee	2–0	Report / Report link; Kick off / 14:00 BST; Attendance / 9,404; Referee / Stuart Dougal (Scotland); Dundee / Rangers; / 78' Novo; 80' Novo
13	3 October 2004	Scottish Premier League	8	H	Kilmarnock	2–0	Report / Report link; Kick off / 15:00 BST; Attendance / 46,278; Referee / Iain Brines (Scotland); Rangers / Kilmarnock; 10' Andrews; 82' Novo
14	17 October 2004	Scottish Premier League	9	A	Motherwell	2–0	Report / Report link; Kick off / 14:00 BST; Attendance / 10,946; Referee / John Rowbotham (Scotland); Motherwell / Rangers; / 7' Pršo; 83' Pršo
16	24 October 2004	Scottish Premier League	10	H	Dundee United	1–1	Report / Report link; Kick off / 15:00 BST; Attendance / 46,796; Referee / Steve Conroy (Scotland); Rangers / Dundee United; 69' Novo / 90' Robson
17	27 October 2004	Scottish Premier League	11	A	Dunfermline Athletic	2–1	Report / Report link; Kick off / 19:45 BST; Attendance / 8,678; Referee / John Underhill (Scotland); Dunfermline Athletic / Rangers; 22' Brewster / 47' Boumsong; 58' (pen.) Novo
18	31 October 2004	Scottish Premier League	12	H	Aberdeen	5–0	Report / Report link; Kick off / 14:00 GMT; Attendance / 48,918; Referee / Hugh Dallas (Scotland); Rangers / Aberdeen; 39' Thompson; 68' Løvenkrands; 75' Novo; 88' Ricksen; 90' (pen.) Novo
19	7 November 2004	Scottish Premier League	13	A	Livingston	4–1	Report / Report link; Kick off / 14:00 GMT; Attendance / 8,780; Referee / Dougie McDonald (Scotland); Livingston / Rangers; 61' Easton / 37' Løvenkrands; 55' Novo; 67' Thompson; 84' Namouchi
21	14 November 2004	Scottish Premier League	14	A	Hibernian	1–0	Report / Report link; Kick off / 14:00 GMT; Attendance / 13,829; Referee / Willie Young (Scotland); Hibernian / Rangers; (red card) 63' Caldwell / (red card) 28' Novo; 65' (pen.) Pršo
22	20 November 2004	Scottish Premier League	15	H	Celtic	2–0	Report / Report link; Kick off / 12:30 GMT; Attendance / 50,043; Referee / Kenny Clark (Scotland); Rangers / Celtic; 15' (pen.) Novo; 36' Pršo / (red card) 38' Thompson; (yellow card) 56' (red card) Sutton
24	28 November 2004	Scottish Premier League	16	H	Heart of Midlothian	3–2	Report / Report link; Kick off / 15:00 GMT; Attendance / 48,494; Referee / Dougie McDonald (Scotland); Rangers / Heart of Midlothian; 45' (o.g.) McAllister; 56' Novo; 81' Novo / 16' Hartley; 66' de Vries
26	5 December 2004	Scottish Premier League	17	A	Inverness Caledonian Thistle	1–1	Report / Report link; Kick off / 14:00 GMT; Attendance / 6,543; Referee / Craig Thomson (Scotland); Inverness Caledonian Thistle / Rangers; 3' Bayne / 51' Pršo
27	11 December 2004	Scottish Premier League	18	H	Dundee	3–0	Report / Report link; Kick off / 15:00 GMT; Attendance / 48,114; Referee / Mike McCurry (Scotland); Rangers / Dundee; 3' (pen.) Novo; 4' Pršo; 50' Malcolm
29	19 December 2004	Scottish Premier League	19	A	Kilmarnock	1–0	Report / Report link; Kick off / 14:00 GMT; Attendance / 11,156; Referee / Dougie McDonald (Scotland); Kilmarnock / Rangers; / 16' Arveladze
30	27 December 2004	Scottish Premier League	20	H	Motherwell	4–1	Report / Report link; Kick off / 15:00 GMT; Attendance / 49,909; Referee / Alan Freeland (Scotland); Rangers / Motherwell; 3' Novo; 15' Novo; 53' Arveladze; 86' Thompson / 49' McDonald
31	1 January 2005	Scottish Premier League	21	A	Dundee United	1–1	Report / Report link; Kick off / 15:00 GMT; Attendance / 10,461; Referee / Mike McCurry (Scotland); Dundee United / Rangers; 11' McCracken / 90' Namouchi
33	15 January 2005	Scottish Premier League	22	H	Dunfermline Athletic	3–0	Report / Report link; Kick off / 15:00 GMT; Attendance / 48,055; Referee / Charlie Richmond (Scotland); Rangers / Dunfermline Athletic; 6' Thompson; 38' Andrews; 64' Rae
34	23 January 2005	Scottish Premier League	23	A	Aberdeen	2–1	Report / Report link; Kick off / 14:00 GMT; Attendance / 17,495; Referee / Dougie McDonald (Scotland); Aberdeen / Rangers; 19' Mackie / 9' Pršo; 16' (o.g.) McNaughton
35	29 January 2005	Scottish Premier League	24	H	Livingston	3–0	Report / Report link; Kick off / 15:00 GMT; Attendance / 48,579; Referee / Kevin Toner (Scotland); Rangers / Livingston; 14' Pršo; 63' Novo; 68' Ricksen
37	12 February 2005	Scottish Premier League	25	H	Hibernian	3–0	Report / Report link; Kick off / 15:00 GMT; Attendance / 50,143; Referee / Craig Thomson (Scotland); Rangers / Hibernian; 35' Pršo; 50' Pršo; 61' Buffel
38	20 February 2005	Scottish Premier League	26	A	Celtic	2–0	Report / Report link; Kick off / 12:30 GMT; Attendance / 59,041; Referee / Mike McCurry (Scotland); Celtic / Rangers; / 71' Vignal; 82' Novo
39	26 February 2005	Scottish Premier League	27	H	Kilmarnock	2–1	Report / Report link; Kick off / 15:00 GMT; Attendance / 48,575; Referee / Steve Conroy (Scotland); Rangers / Kilmarnock; 29' Pršo; 41' Novo / 76' Boyd
40	2 March 2005	Scottish Premier League	28	A	Heart of Midlothian	2–1	Report / Report link; Kick off / 19:45 GMT; Attendance / 13,842; Referee / Hugh Dallas (Scotland); Heart of Midlothian / Rangers; 87' Burchill; (red card) 90' Mikoliūnas / 49' Novo; (yellow card) 90' (red card) Pršo; 90' (pen.) Ricksen
41	5 March 2005	Scottish Premier League	29	H	Inverness Caledonian Thistle	1–1	Report / Report link; Kick off / 15:00 GMT; Attendance / 49,345; Referee / Mike Ritchie (Scotland); Rangers / Inverness Caledonian Thistle; 57' Ferguson / 90+2' Prunty
42	13 March 2005	Scottish Premier League	30	A	Dundee	2–0	Report / Report link; Kick off / 14:00 GMT; Attendance / 9,876; Referee / Iain Brines (Scotland); Dundee / Rangers; / 82' Andrews; 84' Ricksen
44	3 April 2005	Scottish Premier League	31	A	Motherwell	3–2	Report / Report link; Kick off / 14:00 BST; Attendance / 10,210; Referee / Dougie McDonald (Scotland); Motherwell / Rangers; 71' (pen.) McBride; 84' Corrigan / 4' Vignal; 32' Vignal; 51' Pršo; (yellow card) 79' (red card) Ferguson
45	12 April 2005	Scottish Premier League	32	H	Dundee United	0–1	Report / Report link; Kick off / 19:45 BST; Attendance / 49,302; Referee / Iain Brines (Scotland); Rangers / Dundee United; / 8' Duff
46	17 April 2005	Scottish Premier League	33	A	Dunfermline Athletic	1–0	Report / Report link; Kick off / 14:00 BST; Attendance / 8,266; Referee / Kenny Clark (Scotland); Dunfermline Athletic / Rangers; / 7' Pršo
47	24 April 2005	Scottish Premier League	34	H	Celtic	1–2	Report / Report link; Kick off / 12:30 BST; Attendance / 49,593; Referee / Stuart Dougal (Scotland); Rangers / Celtic; 88' Thompson / 21' Petrov; 34' Bellamy
48	1 May 2005	Scottish Premier League	35	A	Aberdeen	3–1	Report / Report link; Kick off / 14:00 BST; Attendance / 17,198; Referee / Hugh Dallas (Scotland); Aberdeen / Rangers; 33' Clark / 10' Ferguson; 43' Pršo; 59' Pršo
49	7 May 2005	Scottish Premier League	36	H	Heart of Midlothian	2–1	Report / Report link; Kick off / 15:00 BST; Attendance / 49,342; Referee / Charlie Richmond (Scotland); Rangers / Heart of Midlothian; 9' Buffel; 42' Andrews / 84' (o.g.) Andrews
50	14 May 2005	Scottish Premier League	37	H	Motherwell	4–1	Report / Report link; Kick off / 15:00 BST; Attendance / 49,495; Referee / Calum Murray (Scotland); Rangers / Motherwell; 12' Buffel; 17' Arveladze; 54' Arveladze; 57' Buffel / 89' (o.g.) Andrews
51	22 May 2005	Scottish Premier League	38	A	Hibernian	1–0	Report / Report link; Kick off / 14:00 BST; Attendance / 17,450; Referee / Kenny Clark (Scotland); Hibernian / Rangers; / 59' Novo

Last updated: 22 May 2005
Source: Wikipedia article
^{1}Rangers goals come first.
National flags for Ground and Opponent columns are only shown when different from that of Rangers.
M = Match; Ground: H = Home, A = Away, N = Neutral, HR = Home replacement, AR = Away replacement.

=== Scottish League Cup ===
Game	Date	Tournament	Round	Ground	Opponent	Score^{1}	Report
10	22 September 2004	League Cup	R3	A	Aberdeen	2–0	Report / Report link; Kick off / 19:45 BST; Attendance / 14,876; Referee / Kenny Clark (Scotland); Aberdeen / Rangers; / 45' Ricksen; 89' Thompson; (yellow card) 90' (red card) Malcolm
20	10 November 2004	League Cup	QF	H	Celtic	2–1	Report / Report link; Kick off / 19:45 GMT; Attendance / 47,298; Referee / Stuart Dougal (Scotland); Rangers / Celtic; 85' Pršo; 100' Arveladze / 66' Hartson
36	2 February 2005	League Cup	SF	N	Dundee United	7–1	Report / Report link; Kick off / 19:45 GMT; Attendance / 25,622; Referee / Hugh Dallas (Scotland); Rangers / Dundee United; 7' Novo; 18' Pršo; 67' Buffel; 77' Ricksen; 80' Thompson; 85' Novo; 88' Thompson / 50' Scotland
43	20 March 2005	League Cup	F	N	Motherwell	5–1	Report / Report link; Kick off / 15:00 GMT; Attendance / 50,182; Referee / Mike McCurry (Scotland); Rangers / Motherwell; 5' Ross; 9' Kyrgiakos; 33' Ricksen; 48' Novo; 86' Kyrgiakos / 13' Partridge

Last updated: 20 March 2005
Source: Wikipedia article
^{1}Rangers goals come first.
National flags for Ground and Opponent columns are only shown when different from that of Rangers.
M = Match; Ground: H = Home, A = Away, N = Neutral, HR = Home replacement, AR = Away replacement.

=== Scottish Cup ===
Game

32
Date

9 January 2005
Tournament

Scottish Cup
Round

3
Ground

A
Opponent

Celtic
Score^{1}

1–2
Report

Report	Report link
Kick off	12:15 GMT
Attendance	58,622
Referee	Hugh Dallas (Scotland)
Celtic	Rangers
37' Sutton; 77' Hartson	47' Ricksen

Last updated: 9 January 2005
Source: Wikipedia article
^{1}Rangers goals come first.
National flags for Ground and Opponent columns are only shown when different from that of Rangers.
M = Match; Ground: H = Home, A = Away, N = Neutral, HR = Home replacement, AR = Away replacement.

=== UEFA Champions League ===
Game

Date

Tournament

Round

Ground

Opponent

Score^{1}

Report

2
10 August 2004
UEFA Champions League
QR3
A
(Russia) CSKA Moscow
1–2

Report	Report link
Kick off	17:00 BST
Attendance	11,000
Referee	Jan Wegereef
CSKA Moscow	Rangers
4' Love; 46' Jarošík	36' Novo

5
25 August 2004
UEFA Champions League
QR3
H
(Russia) CSKA Moscow
1–1

Report	Report link
Kick off	20:00 BST
Attendance	49,010
Referee	Wolfgang Stark
Rangers	CSKA Moscow
88' Thompson	61' Love

Last updated: 25 August 2004
Source: Wikipedia article
^{1}Rangers goals come first.
National flags for Ground and Opponent columns are only shown when different from that of Rangers.
M = Match; Ground: H = Home, A = Away, N = Neutral, HR = Home replacement, AR = Away replacement.

=== UEFA Cup ===
Game	Date	Tournament	Round	Ground	Opponent	Score^{1}	Report
8	16 September 2004	UEFA Cup	R1	A	(Portugal) Marítimo	0–1	Report / Report link; Kick off / 20:00 BST; Attendance / 5,000; Referee / Johan Verbist; Marítimo / Rangers; 27' Manduca
12	30 September 2004	UEFA Cup	R1	H	(Portugal) Marítimo	1–0 (4-2 pen.)	Report / Report link; Kick off / 20:00 BST; Attendance / 47,360; Referee / Vladimir Hrinak; Rangers / Marítimo; 71' Pršo
15	21 October 2004	UEFA Cup	GS	A	(Poland) Amica Wronki	5–0	Report / Report link; Kick off / 19:30 BST; Attendance / 3,100; Referee / Julian Rodriguez Santiago; Amica Wronki / Rangers; / 17' Løvenkrands; 57' Novo; 69' Ricksen; 73' (pen.) Arveladze; 89' Thompson
23	25 November 2004	UEFA Cup	GS	H	(Austria) Grazer AK	3–0	Report / Report link; Kick off / 19:45 GMT; Attendance / 46,453; Referee / Olegario Benquerenca; Rangers / Grazer AK; 58' Novo; 86' Arveladze; 90' Namouchi
25	2 December 2004	UEFA Cup	GS	A	(Netherlands) AZ Alkmaar	0–1	Report / Report link; Kick off / 19:45 GMT; Attendance / 8,343; Referee / Alon Yefet; AZ Alkmaar / Rangers; 8' Landzaat
28	15 December 2004	UEFA Cup	GS	H	(France) Auxerre	0–2	Report / Report link; Kick off / 19:45 GMT; Attendance / 48,847; Referee / Franz-Xaver Wack; Rangers / Auxerre; / 10' Kalou; 47' Kalou

Last updated: 15 December 2004
Source: Wikipedia article
^{1}Rangers goals come first.
National flags for Ground and Opponent columns are only shown when different from that of Rangers.
M = Match; Ground: H = Home, A = Away, N = Neutral, HR = Home replacement, AR = Away replacement.

== Competitions ==
=== Scottish Premier League ===
==== Standings ====
Pos	Team	Pld	W	D	L	GF	GA	GD	Pts	Qualification or relegation (Note: Teams played each other three times (33 matches), before the league split into two groups (the top six and the bottom six) for the last five matches.)
1	Rangers (C)	38	29	6	3	78	22	+56	93	Qualification for the Champions League third qualifying round
2	Celtic	38	30	2	6	85	35	+50	92	Qualification for the Champions League second qualifying round
3	Hibernian	38	18	7	13	64	57	+7	61	Qualification for the UEFA Cup first round
4	Aberdeen	38	18	7	13	44	39	+5	61	
5	Heart of Midlothian	38	13	11	14	43	41	+2	50	

Source: Scottish Professional Football League
Rules for classification: 1) Points; 2) Goal difference; 3) Goals scored
(C) Champions

=== UEFA Cup table ===
Pos	Team	Pld	W	D	L	GF	GA	GD	Pts	Qualification	AZ	AUX	GAK	RAN	AMC
1	(Netherlands) AZ	4	3	0	1	6	3	+3	9	Advance to knockout stage	—	2–0	—	1–0	—
2	(France) Auxerre	4	2	1	1	7	3	+4	7	Advance to knockout stage	—	—	0–0	—	5–1
3	(Austria) GAK	4	2	1	1	5	4	+1	7	Advance to knockout stage	2–0	—	—	—	3–1
4	(Scotland) Rangers	4	2	0	2	8	3	+5	6		—	0–2	3–0	—	—
5	(Poland) Amica Wronki	4	0	0	4	3	16	−13	0		1–3	—	—	0–5	—

Source: RSSSF
