= 2004–05 in Scottish football =

Football in Scotland
- Season: 2004–05

2004–05 in Scottish football

Premier League champions
- Rangers

First Division champions
- Falkirk

Second Division champions
- Brechin City

Third Division champions
- Gretna

Scottish Cup winners
- Celtic

League Cup winners
- Rangers

Challenge Cup winners
- Falkirk

Junior Cup winners
- Tayport

Teams in Europe
- Celtic, Dunfermline Athletic, Heart of Midlothian, Hibernian, Rangers

Scotland national team
- 2006 World Cup qualification

The 2004–05 season was the 108th season of competitive football in Scotland.

== Major transfer deals ==
=== 2004 ===
- 6 July 2004 – Nacho Novo from Dundee to Rangers, £450,000
- 1 July 2004 – Dado Prso from AS Monaco to Rangers, Bosman
- 12 July 2004 – Julián Speroni from Dundee to Crystal Palace, £500,000
- 29 July 2004 – David Murphy from Middlesbrough to Hibernian, Free
- 30 July 2004 – Henri Camara from Wolverhampton Wanderers to Celtic, Season loan
- 25 August 2004 – Juninho Paulista from Middlesbrough to Celtic, Free

=== 2005 ===
- 1 January 2005 – Jean-Alain Boumsong from Rangers to Newcastle United, £8m
- 5 January 2005 – Thomas Buffel from Feyenoord to Rangers, £2.5m
- 31 January 2005 – Craig Bellamy from Newcastle United to Celtic, Loan
- 31 January 2005 – Barry Ferguson from Blackburn Rovers to Rangers, £4.5m
- 28 January 2005 – Stéphane Henchoz from Liverpool to Celtic, Free

== League Competitions ==
=== Scottish Premier League ===
The 2004–05 Scottish Premier League season saw Rangers win the title after a last day win over Hibernian as Celtic were beaten by two late Motherwell goals from Scott McDonald, a win would have been enough for Celtic to retain their title regardless of Rangers' result. Dundee, also on the last day of the season, were relegated to the Scottish First Division after a draw with Livingston. Rangers and Celtic both qualified for the UEFA Champions League while Hibernian, in manager Tony Mowbray's first season in charge, went into the UEFA Cup. Inverness Caledonian Thistle, in their first season in the top flight, finished in 8th place.

Pos	Team	Pld	W	D	L	GF	GA	GD	Pts	Qualification or relegation (Note: Teams played each other three times (33 matches), before the league split into two groups (the top six and the bottom six) for the last five matches.)
1	Rangers (C)	38	29	6	3	78	22	+56	93	Qualification for the Champions League third qualifying round
2	Celtic	38	30	2	6	85	35	+50	92	Qualification for the Champions League second qualifying round
3	Hibernian	38	18	7	13	64	57	+7	61	Qualification for the UEFA Cup first round
4	Aberdeen	38	18	7	13	44	39	+5	61	
5	Heart of Midlothian	38	13	11	14	43	41	+2	50	
6	Motherwell	38	13	9	16	46	49	−3	48	
7	Kilmarnock	38	15	4	19	49	55	−6	49	
8	Inverness Caledonian Thistle	38	11	11	16	41	47	−6	44	
9	Dundee United	38	8	12	18	41	59	−18	36	Qualification for the UEFA Cup second qualifying round (Note: As Celtic, the 2004–05 Scottish Cup winners, qualified for the UEFA Champions League via their league position, the place in the UEFA Cup was passed onto Dundee United, the cup runners-up.)
10	Livingston	38	9	8	21	34	61	−27	35	
11	Dunfermline Athletic	38	8	10	20	34	60	−26	34	
12	Dundee (R)	38	8	9	21	37	71	−34	33	Relegation to the Scottish First Division

Source: Scottish Professional Football League
Rules for classification: 1) Points; 2) Goal difference; 3) Goals scored
(C) Champions; (R) Relegated

=== Scottish First Division ===
Pos	Team	Pld	W	D	L	GF	GA	GD	Pts	Promotion or relegation
1	Falkirk (C, P)	36	22	9	5	66	30	+36	75	Promotion to the Premier League
2	St Mirren	36	15	15	6	41	23	+18	60	
3	Clyde	36	16	12	8	35	29	+6	60	
4	Queen of the South	36	14	9	13	36	38	−2	51	
5	Airdrie United	36	14	8	14	44	48	−4	50	
6	Ross County	36	13	8	15	40	37	+3	47	
7	Hamilton Academical	36	12	11	13	35	36	−1	47	
8	St Johnstone	36	12	10	14	38	39	−1	46	
9	Partick Thistle (R)	36	10	9	17	38	52	−14	39	Relegation to the Second Division
10	Raith Rovers (R)	36	3	7	26	26	67	−41	16	Relegation to the Second Division

Source: "2004-2005 First Division - SPFL Archive". SPFL (in Malay).
Rules for classification: 1) points; 2) goal difference; 3) number of goals scored.
(C) Champions; (P) Promoted; (R) Relegated

=== Scottish Second Division ===
Pos	Team	Pld	W	D	L	GF	GA	GD	Pts	Promotion or relegation
1	Brechin City (C, P)	36	22	6	8	81	43	+38	72	Promotion to the First Division
2	Stranraer (P)	36	18	9	9	48	41	+7	63	Promotion to the First Division
3	Greenock Morton	36	18	8	10	60	37	+23	62	
4	Stirling Albion	36	14	9	13	56	55	+1	51	
5	Forfar Athletic	36	13	8	15	51	45	+6	47	
6	Alloa Athletic	36	12	10	14	66	68	−2	46	
7	Dumbarton	36	11	9	16	43	53	−10	42	
8	Ayr United	36	11	9	16	39	54	−15	42	
9	Arbroath (R)	36	10	8	18	49	73	−24	38	Relegation to the Third Division
10	Berwick Rangers (R)	36	8	10	18	40	64	−24	34	Relegation to the Third Division

Source: "2004-2005 Second Division - SPFL Archive". SPFL (in Malay).
Rules for classification: 1) points; 2) goal difference; 3) number of goals scored.
(C) Champions; (P) Promoted; (R) Relegated

=== Scottish Third Division ===
Pos	Team	Pld	W	D	L	GF	GA	GD	Pts	Promotion
1	Gretna (C, P)	36	32	2	2	130	29	+101	98	Promotion to the Second Division
2	Peterhead (P)	36	23	9	4	81	38	+43	78	Promotion to the Second Division
3	Cowdenbeath	36	14	9	13	54	61	−7	51	
4	Queen's Park	36	13	9	14	51	50	+1	48	
5	Montrose	36	13	7	16	47	53	−6	46	
6	Elgin City	36	12	7	17	39	61	−22	43	
7	Stenhousemuir	36	10	12	14	58	58	0	42	
8	East Fife	36	10	8	18	40	56	−16	38	
9	Albion Rovers	36	8	10	18	40	78	−38	34	
10	East Stirlingshire	36	5	7	24	32	88	−56	22	

Source: "2004-2005 Third Division - SPFL Archive". SPFL.
Rules for classification: 1) points; 2) goal difference; 3) number of goals scored.
(C) Champions; (P) Promoted

== Other honours ==
=== Cup honours ===
Competition	Winner	Score	Runner-up	Report
Scottish Cup 2004–05	Celtic	1–0	Dundee United	Wikipedia article
League Cup 2004–05	Rangers	5–1	Motherwell	Wikipedia article
Challenge Cup 2004–05	Falkirk	2–1	Ross County	Wikipedia article
Youth Cup	Celtic	2–0	St Mirren	
Junior Cup	Tayport	2–0	Lochee United	

=== Individual honours ===
==== SPFA awards ====
Award	Winner	Club
Players' Player of the Year (shared)	(Wales) John Hartson (Netherlands) Fernando Ricksen	Celtic; Rangers
Young Player of the Year	(Scotland) Derek Riordan	Hibernian

==== SFWA awards ====
Award	Winner	Club
Footballer of the Year	(Wales) John Hartson	Celtic
Young player of the Year	(Scotland) Derek Riordan	Hibernian
Manager of the Year	(England) Tony Mowbray	Hibernian

== Scottish clubs in Europe ==
=== Summary ===
Club	Competition(s)	Final round	Coef.
Celtic	UEFA Champions League	Group stage	7.00
Rangers	UEFA Champions League; UEFA Cup	Third qualifying round Group stage	6.50
Heart of Midlothian	UEFA Cup	Group stage	5.00
Dunfermline Athletic	UEFA Cup	Second qualifying round	0.50
Hibernian	UEFA Intertoto Cup	Second round	N/A

Average coefficient – 4.750

=== Celtic ===
Date	Venue	Opponents	Score	Celtic scorer(s)	Report
Champions League Group stage
14 September	Celtic Park, Glasgow (H)	(Spain) FC Barcelona	1–3	Chris Sutton	BBC Sport
29 September	San Siro, Milan (A)	(Italy) A.C. Milan	1–3	Stanislav Varga	BBC Sport
20 October	Shakhtar Stadium, Donetsk (A)	(Ukraine) Shakhtar Donetsk	0–3		BBC Sport
2 November	Celtic Park, Glasgow (H)	(Ukraine) Shakhtar Donetsk	1–0	Alan Thompson	BBC Sport
24 November 2004	Nou Camp, Barcelona (A)	(Spain) FC Barcelona	1–1	John Hartson	BBC Sport
7 December	Celtic Park, Glasgow (H)	(Italy) A.C. Milan	0–0		BBC Sport

=== Rangers ===
Date	Venue	Opponents	Score	Rangers scorer(s)	Report
Champions League third qualifying round
10 August	Dynamo Stadium, Moscow (A)	(Russia) CSKA Moscow	1–2	Nacho Novo	BBC Sport
25 August	Ibrox Stadium, Glasgow (H)	(Russia) CSKA Moscow	1–1	Steven Thompson	BBC Sport
UEFA Cup first round
16 September	Estádio dos Barreiros, Madeira (A)	(Portugal) Marítimo	0–1		BBC Sport
30 September	Ibrox Stadium, Glasgow (H)	(Portugal) Marítimo	1–0 (4 – 2 pen.)	Dado Pršo	BBC Sport
UEFA Cup Group stage
21 October	Stadio Amica, Wronki, Poland (A)	(Poland) Amica Wronki	5–0	Peter Løvenkrands, Nacho Novo, Fernando Ricksen, Shota Arveladze (pen.), Steven Thompson	BBC Sport
25 November	Ibrox Stadium, Glasgow (H)	(Austria) Grazer AK	3–0	Nacho Novo, Shota Arveladze, Hamed Namouchi	BBC Sport
2 December	Alkmaarder Hout, Alkmaar (A)	(Netherlands) AZ Alkmaar	0–1		BBC Sport
15 December	Ibrox Stadium, Glasgow (H)	(France) Auxerre	0–2		BBC Sport

=== Hearts ===
Date	Venue	Opponents	Score	Hearts scorer(s)	Report
UEFA Cup first round
16 September	Murrayfield Stadium, Edinburgh (H)	(Portugal) Sporting Braga	3–1	Andrew Webster, Paul Hartley, Patrick Kisnorbo	BBC Sport
30 September	Estádio Municipal de Braga, Braga (A)	(Portugal) Sporting Braga	2–2	Mark de Vries (2)	BBC Sport
UEFA Cup Group stage
21 October	Feijenoord Stadion, Rotterdam (A)	(Netherlands) Feyenoord	0–3		BBC Sport
4 November	Murrayfield Stadium, Edinburgh (H)	(Germany) Schalke 04	0–1		BBC Sport
25 November	St. Jakob-Park, Basel (A)	(Switzerland) FC Basel	2–1	Dennis Wyness, Robbie Neilson	BBC Sport
16 December	Murrayfield Stadium, Edinburgh (H)	(Hungary) Ferencvaros	0–1		BBC Sport

=== Dunfermline Athletic ===
Date	Venue	Opponents	Score	Dunfermline scorer(s)	Report
UEFA Cup Second qualifying round
12 August	Kaplakriki, Hafnarfjörður (A)	(Iceland) Hafnarfjarðar	2–2	Craig Brewster, Andrius Skerla	BBC Sport
26 August	McDiarmid Park, Perth (H)	(Iceland) Hafnarfjarðar	1–2	Gary Dempsey	BBC Sport

=== Hibernian ===
Date	Venue	Opponents	Score	Hibernian scorer(s)	Report
UEFA Intertoto Cup second round
3 July	Easter Road, Edinburgh (H)	(Lithuania) FK Vėtra	1–1	Garry O'Connor	BBC Sport
10 July	Vėtra Stadium, Vilnius (A)	(Lithuania) FK Vetra	0–1		BBC Sport

== Scotland national team ==
Date	Venue	Opponents	Score	Competition	Scotland scorer(s)	Report
18 August	Hampden Park, Glasgow (H)	Hungary	0–3	Friendly		BBC Sport
3 September	Estadio Ciudad de Valencia, Valencia (A)	Spain	1–1	Friendly	Rubén Baraja (o.g.) / James McFadden	BBC Sport
8 September	Hampden Park, Glasgow (H)	Slovenia	0–0	WCQ5		BBC Sport
9 October	Hampden Park, Glasgow (H)	Norway	0–1	WCQ5		BBC Sport
13 October	Republican Stadium, Chişinău (A)	Moldova	1–1	WCQ5	Steven Thompson	BBC Sport
17 November	Easter Road, Edinburgh (H)	Sweden	1–4	Friendly	James McFadden	BBC Sport
26 March	San Siro, Milan (A)	Italy	0–2	WCQ5		BBC Sport
4 June	Hampden Park, Glasgow (H)	Moldova	2–0	WCQ5	Christian Dailly, James McFadden	BBC Sport
8 June	Dinamo Stadium, Minsk (A)	Belarus	0–0	WCQ5		BBC Sport

Key:

- (H) = Home match
- (A) = Away match
- WCQ5 = World Cup Qualifying – Group 5

== Deaths ==
- 14 July: Alex Willoughby, 59, Rangers and Aberdeen forward.
- 7 August: Gordon Smith, 80, Hibs, Hearts, Dundee and Scotland winger.
- 30 August: Willie Duff, 69, Hearts and Dunfermline goalkeeper.
- 30 November: Bill Brown, 73, Dundee and Scotland goalkeeper.
- 26 January: Jackie Henderson, 73, Scotland forward.
