= Alan Hutton =

Scottish footballer (born 1984)

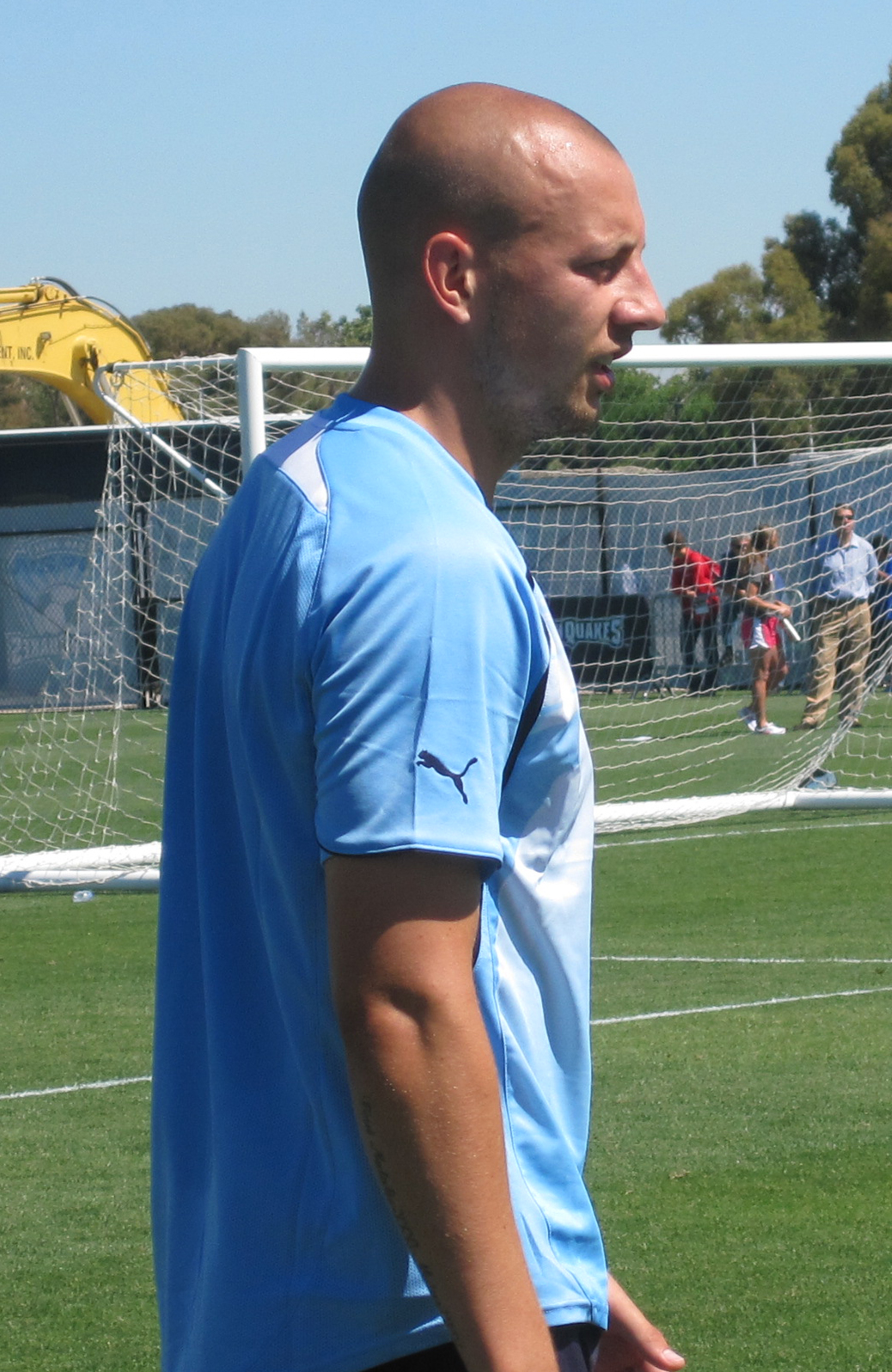
- Hutton in 2010

Personal information
- Full name: Alan Hutton
- Date of birth: 30 November 1984 (age 41)
- Place of birth: Glasgow, Scotland
- Height: 6 ft 1 in (1.85 m)
- Position: Right back

Youth career
- 2000–2003: Rangers

Senior career*
Years	Team	Apps	(Gls)
2002–2008	Rangers	94	(2)
2008–2011	Tottenham Hotspur	51	(2)
2010	→ Sunderland (loan)	11	(0)
2011–2019	Aston Villa	185	(3)
2012–2013	→ Nottingham Forest (loan)	7	(0)
2013	→ Mallorca (loan)	17	(0)
2014	→ Bolton Wanderers (loan)	9	(0)
Total		374	(7)

International career
2004–2006	Scotland U21	7	(0)
2007	Scotland B	1	(0)
2007–2016	Scotland	50	(0)
- * Club domestic league appearances and goals

Alan Hutton (born 30 November 1984) is a Scottish former professional footballer who played as a right back.

Hutton started his career with Rangers, and won the league title in 2005. He moved to English club Tottenham Hotspur in 2008, and helped them win the League Cup later that year. After a loan spell with Sunderland in 2010, Hutton joined Aston Villa in 2011. He initially struggled with Villa, and was loaned to Mallorca, Nottingham Forest and Bolton Wanderers. Hutton then enjoyed a renaissance with Villa, where his defensive exploits earned him the nickname "the Scottish Cafu". He left the club after helping them win promotion back to the Premier League in 2019, making over 200 appearances for the club.

Hutton made 50 appearances for Scotland between 2007 and 2016. He was also shortlisted for selection to the Great Britain team for the London 2012 Olympics, but did not make the final squad.

== Club career ==
=== Rangers ===
Hutton joined Rangers on 4 September 2000. He made his debut against Partick Thistle in a Scottish Premier League match on 22 December 2002. It was his only appearance that season; however, he made eleven appearances during 2003–04, scoring his first goal against Dunfermline Athletic at Ibrox on 23 March 2004.

He made twelve appearances during 2004–05 as the club won both the Scottish Premier League title and the Scottish League Cup. He broke his leg in February 2005 whilst playing in a league match against Kilmarnock, and was sidelined for eight months.

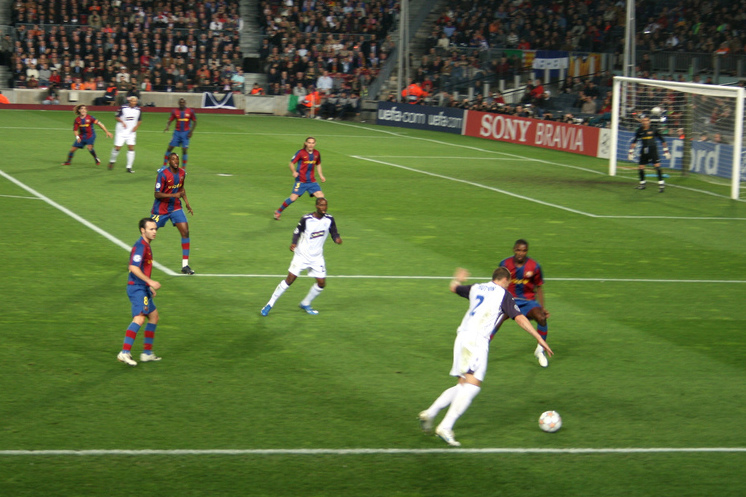
Hutton in possession at Camp Nou as Rangers visit Barcelona, 2007

The 2005–06 season proved to be difficult for Rangers domestically, and Hutton only made 23 appearances in the first team, competing with Dutchman Fernando Ricksen for the right back position. He signed a new five-year contract with Rangers in the summer of 2007.

Hutton started the 2007–08 season well, earning praise from Sir Alex Ferguson. He played a part in Rangers' opening UEFA Champions League group match victories against VfB Stuttgart and Olympique Lyonnais. Hutton made a total of 94 league appearances for Rangers, scoring two league goals against Dunfermline and Hibernian. He also scored goals against Partizan Belgrade in the UEFA Cup and East Stirlingshire in the Scottish Cup.

=== Tottenham Hotspur ===
During the January transfer window in the 2007–08 season, Premier League side Tottenham Hotspur made a bid, believed to be in the £5 million region, for Hutton. He initially rejected the chance to join Spurs, and did so again when they improved their offer. The protracted transfer was finally completed on 30 January 2008, with the fee reported to be in the region of £9 million. He made his Spurs debut on 2 February in a 1–1 draw with Manchester United. Hutton was cup-tied for the remainder of Spurs' UEFA Cup campaign. In just his third appearance for the club he played as Tottenham won the 2008 Football League Cup Final against Chelsea.

==== Loan to Sunderland ====
On 1 February 2010, Hutton signed for Sunderland on loan until the end of the season, and made his debut in the 1–1 draw with Wigan Athletic. On 24 April 2010, he was shown a red card for a clash with Jozy Altidore. Sunderland and Hutton were keen to make the move permanent, however they were unwilling to pay the fee that Spurs were demanding.

==== Return to Tottenham ====
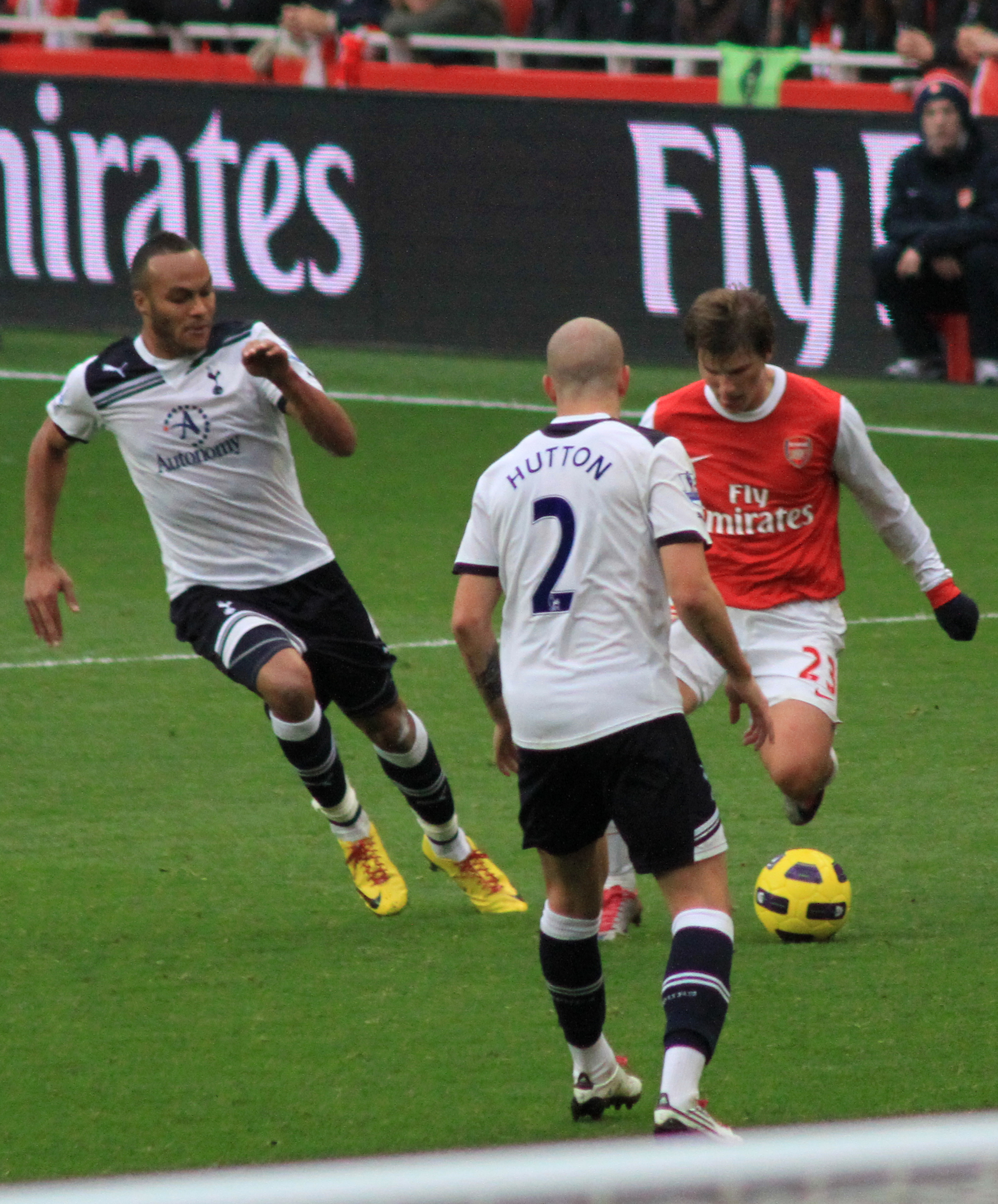
Hutton playing for Tottenham Hotspur at the Emirates stadium in the North London derby, 2010

After Sunderland failed to sign Hutton on a permanent deal, he returned to Spurs, scored in the opening game of the season, and won a penalty, allowing newly signed Rafael van der Vaart to convert and score Tottenham's first goal in the match, a 3–1 win against Wolverhampton Wanderers. He since started and played the full 90 minutes against Manchester United at Old Trafford in a 2–0 Premier League defeat. At the end of the 2010–11 season, he made 26 appearances for Spurs in all competitions. The next appearance, Hutton scored again, as Tottenham Hotspur lost to Bolton Wanderers. He was Tottenham's first choice right-back for the majority of the 2010–11 season, often being preferred to Croatian international Vedran Ćorluka on the right hand side of the Spurs defence. Hutton was also an important fixture in Tottenham's 2010–11 UEFA Champions League campaign that saw them reach the quarter-finals, including being part of the team that produced a memorable 3–1 victory over European champions Internazionale. However, his season ended in April, after suffering a knee injury, which ruled him out for the rest of the season.

However, at the beginning of the 2011–12 season, Tottenham Hotspur right-back Kyle Walker was regularly chosen ahead of Hutton in defence following his return from a loan spell away at Villa Park. Hutton was heavily linked with a £3 million transfer to Aston Villa, the club that Walker had recently returned from. After joining Aston Villa, Hutton made accusations towards Harry Redknapp of making his life a misery by training with the youth side and that he was treated as an 'outcast' during his three years spell at Tottenham Hotspur.

=== Aston Villa ===
On 31 August 2011, Aston Villa confirmed that they had signed Hutton on a four-year contract in a deal thought to be worth £40,000 a week to Hutton, along with fellow Tottenham player Jermaine Jenas, who arrived on loan. This move reunited Hutton with Alex McLeish, one of his former managers at Rangers. Upon joining Villa, Hutton said that the club was the 'only place he wanted to go'.

Hutton made his debut for Aston Villa on 10 September in a 2–2 draw away at Everton. Hutton also took part in Villa's 2–1 defeat to local rivals West Brom, where a tackle on Shane Long injured Long's knee keeping him out for six weeks. The tackle received no punishment during the game but later sparked a retrospective debate as to the fairness of the challenge. After the match his tackle was labelled 'vicious' by West Brom manager Roy Hodgson. Hutton was defended by Villa assistant manager Peter Grant, who insisted that Hutton is not a dirty player. McLeish also came out in support of Hutton, as well as expressing sympathy for Long. Later in the season Hutton's fiery reputation continued, as he was shown a second yellow card and sent off in Villa's 2–1 defeat at home to Arsenal on 21 December.

Hutton's first season at Villa Park was disappointing, and his future at the club remained in doubt during the close season. The speculation intensified when new Villa manager Paul Lambert signed Sheffield United right-back Matthew Lowton on 6 July 2012. Ten days later, Hutton was left out of the 25-man squad chosen to represent the club on the pre-season tour of the United States. Having been left out of the first team, Hutton admitted that he found himself in a difficult situation, but said that he hoped to force himself back into first-team contention.

==== Loan to Nottingham Forest ====
Having his first team opportunities limited at Aston Villa, Hutton joined Nottingham Forest on an emergency loan, until 2 January 2013, making him available for nine matches. Upon his loan move, Chairman Omar Al Hasawi described Hutton's move to Nottingham Forest, as a "big asset". Two days later, Hutton made his debut, making a quick impact by providing an assist for Billy Sharp to score the opener, as Nottingham Forest beat Wolves 2–1. Hutton established himself, playing right back in defence and played all the matches until his loan spell ended.

==== Loan to Mallorca ====
On 29 January 2013, Hutton was loaned out to Spanish side Mallorca until the end of the season. On 3 February 2013, Hutton made his debut, playing at right-back, in a 3–0 loss against Real Sociedad. The club were relegated, but despite this, Hutton expressed a desire to stay at the club next season. On 30 June 2013, Hutton's loan spell with Mallorca came to an end. The club then tried to sign Hutton, this time on a permanent basis. However, the move never materialised as the club could not afford a permanent deal.

==== Loan to Bolton ====
On 28 February 2014, he completed an emergency loan move to Football League Championship side Bolton Wanderers. He will spend an initial 28-day spell at the Reebok Stadium. He was on the bench for their next two games and made his Wanderers debut on 11 March 2014 in a goalless draw with Derby County at Pride Park. Bolton extended his loan deal at the club until the end of the 2013–14 season after he made a good impression in his first few games for the club.

==== Return to Aston Villa ====
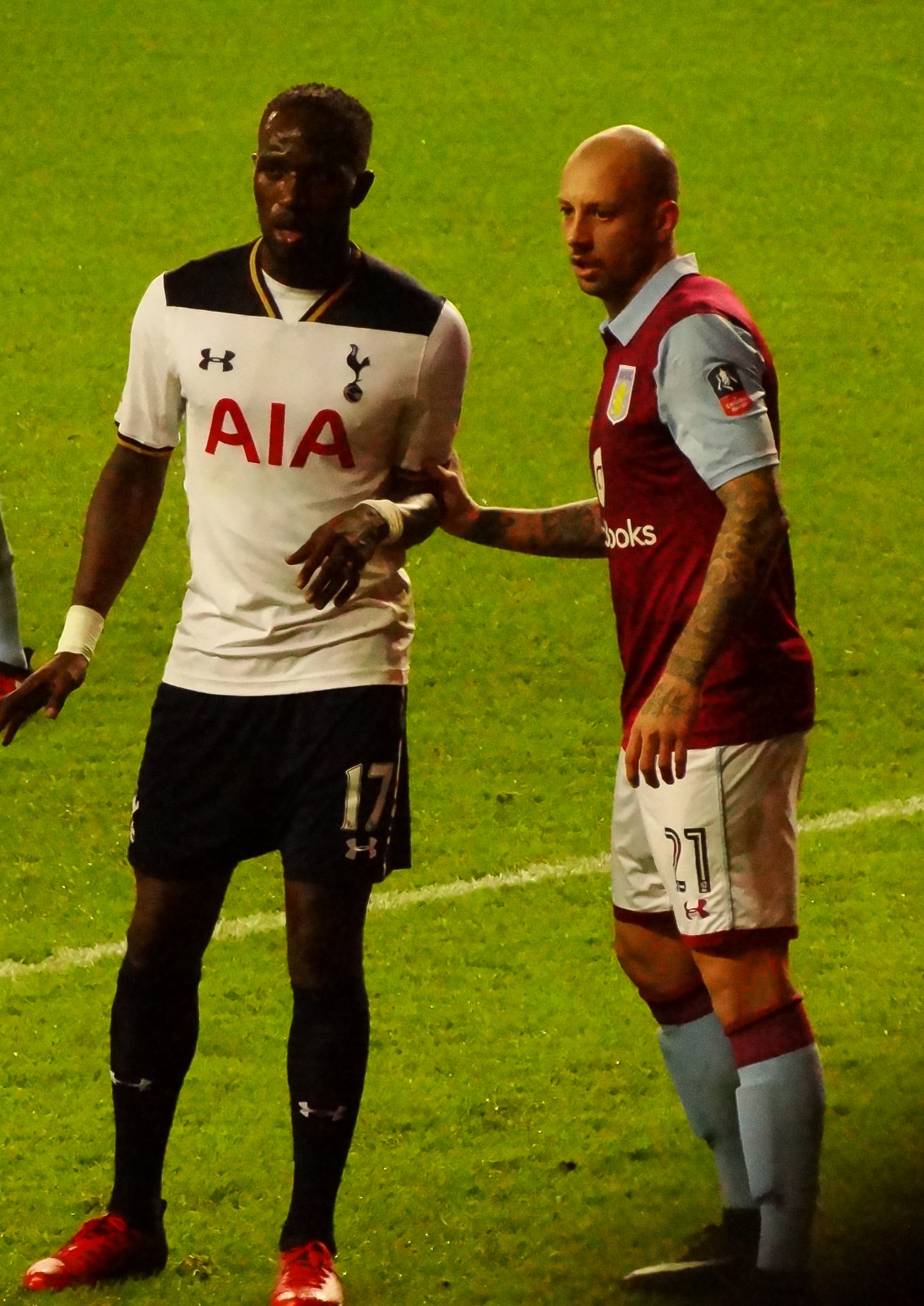
Hutton (right) holds Moussa Sissoko in an FA Cup tie with former club Spurs, 2017

Following his various loan spells, Hutton returned to Villa in 2014 and earned a surprise recall in a 3–1 pre-season friendly win over Mansfield Town on 18 July, putting in a good performance and assisting the equalising goal scored by Darren Bent, who had also returned following a massive absence from selection. Hutton's good pre-season form continued, and once the new Premier League season began he found himself as first choice right back again. On 16 September, after a strong start to the season both for Hutton personally and for Aston Villa, Hutton capped off a remarkable turnaround in his Villa career by signing a new 3-year contract at the club. He scored his first Villa goal against Leicester City on the half volley in December 2014.

He started and completed the 2015 FA Cup Final, a 4–0 defeat to Arsenal, and featured regularly (28 appearances) as Aston Villa finished bottom and were relegated from the Premier League the following season. On 14 June 2018, Hutton signed a new contract to remain at Villa Park until 2019. Hutton scored in a Second City derby win against Birmingham City on 25 November 2018, running from inside his own half before finishing with his left foot.

Hutton was released by Aston Villa at the end of the 2018–19 season. On 19 February 2020, he announced his retirement from professional football.

== International career ==
=== Scotland ===
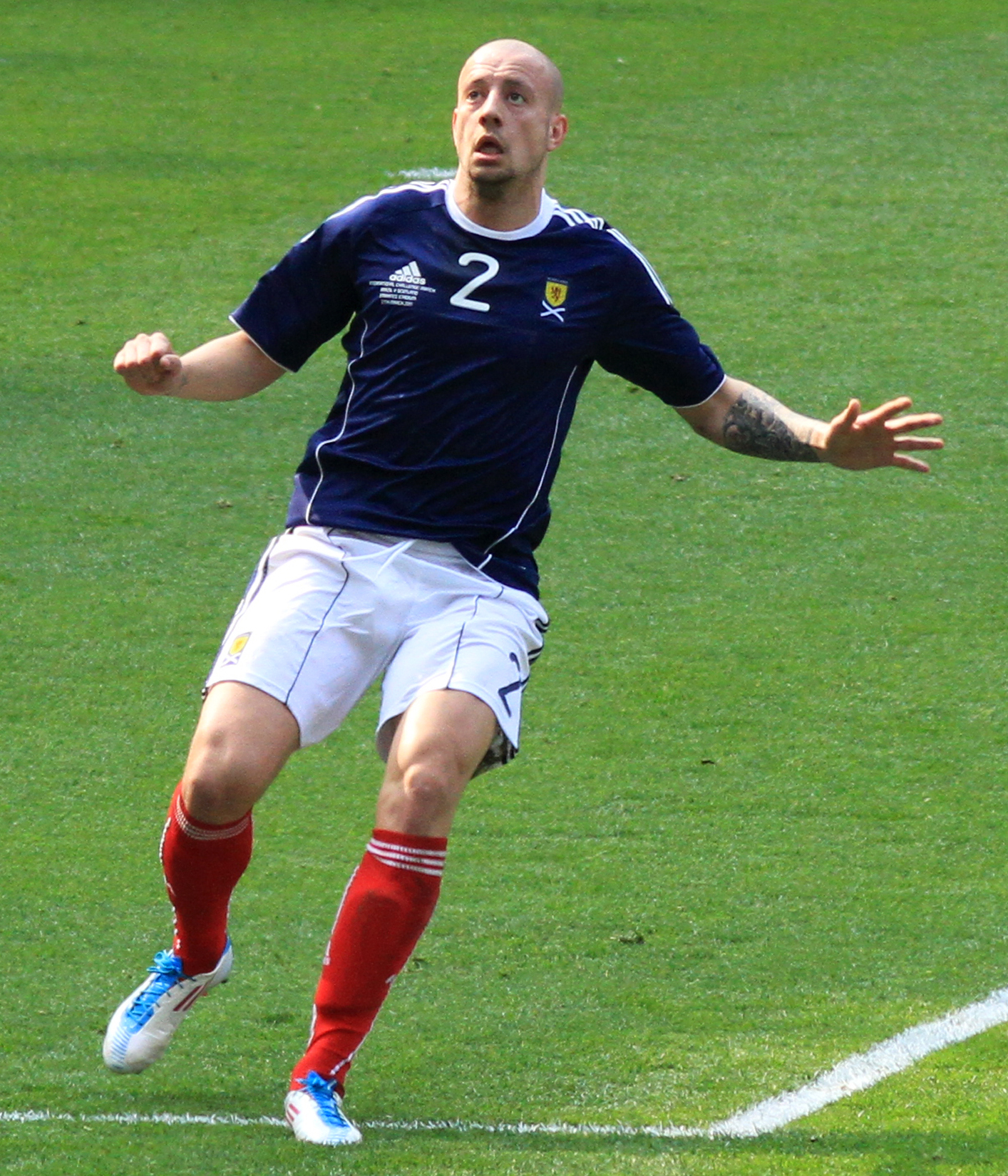
Hutton playing for Scotland in 2011

Hutton was capped by the Scotland men's national football team as well as at under 21 and B levels.

Along with his then-Rangers teammate Charlie Adam, Hutton was called up by manager Alex McLeish to the Scotland squad for the first time on 11 May 2007 for a friendly against Austria and a Euro 2008 qualifying match against the Faroe Islands. He made his international debut against Austria on 30 May 2007, coming on as a substitute. Hutton made his competitive debut against Lithuania in September 2007. Hutton was part of the Scotland team that beat France at Parc des Princes in September 2007.

Hutton won his 50th cap in March 2016, in a 1–0 win against Czech Republic. Scotland manager Gordon Strachan said in November 2016 that Hutton had retired from international football.

== Career statistics ==
=== Club ===
Appearances and goals by club, season and competition
Club	Season	League			National cup (Note: Includes Scottish Cup, FA Cup and Copa del Rey)		League cup (Note: Includes Scottish League Cup and Football League Cup)		Continental		Other		Total	
Club	Season	Division	Apps	Goals	Apps	Goals	Apps	Goals	Apps	Goals	Apps	Goals	Apps	Goals
Rangers	2002–03	Scottish Premier League	1	0	0	0	0	0	0	0	—		1	0
Rangers	2003–04	Scottish Premier League	11	1	0	0	0	0	0	0	—		11	1
Rangers	2004–05	Scottish Premier League	10	0	1	0	0	0	1 (Note: Appearance(s) in UEFA Cup/UEFA Europa League)	0	—		12	0
Rangers	2005–06	Scottish Premier League	19	0	0	0	1	0	3 (Note: Appearance(s) in UEFA Champions League)	0	—		23	0
Rangers	2006–07	Scottish Premier League	33	1	1	0	2	0	7	1	—		43	2
Rangers	2007–08	Scottish Premier League	20	0	1	1	1	0	9	0	—		31	1
Rangers	Total		94	2	3	1	4	0	20	1	—		121	4
Tottenham Hotspur	2007–08	Premier League	14	0	—		1	0	—		—		15	0
Tottenham Hotspur	2008–09	Premier League	8	0	0	0	1	0	2	0	—		11	0
Tottenham Hotspur	2009–10	Premier League	8	0	2	0	4	0	—		—		14	0
Tottenham Hotspur	2010–11	Premier League	21	2	1	0	0	0	4	0	—		26	2
Tottenham Hotspur	Total		51	2	3	0	6	0	6	0	—		66	2
Sunderland (loan)	2009–10	Premier League	11	0	—		—		—		—		11	0
Aston Villa	2011–12	Premier League	31	0	2	0	1	0	—		—		34	0
Aston Villa	2012–13	Premier League	0	0	0	0	0	0	—		—		0	0
Aston Villa	2013–14	Premier League	0	0	0	0	0	0	—		—		0	0
Aston Villa	2014–15	Premier League	30	1	4	0	1	0	—		—		35	1
Aston Villa	2015–16	Premier League	28	0	0	0	2	0	—		—		30	0
Aston Villa	2016–17	Championship	34	0	1	0	1	0	—		—		36	0
Aston Villa	2017–18	Championship	29	0	0	0	1	0	—		3 (Note: Appearance(s) in Championship play-offs)	0	33	0
Aston Villa	2018–19	Championship	33	2	1	0	0	0	—		0	0	34	2
Aston Villa	Total		185	3	8	0	6	0	—		3	0	202	3
Nottingham Forest (loan)	2012–13	Championship	7	0	—		—		—		—		7	0
Mallorca (loan)	2012–13	La Liga	17	0	—		—		—		—		17	0
Bolton Wanderers (loan)	2013–14	Championship	9	0	—		—		—		—		9	0
Career total			374	7	14	1	16	0	26	1	3	0	433	9

=== International ===
Appearances and goals by national team and year
National team	Year	Apps	Goals
Scotland	2007	6	0
Scotland	2008	2	0
Scotland	2009	6	0
Scotland	2010	4	0
Scotland	2011	5	0
Scotland	2012	5	0
Scotland	2013	10	0
Scotland	2014	5	0
Scotland	2015	6	0
Scotland	2016	1	0
Total		50	0

== Honours ==
Rangers

- Scottish Premier League: 2004–05

Tottenham Hotspur

- Football League Cup: 2007–08

Aston Villa

- FA Cup runner-up: 2014–15

Individual

- Scottish FA International Roll of Honour (50 caps): 2016
