= Thomas Buffel =

Belgian footballer

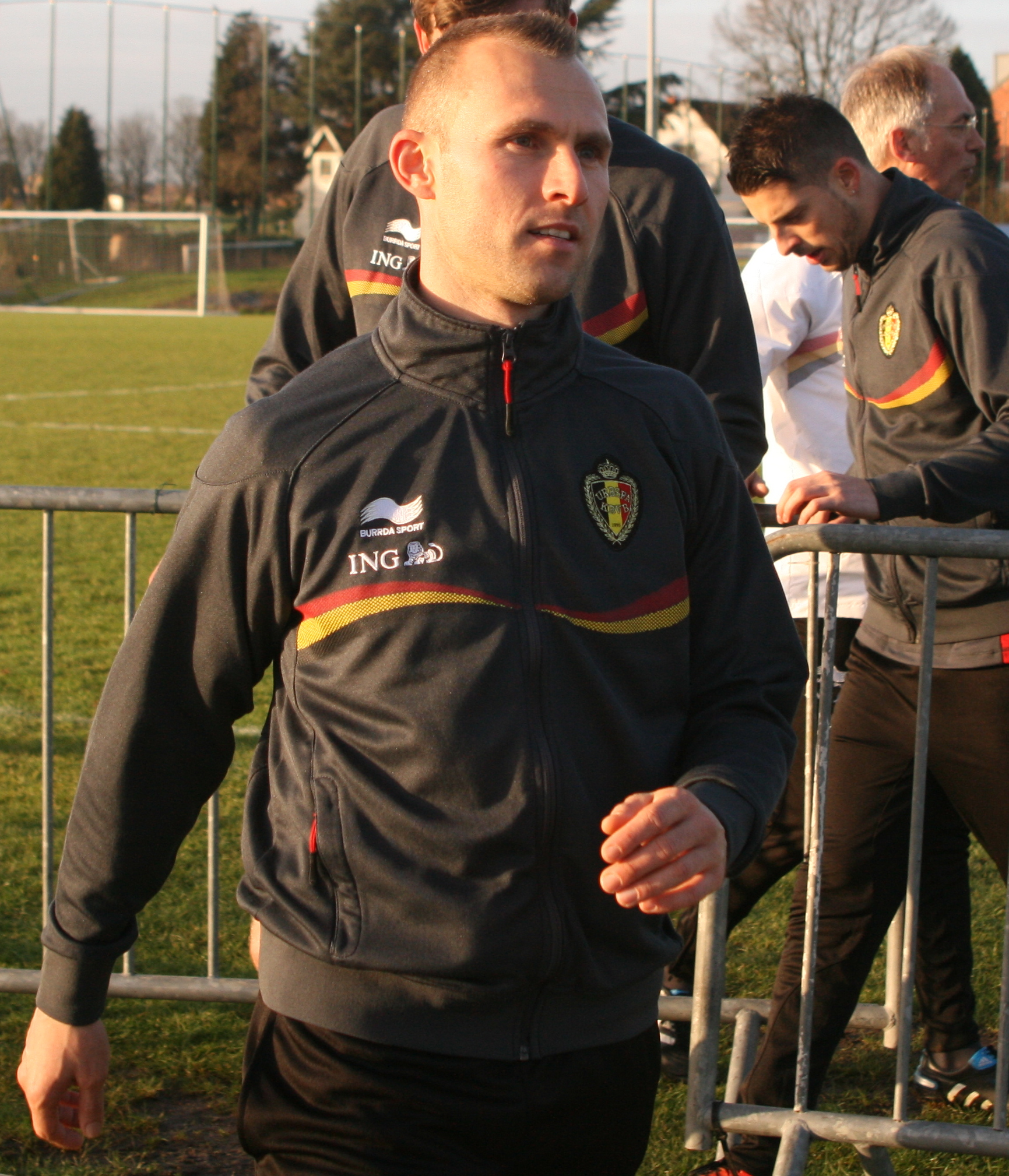
- Buffel in training with Belgium in 2006

Personal information
- Date of birth: 19 February 1981 (age 45)
- Place of birth: Bruges, Belgium
- Height: 1.75 m (5 ft 9 in)
- Position: Attacking midfielder

Team information
- Current team: Jong Genk (manager)

Youth career
- 1986–1990: Daring Ruddervoorde
- 1990–1997: Cercle Brugge
- 1997–1999: Feyenoord

Senior career*
Years	Team	Apps	(Gls)
1999–2005	Feyenoord	80	(35)
2000–2002	→ Excelsior (loan)	63	(27)
2005–2008	Rangers	51	(8)
2008–2009	Cercle Brugge	35	(5)
2009–2018	Genk	235	(34)
2018–2019	Zulte Waregem	18	(4)
Total		482	(113)

International career
1995	Belgium U15	2	(0)
1995–1998	Belgium U16	12	(1)
1995–1998	Belgium U17	22	(14)
1998–1999	Belgium U18	11	(1)
2000	Belgium U19	1	(0)
2002	Belgium U21	2	(0)
2002–2013	Belgium	36	(6)

Managerial career
- 2019–2020: Belgium U19 (assistant)
- 2020–2024: Belgium U21 (assistant)
- 2021: Cercle Brugge (assistant)
- 2024–2025: Jong Genk
- * Club domestic league appearances and goals

Thomas Buffel (Dutch pronunciation: [ˈtoːmɑz ˈbʏfəl]; (Note: In isolation, Thomas is pronounced [ˈtoːmɑs].) born 19 February 1981) is a Belgian professional football coach and a former player who played as an attacking midfielder or forward. He is the manager of Jong Genk in Challenger Pro League. He represented the Belgium national team at international level.

== Club career ==
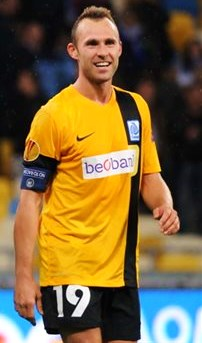
Thomas Buffel in Genk

=== Early career ===
Buffel began his career with Belgian sides Daring Ruddervoorde and Cercle Brugge before making a move to the Netherlands.

Buffel played for the Dutch team Feyenoord in the 1999–2000 season, before moving to their feeder team Excelsior Rotterdam from 2000 to 2002. He returned to Feyenoord for the 2002–03 Eredivisie season. He reportedly fell out with then-manager Ruud Gullit in the next season "after refusing to sign a new contract".

=== Rangers ===
Buffel moved to the Scottish side Rangers in January 2005 in a £2.3 million, four-and-a-half-year deal. He made his debut in the Scottish Cup coming on as a substitute against Old Firm rivals Celtic in what was to be a 2–1 defeat. However, the season did not end badly for him as he was to play a key role in the 2005 Scottish League Cup Final, where Rangers defeated Motherwell 5–1. He also featured in the Rangers team for the latter part of the season where he would help them to their 51st league title making it a double for his first season with the club. Buffel scored five goals in 18 appearances in all competitions.

Buffel featured in the Champions League and helped Rangers reach the last 16 of the tournament, where they lost to Villarreal 3–3 on aggregate and were knocked out on away goals rule. Across all competitions, he scored seven goals in 38 appearances during the 2005–2006 season mostly playing in the midfield.

In the 2007 January transfer window, German club Hannover 96 expressed an interest in him, with Rangers manager Walter Smith saying Buffel was free to leave. However, the deal fell through when Buffel was unable to agree personal terms with the Bundesliga side. It was announced on 9 February 2007 that Buffel would undergo surgery on a long-term knee injury and would not take any further part in the 2006–07 season. He returned to action on 26 September as a substitute in a Scottish League Cup tie against East Fife. He would go on to make just five appearances in all competitions in his final season at Rangers.

=== Cercle Brugge ===
Buffel's Rangers career came to an end when he joined former club Cercle Brugge on 1 July 2008.

=== Genk ===
In the 2009 summer transfer window Buffel made a last-minute transfer to KRC Genk as part of a deal between Genk and Cercle Brugge with Jelle Vossen (on loan) and Hans Cornelis moving the opposite way.

In the 2010–11 season he won the Belgian league title with Genk.

His contract was not renewed at the end of the 2017–18 season.

=== Zulte Waregem ===
In June 2018, it was announced Buffel would continue his career at Zulte Waregem.

Buffel retired at the end of the 2018–19 season.

== International career ==
Buffel made his debut for Belgium against Andorra in October 2002 in what was to be a 1–0 victory. He has since then gained 35 caps and scored 7 goals.

== Coaching career ==
Buffel began his coaching career in September 2019, when he was appointed assistant manager to Jacky Mathijssen at the Belgium national U-19 team. In March 2020, Buffel and Mathijssen was promoted to the U-21 national team.

On 3 February 2021, Buffel was also hired as an assistant manager for former club Cercle Brugge under newly appointed manager Yves Vanderhaeghe, next to his job at the national team. However, on 5 October 2021, Buffel decided to leave the position, as he was going to start his Pro License course and he therefore no longer could combine his two jobs.

On 18 June 2024, Buffel was hired as head coach of Jong Genk, the reserve team of Genk that plays in the second-tier Challenger Pro League.

== Personal life ==
Buffel was married to Stephanie De Buysser, with whom he had twin sons born in November 2013. They married in June 2016, when De Buysser was already suffering from colon cancer. On 26 January 2017, De Buysser died.

== Career statistics ==
=== Club ===
Appearances and goals by club, season and competition
Club	Season	League			Cup		Continental		Other		Total		Ref.
Club	Season	Division	Apps	Goals	Apps	Goals	Apps	Goals	Apps	Goals	Apps	Goals	Ref.
Excelsior (loan)	2000–01	Eerste Divisie	31	12			—		—		31	12	
Excelsior (loan)	2001–02	Eerste Divisie	32	15			—		—		32	15	
Excelsior (loan)	Total		63	27	0	0	0	0	0	0	63	27	–
Feyenoord	2002–03	Eredivisie	31	18			7	0	1 (Note: Two appearances in UEFA Super Cup)	0	39	18	
Feyenoord	2003–04	Eredivisie	34	15			4	2	—		38	17	
Feyenoord	2004–05	Eredivisie	15	2			6	0	—		21	2	
Feyenoord	Total		80	35	0	0	17	2	1	0	98	37	–
Rangers	2004–05	Scottish Premier League	10	1			0	0	5 (Note: Five appearances, three goals in Scottish Premiership playoffs)	3	15	4	
Rangers	2005–06	Scottish Premier League	24	4			7	1	5 (Note: Five appearances in Scottish Premiership playoffs)	0	36	5	
Rangers	2006–07	Scottish Premier League	16	3			5	1	0	0	21	4	
Rangers	2007–08	Scottish Premier League	1	0	1	0	2	0	0	0	4	0	
Rangers	Total		51	8	1	0	14	2	10	3	76	13	–
Cercle Brugge	2008–09	Belgian First Division	30	3			—		—		30	3	
Cercle Brugge	2009–10	Belgian Pro League	5	2			–		—		2	5	
Cercle Brugge	Total		35	5	0	0	0	0	0	0	35	5	–
Genk	2009–10	Belgian Pro League	25	4	2	0	—		9 (Note: Nine appearances, three goals in Belgian Pro League playoffs)	3	36	7	
Genk	2010–11	Belgian Pro League	26	1	2	0	2	0	7 (Note: Seven appearances in Belgian Pro League playoffs)	0	37	1	
Genk	2011–12	Belgian Pro League	26	8	1	0	9	1	8 (Note: Seven appearances in Belgian Pro League playoffs, one appearance in Belgian Super Cup)	0	44	9	
Genk	2012–13	Belgian Pro League	29	4	5	1	11	2	10 (Note: Ten appearances in Belgian Pro League playoffs)	0	55	7	
Genk	2013–14	Belgian Pro League	26	3	1	0	9	1	10 (Note: Nine appearances, three goals in Belgian Pro League playoffs, one appearance in Belgian Super Cup)	3	46	7	
Genk	2014–15	Belgian Pro League	28	3	1	0	0	0	6 (Note: Six appearances, three goals in Belgian Pro League playoffs)	3	35	6	
Genk	2015–16	Belgian Pro League	28	6	4	1	0	0	12 (Note: Twelve appearances, three goals in Belgian Pro League playoffs)	3	44	10	
Genk	2016–17	Belgian First Division A	21	2	2	0	17	4	10 (Note: Ten appearances, two goals in Belgian First Division playoffs)	2	50	8	
Genk	2017–18	Belgian First Division A	26	3	6	1	0	0	9 (Note: Nine appearances in Belgian First Division playoffs)	0	41	4	
Genk	Total		235	34	24	3	48	8	81	14	388	59	–
Cercle Brugge	2018–19	Belgian First Division A	18	4	2	0	—		1	0	21	4	
Career total			482	113	27	3	79	12	93	17	681	145	–

=== International ===
Scores and results list Belgium's goal tally first, score column indicates score after each Buffel goal.

List of international goals scored by Thomas Buffel
No.	Date	Venue	Opponent	Score	Result	Competition
1	30 April 2003	King Baudouin Stadium, Brussels, Belgium	Poland	2–0	3–1	Friendly
2	11 October 2003	Stade Maurice Dufrasne, Liège, Belgium	Estonia	2–0	2–0	Euro 2004 Qualification
3	18 August 2004	Ullevaal, Oslo, Norway	Norway	1–0	2–2	Friendly
4	18 August 2004	Ullevaal, Oslo, Norway	Norway	2–1	2–2	Friendly
5	26 March 2005	King Baudouin Stadium, Brussels, Belgium	Bosnia and Herzegovina	4–1	4–1	2006 World Cup Qualification
6	7 September 2005	Olympisch Stadion, Antwerp, Belgium	San Marino	3–0	8–0	2006 World Cup Qualification

== Honours ==
Rangers

- Scottish Premier League: 2004–05
- Scottish League Cup: 2004–05

Genk

- Belgian Pro League: 2010–11
- Belgian Cup: 2012–13
- Belgian Super Cup: 2011

Individual

- Eerste Divisie Golden Bull award (nl): 2000–01, 2001–02
- Pro League Hall of Fame: 2024
