= 2004–05 Scottish League Cup =

2004–05 Co-operative Insurance Cup
Tournament details
- Country: Scotland

Final positions
- Champions: Rangers
- Runners-up: Motherwell

The 2004–05 Scottish League Cup was the 59th staging of the Scotland's second most prestigious football knockout competition, also known for sponsorship reasons as the CIS Insurance Cup.

The competition was won by Rangers, who defeated Motherwell 5–1 in the final.

== First round ==
Home team	Score	Away team
Airdrie United	3–0	East Fife
Berwick Rangers	3–2	Elgin City
Brechin City	5–2	Cowdenbeath
Dumbarton	1–3	Ross County
Falkirk	4–1	Montrose
Peterhead	3–2	East Stirlingshire
St Johnstone	2–3	Alloa Athletic
St Mirren	2–5	Forfar Athletic
Stenhousemuir	2–1	Arbroath
Stranraer	2–1	Raith Rovers
Stirling Albion	3–2	Queen's Park
Hamilton Academical	4–1	Ayr United
Greenock Morton	1–0	Gretna
Queen of the South	1–2	Albion Rovers

== Second round ==
Home team	Score	Away team
Aberdeen	3–0	Berwick Rangers
Airdrie United	0–1	Clyde
Albion Rovers	1–1 (4–3 pen.)	Brechin City
Dundee	4–0	Forfar Athletic
Hibernian	4–0	Alloa Athletic
Kilmarnock	3–0	Hamilton Academical
Greenock Morton	0–3	Motherwell
Peterhead	1–6	Falkirk
Ross County	0–1	Inverness CT
Stenhousemuir	2–5	Partick Thistle
Dundee United	3–1	Stranraer
Stirling Albion	0–2	Livingston

== Third round ==
Home team	Score	Away team
Celtic	8–1	Falkirk
Dundee United	4–0	Clyde
Livingston	2–1	Dundee
Aberdeen	0–2	Rangers
Albion Rovers	1–3	Hibernian
Dunfermline Athletic	3–1	Partick Thistle
Hearts	2–1	Kilmarnock
Inverness CT	1–3	Motherwell

== Quarter-finals ==
Home team	Score	Away team
Dundee United	2–1	Hibernian
Dunfermline Athletic	1–3	Hearts
Livingston	0–5	Motherwell
Rangers	2–1	Celtic

== Semi-finals ==
1 February 2005

Heart of Midlothian	2–3 (a.e.t.)	Motherwell
Burchill 85'; Thorarinsson 90'	Report	Craigan 20'; Foran 78' (pen.); Fitzpatrick 120'

Easter Road, Edinburgh
Attendance: 14,069
Referee: Dougie McDonald

2 February 2005

Rangers	7–1	Dundee United
Novo 7', 85'; Pršo 18'; Buffel 67'; Ricksen 77'; Thompson 80', 88'	Report	Scotland 50'

Hampden Park, Glasgow
Attendance: 25,622
Referee: Hugh Dallas

== Final ==
20 March 2005

Rangers	5–1	Motherwell
Ross 5'; Kyrgiakos 9', 86'; Ricksen 33'; Novo 48'	Report	Partridge 13'

Hampden Park, Glasgow
Attendance: 50,182
Referee: Mike McCurry
