= Hamed Namouchi =

Tunisian footballer (born 1984)

Personal information
- Full name: Hamed Namouchi
- Date of birth: 14 February 1984 (age 42)
- Place of birth: Cannes, France
- Height: 1.83 m (6 ft 0 in)
- Position: Midfielder

Senior career*
Years	Team	Apps	(Gls)
2000–2003	Cannes	31	(14)
2003–2006	Rangers	51	(5)
2006–2009	Lorient	52	(3)
2010	SC Freiburg	8	(2)
2010–2011	Grenoble	14	(7)
2012–2014	Étoile du Sahel	19	(8)
2014	Lokomotiv Plovdiv	10	(1)
Total		185	(46)

International career
2005–2008	Tunisia	20	(1)
- * Club domestic league appearances and goals

Hamed Namouchi (Arabic: حامد النموشي; born 14 February 1984) is a former professional footballer who played as a midfielder. Born in France, he played for the Tunisia national team internationally.

== Club career ==
Born in Cannes, France, Namouchi started his career with local club AS Cannes.

He signed for Rangers in September 2003 on a free transfer. He made his Rangers debut on 10 January 2004 against Hibernian as a substitute. On 1 January 2005, he scored a late equaliser to salvage a 1–1 draw away to Dundee United. At Rangers he picked up a Scottish Premier League winners' medal in 2005, and appeared in every game in their UEFA Champions League campaign where he was earmarked by Luís Figo as the player that "impressed him most".

Namouchi joined Lorient for a fee of £500,000 in August 2006 after being told by Rangers manager Paul Le Guen that he was surplus to requirements.

In late 2009, Namouchi agreed to a contract with the Turkish Süper Lig side Sivasspor after lengthy contract negotiations.

On 15 November 2009, he was invited to a trial at SC Freiburg. The following month, he signed with SC Freiburg for the remainder of the season.

In October 2010, he signed with French second-tier side Grenoble on a two-year deal.

In January 2012, he moved to Tunisia, signing a three-and-a-half-year contract with Étoile Sportive du Sahel.

In June 2014 he moved to Lokomotiv Plovdiv of the Bulgarian Premier League.

== International career ==
Born in France, Namouchi played for the Tunisia national team. He won his 14th international cap against Belarus in May 2006, scoring his first international goal in the same game. He was also a member of Tunisia's qualification for the 2006 FIFA World Cup and featured in all of their three games at the tournament.

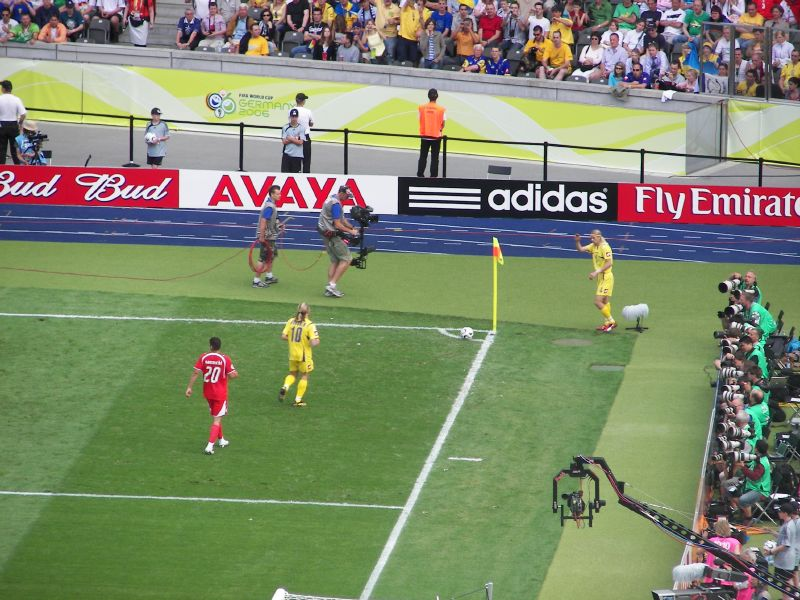
Hamed Namouchi at the 2006 fifa world cup
