= Fernando Ricksen =

Dutch footballer (1976–2019)

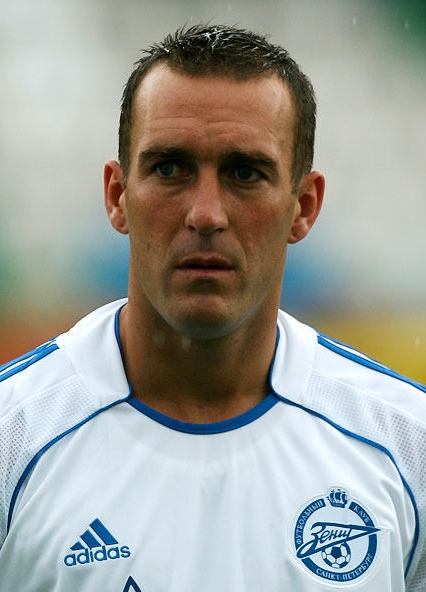
- Ricksen playing for Zenit Saint Petersburg in 2007

Personal information
- Full name: Fernando Jacob Hubertina Henrika Ricksen
- Date of birth: 27 July 1976
- Place of birth: Hoensbroek, Netherlands
- Date of death: 18 September 2019 (aged 43)
- Place of death: Airdrie, North Lanarkshire, Scotland
- Height: 1.75 m (5 ft 9 in)
- Positions: Central midfielder; right-back

Youth career
- 1980–1986: EHC
- 1986–1988: RKONS
- 1988–1992: Roda JC
- 1992–1994: Fortuna Sittard

Senior career*
Years	Team	Apps	(Gls)
1994–1997	Fortuna Sittard	94	(5)
1997–2000	AZ	92	(12)
2000–2006	Rangers	182	(13)
2006	→ Zenit Saint Petersburg (loan)	14	(2)
2007–2009	Zenit Saint Petersburg	22	(0)
2010–2013	Fortuna Sittard	48	(1)
Total		452	(33)

International career
2000–2003	Netherlands	12	(0)
- * Club domestic league appearances and goals

Fernando Jacob Hubertina Henrika Ricksen (27 July 1976 – 18 September 2019) was a Dutch professional footballer who played as a right back and central midfielder. After winning Eerste Divisie titles with Fortuna Sittard and AZ, he joined Rangers for £3.75 million in 2000. In six years with the club from Glasgow, he won two Scottish Premier League titles, two Scottish Cups and three Scottish League Cups. He left in 2006 for Zenit Saint Petersburg, initially on loan, and won honours including the UEFA Cup and UEFA Super Cup in 2008. He was dismissed by Zenit in 2009, and spent the final years of his career back at Fortuna Sittard. Internationally, he earned 12 caps for the Netherlands between 2000 and 2003.

Ricksen was elected to Rangers's Hall of Fame in 2014. He suffered from motor neurone disease and died from the disease on 18 September 2019, aged 43.

== Club career ==
=== Rangers ===
Ricksen, formerly of Fortuna Sittard, joined Rangers in 2000 from Dutch team AZ Alkmaar for a transfer fee of £3.75 million.

Ricksen endured a difficult start to his Rangers career, culminating in him being substituted after a torrid 21 minutes in a 6–2 defeat to Celtic. On his second trip to Celtic Park six months later, he was sent off before half-time in another defeat. He had been dropped for the two intervening derbies.

In November 2000 Ricksen became the first player in Scottish football to be banned retrospectively on television evidence. His Kung Fu-style kick on Darren Young had been missed by the referee but caught on camera, leading to a five-game ban. Ricksen subsequently used his personal website to suggest Young required "straightening out."

2003–04 proved to be a failed season for Rangers, with the departure of several players from the treble-winning season, including Barry Ferguson and Lorenzo Amoruso. Ricksen, however, proved to be an important member of the Rangers team which finished second, playing 42 games, despite several injuries and disciplinary problems throughout the season. In October 2003 Ricksen pushed then Rangers chairman John McClelland into a swimming pool before a match against Panathinaikos in Athens. The same week he was banned from the Netherlands national team for smashing a hotel door down after a night out. After the events Rangers banned Ricksen from talking to the media and manager McLeish said "We would rather have Fernando on the back pages and we have told him that."

In March 2004 Ricksen was again banned by the SFA video review panel. He had elbowed Derek Riordan in a CIS Cup defeat to Hibernian, resulting in a four-game ban and a £10,000 fine from his club.

The highlight of Ricksen's career at Rangers came in the 2004–05 season seeing him jointly win the SPFA player of the year award after scoring nine goals from midfield in his 40 appearances for the club, helping Rangers to a league and league cup double.

It remained unclear whether Ricksen would be seen as a key member of the Rangers team under new manager Paul Le Guen for the 2006–07 season. An alcohol-fueled incident involving a passenger on Rangers' outbound flight to their pre-season camp in South Africa, led to Ricksen being sent home by Le Guen, who later described his behaviour as "inappropriate and unacceptable for the way in which I have asked my players to conduct themselves."

On 30 March 2014, Ricksen was inducted into the Rangers Hall of Fame along with Lee McCulloch and Nacho Novo.

=== Zenit Saint Petersburg ===
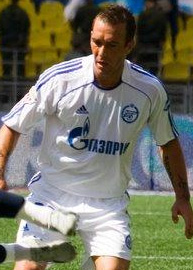
Ricksen playing for Zenit Saint Petersburg in 2007

Ricksen moved on loan to Zenit Saint Petersburg on a season long loan on 9 August 2006, the Russian club's manager being Dick Advocaat, who signed Ricksen for Rangers. Two weeks later he returned to Ibrox in a friendly between Rangers and Zenit and was booed after injuring Chris Burke with what was described as a reckless tackle. Weeks later, Ricksen engaged in an on-field fist-fight with Zenit captain Vladislav Radimov. On 28 November 2006, Zenit Saint Petersburg announced that they bought out Ricksen's transfer from Rangers. Despite this, Ricksen again fought with Radimov during a match in January 2007. Ricksen was an unused substitute in the 2008 UEFA Cup Final, in which Zenit triumphed over Rangers. In January 2009, after two and a half years in Russia, Ricksen was demoted to Zenit's reserve side, having previously refused to leave the club. On 28 August 2009, FC Zenit terminated his contract because of Ricksen's constant disciplinary misbehaviours.

=== Return to Sittard ===
After being without a club for more than a year, on 2 December 2010 Ricksen agreed to rejoin his childhood team Fortuna Sittard, involved in their battle to escape relegation from the Eerste Divisie, signing a contract till the end of the season.

== International career ==
Ricksen earned the first of 12 caps for the Netherlands on 15 November 2000, playing two minutes as a substitute for Paul Bosvelt in a 3–2 friendly win over Spain at the Estadio Olimpico de la Cartuja in Seville. His final cap was on 30 April 2003, a 1–1 home draw with Portugal in another friendly.

In June 2003, after a UEFA Euro 2004 qualifier away to Belarus, Ricksen got drunk and kicked down two hotel room doors. He was subsequently ostracised by manager Dick Advocaat and did not play for the Netherlands again.

== Personal life ==
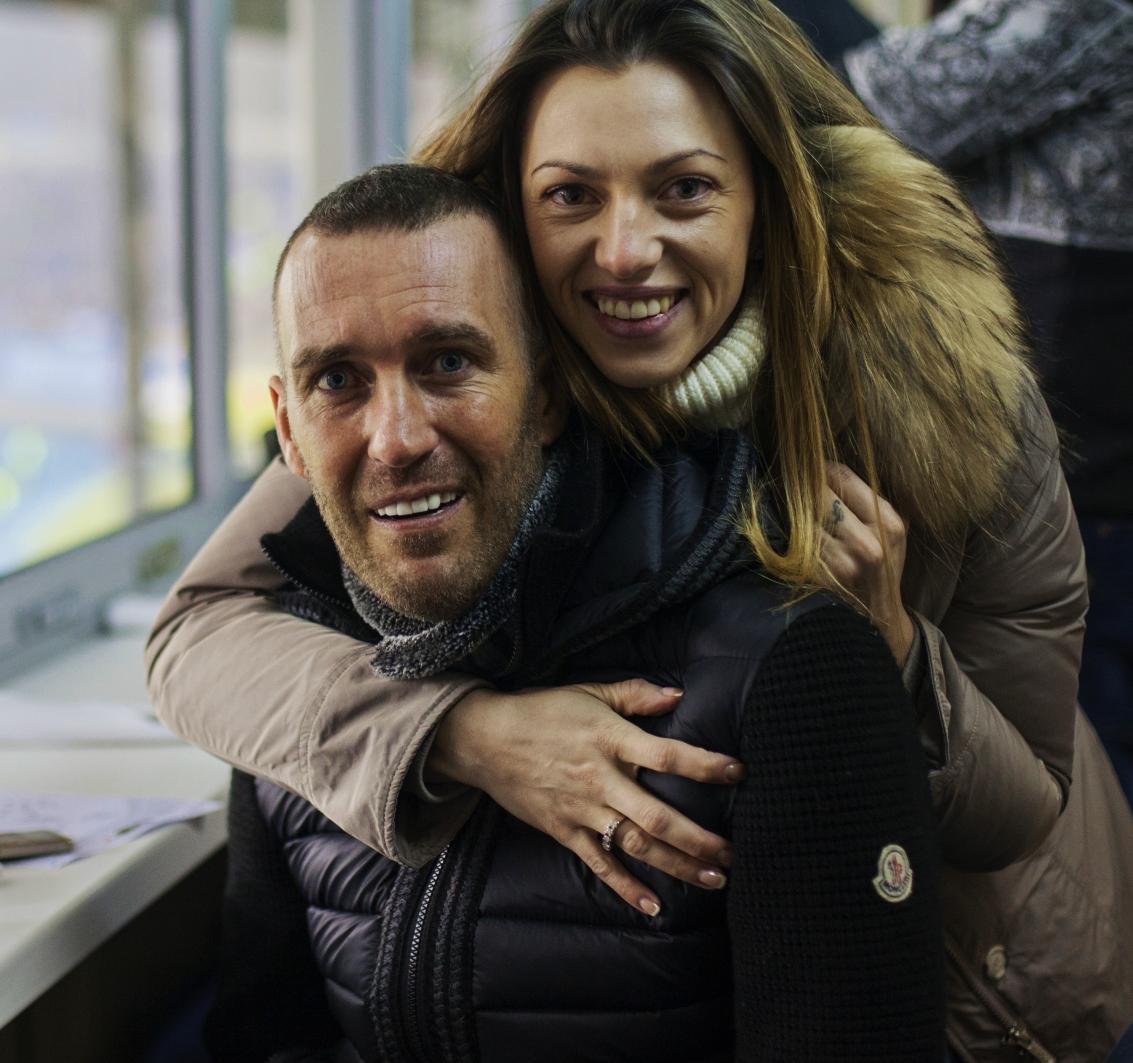
Ricksen (left) attending a Zenit Saint Petersburg match in 2015

On 25 December 2000, Ricksen was the subject of a report to the procurator fiscal after an incident when his car crashed into a lamppost in the early hours of the morning. Ricksen denied charges of drink-driving, careless driving, committing a breach of the peace by shouting and swearing, and conducting himself in a disorderly manner. At a trial in February 2003 Ricksen was found to have been twice over the limit and was convicted of drunk-driving, receiving a £500 fine and a 12-month driving ban. He was acquitted of the other charges.

In October 2003, Ricksen was fined £7,000 after being convicted of a breach of the peace and assault in relation to a drunken late-night house party he held the previous November. Having initially denied the charges, in court Ricksen admitted conducting himself in a disorderly manner, causing a breach of the peace, repeatedly igniting fireworks, shouting and swearing and then threatening and assaulting a neighbour who had complained. During the 2004–05 football season, Ricksen abstained from alcohol. In July 2006 Ricksen checked himself into the Sporting Chance Clinic for residential treatment relating to alcohol abuse and anger management. For the previous six months he had been receiving out-patient treatment from the clinic.

Ricksen's daughter Isabella was born in 2011. In 2014 Ricksen married Veronika, who is Russian. A documentary titled Fernando Ricksen: Hard Times was aired on Sky Sports 1 on 3 May 2015. Ricksen was Catholic but later revealed his wish to convert to Orthodoxy.

Ricksen wrote an autobiography, Fighting Spirit, which was published in 2014.

== Illness and death ==
On 30 October 2013, Ricksen revealed that he was terminally ill and had been diagnosed with amyotrophic lateral sclerosis (motor neurone disease). He set up a charity that raised over £1 million for research into the condition.

His former club, Rangers, held a tribute match on January 25, 2015, featuring several of Ricksen's former teammates, along with other prominent former players. 41,000 supporters attended the game, which Ricksen attended, and took part in the kick-off before departing the field.

Ricksen died on 18 September 2019 in St Andrew's Hospice in Airdrie, North Lanarkshire, Scotland, aged 43. His funeral was held at Wellington Church in Glasgow on 25 September, attended by dignitaries of Celtic and Rangers, after which he was cremated at Linn crematorium, in a private ceremony.

== Honours ==
Fortuna Sittard

- Eerste Divisie: 1994–95

AZ

- Eerste Divisie: 1997–98

Rangers

- Scottish Premier League: 2002–03, 2004–05
- Scottish Cup: 2001–02, 2002–03
- Scottish League Cup: 2001–02, 2002–03, 2004–05

Zenit Saint Petersburg

- Russian Premier League: 2007
- Russian Super Cup: 2008
- UEFA Cup: 2007–08
- UEFA Super Cup: 2008

Individual

- PFA Scotland Players' Player of the Year: 2004–05
- Rangers F.C. Hall of Fame: inducted in 2014
