= John McClelland (businessman) =

John Ferguson McClelland, CBE, FRSE, FRSA (born 1945, in Glasgow) is a Scottish businessman and a former chairman of Rangers F.C.

== Business career ==
McClelland spent 35 years in the international electronics industry holding senior board-level positions at a number of the sector's leading corporations and gaining wide experience of business operations in all geographies. At IBM he was vice president of worldwide operations for its personal computer company before joining Digital Equipment Corporation in 1995, where he was the senior vice president responsible for all of Digital's worldwide operational activities.

Following an appointment to the board of Philips Consumer Electronics as Global Chief Industrial Officer he joined 3Com Corporation where he was a corporate officer and latterly president of its Business Networks Company. He was chairman of the Scottish Further and Higher Education Funding Council and former chairman of the CBI's Technology and Innovation Committee.

During his career he developed extensive experience and a passionate interest in procurement and supply chain operations and gained recognition as a leading practitioner in this field. In 2006, he conducted a review of public sector procurement in Scotland on behalf of the Scottish Government. This review formed the basis of an ongoing major reform of public procurement in Scotland.

He has also assisted the Welsh Assembly Government in pursuing improvements in public procurement structures and practices as Chairman of NQC Limited and is involved in a number of procurement strategy and related projects across the UK.

== Director of Rangers FC ==
McClelland was appointed a director at Rangers Football Club in October 2000 and was appointed as vice-chairman in November 2001. He was executive chairman of the club between 2002 and 2004 therefore was both Chief Executive and chairman. He succeeded and was replaced by David Murray on both occasions. In 2002, Murray had relinquished the chairmanship and limited his day-to-day involvement in the club's running with McClelland taking over, only for him to return in August 2004 to head up a new share issue. In July 2008, McClelland assumed the role of vice-chairperson of the European Club Association, along with Joan Laporta of Barcelona and Umberto Gandini of AC Milan.

On 17 October 2011, McClelland and John Greig resigned from their posts as non-executive directors at Ibrox. The duo said they had been isolated following the takeover of Rangers by Craig Whyte in May that year.

== Personal life ==
In 1994, he was appointed a CBE for services to industry and education. He became a fellow of Royal Society of Edinburgh in 1995 and was vice-president between 2009 and 2012. He is a companion of the Institute of Management.
