= Nacho Novo =

Spanish footballer (born 1979)

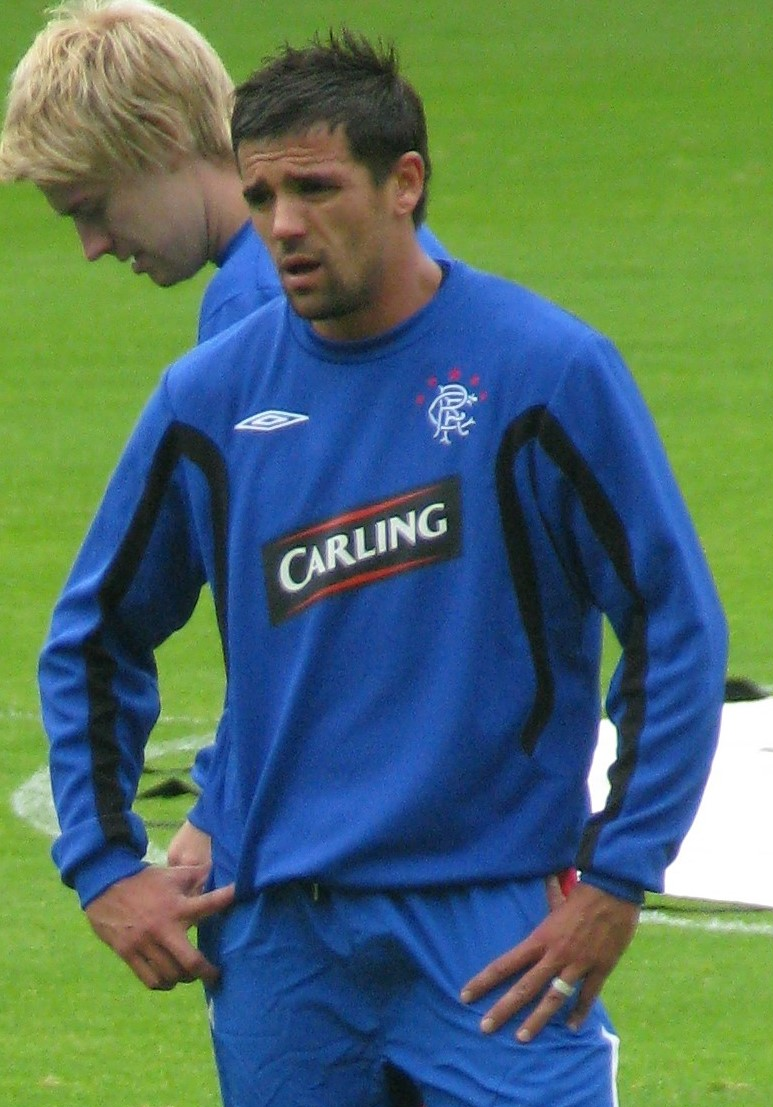
- Novo in 2009

Personal information
- Full name: Ignacio Javier Gómez Novo
- Date of birth: 26 March 1979 (age 47)
- Place of birth: Ferrol, Spain
- Height: 1.70 m (5 ft 7 in)
- Position: Forward

Team information
- Current team: Darvel (manager)

Senior career*
Years	Team	Apps	(Gls)
1997–1998	Racing Ferrol	1	(0)
1998–1999	Somozas	35	(16)
1999–2001	Huesca	38	(22)
2001–2002	Raith Rovers	33	(18)
2002–2004	Dundee	71	(26)
2004–2010	Rangers	179	(47)
2010–2012	Sporting Gijón	71	(7)
2012	Legia Warsaw	11	(0)
2012–2013	Huesca	34	(6)
2013	Greenock Morton	8	(1)
2014	Carlisle United	6	(0)
2014–2016	Carolina Railhawks	33	(14)
2016–2017	Glentoran	23	(3)
Total		543	(159)

Managerial career
- 2022–2023: Lexington SC U-23
- 2023: Lexington SC (interim)
- 2025-: Darvel
- * Club domestic league appearances and goals

Ignacio Javier Gómez Novo (Spanish pronunciation: [iɣˈnaθjo xaˈβjeɾ ˈnatʃo ˈɣomeθ ˈnoβo]; born 26 March 1979) is a Spanish former professional footballer who played as a forward. He is currently manager at Scottish 7th tier club Darvel.

Novo was an assistant coach and served as the interim head coach for the final 5 matches of the 2023 season for USL League One side Lexington SC, as well as the head coach for the club's U23 team.

He transferred from Huesca to Scottish club Raith Rovers in 2001 and Dundee a year later. In July 2004, he moved to Rangers for £450,000. During his first season at the club he scored 25 goals and won a league and League Cup double. He had to wait four years before lifting the league championship again in the 2008–09 season, where he also scored the winning goal in the 2009 Scottish Cup Final which won him his second double with the Ibrox club.

Following his time at Rangers, he had several short spells at clubs in Spain, Poland, Scotland, England, the United States and Northern Ireland.

== Early life ==
Novo was born in Ferrol, Galicia. His father, Ricardo Gómez Varela, was a centre half known as Richard who spent one year at Real Betis.

== Club career ==
=== Raith Rovers ===
Novo joined Raith Rovers from Huesca in July 2001. He made a scoring debut against Airdrieonians on 4 August, and netted the winner during a Challenge Cup match against Alloa Athletic three days later. Novo saw himself sent off in only his third match for Raith, whilst playing against Partick Thistle.

Despite this setback he went on to score consistently in the Scottish First Division, netting doubles against St Mirren and twice against Falkirk. Novo accumulated a total of 22 goals in 38 appearances during his first season in Scotland.

=== Dundee ===
His goal scoring record attracted the attention of Scottish Premier League club Dundee who signed him for £100,000 in July 2002. He made his Scottish Premier League debut on 3 August 2002 in a 1–1 draw with Hearts. Novo scored his first and second goals for the club against Dunfermline Athletic on 17 August but was sent-off in the dying moments of the match for raising his foot at Pars defender Scott Wilson. He went on to score a further seven goals to end the season with a tally of nine.

His second season saw Novo return to form, scoring four goals in the UEFA Cup, including one against then Serie A outfit Perugia, helped him to an end of season tally of 25. This form attracted the interest of several clubs including Celtic and Rangers. Celtic had a £500,000 bid accepted but failed to agree terms the player, stating Novo didn't have the "necessary level of commitment" during signing talks.

=== Rangers ===
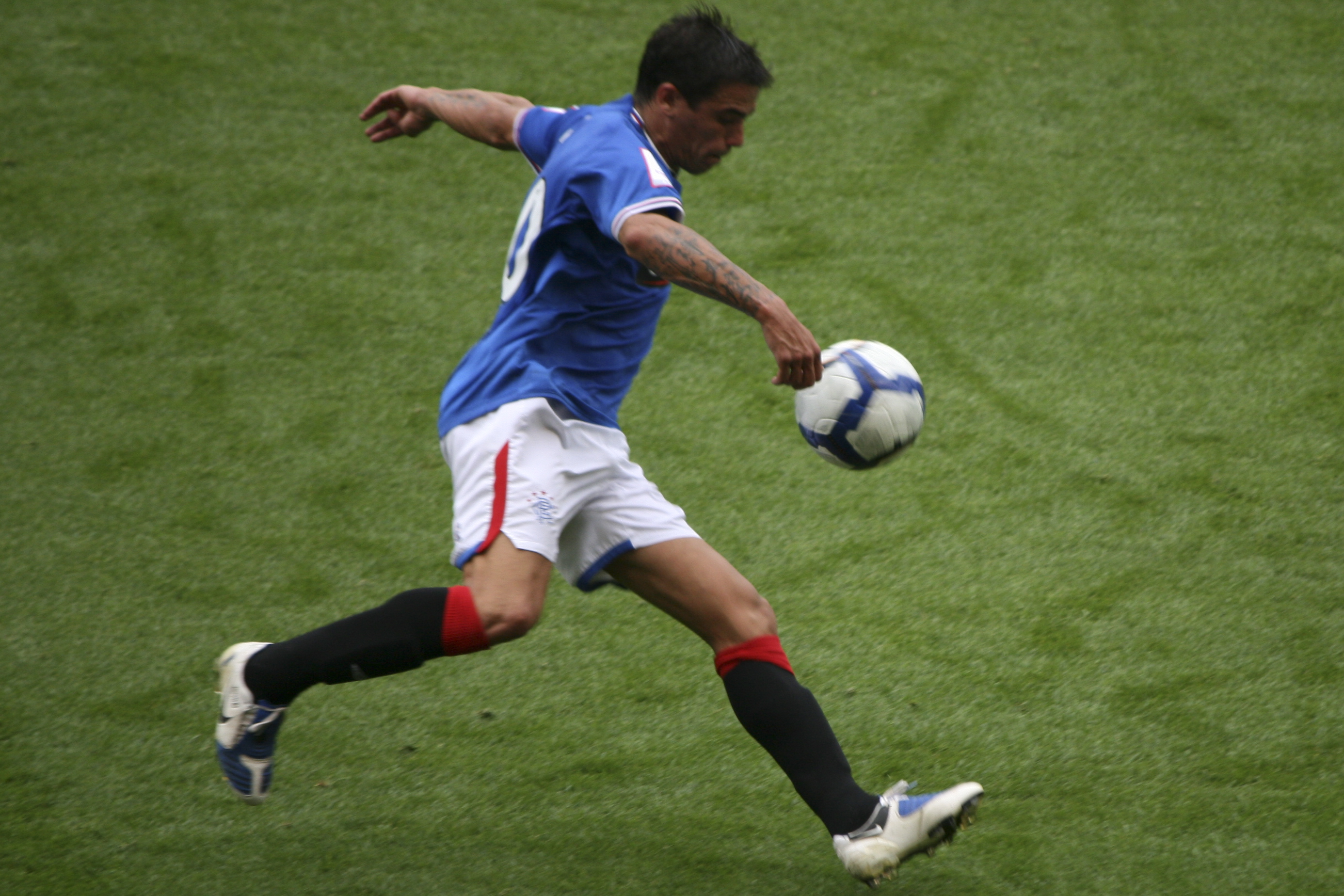
Novo playing for Rangers in 2009

Novo signed for Rangers on 6 July 2004 for a reported fee of £450,000. He was allocated the number 10 shirt that had been vacated by Michael Mols. In his first season at the club he scored 25 goals, including the goal against Hibernian that won Rangers the league title. He made his debut for Rangers in a Scottish Premier League match away to Aberdeen on 7 August 2004. His first goal came in his second appearance, netting in Rangers' 2–1 loss to Russian side CSKA Moscow on 10 August.

Following his first goal, Novo failed to score in his next eight appearances and he was dropped from the starting eleven. He came on as a 66th-minute substitute in a league match against his former employers Dundee. Novo netted two goals in as many minutes which helped Rangers to a 2–0 victory, after which he was a regular in the side.

At the start of the 2005–06 season, Novo broke his fifth metatarsal, which ruled him out for several months. Upon his return from injury he failed to score in the twenty matches he played the rest of that season, being deployed more as a winger than a striker due to the form of Kris Boyd. His three goals had come against Celtic, Falkirk and Cypriot club Anorthosis Famagusta.

With the departure of Alex McLeish and the arrival of Frenchman Paul Le Guen, Novo looked set to leave Rangers. However, a proposed transfer to English First Division club Coventry City fell through on transfer deadline day. Novo initially found his appearances sporadic, featuring in the first game of the season then waiting seven weeks for his second but after a mixture of poor results, injuries and his good performances for the reserves Novo returned to the first team. His first goal of that season, and in over a year, was during a 3–2 UEFA Cup win over Livorno on 19 October 2006. The following match, Novo came off the bench to score a late winner against St Mirren in a 3–2 win. He then started the next game, Motherwell held Rangers to a 1–1 draw with Novo named Man of the Match. His rejuvenated form continued with goals against Heart of Midlothian, Maccabi Haifa and AJ Auxerre. Novo continued to be a regular when Le Guen was replaced with Walter Smith.

The signings of strikers in the summer of 2007 led to increased competition for attacking positions and most of Novo's appearances in the early months of the season were as a substitute. On 20 October, he started the first Old Firm derby match of the season and scored twice in a 3–0 victory for Rangers over Celtic. On 2 December 2007, it was reported that Rangers were willing to offer Novo a one-year extension to his current contract, which was to expire in July 2008. However, Novo said that he would leave the club if he was not offered a longer contract. He was later offered a two-year contract extension until the summer of 2010, and signed the deal on 21 December 2007.

On 1 May 2008, he scored the winning penalty in the semi-final shoot-out against Fiorentina which put Rangers through to the 2008 UEFA Cup Final. During the 2007–08 season Novo was sent off twice, both in league games before cup finals, meaning that he missed both the 2008 League Cup final and the 2008 Scottish Cup final through suspension.

The 2008–09 season saw Novo used almost exclusively as a substitute. He came off the bench in the 2009 Scottish Cup Final to score the winning goal after only being on the field for 28 seconds.

During what turned out to be his final season with Rangers, he won both the league and Scottish League Cup, scoring nine times, but was mainly used as a substitute, starting just 14 league games. Novo decided not to sign a new contract as he was not getting enough starting opportunities.

On 30 March 2014, Novo was inducted into the Rangers Hall of Fame along with Fernando Ricksen and Lee McCulloch

=== Sporting de Gijón ===
In May 2010, Novo moved to La Liga side Sporting de Gijón, on a two-year deal. After a difficult first season in Spain, Novo was offered to clubs in the summer of 2011 with a return to Scotland being mooted. Aberdeen boss Craig Brown said that he had turned down the chance to sign Novo, but this was later denied by the player's agent.

Sporting boss Javier Clemente, branded Novo "a coward", and of "showing no commitment to the club in their time of need", and tore up Novo's contract. Clemente then states he “Went into the dressing room and told the rest of the players that if we had any other cowards they could also leave.”

=== Legia Warsaw and Huesca ===
On 16 February 2012, Novo signed a 6-month contract with Legia Warsaw. He made his debut on 26 February against Śląsk Wrocław and was substituted in the 59th minute with his side leading 3–0, Legia eventually winning 4–0. Novo made 11 League and 3 Cup appearances for Legia, scoring once in a 2–1 win over Arka Gdynia in the semi-final of the Polish Cup.

In July 2012 Novo returned to Spain to rejoin Second division side Huesca with whom he spent a successful 2-year spell between 1999 and 2001. Novo's second spell at the club was less successful than his first, scoring only 6 league goals. In November 2012, Novo was sent off after scoring in a 2–1 win over Guadalajara for gestures made towards the crowd. Novo protested his innocence, stating that the 'gestures' were in fact a "dedication" towards his late mother. Huesca ended being relegated at the end of the season, and Novo became a free agent.

=== Later career ===
Novo signed a short-term contract with Scottish Championship club Greenock Morton in October 2013, in a deal that was scheduled to run until 12 January 2014. However, after a disappointing return of only one goal, and with Morton at the bottom of the Championship, Novo was released from his contract ahead of schedule on 24 December.

On 11 February 2014, Novo signed a short-term deal until the end of the 2013–14 season with Football League One side Carlisle United. He was released in May following their relegation, after appearing in only six matches.

On 11 September 2014, Novo signed for Carolina RailHawks of USL Pro.

On 26 July 2016, it was announced Novo would join Northern Ireland Football League team Glentoran. A few weeks after his arrival in Belfast, Novo was warned by police that he was under a death threat from dissident republicans. The latter part of his season was marred by a six-game ban for a headbutt against Crusaders in January. After scoring a total of 4 goals in 28 games, he was released in May 2017.

After leaving Glentoran, it was reported that Novo hoped to move into a coaching role, however by the end of 2017 Novo had instead announced plans to open a Rangers-themed bar in Glasgow.

== International career ==
Novo was never selected for the Spain national team but has played for Galicia – his debut was in a 2008 friendly against Iran, arriving in his homeland just an hour before the match started after playing for Rangers against Celtic earlier in the day. He scored two goals and left to the acclaim of the Galician fans.

On 24 October 2008, it was reported that Novo could be selected by the Scotland national team as he was eligible to acquire a British passport, having lived in Scotland for eight years. This led to much debate amongst the Scottish media as to whether Novo, who was born in Spain and has no Scottish parents or grandparents, should be selected by Scotland. It eventually became clear, however, that the Home Nations would continue to honour a deal whereby that any player selected by England, Northern Ireland, Scotland or Wales would be required to have a blood tie to that country, or have had five years compulsory education within it. This deal would rule out the prospect of Novo playing for Scotland.

== Coaching ==
On 15 November 2022, Novo was named as an assistant coach for USL League One club Lexington SC, where he will also serve as the head coach of the club's U-23 team. The move reunites Novo with Sam Stockley, who was Novo's teammate at Carolina Railhawks.

Novo joined the coaching team at Drumchapel United in June 2024.

In November 2025, Novo took over as manager of West of Scotland Football League First Division side Darvel. He won his first match in charge, 6-0 against Ardrossan Winton Rovers.

== Personal life ==
Novo met Donna Clark in 2004 when playing in Scotland, and the couple were engaged a year later. During a lengthy engagement, they had a son together, Javier, before finally marrying in February 2015 where Novo's ex-Rangers team-mate, Marvin Andrews, acted as pastor. He resides in Scotland.

In January 2018, 38-year-old Novo suffered a heart attack while playing for a team of Rangers legends at the AOK Masters in Berlin. He was immediately rushed to hospital and underwent emergency surgery.

== Career statistics ==
Appearances and goals by club, season and competition
Club	Season	League			National cup (Note: Includes Scottish Cup, Copa del Rey, Polish Cup, U.S. Open Cup)		League cup (Note: Includes Scottish League Cup)		Continental		Other		Total	
Club	Season	Division	Apps	Goals	Apps	Goals	Apps	Goals	Apps	Goals	Apps	Goals	Apps	Goals
Raith Rovers	2001–02	Scottish First Division	33	18	1	0	2	1	–		2 (Note: Appearances in Scottish Challenge Cup)	3	38	22
Dundee	2002–03	Scottish Premier League	36	7	6	2	1	0	0	0	–		43	9
Dundee	2003–04	Scottish Premier League	35	19	2	1	3	1	4 (Note: Appearances in UEFA Cup)	4	–		44	25
Dundee	Total		71	26	8	3	4	1	4	4	0	0	87	34
Rangers	2004–05	Scottish Premier League	35	19	1	0	4	3	8 (Note: Two appearances and one goal in UEFA Champions League, six appearances and two goals in UEFA Cup)	3	–		48	25
Rangers	2005–06	Scottish Premier League	24	2	2	0	1	0	5 (Note: Appearances in UEFA Champions League)	1	–		32	3
Rangers	2006–07	Scottish Premier League	28	5	1	0	2	1	8	4	–		39	10
Rangers	2007–08	Scottish Premier League	28	10	4	2	3	2	14 (Note: Seven appearances and one goal in UEFA Champions League, seven appearances and one goal in UEFA Cup)	2	–		49	16
Rangers	2008–09	Scottish Premier League	29	5	3	2	4	2	2	1	–		38	10
Rangers	2009–10	Scottish Premier League	35	6	4	1	4	1	6	1	–		49	9
Rangers	Total		179	47	15	5	18	9	43	12	0	0	255	73
Sporting Gijón	2010–11	La Liga	31	4	1	0	–		–		–		32	4
Sporting Gijón	2011–12	La Liga	11	3	0	0	–		–		–		11	3
Sporting Gijón	Total		42	7	1	0	–		–		–		43	7
Legia Warsaw	2011–12	Ekstraklasa	11	0	4	1	–		–		–		15	1
Huesca	2012–13	La Liga	34	6	0	0	–		–		–		34	6
Greenock Morton	2013–14	Scottish Championship	8	1	1	0	1	0	–		–		10	1
Carlisle United	2013–14	League One	6	0	0	0	0	0	–		0	0	6	0
Carolina RailHawks	2014	NASL	8	3	0	0	0	0	–		–		8	3
Carolina RailHawks	2015	NASL	25	11	1	0	0	0	–		–		26	11
Carolina RailHawks	Total		33	14	1	0	0	0	0	0	0	0	34	14
Glentoran	2016–17	NIFL Premiership	23	3	0	0	0	0	–		–		23	3
Career total			440	122	31	9	25	11	47	16	2	3	545	161

== Honours ==
Rangers

- Scottish Premier League: 2004–05, 2008–09, 2009–10
- Scottish Cup: 2008–09
- Scottish League Cup: 2004–05, 2009–10
- UEFA Cup runner-up: 2007–08

Legia Warsaw

- Polish Cup: 2011–12

Individual

- Rangers Hall of Fame Inductee: 2014
