= 2004–05 Scottish Premier League =

99th season of top-tier football league in Scotland

Scottish Premier League
- Season: 2004–05
- Dates: 6 August 2004 – 21 May 2005
- Champions: Rangers; 4th Premier League title 51st Scottish title
- Relegated: Dundee
- Champions League: Rangers; Celtic
- UEFA Cup: Hibernian; Dundee United
- Intertoto Cup: None
- Matches: 228
- Goals: 595 (2.61 per match)
- Top goalscorer: John Hartson (25)
- Biggest home win: Celtic 6–0 Dunfermline (12 March)
- Biggest away win: Livingston 0–4 Celtic (13 April)

The 2004–05 Scottish Premier League was won by Rangers, who claimed the title on the final day of the season by a single point from Celtic, who had gone into the final fixtures leading and were still ahead in the closing minutes of their last game against Motherwell until they conceded two goals (both scored by striker Scott McDonald), costing them the title with Rangers winning their match against Hibernian in Edinburgh. The dramatic events became known in popular culture as 'Helicopter Sunday' due to the aircraft ceremonially delivering the championship trophy changing direction in mid-flight as the identity of its winners altered suddenly.

As league champions, Rangers qualified for the UEFA Champions League group stage, with runners-up Celtic also qualifying to the third qualifying round. Third-placed Hibernian qualified for the UEFA Cup, as did Dundee United, who took the Scottish Cup place despite losing the final to Celtic.

Dundee were relegated, and Scottish First Division winners Falkirk were promoted.

John Hartson was the top scorer with 25 goals for Celtic, whose manager Martin O'Neill stepped down at the end of the season after five years and a host of major trophies.

== Teams ==
=== Promotion and relegation from 2003–04 ===
Promoted from First Division to Premier League

- Inverness Caledonian Thistle

Relegated from Premier League to First Division

- Partick Thistle

=== Stadia and locations ===
Aberdeen	Celtic	Dundee	Dundee United
Pittodrie Stadium	Celtic Park	Dens Park	Tannadice Park
Capacity: 20,866	Capacity: 60,411	Capacity: 11,506	Capacity: 14,223
Dunfermline Athletic	Location of teams in 2004–05 Scottish Premier League		Heart of Midlothian
East End Park	Location of teams in 2004–05 Scottish Premier League		Tynecastle Park
Capacity: 12,509	Location of teams in 2004–05 Scottish Premier League		Capacity: 17,420
Hibernian	Location of teams in 2004–05 Scottish Premier League		Inverness Caledonian Thistle
Easter Road	Location of teams in 2004–05 Scottish Premier League		Caledonian Stadium
Capacity: 16,531	Location of teams in 2004–05 Scottish Premier League		Capacity: 7,500
Kilmarnock	Livingston	Motherwell	Rangers
Rugby Park	Almondvale Stadium	Fir Park	Ibrox Stadium
Capacity: 17,889	Capacity: 10,016	Capacity: 13,677	Capacity: 50,817

=== Personnel ===
Team	Manager
Aberdeen	(Scotland) Jimmy Calderwood
Celtic	(Northern Ireland) Martin O'Neill
Dundee	(Scotland) Jim Duffy
Dundee United	(Scotland) Gordon Chisholm
Dunfermline Athletic	(Scotland) Jim Leishman
Heart of Midlothian	(Scotland) Steven Pressley (Scotland) John McGlynn (joint caretakers)
Hibernian	(England) Tony Mowbray
Inverness Caledonian Thistle	(Scotland) Craig Brewster
Kilmarnock	(Scotland) Jim Jefferies
Livingston	(Scotland) Richard Gough
Motherwell	(England) Terry Butcher
Rangers	(Scotland) Alex McLeish

==== Managerial changes ====
Team	Outgoing manager	Date of vacancy	Manner of departure	Position in table	Incoming manager	Date of appointment
Aberdeen	(Scotland) Steve Paterson	24 May 2004	Sacked	Pre-season	(Scotland) Jimmy Calderwood	28 May 2004
Dunfermline Athletic	(Scotland) Jimmy Calderwood	28 May 2004	Signed by Aberdeen	Pre-season	(Scotland) David Hay	17 June 2004
Livingston	(Scotland) David Hay	1 June 2004	Contract Expired	Pre-season	(Scotland) Allan Preston	4 June 2004
Heart of Midlothian	(Scotland) Craig Levein	29 October 2004	Signed by Leicester City	6th	(Scotland) John Robertson	3 November 2004
Inverness Caledonian Thistle	(Scotland) John Robertson	3 November 2004	Signed by Heart of Midlothian	9th	(Scotland) Craig Brewster	25 November 2004
Livingston	(Scotland) Allan Preston	25 November 2004	Sacked	12th	(Scotland) Richard Gough	30 November 2004
Dundee United	(Scotland) Ian McCall	14 March 2005	Sacked	12th	(Scotland) Gordon Chisholm	14 March 2005 (interim); 14 May 2005 (permanent)
Dunfermline Athletic	(Scotland) David Hay	3 May 2005	Sacked	12th	(Scotland) Jim Leishman	3 May 2005
Heart of Midlothian	(Scotland) John Robertson	9 May 2005	Sacked	5th	(Scotland) Steven Pressley (Scotland) John McGlynn (joint caretakers)	11 May 2005

== League table ==
Pos	Team	Pld	W	D	L	GF	GA	GD	Pts	Qualification or relegation (Note: Teams played each other three times (33 matches), before the league split into two groups (the top six and the bottom six) for the last five matches.)
1	Rangers (C)	38	29	6	3	78	22	+56	93	Qualification for the Champions League third qualifying round
2	Celtic	38	30	2	6	85	35	+50	92	Qualification for the Champions League second qualifying round
3	Hibernian	38	18	7	13	64	57	+7	61	Qualification for the UEFA Cup first round
4	Aberdeen	38	18	7	13	44	39	+5	61	
5	Heart of Midlothian	38	13	11	14	43	41	+2	50	
6	Motherwell	38	13	9	16	46	49	−3	48	
7	Kilmarnock	38	15	4	19	49	55	−6	49	
8	Inverness Caledonian Thistle	38	11	11	16	41	47	−6	44	
9	Dundee United	38	8	12	18	41	59	−18	36	Qualification for the UEFA Cup second qualifying round (Note: As Celtic, the 2004–05 Scottish Cup winners, qualified for the UEFA Champions League via their league position, the place in the UEFA Cup was passed onto Dundee United, the cup runners-up.)
10	Livingston	38	9	8	21	34	61	−27	35	
11	Dunfermline Athletic	38	8	10	20	34	60	−26	34	
12	Dundee (R)	38	8	9	21	37	71	−34	33	Relegation to the Scottish First Division

Source: Scottish Professional Football League
Rules for classification: 1) Points; 2) Goal difference; 3) Goals scored
(C) Champions; (R) Relegated

== Results ==
=== Matches 1–22 ===
During matches 1–22 each team played every other team twice (home and away).

Home \ Away	ABE	CEL	DND	DUN	DNF	HOM	HIB	INV	KIL	LIV	MOT	RAN
Aberdeen		0–1	1–1	1–0	2–1	0–1	0–1	0–0	3–2	2–0	2–1	0–0
Celtic	2–3		3–0	1–0	3–0	3–0	2–1	3–0	2–1	2–1	2–0	1–0
Dundee	1–0	2–2		1–0	1–2	0–1	1–4	3–1	3–1	0–0	1–2	0–2
Dundee United	1–1	0–3	1–2		1–2	1–1	1–4	2–1	3–0	1–0	0–1	1–1
Dunfermline Athletic	0–1	0–2	3–1	1–1		1–0	1–1	1–1	4–1	0–0	1–1	1–2
Heart of Midlothian	0–0	0–2	3–0	3–2	3–0		2–1	1–0	3–0	0–0	0–1	0–0
Hibernian	2–1	2–2	4–4	2–0	2–1	1–1		2–1	0–1	2–1	1–0	0–1
Inverness Caledonian Thistle	1–3	1–3	2–1	1–1	2–0	1–1	1–2		0–2	2–0	1–1	1–1
Kilmarnock	0–1	2–4	3–1	5–2	1–0	1–1	3–1	2–2		1–3	2–0	0–1
Livingston	0–2	2–4	1–0	1–1	2–0	1–2	0–2	3–0	0–2		2–3	1–4
Motherwell	0–0	2–3	3–0	4–2	2–1	2–0	1–2	1–2	0–1	2–0		0–2
Rangers	5–0	2–0	3–0	1–1	3–0	3–2	4–1	1–0	2–0	4–0	4–1	

Legend: Blue = home team win; Yellow = draw; Red = away team win.

=== Matches 23–33 ===
During matches 23–33 each team played every other team once (either at home or away).

Home \ Away	ABE	CEL	DND	DUN	DNF	HOM	HIB	INV	KIL	LIV	MOT	RAN
Aberdeen			1–1				3–0			2–0	1–3	1–2
Celtic	3–2		3–0		6–0	0–2					2–0	0–2
Dundee					2–1	1–1			1–0	0–1	2–1	0–2
Dundee United	1–2	2–3	2–2			2–1		1–1				
Dunfermline Athletic	2–1			1–1		1–1	1–4				0–0	0–1
Heart of Midlothian	1–0						1–2	0–2	3–0	3–1		1–2
Hibernian		1–3	4–0	3–2					3–0	0–3		
Inverness Caledonian Thistle	0–1	0–2	3–2		2–0		3–0				1–0	
Kilmarnock	0–1	0–1		3–0	2–1			0–1				
Livingston		0–4		0–2	1–1			1–4	3–1		1–1	
Motherwell				2–0		2–0	1–1		1–1			2–3
Rangers				0–1			3–0	1–1	2–1	3–0		

Legend: Blue = home team win; Yellow = draw; Red = away team win.

=== Matches 34–38 ===
During matches 34–38 each team played every other team in their half of the table once.

==== Top six ====
Home \ Away	ABE	CEL	HOM	HIB	MOT	RAN
Aberdeen			2–0			1–3
Celtic	2–0			1–3		
Heart of Midlothian		1–2			0–0	
Hibernian	1–2		2–2			0–1
Motherwell	0–1	2–1		2–2		
Rangers		1–2	2–1		4–1	

Legend: Blue = home team win; Yellow = draw; Red = away team win.

==== Bottom six ====
Home \ Away	DND	DUN	DNF	INV	KIL	LIV
Dundee		1–2		1–1		
Dundee United			0–1		1–1	1–1
Dunfermline Athletic	5–0			0–0		
Inverness Caledonian Thistle		0–1			1–2	0–1
Kilmarnock	1–0		4–0			2–0
Livingston	1–1		2–0			

Legend: Blue = home team win; Yellow = draw; Red = away team win.

== Top scorers ==
Scorer	Club	Goals
(Wales) John Hartson	Celtic	25
(Scotland) Derek Riordan	Hibernian	20
(Spain) Nacho Novo	Rangers	19
(Croatia) Dado Pršo	Rangers	18
(Scotland) Kris Boyd	Kilmarnock	17
(Australia) Scott McDonald	Motherwell	15
(Scotland) Garry O'Connor	Hibernian	14
(England) Steve Lovell	Dundee	12
(England) Chris Sutton	Celtic	12
(Scotland) Darren Mackie	Aberdeen	12
(Bulgaria) Stiliyan Petrov	Celtic	11
(Scotland) Paul Hartley	Hearts	11

Source: SPL official website

== Attendances ==
The average attendances for SPL clubs during the 2004–05 season are shown below:

Team	Average
Celtic	57,906
Rangers	48,676
Aberdeen	13,576
Hibernian	12,541
Hearts	12,219
Dundee United	8,210
Motherwell	6,960
Dundee	6,879
Dunfermline Athletic	6,192
Kilmarnock	5,930
Livingston	5,157
Inverness CT	4,067

Source: SPL official website

== Awards ==
=== Monthly awards ===
Month	Manager	Player	Young Player
August	(Scotland) Jimmy Calderwood (Aberdeen)	(England) Alan Thompson (Celtic)	(Scotland) Alexander Diamond (Aberdeen)
September	(England) Terry Butcher (Motherwell)	(Australia) Scott McDonald (Motherwell)	(Scotland) Derek Riordan (Hibernian)
October	(Scotland) John Robertson (Inverness CT)	(Netherlands) Fernando Ricksen (Rangers)	(Scotland) Steven Fletcher (Hibernian)
November	(Scotland) Alex McLeish (Rangers)	(Spain) Nacho Novo (Rangers)	(Scotland) Derek Riordan (Hibernian)
December	(England) Tony Mowbray (Hibernian)	(Republic of Ireland) Aiden McGeady (Celtic)	(Scotland) Derek Riordan (Hibernian)
January	(Northern Ireland) Martin O'Neill (Celtic)	(England) Chris Sutton (Celtic)	(Scotland) Derek Riordan (Hibernian)
February	(Scotland) Alex McLeish (Rangers)	(Croatia) Dado Pršo (Rangers)	(Scotland) Lee Miller (Hearts)
March	(Scotland) Craig Brewster (Inverness CT)	(Wales) Craig Bellamy (Celtic)	(Republic of Ireland) Aiden McGeady (Celtic)
April	(Scotland) Gordon Chisholm (Dundee United)	(South Africa) Burton O'Brien (Livingston)	(Scotland) Lee Miller (Hearts)
May	(England) Tony Mowbray (Hibernian)	(Croatia) Dado Pršo (Rangers)	(Scotland) Derek Riordan (Hibernian)

=== Annual awards ===
- Player awards

Award	Winner	Club
PFA Players' Player of the Year (joint winners)	(Netherlands) Fernando Ricksen	Rangers
PFA Players' Player of the Year (joint winners)	(Wales) John Hartson	Celtic
PFA Young Player of the Year	(Scotland) Derek Riordan	Hibernian
SFWA Footballer of the Year	(Wales) John Hartson	Celtic
SFWA Young Player of the Year	(Scotland) Derek Riordan	Hibernian

- Manager awards

Award	Winner	Club
SFWA Manager of the Year	(England) Tony Mowbray	Hibernian
