= 2002–03 Dundee F.C. season =

Dundee
2002–03 season
- Manager: Jim Duffy
- Stadium: Dens Park
- Scottish Premier League: 6th
- Scottish Cup: Runner-up
- Scottish League Cup: Third round
Home colours

The 2002–03 season saw Dundee compete in the Scottish Premier League where they finished in 6th position with 44 points. They also reached the 2003 Scottish Cup Final where they lost 1–0 to Rangers.

== Final league table ==
Pos	Team	Pld	W	D	L	GF	GA	GD	Pts	Qualification or relegation (Note: Teams played each other three times (33 matches), before the league split into two groups (the top six and the bottom six) for the last five matches.)
4	Kilmarnock	38	16	9	13	47	56	−9	57	
5	Dunfermline Athletic	38	13	7	18	54	71	−17	46	
6	Dundee	38	10	14	14	50	60	−10	44	Qualification for the UEFA Cup first round (Note: As Rangers, the 2002–03 Scottish Cup winners, qualified for the UEFA Champions League via their league position, the place in the UEFA Cup was passed onto Dundee, the cup runners-up)
7	Hibernian	38	15	6	17	56	64	−8	51	
8	Aberdeen	38	13	10	15	41	54	−13	49	

Source: Scottish Professional Football League
Rules for classification: 1) Points; 2) Goal difference; 3) Goals scored

== Results ==
Dundee's score comes first

=== Legend ===
Win	Draw	Loss

=== Scottish Premier League ===
Match	Date	Opponent	Venue	Result	Attendance	Scorers
1	3 August 2002	Heart of Midlothian	H	1–1	7,705	Caballero 65'
2	10 August 2002	Rangers	A	0–3	47,004	
3	17 August 2002	Dunfermline Athletic	A	2–4	5,901	Novo (2) 22', 58'
4	24 August 2002	Hibernian	H	2–1	6,411	Caballero 79', Lovell 90'
5	31 August 2002	Dundee United	A	0–0	12,402	
6	11 September 2002	Livingston	H	2–1	5,391	Novo 52', Rae 77'
7	14 September 2002	Partick Thistle	A	1–1	4,552	Rae 50'
8	22 September 2002	Celtic	H	0–1	9,483	
9	28 September 2002	Motherwell	A	1–1	4,025	Lovell 14'
10	5 October 2002	Kilmarnock	H	2–1	5,567	Rae 67', Caballero 90'
11	19 October 2002	Aberdeen	A	0–0	14,003	
12	26 October 2002	Heart of Midlothian	A	2–1	10,169	Lovell (2) 26', 67'
13	2 November 2002	Rangers	H	0–3	10,124	
14	12 November 2002	Dunfermline Athletic	H	2–3	5,475	Nicholson 8' (o.g.), Lovell 19'
15	16 November 2002	Hibernian	A	1–2	8,870	Novo 90'
16	23 November 2002	Dundee United	H	3–2	11,539	Caballero (2) 11', 30', Hernández 55'
17	30 November 2002	Livingston	A	1–1	5,307	Novo 72'
18	4 December 2002	Partick Thistle	H	4–1	5,363	Brady 38', Sara 51', Lovell (2) 67', 75'
19	7 December 2002	Kilmarnock	A	0–2	4,810	
20	14 December 2002	Motherwell	H	1–1	5,527	Sara 35'
21	21 December 2002	Celtic	A	0–2	56,162	
22	26 December 2002	Aberdeen	H	1–2	8,574	Milne 87'
23	29 December 2002	Heart of Midlothian	H	1–2	7,340	Milne 57'
24	2 January 2003	Rangers	A	1–3	49,112	Lovell 23'
25	28 January 2003	Dunfermline Athletic	A	1–0	4,237	Nicholson 13'
26	9 February 2003	Dundee United	A	1–1	10,457	Novo 30'
27	25 February 2003	Hibernian	H	3–0	8,414	Rae 9', Milne 86', Murray 90' (o.g.)
28	1 March 2003	Partick Thistle	A	3–1	4,599	Milne 15', Mackay 26', Novo 78'
29	5 March 2003	Livingston	H	0–0	7,554	
30	8 March 2003	Kilmarnock	H	2–2	6,531	Wilkie 39', Milne 41'
31	15 March 2003	Aberdeen	A	3–3	12,119	Lovell 16', Caballero 24', Wilkie 81'
32	6 April 2003	Celtic	H	1–1	9,013	Burchill 20'
33	12 April 2003	Motherwell	A	2–1	4,963	Burchill 2', Milne 24'
34	27 April 2003	Kilmarnock	H	0–1	5,964	
35	4 May 2003	Rangers	H	2–2	9,195	Caballero (2) 17', 28'
36	10 May 2003	Dunfermline Athletic	H	2–2	5,411	Lovell (2) 17', 58'
37	14 May 2003	Celtic	A	2–6	57,542	Smith 26', Mair 90'
38	25 May 2003	Heart of Midlothian	A	0–1	12,205	

=== Scottish Cup ===
Match	Date	Opponent	Venue	Result	Attendance	Scorers
R3	25 January 2003	Partick Thistle	H	2–0	4,825	Nemsadze 14', Rae 82'
R4	22 February 2003	Aberdeen	H	2–0	7,549	Lovell 22', Novo 41'
Quarter final	22 March 2003	Falkirk	A	1–1	7,403	Novo 66'
Quarter final Replay	9 April 2003	Falkirk	H	4–1 (AET)	9,562	Caballero 44', Burchill 94', Lovell (2) 99', 107'
Semi final	20 April 2003	Inverness Caledonian Thistle	A	1–0	14,429	Nemsadze 78'
Final	31 May 2003	Rangers	N	0–1	47,136	

=== Scottish League Cup ===
Match	Date	Opponent	Venue	Result	Attendance	Scorers
R2	25 September 2002	Queen of the South	H	3–1	2,190	Sara (2) 17', 39', Caballero 21'
R3	22 October 2002	Partick Thistle	A	0–1	2,652	
