= 2002–03 Rangers F.C. season =

Rangers
2002–03 season
- Chairman: John McClelland
- Manager: Alex McLeish
- Ground: Ibrox Stadium
- Scottish Premier League: 1st (champions)
- Scottish Cup: Winners
- League Cup: Winners
- UEFA Cup: First round
- Top goalscorer: League: Barry Ferguson; Ronald de Boer (16 each); All: Ronald de Boer (20 goals)
Home colours	Away colours	Third colours

The 2002–03 season was the 123rd season of competitive football by Rangers.

== Overview ==
Rangers played a total of 50 competitive matches during the 2002–03 season. They won their seventh domestic treble in manager Alex McLeish's first full season in charge, having taken over from Dick Advocaat the previous season. The league championship was won on goal difference in the last match of the season with a 6–1 win against Dunfermline Athletic. The club finished on +73 GD, just one ahead of Celtic.

The League Cup was won with a 2–1 final win against Celtic and the Scottish Cup with a 1–0 win against Dundee. Despite domestic success, Rangers crashed out of Europe at the first round stage to little known Czech team Victoria Zizkov losing on the away goals rule.

== Players ==
=== Transfers ===
==== In ====
Date	Player	From	Fee
1 July 2002	(Spain) Mikel Arteta	(Spain) Barcelona	£5,800,000
1 July 2002	(Australia) Kevin Muscat	(England) Wolverhampton Wanderers	Free
26 December 2002	(Scotland) Steven Thompson	(Scotland) Dundee United	£200,000
27 January 2003	(France) Jérôme Bonnissel	(France) Bordeaux	Free
31 January 2003	(Norway) Dan Eggen	(Spain) Alavés	Free

==== Out ====
Date	Player	To	Fee
20 May 2002	(Chile) Sebastian Rozental	(Switzerland) Grasshopper	Free
1 June 2002	(Scotland) Scott Wilson	(Scotland) Dunfermline Athletic	Free
1 June 2002	(Russia) Andrei Kanchelskis	(England) Southampton	Free
1 June 2002	(Australia) Tony Vidmar	(England) Middlesbrough	Free
16 June 2002	(Northern Ireland) Lee Feeney	(Northern Ireland) Linfield	Free
20 June 2002	(Finland) Tero Penttilä	(Finland) HJK Helsinki	Free
20 June 2002	(Finland) Jani Kauppila	(Finland) Tervarit	Free
23 July 2002	(Denmark) Jesper Christiansen	(Germany) VfL Wolfsburg	Loan
30 August 2002	(Norway) Tore André Flo	(England) Sunderland	£6,750,000
30 October 2002	(Poland) Dariusz Adamczuk		Contract terminated
30 December 2002	(Scotland) Billy Dodds	(Scotland) Dundee United	Free
31 December 2002	(England) Paul Reid	(England) Northampton Town	Loan
14 January 2003	(Trinidad and Tobago) Russell Latapy	(Scotland) Dundee United	Free

- Expenditure: ▼£6,000,000
- Income: ▲£6,750,000
- Total loss/gain: ▲£750,000

=== Player statistics ===
				Total			Scottish Premier League		UEFA Cup		Scottish Cup		League Cup	
No.	Pos.	Nat.	Name	Sts	App	Gls	App	Gls	App	Gls	App	Gls	App	Gls
1	GK	(Germany)	Stefan Klos	50	50		38		2		6		4	
2	DF	(Netherlands)	Fernando Ricksen	46	46	3	35	3	2		5		4	
3	DF	(Australia)	Craig Moore	51	44	4	35	3	2		5	1	2	
4	DF	(Italy)	Lorenzo Amoruso	32	32	6	24	4	1		5	2	2	
5	DF	(Netherlands)	Arthur Numan	35	35	1	26	1	1		5		3	
6	MF	(Scotland)	Barry Ferguson	48	48	18	36	16	2		6	2	4	
7	FW	(Argentina)	Claudio Caniggia	14	36	12	26	8	2		4	1	4	3
8	MF	(Germany)	Christian Nerlinger		3		3							
9	FW	(Norway)	Tore Andre Flo	1	4		4							
10	FW	(Netherlands)	Michael Mols	30	35	14	27	13	1		4	1	3	
11	MF	(Scotland)	Neil McCann	16	26	3	18	2	1	1	6		1	
12	DF	(Scotland)	Robert Malcolm	26	33	1	24	1	1		6		2	
14	MF	(Netherlands)	Ronald de Boer	43	43	20	33	16	2	2	5	1	3	1
15	DF	(Netherlands)	Bert Konterman	10	24	1	16		2		3	1	3	
16	FW	(Scotland)	Billy Dodds	1	6		6							
16	DF	(France)	Jérôme Bonnissel	3	4		3						1	
17	DF	(Australia)	Kevin Muscat	26	29		22		2		4		1	
19	FW	(Scotland)	Steven Thompson	1	11	2	8	2					3	
20	MF	(Trinidad and Tobago)	Russell Latapy	2	8		7		1					
21	DF	(Scotland)	Maurice Ross	22	27	1	20	1	1		2		4	
22	GK	(Scotland)	Allan McGregor											
23	MF	(Spain)	Mikel Arteta	34	35	5	27	4	1		3	1	4	
24	FW	(Georgia (country))	Shota Arveladze	31	40	16	30	15	2		6	1	2	
26	MF	(Denmark)	Peter Løvenkrands	27	33	12	27	9	2		1	1	3	2
27	MF	(Scotland)	Stephen Hughes	7	16	1	12	1			2		2	
36	FW	(Scotland)	Steven MacLean		4		3				1			
53	DF	(Scotland)	Alan Hutton	1	1		1							

Last updated: 9 May 2003
Ordered by squad numbers
0 shown as blank

== Matches ==
=== Friendlies ===
Game	Date	Tournament	Round	Ground	Opponent	Score^{1}	Report
1	11 July 2002	Friendly		N	NJC All Stars	3–0	Report / Report link; Attendance / 500; NJC All Stars / Rangers; / 20' Amoruso; 42' Mols; 55' Konterman
2	13 July 2002	Friendly		N	River Plate	2–3	Report / [http://rangers.co.uk/news/features/on-this-day-river-at-giants/? Report link]; Attendance / 22,070; Referee / Jair Marrufo; River Plate / Rangers; 17' Ayala; 51' Zapata; 79' López / 61' Arveladze; 77' Amoruso; (red card) Numan
3	17 July 2002	Friendly		N	Reading Rage	4–1	Attendance / 1,000; Reading Rage / Rangers; / Ferguson (pen.) Ferguson; Arveladze; Flo
4	20 July 2002	Friendly		N	Santos	0–1	Kick off / 16:00 EDT; Attendance / 13,200; Referee / Alex Prus; Santos / Rangers; Diego
5	28 July 2002	Friendly		H	AC Milan	2–2	Report / Report link; Kick off / 15:00 BST; Attendance / 40,411; Rangers / Milan; 15' de Boer; 42' Caniggia / 45' Tomasson; 79' Borriello
6	30 July 2002	Friendly		A	Linfield	2–0	Report / Report link; Kick off / 15:00 BST; Attendance / 18,000; Linfield / Rangers; / 29' Dodds; 70' Flo
7	7 August 2002	Friendly		H	Leeds United	1–1	Report / Report link; Kick off / 19:45 BST; Attendance / 32,497; Rangers / Leeds United; 49' (pen.) Arveladze / 17' Smith
8	18 January 2003	Friendly		N	Energie Cottbus	1–1	Report / Report link; Kick off / 20:00 GST; Attendance / 3,000; Rangers / Energie Cottbus; 90' (pen.) Muscat / Reghecampf

Last updated: 18 January 2003
^{1}Rangers goals come first.
National flags for Ground and Opponent columns are only shown when different from that of Rangers.
M = Match; Ground: H = Home, A = Away, N = Neutral, HR = Home replacement, AR = Away replacement.

=== Scottish Premier League ===
Game	Date	Tournament	Round	Ground	Opponent	Score^{1}	Report
1	3 August 2002	Scottish Premier League	1	A	Kilmarnock	1–1	Report / Report link; Kick off / 15:00 BST; Attendance / 13,972; Referee / Kenny Clark (Scotland); Kilmarnock / Rangers; 80' McLaren / 30' Arveladze
2	10 August 2002	Scottish Premier League	2	H	Dundee	3–0	Report / Report link; Kick off / 15:00 BST; Attendance / 47,044; Referee / Alan Freeland (Scotland); Rangers / Dundee; 12' de Boer; 67' Arveladze; 88' Løvenkrands
3	18 August 2002	Scottish Premier League	3	A	Hibernian	4–2	Report / Report link; Kick off / 15:00 BST; Attendance / 11,633; Referee / Hugh Dallas (Scotland); Hibernian / Rangers; 35' Townsley; (yellow card) 66' (red card) Luna; 89' O'Connor / 6' de Boer; 45' (pen.) Ferguson; 65' Løvenkrands; 87' Løvenkrands
4	25 August 2002	Scottish Premier League	4	H	Aberdeen	2–0	Report / Report link; Kick off / 15:00 BST; Attendance / 49,219; Referee / John Underhill (Scotland); Rangers / Aberdeen; 30' de Boer; 78' (pen.) Ferguson / (yellow card) 78' (red card) McNaughton
5	1 September 2002	Scottish Premier League	5	A	Dunfermline Athletic	6–0	Report / Report link; Kick off / BST; Attendance / 8,948; Referee / Dougie McDonald (Scotland); Dunfermline Athletic / Rangers; / 11' Caniggia; 27' Arteta; 41' Ricksen; 57' (pen.) Ferguson; 59' Caniggia; 68' Caniggia
6	11 September 2002	Scottish Premier League	6	H	Heart of Midlothian	2–0	Report / Report link; Kick off / 19:45 BST; Attendance / 48,581; Referee / Mike McCurry (Scotland); Rangers / Heart of Midlothian; 41' Caniggia; 79' Arveladze
7	14 September 2002	Scottish Premier League	7	A	Livingston	2–0	Report / Report link; Kick off / 15:00 BST; Attendance / 10,003; Referee / Kenny Clark (Scotland); Livingston / Rangers; (yellow card) 58' (red card) Mamam / 61' Ross; 87' (pen.) Ferguson
9	21 September 2002	Scottish Premier League	8	H	Partick Thistle	3–0	Report / Report link; Kick off / 15:00 BST; Attendance / 48,696; Referee / Kevin Toner (Scotland); Rangers / Partick Thistle; 3' Løvenkrands; 28' de Boer; 70' de Boer
10	28 September 2002	Scottish Premier League	9	A	Dundee United	3–0	Report / Report link; Kick off / 12:30 BST; Attendance / 10,013; Referee / John Rowbotham (Scotland); Dundee United / Rangers; / 22' Amoruso; 45' Ferguson; 73' Arveladze
12	6 October 2002	Scottish Premier League	10	A	Celtic	3–3	Report / Report link; Kick off / 14:15 BST; Attendance / 59,027; Referee / Stuart Dougal (Scotland); Celtic / Rangers; 39' Larsson; 53' Larsson; 78' Sutton / 6' Arteta; 54' de Boer; 75' Arveladze
13	19 October 2002	Scottish Premier League	11	H	Motherwell	3–0	Report / Report link; Kick off / 15:00 BST; Attendance / 49,376; Referee / Alan Freeland (Scotland); Rangers / Motherwell; 2' Amoruso; 72' Løvenkrands; 90' de Boer / (red card) 77' Partridge
15	27 October 2002	Scottish Premier League	12	H	Kilmarnock	6–1	Report / Report link; Kick off / 15:00 GMT; Attendance / 48,368; Referee / Willie Young (Scotland); Rangers / Kilmarnock; 5' Mols; 15' Mols; 26' de Boer; 34' Ferguson; 67' Moore; 71' (pen.) Ferguson / 44' Fulton
16	2 November 2002	Scottish Premier League	13	A	Dundee	3–0	Report / Report link; Kick off / 12:30 GMT; Attendance / 10,124; Referee / Ian Fyfe (Scotland); Dundee / Rangers; (red card) 45' Khizanishvili / 30' Malcolm; 50' Løvenkrands; 79' Moore
18	10 November 2002	Scottish Premier League	14	H	Hibernian	2–1	Report / Report link; Kick off / 15:00 GMT; Attendance / 48,798; Referee / Mike McCurry (Scotland); Rangers / Hibernian; 11' Mols; 35' Arveladze / 45' McManus
19	16 November 2002	Scottish Premier League	15	A	Aberdeen	2–2	Report / Report link; Kick off / 12:30 GMT; Attendance / 14,915; Referee / Stuart Dougal (Scotland); Rangers / Aberdeen; 24' Numan; 78' (pen.) Ferguson / 56' Mike; 74' Mackie
20	23 November 2002	Scottish Premier League	16	H	Dunfermline Athletic	3–0	Report / Report link; Kick off / 15:00 GMT; Attendance / 48,431; Referee / John Underhill (Scotland); Rangers / Dunfermline Athletic; 60' McCann; 81' Mols; 83' Arveladze / (red card) 60' Kilgannon
21	1 December 2002	Scottish Premier League	17	A	Heart of Midlothian	4–0	Report / Report link; Kick off / 15:00 GMT; Attendance / 12,156; Referee / Hugh Dallas (Scotland); Heart of Midlothian / Rangers; (yellow card) 58' (red card) Maybury / 52' Ricksen; 79' (pen.) Ferguson; 81' Ricksen; 90' Hughes
22	4 December 2002	Scottish Premier League	18	H	Livingston	4–3	Report / Report link; Kick off / 19:45 GMT; Attendance / 45,992; Referee / Dougie McDonald (Scotland); Rangers / Livingston; 8' Ferguson; 10' Arveladze; 18' Arveladze; 46' Arveladze / 50' Zárate; 72' Wilson; (yellow card) 75' (red card) Bollan; 87' Zárate
23	7 December 2002	Scottish Premier League	19	H	Celtic	3–2	Report / Report link; Kick off / 12:30 GMT; Attendance / 50,022; Referee / Kenny Clark (Scotland); Rangers / Celtic; 10' Moore; 35' de Boer; 40' Mols / 1' Sutton; 61' Hartson
24	14 December 2002	Scottish Premier League	20	H	Dundee United	3–0	Report / Report link; Kick off / 15:00 GMT; Attendance / 47,639; Referee / Stuart Dougal (Scotland); Rangers / Dundee United; 13' Ferguson; 56' Ferguson; (red card) 60' Ricksen; 86' (pen.) Ferguson / (red card) 80' McIntyre
25	22 December 2002	Scottish Premier League	21	A	Partick Thistle	2–1	Report / Report link; Kick off / 15:00 GMT; Attendance / 8,022; Referee / John Underhill (Scotland); Partick Thistle / Rangers; 7' Burns; (red card) 72' Britton / 70' Mols; 79' de Boer
26	26 December 2002	Scottish Premier League	22	A	Motherwell	0–1	Report / Report link; Kick off / 15:00 GMT; Attendance / 11,234; Referee / Willie Young (Scotland); Motherwell / Rangers; 65' McFadden
27	29 December 2002	Scottish Premier League	23	A	Kilmarnock	1–0	Report / Report link; Kick off / 15:00 GMT; Attendance / 13,396; Referee / Dougie McDonald (Scotland); Kilmarnock / Rangers; / 24' Løvenkrands
28	2 January 2003	Scottish Premier League	24	H	Dundee	3–1	Report / Report link; Kick off / 15:00 GMT; Attendance / 49,112; Referee / Tom Brown (Scotland); Rangers / Dundee; 21' Ferguson; 44' de Boer; 82' Thompson / 23' Lovell
30	29 January 2003	Scottish Premier League	25	A	Hibernian	2–0	Report / Report link; Kick off / 19:45 GMT; Attendance / 13,686; Referee / Kenny Clark (Scotland); Hibernian / Rangers; (yellow card) 90' (red card) Smith / 58' Ferguson; 85' Caniggia
31	1 February 2003	Scottish Premier League	26	H	Aberdeen	2–1	Report / Report link; Kick off / 15:00 GMT; Attendance / 49,667; Referee / Willie Young (Scotland); Rangers / Aberdeen; 37' Mols; 77' Mols / 75' Tosh
33	8 February 2003	Scottish Premier League	27	A	Dunfermline Athletic	3–1	Report / Report link; Kick off / 12:30 GMT; Attendance / 8,754; Referee / Hugh Dallas (Scotland); Dunfermline Athletic / Rangers; 49' Brewster / 38' McCann; 71' Amoruso; 90' Caniggia
34	15 February 2003	Scottish Premier League	28	H	Heart of Midlothian	1–0	Report / Report link; Kick off / 15:00 GMT; Attendance / 49,459; Referee / John Underhill (Scotland); Rangers / Heart of Midlothian; 41' (o.g.) Severin
36	2 March 2003	Scottish Premier League	29	A	Livingston	2–1	Report / Report link; Kick off / 15:00 GMT; Attendance / 10,004; Referee / John Rowbotham (Scotland); Livingston / Rangers; 90' Dadi / 8' Amoruso; 16' Arveladze
37	8 March 2003	Scottish Premier League	30	A	Celtic	0–1	Report / Report link; Kick off / 12:30 GMT; Attendance / 58,787; Referee / Mike McCurry (Scotland); Celtic / Rangers; 58' Hartson
39	19 March 2003	Scottish Premier League	31	H	Motherwell	2–0	Report / Report link; Kick off / 19:45 GMT; Attendance / 49,420; Referee / Hugh Dallas (Scotland); Rangers / Motherwell; 18' Ferguson; 46' Løvenkrands
41	5 April 2003	Scottish Premier League	32	H	Partick Thistle	2–0	Report / Report link; Kick off / 15:00 BST; Attendance / 49,472; Referee / Kenny Clark (Scotland); Rangers / Partick Thistle; 70' Mols; 75' Mols
43	13 April 2003	Scottish Premier League	33	A	Dundee United	4–1	Report / Report link; Kick off / 15:00 BST; Attendance / 10,271; Referee / Dougie McDonald (Scotland); Dundee United / Rangers; 71' Dodds / 11' de Boer; 18' Arveladze; 45' de Boer; 69' Arveladze
45	27 April 2003	Scottish Premier League	34	H	Celtic	1–2	Report / Report link; Kick off / 12:30 BST; Attendance / 50,096; Referee / Hugh Dallas (Scotland); Rangers / Celtic; 57' de Boer / 29' (pen.) Thompson; 43' Hartson
46	4 May 2003	Scottish Premier League	35	A	Dundee	2–2	Report / Report link; Kick off / 15:00 BST; Attendance / 9,204; Referee / John Rowbotham (Scotland); Dundee / Rangers; 17' Caballero; 28' Caballero / 1' (o.g.) Wilkie; 85' (pen.) Arteta
47	11 May 2003	Scottish Premier League	36	H	Kilmarnock	4–0	Report / Report link; Kick off / 15:00 BST; Attendance / 49,036; Referee / Alan Freeland (Scotland); Rangers / Kilmarnock; 6' Mols; 7' Mols; 59' Arveladze; 80' Caniggia
48	18 May 2003	Scottish Premier League	37	A	Heart of Midlothian	2–0	Report / Report link; Kick off / 15:00 BST; Attendance / 15,632; Referee / Hugh Dallas (Scotland); Heart of Midlothian / Rangers; / 65' de Boer; 73' Løvenkrands
49	25 May 2003	Scottish Premier League	38	H	Dunfermline Athletic	6–1	Report / Report link; Kick off / 15:00 BST; Attendance / 49,731; Referee / Stuart Dougal (Scotland); Rangers / Dunfermline Athletic; 3' Mols; 16' Caniggia; 30' Arveladze; 64' de Boer; 67' Thompson; 90' (pen.) Arteta / 11' Dair

Last updated: 25 May 2003
Source: Wikipedia article
^{1}Rangers goals come first.
National flags for Ground and Opponent columns are only shown when different from that of Rangers.
M = Match; Ground: H = Home, A = Away, N = Neutral, HR = Home replacement, AR = Away replacement.

=== Scottish League Cup ===
Game	Date	Tournament	Round	Ground	Opponent	Score^{1}	Report
14	24 October 2002	League Cup	3	A	Hibernian	3–2	Report / Report link; Kick off / 19:45 GMT; Attendance / 8,016; Referee / Hugh Dallas (Scotland); Hibernian / Rangers; 6' Murray; 72' O'Connor; (yellow card) 87' (red card) Smith / 22' (o.g.) Townsley; 25' Caniggia; 78' Løvenkrands
17	7 November 2002	League Cup	QF	A	Dunfermline Athletic	1–0	Report / Report link; Kick off / 20:00 GMT; Attendance / 8,415; Referee / Dougie McDonald (Scotland); Dunfermline Athletic / Rangers; / 79' Caniggia
32	4 February 2003	League Cup	SF	N	Heart of Midlothian	1–0	Report / Report link; Kick off / 19:45 GMT; Attendance / 31,609; Referee / Mike McCurry (Scotland); Rangers / Heart of Midlothian; 27' de Boer
38	16 March 2003	League Cup	F	N	Celtic	2–1	Report / Report link; Kick off / 15:00 GMT; Attendance / 52,000; Referee / Kenny Clark (Scotland); Celtic / Rangers; 57' Larsson; (yellow card) 88' (red card) Lennon / 23' Caniggia; 35' Løvenkrands

Last updated: 16 March 2003
Source: Wikipedia article
^{1}Rangers goals come first.
National flags for Ground and Opponent columns are only shown when different from that of Rangers.
M = Match; Ground: H = Home, A = Away, N = Neutral, HR = Home replacement, AR = Away replacement.

=== Scottish Cup ===
Game	Date	Tournament	Round	Ground	Opponent	Score^{1}	Report
29	25 January 2003	Scottish Cup	3	A	Arbroath	3–0	Report / Report link; Kick off / 17:35 GMT; Attendance / 4,125; Referee / John Rowbotham (Scotland); Arbroath / Rangers; / 27' Ferguson; 32' Moore; 58' Arveladze
35	22 February 2003	Scottish Cup	4	A	Ayr United	1–0	Report / Report link; Kick off / 15:00 GMT; Attendance / 9,608; Referee / Alan Freeland (Scotland); Ayr United / Rangers; / 79' de Boer
40	23 March 2003	Scottish Cup	QF	A	Dunfermline Athletic	1–1	Report / Report link; Kick off / 15:00 GMT; Attendance / 9,875; Referee / John Underhill (Scotland); Rangers / Dunfermline Athletic; 31' Caniggia; (red card) 89' Ferguson / 23' Grondin
42	9 April 2003	Scottish Cup	QF R	H	Dunfermline Athletic	3–0	Report / Report link; Kick off / 19:45 BST; Attendance / 24,752; Referee / John Underhill (Scotland); Rangers / Dunfermline Athletic; 4' Løvenkrands; 19' Ferguson; 54' Arteta
44	19 April 2003	Scottish Cup	SF	N	Motherwell	4–3	Report / Report link; Kick off / 12:30 BST; Attendance / 29,352; Referee / Mike McCurry (Scotland); Rangers / Motherwell; 2' Konterman; 56' Mols; 60' Amoruso; 73' (o.g.) Partridge / 15' Craig; 27' McFadden; 90' Adams
50	31 May 2003	Scottish Cup	F	N	Dundee	1–0	Report / Report link; Kick off / 15:00 BST; Attendance / 47,136; Referee / Kenny Clark (Scotland); Dundee / Rangers; / 66' Amoruso

Last updated: 31 May 2003
Source: Wikipedia article
^{1}Rangers goals come first.
National flags for Ground and Opponent columns are only shown when different from that of Rangers.
M = Match; Ground: H = Home, A = Away, N = Neutral, HR = Home replacement, AR = Away replacement.

=== UEFA Cup ===
Game

Date

Tournament

Round

Ground

Opponent

Score^{1}

Report

8
17 September 2002
UEFA Cup
1
A
(Czech Republic) Viktoria Žižkov
0–2

Report	Report link
Kick off	16:30 BST
Attendance	3,427
Referee	Julian Rodriguez Santiago (Spain)
Viktoria Žižkov	Rangers
7' Pikl; 60' Stracený

11
3 October 2002
UEFA Cup
1
H
(Czech Republic) Viktoria Žižkov
3–1

Report	Report link
Kick off	19:45 BST
Attendance	47,646
Referee	Athanassios Briakos (Greece)
Rangers	Viktoria Žižkov
43' de Boer; 59' de Boer; 97' McCann	100' Licka; (yellow card) 118' (red card) Buryan

Last updated: 3 October 2002
Source: Wikipedia article
^{1}Rangers goals come first.
National flags for Ground and Opponent columns are only shown when different from that of Rangers.
M = Match; Ground: H = Home, A = Away, N = Neutral, HR = Home replacement, AR = Away replacement.

== Competitions ==
=== Overall ===
Competition	Started round	Final position / round	First match	Last match
Scottish Premier League	—	1st	3 August	25 May
UEFA Cup	1st Round	1st Round	17 September	3 October
Scottish League Cup	3rd Round	Winners	24 October	16 March
Scottish Cup	3rd Round	Winners	25 January	31 May

Source: Competitions

=== Scottish Premier League ===
==== Standings ====
Pos	Team	Pld	W	D	L	GF	GA	GD	Pts	Qualification or relegation (Note: Teams played each other three times (33 matches), before the league split into two groups (the top six and the bottom six) for the last five matches.)
1	Rangers (C)	38	31	4	3	101	28	+73	97	Qualification for the Champions League third qualifying round
2	Celtic	38	31	4	3	98	26	+72	97	Qualification for the Champions League second qualifying round
3	Heart of Midlothian	38	18	9	11	57	51	+6	63	Qualification for the UEFA Cup first round
4	Kilmarnock	38	16	9	13	47	56	−9	57	
5	Dunfermline Athletic	38	13	7	18	54	71	−17	46	

Source: Scottish Professional Football League
Rules for classification: 1) Points; 2) Goal difference; 3) Goals scored
(C) Champions

==== Results summary ====
Overall								Home						Away					
Pld	W	D	L	GF	GA	GD	Pts	W	D	L	GF	GA	GD	W	D	L	GF	GA	GD
38	31	4	3	101	28	+73	97	18	0	1	55	12	+43	13	4	2	46	16	+30

Last updated: 25 May 2003.
Source: Wikipedia article

==== Results by round ====
Round	1	2	3	4	5	6	7	8	9	10	11	12	13	14	15	16	17	18	19	20	21	22	23	24	25	26	27	28	29	30	31	32	33	34	35	36	37	38
Ground	A	H	A	H	A	H	A	H	A	A	H	H	A	H	A	H	A	H	H	H	A	A	A	H	A	H	A	H	A	A	H	H	A	H	A	H	A	H
Result	D	W	W	W	W	W	W	W	W	D	W	W	W	W	D	W	W	W	W	W	W	L	W	W	W	W	W	W	W	L	W	W	W	L	D	W	W	W

Updated to match(es) played on 25 May 2003. Source: 2002–03 Scottish Premier League
A = Away; H = Home; W = Win; D = Draw; L = Loss
