= 2001–02 Dundee F.C. season =

Dundee
2001–02 season
- Manager: Ivano Bonetti
- Stadium: Dens Park
- Scottish Premier League: 9th
- Scottish Cup: Fourth Round
- Scottish League Cup: Third Round
Home colours

The 2001–02 season saw Dundee compete in the Scottish Premier League where they finished in 9th position with 44 points.

== Final league table ==
| Pos | Team | Pld | W | D | L | GF | GA | GD | Pts | Qualification or relegation (Note: Teams played each other three times (33 matches), before the league split into two groups (the top six and the bottom six) for the last five matches.) |
|---|---|---|---|---|---|---|---|---|---|---|
| 7 | Kilmarnock | 38 | 13 | 10 | 15 | 44 | 54 | −10 | 49 | |
| 8 | Dundee United | 38 | 12 | 10 | 16 | 38 | 59 | −21 | 46 | |
| 9 | Dundee | 38 | 12 | 8 | 18 | 41 | 55 | −14 | 44 | |
| 10 | Hibernian | 38 | 10 | 11 | 17 | 51 | 56 | −5 | 41 | |
| 11 | Motherwell | 38 | 11 | 7 | 20 | 49 | 69 | −20 | 40 | |

Source: Scottish Professional Football League
Rules for classification: (1) Points; (2) Goal difference; (3) Goals scored

== Results ==
Dundee's score comes first

=== Legend ===
| Win | Draw | Loss |

=== Scottish Premier League ===
| Match | Date | Opponent | Venue | Result | Attendance | Scorers |
|---|---|---|---|---|---|---|
| 1 | 28 July 2001 | Dundee United | A | 2–2 | 13,327 | Sara 33', Rae 56' |
| 2 | 4 August 2001 | Hibernian | H | 2–1 | 9,447 | Sara 9', Caballero 62' |
| 3 | 11 August 2001 | Livingston | H | 1–0 | 7,712 | Sara 24' |
| 4 | 11 August 2001 | Heart of Midlothian | A | 1–3 | 12,259 | Nemsadze 86' |
| 5 | 26 August 2001 | Rangers | A | 0–2 | 48,038 | |
| 6 | 8 September 2001 | St Johnstone | H | 1–1 | 7,050 | Milne 3' |
| 7 | 15 September 2001 | Celtic | H | 0–4 | 9,842 | |
| 8 | 23 September 2001 | Kilmarnock | A | 1–0 | 7,052 | Rae 38' |
| 9 | 29 September 2001 | Aberdeen | H | 1–4 | 8,359 | Caballero 32' |
| 10 | 13 October 2001 | Dunfermline Athletic | A | 0–1 | 5,094 | |
| 11 | 27 October 2001 | Hibernian | A | 2–1 | 11,130 | Rae 19', Milne 90' |
| 12 | 30 October 2001 | Motherwell | H | 3–1 | 6,836 | Sara 32', Ketsbaia 55', Caballero 62' |
| 13 | 3 November 2001 | Dundee United | H | 1–1 | 11,751 | Carranza 41' |
| 14 | 3 November 2001 | Heart of Midlothian | A | 0–2 | 10,374 | |
| 15 | 3 November 2001 | Livingston | A | 0–1 | 6,112 | |
| 16 | 24 November 2001 | Heart of Midlothian | H | 1–1 | 7,219 | Mackay 80' |
| 17 | 1 December 2001 | Rangers | H | 0–0 | 11,085 | |
| 18 | 8 December 2001 | St Johnstone | A | 2–0 | 5,299 | Sara 20', Ketsbaia 54' |
| 19 | 15 December 2001 | Celtic | A | 1–3 | 57,198 | Fan 19' |
| 20 | 22 December 2001 | Kilmarnock | H | 1–2 | 6,342 | Rae 48' |
| 21 | 9 January 2002 | Motherwell | A | 2–4 | 3,537 | Sara 34', Kemas 90' |
| 22 | 12 January 2002 | Hibernian | H | 1–0 | 7,326 | Fan 66' |
| 23 | 19 January 2002 | Dundee United | A | 0–1 | 12,851 | |
| 24 | 29 January 2002 | Aberdeen | A | 0–0 | 10,127 | |
| 25 | 2 February 2002 | Rangers | A | 1–2 | 48,861 | Rae 71' |
| 26 | 9 February 2002 | St Johnstone | H | 1–0 | 6,344 | Torres 41' |
| 27 | 13 February 2002 | Dunfermline Athletic | H | 2–2 | 6,043 | Rae 4', Caballero 6' |
| 28 | 17 February 2002 | Celtic | H | 0–3 | 10,642 | |
| 29 | 2 March 2002 | Kilmarnock | A | 2–3 | 6,890 | Sara 45', Ketsbaia 54' |
| 30 | 9 March 2002 | Aberdeen | H | 2–3 | 8,250 | Sara 15', Ketsbaia 40' |
| 31 | 13 March 2002 | Livingston | H | 2–0 | 5,506 | Sara 57', 90' |
| 32 | 16 March 2002 | Motherwell | H | 2–0 | 5,785 | Ketsbaia 5', 26' |
| 33 | 23 March 2002 | Dunfermline Athletic | A | 0–2 | 7,299 | |
| 34 | 6 April 2002 | Kilmarnock | H | 2–0 | 5,579 | Sara 43', Milne 49' |
| 35 | 13 April 2002 | St Johnstone | A | 1–0 | 3,055 | Milne 80' |
| 36 | 20 April 2002 | Dundee United | H | 0–1 | 10,087 | |
| 37 | 27 April 2002 | Hibernian | A | 2–2 | 8,852 | Caballero 33', Milne 88' |
| 38 | 12 May 2002 | Motherwell | A | 1–2 | 6,574 | Caballero 66' |

=== Scottish Cup ===
| Match | Date | Opponent | Venue | Result | Attendance | Scorers |
|---|---|---|---|---|---|---|
| R3 | 6 January 2002 | Falkirk | H | 1–1 | 5,517 | Milne 82' |
| R3 Replay | 16 January 2002 | Falkirk | A | 1–0 | 4,739 | Fan 11' |
| R4 | 26 January 2002 | Partick Thistle | A | 1–1 | 7,025 | Torres 53' |
| R4 Replay | 6 February 2002 | Partick Thistle | H | 1–2 | 5,913 | Sara 53' |

=== Scottish League Cup ===
| Match | Date | Opponent | Venue | Result | Attendance | Scorers |
|---|---|---|---|---|---|---|
| R2 | 26 September 2001 | Hamilton Academical | A | 2–0 | 2,104 | Milne 66', Boylan 79' |
| R3 | 9 October 2001 | Ross County | A | 1–2 | 3,250 | Caballero 55' |

=== UEFA Intertoto Cup ===
| Match | Date | Opponent | Venue | Result | Attendance | Scorers |
|---|---|---|---|---|---|---|
| R1 1st leg | 16 June 2001 | Sartid Smederevo | H | 0–0 | 6,511 | |
| R1 2nd leg | 23 June 2001 | Sartid Smederevo | A | 2–5 | 10,000 | Caballero 5', Sara 60' |
