= Steven Thompson (Scottish footballer) =

Scottish footballer (born 1978)

Personal information
- Full name: Steven Howard Thompson
- Date of birth: 14 October 1978 (age 48)
- Place of birth: Paisley, Scotland
- Height: 1.88 m (6 ft 2 in)
- Position: Striker

Senior career*
Years	Team	Apps	(Gls)
1996–2003	Dundee United	133	(18)
2003–2006	Rangers	62	(17)
2006–2008	Cardiff City	97	(16)
2008–2011	Burnley	83	(13)
2011–2016	St Mirren	154	(44)
Total		529	(108)

International career
1997–1999	Scotland U21	12	(5)
2002–2004	Scotland	16	(3)
- * Club domestic league appearances and goals

Steven Howard Thompson (born 14 October 1978) is a Scottish former professional footballer, and current television pundit who played for Dundee United, Rangers, Cardiff City, Burnley and St Mirren. He was also a Scotland international between 2002 and 2016

== Club career ==
=== Dundee United ===
Born and raised in Paisley, Thompson started his football career at boys clubs Gleniffer Thistle and Renfrew Waverly. He then joined Dundee United at thirteen years old and waited to join full time at seventeen years old. Thompson was then promoted to the first team by manager Tommy McLean. He made his début as a substitute in a league match against Hearts on 3 May 1997. With the Tangerines, Thompson won the SFL Youth League at the end of the 1996–97 season.

Thompson scored on his first appearance of the 1997–98 season, in the return leg of the UEFA Cup against CE Principat, winning 9–0 and saw Dundee United through to the next round. A week later, on 9 August 1997, he scored again, in a 4–2 win against Queen of the South. Following this, Thompson made three more starts for the Tangerines by the end of August. He spent most of the 1997–98 season out of the first team due to manager McLean. Despite this, Thompson went on to make twelve appearances and scoring two times in all competitions.

By the 1998–1999 season, Thompson had become a regular in the Dundee United team despite facing competitions from Kjell Olofsson and Roger Boli. However, in a match against Hearts, on 16 August 1998, he came on as a 76th-minute substitute for Boli, but was sent–off thirteen minutes later for a foul on Gary Locke, as the match ended in a 0–0 draw. After serving a one match suspension, Thompson returned to the first team, coming on as a 64th-minute substitute, in a 2–1 loss against Celtic on 22 August 1998. However, he found himself out of the first team, due to his fitness concerns. However, in a fourth round replay of the Scottish Cup match against Queen's Park, Thompson suffered ankle injury and was substituted at the 89th minute, as the Tangerines won 1–0. On 6 March 1999, he returned from his injury, coming on as a 85th-minute substitute, in a 3–0 win against Clydebank in the fourth round replay of the Scottish Cup. Despite this, Thompson was able to score his first league goal for Dundee United, in a 3–1 win against local rivals, Dundee on 2 January 1999. At the end of the 1998–99 season, he made nineteen appearances and scoring once in all competitions.

In the 1999–00 season, Thompson continued to receive more playing time in the striker position at Dundee United and improved his "general play". On 18 August 1999, he scored a brace, in a 3–1 win against Ross County in the second round of the Scottish League Cup. Thompson then scored his third goal of the season, in a 2–0 win against local rivals, Dundee on 17 October 1999. However, he suffered a knee injury that saw him out for three matches. But Thompson made his return from his injury, starting the whole game, in a 1–1 draw against Kilmarnock on 20 November 1999. On 1 December 1999, he scored his fourth goal of the season, in a 3–2 win against Motherwell. His performance attracted interests from Premiership side Arsenal but manager Paul Sturrock dismissed the move. On 10 January 2000, Thompson signed a three–year contract with the Tangerines. On 23 February 2000, he scored another brace, in a 4–0 win against Alloa Athletic in the last 16 replay of the Scottish Cup. However, Thompson was soon out on three separate occasions in the second half of the season, due to injuries. At the end of the 1999–00 season, he made thirty–four appearances and scoring six times in all competitions.

At the start of the 2000–01 season, however, Thompson suffered a hamstring injury during Dundee United's pre–season tour. But he quickly recovered and returned to the starting line–up, in a 2–0 win against Forfar Athletic on 21 July 2000. Despite being a first team regular, Thompson suffered a goal drought that saw him struggle to score most of the 2000–01 season. He also faced his own injury concerns along the way. On 31 March 2001, Thompson scored his first goal of the season, in a 2–0 win against Rangers. He then scored three more goals for the Tangerines against Hearts, St Mirren and Dunfermline Athletic. At the end of the 2000–01 season, Thompson made thirty–seven appearances and scoring four times in all competitions.

However, at the start of the 2001–02 season, Thompson suffered a knee injury and was out for two matches. He made his return from his injury, coming on as a 77th-minute substitute, in a 2–0 loss against Livingston on 8 September 2001. Thompson scored on 25 September 2001, 29 September 2001 and 9 October 2001 against Dumbarton, Hearts and St Johnstone respectively. Following his return, he found himself alternating between the starting line–up and the substitute bench. On 22 December 2001, Thompson scored a brace, in a 3–2 loss against Rangers. He then scored another brace, in a 4–0 win against Hamilton Academical in the fourth round of the Scottish Cup. Thompson later scored three more goals for Dundee United in the league, coming against Hibernian, Motherwell and Kilmarnock. At the end of the 2001–02 season, he made thirty–seven appearances and scoring ten times in all competitions.

At the start of the 2002–03 season, Thompson scored his first goal of the season, in a 2–1 loss against Kilmarnock on 10 August 2002. He continued to be a first team regular for Dundee United in the first half of the season. Thompson scored a brace, in a 2–1 win against Aberdeen on 11 September 2002. Two weeks later, on 24 September 2002, he scored his fourth goal of the season, in a 4–1 win against Queen's Park. On 5 October 2002, he scored his fifth goal of the season, in a 2–1 loss against Hibernian. Thompson then scored on 26 October 2002, 29 October 2002 and 2 November 2002 against Partick Thistle, Airdrieonians (twice) and Kilmarnock respectively. During the same month, he began talks with the Tangerines over a new contract, insisting a week later they were "going well". Amidst speculation that Rangers were interested in signing Thompson, talks resumed in mid-November, only for the move to Rangers to all but be confirmed before the end of the month. Following talks on a new contract broken down, it announced that Dundee United had placed Thompson on a transfer list. By the time he left the Tangerines, Thompson made twenty–three appearances and scoring nine all competitions.

=== Rangers ===
On Boxing Day 2002, Thompson moved to Rangers for £200,000 with Billy Dodds having returned to Tannadice twenty-four hours earlier, though Sky Sports reported the move was completed on 31 December 2002.

Thompson scored on his debut for the club, in the 3–1 win over Dundee on 2 January 2003. However, he found himself out of the starting line–up since joining Rangers, due to competitions in the striker position. On the last game of the 2002–03 season, Thompson scored his second goal for the club, in a 6–1 win against Dunfermline Athletic to win the league. Six days later, on 31 May 2003, he came on as a 56th-minute substitute, and helped Rangers win the Scottish Cup final by beating Dundee 1–0, achieving a domestic treble. At the end of the 2002–03 season, Thompson made eleven appearances and scoring two times in all competitions.

At the start of the 2003–04 season, Thompson said he’s aiming to improve as a player despite being given a nickname of the "Ghost of Hateley" by Scottish newspapers. Thompson played in both legs of the third qualifying round of the UEFA Champions League against Copenhagen and helped Rangers win 3–2 on aggregate to advance to the group stage. However, during a match against Aberdeen on 16 August 2003, he suffered an injury and was substituted in the 56th minute, as the club won 3–2. After missing one match, Thompson returned to the first team, coming on as a 50th-minute substitute, against his former club, Dundee United, on 31 August 2003 and set up one of the goals, in a 3–1 win. In a follow–up match against Dunfermline Athletic, he scored his first goal of the season, in a 4–0 win. During the match, however, Thompson suffered a knee ligament damage and was substituted in the 18th minute. After undergoing a successful surgery, it was expected that he would be out for six months. By February, Thompson made a full recovery from his injury. On 21 February 2004, he made his return from his injury, coming on as a 69th-minute substitute, and scored the third goal of the game, from a penalty, in a 3–0 win against Hibernian. After missing one match, Thompson scored on his return, in a 4–0 win against Dundee on 20 March 2004. A week later, on 28 March 2004, he scored a late consolation, a 2–1 loss against rival against Celtic. He scored on 17 April 2004, 24 April 2003 and 1 May 2004 against Partick Thistle, Dundee United (twice) and Motherwell respectively. Following his return from his injury, Thompson was involved in the first team for the remainder of the season. At the end of the 2003–04 season, he made nineteen appearances and scoring eight times in all competitions.

Thompson made his first appearance of the 2004–05 season, coming on as a 83rd-minute substitute, in a 2–1 loss against CSKA Moscow in the first leg of the UEFA Champions League third qualifying round. In the return leg, he scored the equalising goal, as Rangers drew 1–1 and was eliminated from the tournament. Throughout the 2004–05 season, Thompson found himself alternating between the starting line–up and substitute bench. On 22 September 2004, he scored his second goal of the season, in a 2–0 win against Aberdeen in the third round of the Scottish League Cup. In a return leg of the UEFA Cup first round against Marítimo, Thompson played 120 minutes, leading to penalty shootout following a 1–1 draw on aggregate and successfully converted his penalty, as the club won 4–2 and advanced to the next round. He scored his first European goal, scoring the fifth goal of the game, in a 5–0 win against Amica Wronki in a UEFA Cup match. Thompson scored on 31 October 2004 and 7 November 2004 against Aberdeen and Livingstone respectively. However, during a match against Celtic in the quarter–finals of the Scottish League Cup, he suffered ankle injury and was substituted in the 27th minute, as Rangers won 2–1 to advance to the next round. After being out for a month, Thompson returned from his injury, coming on as a 69th-minute substitute, in a 1–0 win against Kilmarnock on 19 December 2004. In a follow–up match against Motherwell, he scored his sixth goal of the season, in a 4–1 win against Motherwell. Two weeks later, on 15 January 2005, Thompson scored his seventh goal of the season, in a 3–0 win against Dunfermline Athletic. In the Scottish League Cup final, he came on as a 84th-minute substitute, and helped the club win 5–1 against Motherwell. On 24 April 2005, Thompson scored a late consolation, in a 2–1 loss against Celtic. On the last game of the season, he appeared as an unused substitute, as Rangers beat Hibernian 1–0 to win the league. At the end of the 2004–05 season, he went on to make thirty–three appearances and scoring ten times in all competitions.

At the start of the 2005–06 season, Thompson played in both legs of the first leg of the UEFA Champions League third qualifying round, coming on as a substitute, in a 3–1 win on aggregate against Anorthosis Famagusta to advance to the group stage. Throughout the first half of the season, he continued find his playing time, coming from the substitute bench, due to the form of Dado Pršo. Thompson received his first starts of the season against Hibernian on 27 August 2005 and was at faults for missing several opportunities at half–time, as Rangers loss 3–0. However, he received an Achilles injury that saw him out for a month. Thompson returned on 22 October 2005 from his injury, coming on as a 77th-minute substitute, in a 2–0 win against Motherwell. He then scored on 29 October 2005 and 1 November 2005 against Inverness Caledonian Thistle and Petržalka 1898 (also scoring first UEFA Champions League goal) respectively. Thompson's goals were usually accompanied by what appeared to be extreme anger as he vented to all and sundry. On 31 December 2005, Thompson scored his last goal for the club, in a 3–0 loss against his former club, Rangers. By the time he left Rangers, Thompson made twenty–two appearances and scoring three times in all competitions.

With his contract expiring at the end of the 2005–06 season, it was expected that Thompson could be leaving Rangers in the January transfer window. Among interested in signing him was Scottish Premier League rivals, Aberdeen. Initially, manager Alex McLeish refused to sell Thompson until Pršo was fit. After leaving Rangers, he had no regrets of joining the club and said the achievements of winning trophies was "phenomenal". However, Thompson stated: "There was no blow to my pride in leaving because when I was there I achieved everything I wanted to achieve, and I have incredible memories from my time there. It was an experience to be part of such a massive club and I think perhaps down here people don't realise how big a club it is. But that is in the past. I was delighted to be part of it, but the thing is you can't sit at 26 or 27 years of age and not be getting regular first-team football, and I had to make that decision."

=== Cardiff City ===
But on 10 January 2006, Thompson was allowed to move to Coca–Cola Championship side Cardiff City for a fee of £250,000. Upon joining the club, he was given a number nine shirt.

Thompson debut for CardIff City, starting the whole game, and scored twice, in a 3–0 win over Burnley on 14 January 2006. After the match, manager Dave Jones praised his performance. However, Thompson suffered a bizarre injury after he cut himself badly while slicing an apple at home and had micro-surgery to re-attach nerves and missed two matches as a result. He made his return from his injury, starting the whole game, in a 1–0 win against Hull City on 18 February 2006. Thompson then regained his first team place for the rest of the 2005–06 season, forming a striking partnership with Cameron Jerome. He scored the only goal of the game, in a 1–0 win against Plymouth Argyle on 18 March 2006. After missing one match, due to a hamstring injury, Thompson returned to the starting line–up, in a 5–2 loss against Reading on 8 April 2006. On the last game of the season, he scored his fourth goal of the season, in a 3–1 win against Coventry City. At the end of the 2005–06 season, Thompson made fourteen appearances and scoring four times in all competitions.

In the opening game of the 2006–07 season, Thompson scored Cardiff City’s second goal of the game, in a 2–1 win against Barnsley. At the start of the 2006–07 season, he continued to be a regular first team member, forming a partnership with fellow striker Michael Chopra. On 12 September 2006, Thompson scored the opening goal of the game, in a 3–3 draw against Plymouth Argyle. A month later, on 17 October 2006, he scored the only goal of the game, in a 1–0 win against Southampton. However, in a match against Sunderland on 31 October 2006, Thompson suffered a damaged Achilles tendon and was substituted at half–time, as the club won 2–1.

After missing two matches, he returned to the starting line–up, in a 1–0 loss against Queens Park Rangers on 17 November 2006. However, since returning from his injury, Thompson began struggling to score goals for Cardiff City, which he came under criticism by the Welsh media and the club’s supporters. On 26 December 2006, Thompson ended his goal drought when he scored twice, in a 2–2 draw against Plymouth Argyle. After missing one match, due to a fitness concern, he returned to the starting line–up and played 62 minutes before being substituted, in a 2–1 win against Wolverhampton Wanderers on 20 January 2007.

In a follow–up match against Leicester City, Thompson set up a goal for Chopra, who scored a hat–trick, as Cardiff City went on to win 3–2. After the match, Chopra praised Thompson’s performance and felt his assist contributed to him scoring a hat–trick. On 13 March 2007, he scored his sixth goal of the season, in a 2–2 draw against Southampton. At the end of the 2006–07 season, Thompson played a total of 44 matches in both league and cup competitions during his first year but he only managed to find the net 6 times. Thompson made forty–five appearances and scoring six times in all competitions. Due to his inability to score goals consistently at Championship level, Thompson was transfer listed in the summer transfer window of 2007 and was told to leave the club.

However, ahead of the 2007–08 season, Thompson suffered a bizarre injury on holiday in the United States when he fell off a banana boat, being towed behind another boat, which caused him to sustain a groin injury that required surgery. This prevented him from leaving Cardiff City in the summer transfer window of 2007. He returned from the injury on 15 September 2007, coming off the bench to grab a late equaliser in a league match against Plymouth Argyle. Following his return from his injury, Thompson found his playing time, coming off the bench for two months, for the club. However, despite his increasing form, he was not formally taken off the transfer list by manager and attracted interest from Scottish Premier League side Aberdeen. During November and the beginning of December, Thompson was first choice striker for Cardiff City and normally lined up alongside Jimmy Floyd Hasselbaink in the squad. He found the net three times during this period, against Hull City, Colchester United and Blackpool. After these matches, Thompson held an interview with Scottish newspaper The Herald in which he claimed that manager Dave Jones had made him a scapegoat for Cardiff's failure to reach the play-offs the previous year. During the interview, he also revealed that he and Jones rarely speak to each other anymore after he was placed on the transfer list. A day later on 15 December 2007, Thompson was sent off in a derby match against Bristol City after a foul on Bristol goalkeeper Adriano Basso by referee Uriah Rennie, who was heavily criticised by Dave Jones for his handling of the game. While serving a three match suspension, he was fined for a two weeks wages as a result of the interview. After serving a three match suspension, Thompson returned to the first team, coming on as a 61st-minute substitute, in a 1–0 win against Plymouth Argyle on 1 January 2008. On 14 January 2008, Cardiff manager Dave Jones revealed that the club had received two offers for Thompson from another Football League Championship club, but they had been turned down. Three days later, on 17 January 2008, he announced his intention to stay at the club for the rest of the 2007–08 season. On 27 January 2008, Thompson scored a penalty, in a 2–1 win against Hereford United in the fourth round of the FA Cup. Although Thompson found his playing time from the substitute bench following his return from suspension, he managed to earn his place back in the starting eleven towards the end of the 2007–08 season. In the semi–finals of the FAW Premier Cup against Newport County, Thompson scored the equalising goal at extra time, leading to penalty shoot–out, following a 1–1 draw and he was one of the two Cardiff City players to miss the shootout, resulting in the club’s elimination from the tournament. During a 0–0 draw against West Bromwich Albion on 1 April 2008, Thompson suffered a hamstring injury and was substituted at half–time. But he recovered and returned to the first team, coming on as a 61st-minute substitute, in a 1–0 win against Barnsley in the semi–finals, a win that saw Cardiff City reach their first Final since 1927. On 26 April 2008, Thompson scored his sixth goal of the season, in a 3–3 draw against Burnley. Up until then, he continued to receive criticisms from the club’s supporters for his goal drought. In the final against Portsmouth, Thompson came on as a 70th-minute substitute, and played for the rest of the match as Cardiff City loss 1–0. At the end of the 2007–08 season, he made forty–three appearances and scoring seven times in all competitions.

Ahead of the 2008–09 season, Thompson remained on the transfer list for Cardiff City. Amid to his future at the club, he scored his first goal of the season, in a 2–1 win over Southampton on the opening game of the season. By the time Thompson left Cardiff City, he made five appearances and scoring once for the club in all competitions.

=== Burnley ===
On 1 September 2008, after spending over a year on the transfer list at Cardiff, Thompson signed for Burnley on a two-year deal. Upon joining the Clarets, he linked up with manager Owen Coyle again, during Coyle's time at Dundee United Thompson used to clean his football boots.

Thompson made his Burnley debut on 13 September 2008, starting the match and played 67 minutes before being substituted, in a 2–1 win against Nottingham Forest. Since joining the club, he quickly becoming a first team regular, playing in the striker position and formed a partnership with Martin Paterson. On 24 October 2008, Thompson scored his first goal for Burnley, in a 1–1 draw against Charlton Athletic. However, in a match against Doncaster Rovers on 22 November 2008, he received a red card for a second bookable offence, as the club drew 0–0. After serving a one match suspension, Thompson returned to the first team, coming on as a 81st-minute substitute, in a 3–0 win against Derby County on 29 November 2008. He added two more goals for Burnley by the end of the year, coming against his former club, Cardiff City and Bristol City. Thompson scored his fourth goal of the season, in a 2–1 win against Queens Park Rangers in the third round replay of the FA Cup. He scored on 31 January 2009 and 3 February 2009 against Charlton Athletic and West Bromwich Albion respectively. A month later, on 11 March 2009, Thompson scored his tenth goal of the season and set up two goals, in a 4–2 win against Crystal Palace. After the match, he believed that the club can reach the Championship play–offs. However, in a follow–up match against Nottingham Forest, Thompson suffered ankle injury after a challenge from Wes Morgan in the 8th minute and was substituted, as Burnley won 5–0. After the match, he was out for almost two months. On the last game of the season against Bristol City, Thompson returned from his injury, coming on as a 77th-minute substitute, in a 4–0 win. He scored a 20-yard volley on 12 May in the 2–0 win over Reading in the second leg of the Championship play-off semi-final. Just prior to the play-off final, manager Coyle praised Thompson’s performance, calling him "the best free transfer of the season". In the final against Sheffield United, he started the match and played 77 minutes before being substituted, as the club won 1–0 to earn promotion to the Premier League. At the end of the 2008–09 season, Thompson went on to make over 40 appearances for the side and scoring a career high total of 11 goals.

In the 2009–10 season, with Burnley now in the Premier League for the first time in 33 years, Thompson made his Premier League debut, coming on as 82nd-minute substitute, in a 2–0 loss against Stoke City. However, Thompson's opportunities were mainly limited to cameo roles, due to competitions in the striker positions and had to play for the club’s reserve matches, where he scored three goals. Following Coyle's departure to rival Bolton and was replaced by Brian Laws, he made his first Premier League start, in a 1–1 draw against Stoke City on 10 March 2010. In a follow–up match, Thompson scored his first Premier League goal for Burnley in a 2–1 defeat by Wolves on 13 March 2010. After the match, he called on the club’s supporters to get behind the Clarets in effort to fight for their Premier League survival. Thompson scored his second goal of the season, in a 2–1 loss against Sunderland on 17 April 2010. However, in a follow–up match against Liverpool, he came on as a 77th-minute substitute, as Burnley loss 4–0 and was relegated back to the Championship. Thompson scored on 1 May 2010 and 9 May 2010 in the remaining matches of the 2009–10 season against Birmingham City and Tottenham Hotspur respectively. At the end of the 2009–10 season, he made twenty–three appearances and scoring four times in all competitions. Following this, Thompson signed a new one-year contract by the club after he was one of the players to be offered a new deal.

In the 2010–11 season, with Burnley back in the Championship after one season in the Premier League, Thompson, again, saw his first team opportunities limited and found his playing time from the substitute bench, due to competitions. On 24 August 2010, he scored his first goal of the season, and set up one of the goals, in a 3–1 win against Morecambe in the second round of the League Cup. On 1 January 2011, Thompson scored his second goal of the season, in a 4–2 win against Sheffield United. Despite not featured under manager Laws, he determined to stay at the club and fight his way to the starting eleven. On 15 February 2011, Thompson scored an equalising goal against his former club, Cardiff City, in a 1–1 draw. After the match, he said: "It's important we kept up our momentum, going into these two big matches at Watford and Cardiff, and taking four out of six points is a good return, on the back of our win against Norwich City before that. We're building momentum and looking forward. This is the first time certainly I've felt we're really picking up a bit of speed here." However, Thompson suffered a groin injury and was out for a month. But on 9 April 2011, he recovered and returned from his injury, coming on as a 73rd-minute substitute, in a 4–0 loss against Leicester City. At the end of the 2010–11 season, Thompson made thirty–five appearances and scoring three times in all competitions.

Following this, Thompson was released by Burnley, ending his three years association with the club. Following his release, he said his intention to return to Scotland. With his intention of returning to Scotland for the first time since leaving Rangers for Cardiff City, he spoke fondly about his time at Burnley, helping the Clarets promoted to the Premier League.

=== St Mirren ===
Thompson signed a two-year deal with boyhood heroes St Mirren on 1 June 2011. Upon joining the club, he said the main objective was to aim for a top–six finish in the Scottish Premier League. Thompson was also a favourite to become St Mirren’s captain before it went to Jim Goodwin.

He made his debut for the club in a friendly match against Dumbarton, in a 2–0 win on 12 July 2011. In a follow–up friendly match against Greenock Morton in the Renfrewshire Cup match, Thompson scored twice on his home debut at St Mirren Park, in a 4–2 win. However, in the opening game of the season, against Dunfermline Athletic, he won a penalty for St Mirren, only for him to miss the penalty kick, in a 0–0 draw. After the match, manager Danny Lennon maintained his confidence in Thompson remaining as a penalty kicker. On 6 August 2011, he scored his first goal for the club, in a 1–1 draw against former club, Dundee United. Three weeks later, on 23 August 2011, Thompson, once again, scored twice against Greenock Morton, in a 4–3 win in the second round of Scottish League Cup. Since joining the club, he quickly became a first team regular, partnering in a forward position with Nigel Hasselbaink, Dougie Imrie and Paul McGowan. On 15 October 2011, Thompson scored his second goal for St Mirren, in a 1–1 draw against his former club, Rangers. After the match, he said scoring against his former side at the Ibrox Stadium was "brilliant" and a "great feeling" to equalise. Thompson then scored two more goals by the end of 2011, coming against Inverness Caledonian Thistle and Dundee United. Despite initially suffering from a calf injury prior to the match against Aberdeen on 10 December 2011, he recovered to start the match and set up two goals for the club to go from 2–0 down to a 2–2 draw After missing one match due to injury, Thompson scored on his return, in a 5–2 loss against Hearts on 14 January 2012. A month later, on 4 February 2012, he scored an equalising goal, in a 1–1 draw against Ross County in the last 16 of the Scottish Cup to earn a replay match. In a replay match, however, Thompson received a straight red card in the 37th minute for elbowing Johnny Flynn’s face, as St Mirren won 2–1 to advance to the next round. After serving a two match suspension, he returned to the starting line–up, in a 0–0 draw against Hibernian on 3 March 2012. After overcoming a thigh injury, Thompson ended his two months goal drought two weeks later, on 24 March 2012, scoring in a 1–1 draw against Dunfermline Athletic. This was followed up by scoring twice, in a 4–2 win against Kilmarnock. He captained the club for the first time in his career against former club, Rangers on 7 April 2012, and set up St. Mirren’s only goal of the game, in a 3–1 loss. Two weeks later, on 21 April 2012, Thompson scored his first hat-trick for St Mirren, in a 4–4 draw against Dunfermline Athletic, taking his tally for the season to 15. After the match, he spoke about his delight of scoring a hat–trick, having done it over a decade ago. On 2 May 2012, Thompson scored his sixteenth goal of the season, in a 2–0 win against Kilmarnock. After the match, manager Lennon praised his performance, calling him the club’s “main man” for his scoring form. At the end of the 2011–12 season, he made forty–four appearances and scoring sixteen times in all competitions.

Having missed the opening game of the 2012–13 season, due to suspension, Thompson made his first appearance of the season, in a 2–0 win against Dundee on 11 August 2012. Since returning from suspension, he continued to remain St Mirren’s first choice striker, partnering with Imrie, McGowan, Sam Parkin, Lewis Guy and Esmaël Gonçalves. Thompson scored two goals throughout August, coming against Hibernian and Ayr United. A month later against Ross County on 29 September 2012, he scored a brace, including an overhead kick and won a penalty, allowing Lewis Guy to score, in a 5–4 thrilling victory for the club. On 10 November 2012, Thompson scored his fifth goal of the season, in a 4–1 loss against Aberdeen. Two weeks later, on 24 November 2012, Thompson scored a brace, in a 3–1 win against Dundee. After missing one match due to a rib injury, he then scored on 21 December 2012, 26 December 2012 and 30 December 2012 against Motherwell (twice), Inverness Caledonian Thistle and St Mirren respectively. Thompson, once again, scored on 19 January 2013, 27 January 2013 and 30 January 2013 against Ross County, Celtic (a win that send St Mirren through to the Scottish League Cup final) and Inverness Caledonian Thistle respectively. After the match against Celtic, national newspaper The Herald praised his performance, saying: "he worked tirelessly and was rewarded with the goal that effectively put the tie beyond the Hoops." For his performance, Thompson agreed a new one-year contract with the club. In the Scottish League Cup final against Hearts, he scored St Mirren’s second goal of the game, as the Paisley team won 3–2 to win the tournament for the first time ever. After the match, Thompson described winning the Scottish League Cup for the club as "bursting with pride" and amazing feeling. Local newspaper Paisley Daily Express described Thompson "as the King of Paisley", while the Herald said: "he was isolated up front and frustrated early on but played the crucial pass for the equaliser before his first-time finish put Saints in front. More of a threat after St Mirren moved to 4-4-2." A month later, on 20 April 2013, Thompson scored his sixteenth goal of the season, in a 2–1 loss against Dundee. At the end of the 2012–13 season, he made forty–one appearances and scoring sixteen times in all competitions. Reflecting on his second season at the club, Thompson said: "For St Mirren fans the season will be remembered for one thing and only: the Scottish League Cup win."

At the start of the 2013–14 season, Thompson continued to remain St Mirren’s first choice striker, partnering with Gary Harkins, McGowan and Josh Magennis. At times throughout the season, he played as a lone striker. On 27 August 2013, Thompson scored his first goal of the season, in a 2–1 loss against Queen of the South in the second round of the Scottish League Cup. A month later, on 30 September 2013, he scored his second goal of the season, in a 1–1 draw against Aberdeen. In a match against St Johnstone on 19 October 2013, Thompson scored the winning goal for the club, in a 4–3 win. He scored on 9 November 2013 and 17 November 2013 against Partick Thistle (twice) and Ross County. In the fourth round of the Scottish Cup match against Queen of the South, Thompson scored St Mirren’s second goal of the game, in a 2–2 draw to earn a replay. On 7 December 2013, he made his 100th appearance for the club, in a 0–0 draw against Inverness Caledonian Thistle. Three days later, on 10 December 2013, Thompson scored his eighth goal of the season, in a 3–0 win against Queen of the South in the fourth round replay of the Scottish Cup to advance to the next round. He, once again, scored 26 December 2013 and 29 December 2013 against his former club, Dundee United (twice) and Hearts. Thompson then added two more goals throughout January, coming against Hibernian and Hearts. On 15 March 2014, he scored his fourteenth goal of the season, in a 3–2 loss against Dundee United. In a match against Motherwell on 5 April 2014, Thompson scored twice for St Mirren, in a 3–2 win to help the club stay in the Scottish Premiership for another season and relegated Hearts to the Scottish Championship. At the end of the 2013–14 season, with St Mirren finishing in eighth place, he made forty–one appearances and scoring sixteen times in all competitions, finishing the season on high, becoming the club's top-scorer.

Ahead of the 2014–15 season, Thompson was named as a new captain of St Mirren by new manager Tommy Craig. It came after when he replaced Jim Goodwin in the role when he took up a new player-coach role under Craig. Upon becoming the club’s captain, Thompson said being captain was an honor and it made him proud. He also intended to finish his career at St Mirren. However, Thompson suffered a groin injury during the club’s pre–season tour and missed the first two league matches of the season. On 23 August 2014, he made his first appearance of the season, coming on as a 63rd-minute substitute, in a 1–0 loss against Dundee. Thompson made his first start of the season as captain against Dunfermline Athletic in the second round of the Scottish League Cup, only for him to be substituted at half–time, as St Mirren went on to win 2–1. After the match, he was out for four months. Thompson returned on 6 December 2014 from his injury, starting the match, in a 1–0 loss against St Johnstone. However, his return was short–lived when he received a straight red card in the 19th minute for a foul on Mark O’Brien, as the club loss 1–0 against Motherwell on 20 December 2014. After serving a two match suspension, Thompson made return to the starting line–up, in a 1–0 loss against Inverness Caledonian Thistle on 4 January 2015. However, his return was short–lived once again when he suffered a hernia injury and was out for between three or four weeks. Thompson returned on 31 January 2015 from his injury, starting the match, in a 1–0 win against Partick Thistle. He then scored his first goal of the season, in a 1–0 win against Hamilton Academical on 28 February 2015. Following this, Thompson spent the rest of the season as the St Mirren’s captain. On 25 April 2015, he scored twice for the club, in a 4–1 win against Kilmarnock to keep their league status alive. Following St Mirren’s confirmation of their relegation the day before the match against Ross County, Thompson scored the winning goal from a penalty spot, in a 2–1 win. At the end of the 2014–15 season, he made twenty–three appearances and scoring three times in all competitions. Following this, Thompson signed a new one-year deal with the club on 26 June 2015.

At the start of the 2015–16 season, Thompson scored his first goal of the season, in a 3–1 win against Berwick Rangers in the first round of the Scottish League Cup. After the match, he said he was fit and resume his captaincy role to lead the club’s challenge in the Scottish Championship. However, in the opening game of the season against former club, Rangers, Thompson missed the penalty, leading to Cameron Howieson scoring a rebound, in a 3–1 loss. After the match, manager Ian Murray revealed that he taken off Thompson as a penalty taker. On 5 September 2015, he scored his second goal (and his last professional goal of his career), in a 2–0 win against Queen of the South. Having started off in the first team as captain, Thompson, however, soon lost his first team place, with Lawrence Shankland and Calum Gallagher was replaced as captain by Andy Webster. In April 2016, he announced his retirement from professional football at the end of the 2015–16 season. Thompson played his last professional football career, against his former club, Rangers, on the last game of the season, and played the remaining 15 minutes of the match, in a 2–2 draw. At the end of the 2015–16 season, he made thirty–four appearances and scoring two times in all competitions.

== Post-playing career ==
Following the sacking of Tommy Craig in December 2014, Thompson was named as a favourites by bookmakers to become the next St Mirren manager. He acknowledged the difficulty to turn a down a role of becoming the Saints manager if owner Stewart Gilmour offered it to him. Eventually, teammate Gary Teale was appointed as the new manager of St Mirren. In September 2016, Thompson, once again, ruled out to become a manager of St Mirren.

Following the end of his professional football career, Thompson said he would pursue a career as a media pundit. In November 2016, Thompson became a columnist for Scottish newspaper The Herald. He also became pundit and commentator for Sportscene. In July 2020, Thompson was announced as a presenter for Sportscene.

On 20 September 2017, Thompson was inducted into the St Mirren’s Hall of Fame.

== International career ==
=== Youth career ===
Having represented the under-19 level, Thompson was called up to the Scotland U19 squad for the 1997 Toulon Tournament. He played two times in the tournament, as Scotland U19 were eliminated in the group stage. Three months later, on 5 September 1997, Thompson made his debut for the Scotland U21, in a 3–0 loss against Belarus U21.

In April 1999, Thompson was called up to the Scotland U21 squad for the first time in almost two years. He scored his first goal for the under–21 side, in a 2–1 loss against Germany U21 on 27 April 1999. In a follow–up match, Thompson scored the winning goal, in a 1–0 win against Republic of Ireland U21. Three months later, on 4 September 1999, he scored a brace, in a 5–2 win against Bosnia and Herzegovina U21. In a follow–up match, Thompson scored in a 4–0 win against Estonia U21. Following this, he played his last appearance for Scotland U21, in a 2–0 win against Bosnia and Herzegovina U21 on 5 October 1999.

=== Senior career ===
On 18 March 2002, Thompson was called up to the full Scotland squad for the first time. He won his first cap against France, coming on as a 64th-minute substitute, in a 5–0 loss on 27 March 2002. On 17 April 2002, Thompson made his first start a month and played 75 minutes before being substituted, in a 2–1 loss against Nigeria. A month later, on 23 May 2002, he scored his first goal for Scotland, in a 1–0 win against a Hong Kong League XI during the HKSAR Reunification Cup. For the rest of 2002, Thompson began competing with Kevin Kyle and other strikers for the first choice role as a striker. He scored one more goal by the end of 2002, in a 3–1 friendly win over Canada at Easter Road on 15 October 2002.

However, Thompson’s lack of first team opportunities at Rangers limited his chances of playing for Scotland in early 2003. But in September, he made two more appearances for Scotland by the end of 2003, including setting up a goal, in a 2–1 loss against Germany.

In October 2004, Thompson was called up to the Scotland’s squad once again. On 13 October 2004, he scored the equalizing goal in a 1–1 draw away to Moldova in a World Cup qualifier. Following this, Thompson spent the rest of 2005, appearing as an unused substitute on two occasions.

Having not been called up to the Scotland squad for over four years, manager Owen Coyle called on George Burley to call him up to the squad but this never happened. Following his performance in the Scottish League Cup final, Thompson’s name was mentioned by the Herald as "thought to be names under consideration to be called up" by manager Gordon Strachan for the Scotland’s squad, but this never happened.

== Personal life ==
Growing up and raised in Houston, Thompson was a boyhood supporter of Rangers and St. Mirren. He witnessed the Scottish Cup final when the club beat Dundee United to win the tournament. Thompson is married to his wife, Joanna, and together they have two children, Gracie and Struan, who were both born in Wales. They currently resided in Paisley.

Outside of football, Thompson is known for doing pranks, impersonations and voices. Teammate Kevin McNaughton said about him: "'I call him [Steven] Dr Jekyll. He is a real Jekyll and Hyde character. Stephen comes across as shy, but if he has a drink he's an absolute animal." In one incident on 23 April 2015, at St Mirren’s Ralson Training Complex, Thompson threw a spiked pole at teammate John McGinn, after losing possession in a training session. The pole went a centimetre into McGinn's leg and tore the muscle, but did not do any long term damage; McGinn missed the remainder of the season due to this injury. Thompson apologised for the incident, describing it as a "prank", and acknowledged his fault.

Thompson is a musician and plays the guitar, having taught himself to play the instrument given by his father when he was nineteen and stated it helps him to relax. In May 2008, Thompson penned a song for Cardiff's FA Cup final appearance. His dad, Graham, is also a musician and plays in a Glasgow pub band called Dr. Cook and the Boners. After St Mirren won the Scottish League Cup, Thompson revealed he wrote a song for the club, but decided against playing the song in public, even if the club win the Cup.

While growing up, Thompson attended Houston Primary School and Gryffe High School, as did his children. His son, Struan, is following in his footsteps and is signed to St Mirren’s academy.

== Career statistics ==
=== Club ===
As of 2 May 2016

Club	Season	League			National cup (Note: Includes Scottish Cup, FA Cup)		League cup (Note: Includes Scottish League Cup, Football League Cup)		Other		Total	
Club	Season	Division	Apps	Goals	Apps	Goals	Apps	Goals	Apps	Goals	Apps	Goals
Dundee United	1996–97	Scottish Premier Division	1	0	0	0	0	0	–		1	0
Dundee United	1997–98	Scottish Premier Division	8	0	0	0	2	1	–		10	1
Dundee United	1998–99	Scottish Premier League	15	1	4	0	0	0	–		19	1
Dundee United	1999–2000	Scottish Premier League	27	1	3	2	4	3	–		34	6
Dundee United	2000–01	Scottish Premier League	31	4	4	0	2	0	–		37	4
Dundee United	2001–02	Scottish Premier League	31	6	3	2	3	2	–		37	10
Dundee United	2002–03	Scottish Premier League	20	6	0	0	3	3	–		23	9
Dundee United	Total		133	18	14	4	14	9	–		161	31
Rangers	2002–03	Scottish Premier League	8	2	3	0	–		–		11	2
Rangers	2003–04	Scottish Premier League	16	8	1	0	0	0	2 (Note: Appearances in UEFA Champions League)	0	19	8
Rangers	2004–05	Scottish Premier League	24	5	1	0	4	3	4 (Note: Two appearances and one goal in UEFA Champions League, two appearances and one goal in UEFA Cup)	2	33	10
Rangers	2005–06	Scottish Premier League	14	2	0	0	1	0	7	1	22	3
Rangers	Total		62	17	5	0	5	3	13	3	85	23
Cardiff City	2005–06	Championship	14	4	0	0	0	0	–		14	4
Cardiff City	2006–07	Championship	43	6	2	0	0	0	–		45	6
Cardiff City	2007–08	Championship	36	5	5	1	1	0	–		42	6
Cardiff City	2008–09	Championship	4	1	0	0	1	0	–		5	1
Cardiff City	Total		97	16	7	1	2	0	–		106	17
Burnley	2008–09	Championship	34	7	5	3	0	0	3 (Note: Appearances in Football League Championship play-offs)	1	42	11
Burnley	2009–10	Premier League	20	4	2	0	1	0	–		23	4
Burnley	2010–11	Championship	29	2	3	0	3	1	–		35	3
Burnley	Total		83	13	10	3	4	1	3	1	100	18
St Mirren	2011–12	Scottish Premiership	36	13	4	1	3	2	–		43	16
St Mirren	2012–13	Scottish Premiership	34	13	2	0	5	3	–		41	16
St Mirren	2013–14	Scottish Premiership	37	13	3	2	1	1	–		41	16
St Mirren	2014–15	Scottish Premiership	18	4	1	0	2	0	–		21	4
St Mirren	2015–16	Scottish Championship	28	1	1	0	1	0	2 (Note: Appearances in Scottish Challenge Cup)	1	32	2
St Mirren	Total		154	44	11	3	12	6	3	1	180	54
Career total			529	108	47	11	37	19	19	5	632	143

=== International ===
Scotland
Year	Apps	Goals
2002	7	2
2003	5	0
2004	4	1
Total	16	3

Scores and results list Scotland's goal tally first.

Goal	Date	Venue	Opponent	Score	Result	Competition
1	23 May 2002	Hong Kong Stadium, Hong Kong	Hong Kong	2–0	4–0	HKSAR Reunification Cup
2	15 October 2002	Easter Road, Edinburgh	Canada	2–1	3–1	Friendly
3	13 October 2004	Stadionul Republican, Chişinău	Moldova	1–1	1–1	2006 FIFA World Cup qualification

== Honours ==
Rangers

- Scottish Premier League: 2002–03, 2004–05
- Scottish Cup: 2002–03
- Scottish League Cup: 2004–05

Cardiff City

- FA Cup runner-up: 2007–08

Burnley

- Football League Championship play-offs: 2009

St Mirren

- Scottish League Cup: 2012–13
