= Fabián Caballero =

Argentine-Paraguayan footballer (1978–2024)

Personal information
- Full name: Néstor Fabián Caballero
- Date of birth: 31 January 1978
- Place of birth: Misiones, Argentina
- Date of death: 27 September 2024 (aged 46)
- Place of death: Asunción, Paraguay
- Height: 1.85 m (6 ft 1 in)
- Position: Forward

Youth career
- Guaraní Antonio Franco
- 1996: Estudiantes de La Plata

Senior career*
Years	Team	Apps	(Gls)
1995	Guaraní Antonio Franco		
1996	Estudiantes de La Plata		
1997	Tembetary		
1997–1999	Cerro Porteño		
1998–1999	→ Arsenal (loan)	1	(0)
1999	Tembetary		
2000	Sol de América		(13)
2000–2005	Dundee	124	(21)
2005	Olimpia Asunción	0	(0)
2006	Tacuary	2	(0)
2007	Daejeon Citizen	6	(0)
2007	Alki		
2008	Provincial Osorno	15	(3)
2009	Panachaiki		
2010	Nacional Asunción	26	(4)
2011	Municipal		(2)
2012	Tacuary	3	(0)
2013–2014	Sportivo Ameliano	15	(4)
2014	Deportivo Recoleta		

Managerial career
- 2012–2014: Sportivo Ameliano U16
- 2012–2014: Sportivo Ameliano U18
- 2012–2014: Sportivo Ameliano II
- 2014: Sportivo Ameliano
- * Club domestic league appearances and goals as of 31 July 2014

Néstor Fabián Caballero (31 January 1978 – 27 September 2024), commonly referred to as Tyson, was an Argentine-Paraguayan professional footballer who played as a forward.

Caballero had a 19-year career, playing in Argentina, Paraguay, England, Scotland, South Korea, Cyprus, Chile, Greece and Guatemala, and also playing in continental competitions such as the UEFA Intertoto Cup, the UEFA Cup, the Copa Libertadores and the Copa Sudamericana. In 1998, Caballero was loaned from Cerro Porteño to Arsenal for the 1998–99 FA Premier League season, where he made a total of three appearances in all competitions. In 2000, Caballero signed with Scottish Premier League club Dundee, where he was present until 2005. He played in the 2001 UEFA Intertoto Cup and finished as runners-up in the 2002–03 Scottish Cup, after a 1–0 loss against Rangers in the final on 31 May 2003. Caballero scored 27 goals in 128 appearances in all competitions for Dundee.

Caballero was leading goal scorer of the Torneo Apertura during the 2000 Paraguayan Primera División season with 13 goals whilst playing for Club Sol de América. In 2004, Caballero was awarded as the Player of the Season of Dundee FC for the 2003–04 season.

Caballero began his coaching career with Sportivo Ameliano in 2012, working with the club's U16, U18 and reserve-teams, he later became a Player-coach whilst playing for the club's first-team in 2014.

Whilst playing with Arsenal's reserve-team, Caballero was described as "making very good runs which create space for the other forwards" and that the squad looked "infinitely more dangerous" when he was on the field.

In May 2015, Caballero announced that was running for election as a city councilor in Asunción.

== Playing career ==
=== Early career ===
Caballero began his career with Guaraní Antonio Franco in his native Posadas, Misiones. He then joined Estudiantes de La Plata of the city La Plata in the province of Buenos Aires, where he joined the U20 youth team. Caballero was then transferred to Atlético Tembetary of the Paraguayan Primera División. The son of Spanish parents, he lived in Paraguay for most of his teenage life.

=== Cerro Porteño ===
On 1 August 1997, Caballero signed with Cerro Porteño in the Paraguayan Primera División, where he joined the likes of Diego Gavilan and Paulo da Silva.

==== 1998 season ====
Caballero participated in the 1998 Copa Libertadores as Cerro Porteño were drawn with Uruguay's Peñarol in the quarter-final stage. On 20 May, Caballero played 55 minutes of the first-leg of the quarter-final, before being replaced by Sergio Fernandez, in Cerro Porteño's 2–0 away defeat. In the return leg on 27 May, Caballero would play 69 minutes of the match before being replaced by Oscar Ferreira, as Cerro Porteño would win 3–0 and qualify for the semi-finals with a 3–2 aggregate score line. At the semi-final stage, Cerro Porteño faced Ecuador's Barcelona Sporting Club. After a 1–0 away defeat on 16 July, Cerro Porteño hosted the return leg at the Estadio Defensores del Chaco on 22 July. Caballero scored in the 4th minute of the match to level the scores 1–1 on aggregate; the match concluded in a 2–1 for Cerro Porteño, being 2–2 on aggregate. Barcelona went on to win via penalties, with Barcelona goal keeper José Cevallos saving Caballero's and two other of Cerro Porteño's penalties, eliminating Cerro Porteño from the competition. Caballero had scored 1 goal in 10 Copa Libertadores appearances.

==== Loan to Arsenal ====
On 29 October 1998, Caballero was loaned to Arsenal from Cerro Porteño for the remainder of the 1998–99 FA Premier League season (with an option for a permanent transfer), where he was issued the number #26. Caballero was also part of the club's reserve-team, playing in the 1998–99 FA Premier Reserve League and scoring eight goals in 16 league appearances as the squad finished in ninth position of the table with 45 points. He played in the reserve-team alongside Nwankwo Kanu, Alberto Méndez, Jason Crowe and Kaba Diawara. His first goal for the reserve-team came in a 4–1 away defeat against Wimbledon on 4 November. Caballero would go on to score in the next three matches in a 3–3 home draw with Fulham (16 November), a 2–1 away victory against AFC Bournemouth (24 November) and a 2–0 home victory against Queens Park Rangers (30 November), totaling to a run of four goals in four consecutive matches. He made his debut for Arsenal's first-team as a substitute in a 5–0 home defeat by Chelsea on 11 November 1998 in the League Cup, entering the field for Dennis Bergkamp in the second half. On 29 November 1998, Caballero debuted in the Premier League in a 1–1 home draw against Middlesbrough, when he was substituted onto the field for Freddie Ljungberg in the 74th minute of the match. Caballero went on to make one more appearance for Arsenal, in a 4–2 FA Cup third-round victory away against Preston North End on 4 January 1999, where he assisted Emmanuel Petit in scoring one of Arsenal's goals. He would score his last goals for the club's reserve-team scoring once in a 5–0 home thrashing against Crystal Palace on 7 April and scoring a double in a 3–1 home victory against Ipswich Town on 21 April. Caballero would take no part in Arsenal's 1998–99 UEFA Champions League campaign when, after making three appearances in all competitions, he was released on 9 June 1999 and returned to Paraguay to join former club Atlético Tembetary.

=== Sol de América ===
In Round 1 of the Torneo Apertura 2000 Paraguayan Primera División season. Caballado scored Sol de América's only goal in the 25th minute in their 4–1 home loss against Colegiales. In the following round, Caballero scored an 83rd-minute equalizer in a 2–2 away draw against Guaraní. In the following two matches, Caballero would score in a 3–1 home victory against Sportivo Luqueño and in a 2–1 away victory against former club Cerro Porteño, bringing his tally to four goals in four league appearances. He would not score again until two rounds later in Round 7, scoring in the 32nd minute of a 1–0 away victory against Club Universal. In the following week, Caballero scored a double in a 3–0 home victory against Cerro Corá. In Round 11, Caballero scored a double in a 3–3 home draw against Guaraní and would score one goal in the following match, a 2–1 away loss against Sportivo Luqueño, with the goal in the latter match bringing his tally to 10 league goals. Caballero would not score again until Round 16, where he would score a double in a 4–2 home victory against Club Universal on 25 June. On 9 July, he scored his 13th and last goal of the season in a 1–1 home draw against Olimpia Asunción, equalizing in the 70th minute of the match. Caballero was awarded as the league's leading goal scorer with his 13 goals, respectively.

=== Dundee (2000–2005) ===
==== 2000–01 season ====
On 1 July 2000, Caballero signed with Dundee for the 2000–01 Scottish Premier League season, being issued with the number #7. Caballero was initially on loan to the club but Dundee eventually signed him permanently. There, he was under the guidance of Italian coach Ivano Bonetti, and would also join Argentine footballers Juan Sara, Luis Alberto Carranza, Walter del Río, Claudio Caniggia and Pascual Garrido. Caballero made his first appearance in the SPL against Motherwell in a 2–0 away victory on 29 July. One week later, he scored his first goal in a 3–0 home victory against Dunfermline Athletic on 5 August. On 12 August, Caballero scored in a 5–1 away defeat against Hibernian and also received his first red card. On 23 August, Caballero scored a double in a 3–0 home League cup victory against Montrose. Four days later, he scored again in a 1–1 home league match against Heart of Midlothian on 27 August, the goal being his fifth goal in four consecutive matches. During October 2000, Dundee opted to sign Claudio Caniggia as a replacement for Caballero who had surgery to repair a damaged knee and underwent extensive rehabilitation at a Bologna clinic. Caballero scored his fourth league goal in a 2–0 away victory against Aberdeen on 7 April. On 4 May 2001, it was reported by BBC Sport that Caballero had signed a new deal which would keep him at the club for the following three seasons. The club had paid an undisclosed fee to Paraguay's Club Sol de América to make Caballero's loan deal permanent and that the sum was significant enough to top the club record of £300,000 paid for Javier Artero. He scored his last goals of the season, a double, against Celtic, in a 2–0 away victory on 13 May. Dundee were eventually eliminated by Heart of Midlothian at the fourth round stage of 2000–01 Scottish Cup. Dundee eventually finished in 6th position of the SPL table, with 47 points, and qualified for the first round of the 2001 UEFA Intertoto Cup. Caballero ended the season having scored 6 goals in 15 league appearances and 2 goals in 2 League Cup appearances.

==== 2001–02 season ====
Dundee faced FK Smederevo of Serbia and Montenegro in the UEFA Intertoto Cup, where they would draw 0–0 at home in the first-leg on 16 June. In the second-leg on 23 June, Caballero scored in the 5th minute of the first half as Caballero was eventually red carded during the match. Dundee went on to be defeated 5–2. Caballero's first appearance of the 2001–02 Scottish Premier League season came in a 2–1 home victory against Hibernian, where Caballero scored the winning goal on 62 minutes, on 4 August. He scored his second league goal in a 4–1 home defeat to Aberdeen on 29 September. Caballero scored Dundee's 2–1 League Cup away defeat against Ross Country on 9 October. Three weeks later, Caballero scored in a 3–1 home victory against Motherwell on 30 October. His next goal would not arrive until 13 February, where he scored in Dundee's 2–2 home draw against Dunfermline. Caballero ended the season scoring two consecutive goals in the last two fixtures. Scoring once in a 2–2 away draw against Hibernian on 27 April, and scoring another goal in a 2–1 away loss against Motherwell on 12 May. Dundee made it to the Fourth round of the 2001–02 Scottish Cup, losing to Partick Thistle. Dundee also made it to the quarter-final stages of the 2001–02 Scottish League Cup, losing to Hibernian. Caballero concluded the season scoring 8 goals in 39 appearances in all competitions as Dundee concluded the season in 9th position, with 44 points.

==== 2002–03 season ====
On 3 August, Caballero scored in his first appearance of the 2002–03 season, a 65th-minute equalizer in 1–1 home draw against Hearts. Three weeks later, he scored his second goal in a 2–1 home victory against Hibernian on 24 August. In the second-round of the League Cup, Caballero scored in Dundee's 3–1 victory against Queen of the South on 25 September. Caballero scored a 90th minute winning goal in a 2–1 home victory against Kilmarnock on 5 October. Dundee were eliminated in the third-round of the League Cup after a 1–0 defeat against Partick Thistle on 22 October. On 23 November, Caballero scored for the first time in the Dundee derby, a double, at Dens Park, in a 3–2 victory. He scored the first two goals of the match, in the 11th and 30th minute. On 15 March, Caballero scored in a 3–3 away draw against Aberdeen. In Caballero's second last league match of the season, he scored a first-half double in a 2–2 home draw against Rangers on 4 May. In the 2002–03 Scottish Cup, Dundee commenced in the third-round, getting past the likes of Partick Thistle (2–0), Aberdeen (2–0), Falkirk (1–1, a replay was played on 9 April where Caballero scored in the 44th minute of Dundee's 4–1 victory) and Inverness CT (1–0) in order to make the final. On 31 May, Dundee were defeated 1–0 against Rangers in the final, as Caballero played a full 90-minutes of the match. Dundee concluded the season in 6th place, with 44 points, and qualified for the first-round of the 2003–04 UEFA Cup, where they faced Perugia. Caballero had scored 10 goals in 42 appearances in all competitions.

==== 2003–04 season ====
On 15 October 2013, Caballero participated in a 2003–04 UEFA Cup First-Round 1–0 away loss against Perugia which saw Dundee exit the competition. On 25 November 2003, Caballero endured a career break, having made 15 total appearances for Dundee during 2003–04 Scottish Premier League season. This was due to the club's failure to sell on players as anticipated, and insufficient income was raised to fund the large wage bill, under owners Peter & James Marr, resulting in a £23 million debt. During this period, Caballero returned to Paraguay and temporarily trained with Tacuary. After speaking with Paraguayan newspaper ABC Color, Caballero informed that Dundee was not well economically and could not pay the players who had an elevated salary and released them. He also informed that he received an offer from Club Olimpia Asunción but his wish was to return to the exterior.

==== 2004–05 season ====
Caballero eventually returned to the club on 1 October 2004 to commence his second spell as a Dundee player. Caballero's return was funded by directors, fans and local businessmen. Caballero informed "I am very happy to be back at Dundee and am looking forward to playing for the club and the fans once again. It is good to see the people again and I always wanted to come back one day. The last 10 months have been very hard, but my daughter was born in February so she gave me inspiration to keep going. She was born on 26 February and I am going to wear number 26 for her". Upon Caballero's return to Dundee, his first appearance of the 2004–05 Scottish Premier League season came in a 1–1 away draw against Aberdeen on 2 October, where he was substituted onto the field for John Sutton in the 77th minute. A fortnight after his regression to Dundee, Caballero returned to Paraguay to deal with a personal matter. First-team coach, Jim Duffy, who had told Caballero that he could have waited until after Dundee's 3–1 win over Kilmarnock to travel, expected Caballero to return by the following week and focused on his football and respectively described Caballero as a "the type of guy that, when he has a problem, he has to deal with it immediately". He scored his first goal of the season in a 1–1 home draw against Hearts on 22 January, scoring the first goal of the match in the 54th minute. He made one Cup appearance in a 2–0 away defeat against Hibernian on 8 January. Caballero finished the season with 1 goal in 29 appearances in all competitions. Dundee finished in 12th position of the SPL table, with 33 points, and were subsequently relegated to the Scottish First Division for the 2005–06 season. Caballero was released by the club on 23 May 2005.

=== Olimpia Asunción ===
In July 2005, Caballero returned to Paraguay to join Olimpia Asunción for the 2005 Paraguayan Primera División season. On 27 July, he first appeared for Olimpia in a friendly match against Fénix which ended 0–0 in Montevideo. He was not taken into account by the club's first-team coach and decided to see if he could play for the club's reserve-team. During a meeting with Olimpia's president, Caballero expressed his desire to play and stated that the year was ending.

=== Latter career ===
In January 2006, he was transferred to Club Tacuary for the 2006 Paraguayan Primera División season, Caballero made just two league appearances. Tacuary qualified for the 2007 Copa Libertadores as the best finisher in the aggregate points table and the 2007 Copa Sudamericana by winning the 2006 Liguilla Pre-Sudamericana. In January 2007, Caballero joined K League club Daejeon Citizen FC, making 6 league appearances. In July 2007, he was released from the club and signed for Cypriot club Alki Larnaca for the first half of the 2007–08 season. In January 2008, Caballero signed with Chilean outfit Provincial Osorno for the 2008 Chilean Primera División season. Caballero scored 3 goals in 15 league appearances for Osorno, in 2–0 away victory against Huachipato on 3 February, a 3–1 home victory against Melipilla on 3 March, and in a 3–1 home defeat against Concepción on 23 March. In June 2008, Caballero signed with Greek club Panachaiki for the 2007–08 Gamma Ethniki season, where he was coached by Australian coach Ange Postecoglou. In January 2010, Caballero signed with Nacional Asunción, where he was reunited with coach Ever Hugo Almeida. He participated in the 2010 Paraguayan Primera División season, scoring 4 goals (including a double in a 3–0 away victory against former club Tacuary on 16 May) in 26 appearances, and also participated in the 2010 Copa Libertadores, making two appearances (one appearance in a 1–0 away defeat against Once Caldas on 1 April, and the other in a 2–0 home victory against Monterrey on 21 April). In January 2011, Caballero signed with C.S.D. Municipal for the 2010–11 Liga Nacional de Fútbol de Guatemala season. During his stint at the club, his only goals, a double, came in a 4–1 away defeat against Deportivo Xinabajul on 24 April. In July 2012, Caballero returned to Tacuary where he made 3 league appearances and also participated in the preliminary stages of the 2012 Copa Sudamericana, where Tacuary lost 3–2 on aggregate to Chilean club Cobreloa.

=== Sportivo Ameliano ===
In 2013, Caballero joined Primera División C side Club Sportivo Ameliano, scoring 4 goals in 14 league appearances during the 2013 season. He would play in the starting-11 of the squad as a striker either alongside or being replaced by Marcos Caballero. Prior to the 2014 season, Caballero became a Player-coach, when he was employed as the first-team coach of the club.

=== Deportivo Recoleta ===
In July 2014, Caballero transferred to Primera División C club Deportivo Recoleta, featuring in a 3–1 away victory against Valois Rivarola where he was substituted off of the field in the 67th minute of the match.

== Coaching career ==
In 2012, Caballero began coaching in order to receive his badges from the APF and was placed in charge of Sportivo Ameliano's under–16, under–18 and reserve-team squads. In 2014, Caballero, by then a Player-coach, was additionally placed in charge of the club's respective first-team.

== Death ==
Caballero died in the Villa Morra neighbourhood of Asunción, Paraguay, on 27 September 2024, from a heart attack while playing futsal. He was 46.

== Career statistics ==
Appearances and goals by club, season and competition
Club	Season	League		National cup		League cup		Continental		Total	
Club	Season	Apps	Goals	Apps	Goals	Apps	Goals	Apps	Goals	Apps	Goals
Cerro Porteño	1998							10	1	10	1
Arsenal	1998–99	1	0	1	0	1	0	0	0	3	0
Sol de América	2000		13								13
Dundee	2000–01	15	6			2	2			17	8
Dundee	2001–02	32	6	4	0	1	1	2	1	39	8
Dundee	2002–03	36	8	5	1	1	1			42	10
Dundee	2003–04	13	0	0	0	1	0	1	0	15	0
Dundee	2004–05	28	1	1	0	0	0			29	1
Dundee	Total	124	21	10	1	4	4	3	1	142	27
Tacuary	2006	2	0							2	0
Provincial Osorno	2008	15	3							15	3
Nacional Asunción	2010	26	4					2	0	28	4
Tacuary	2012	3	0					1	0	4	0
Sportivo Ameliano	2013	14	4							14	4
Sportivo Ameliano	2014	1	0							1	0
Deportivo Recoleta	2014	1	0							1	0
Career total		187	45	11	1	5	4	6	2	210	52

== Honours ==
Dundee

- Scottish Cup runner-up: 2002–03

Individual

- 2000 Paraguayan Primera División season Torneo Apertura leading goal scorer (13 goals)
- Dundee FC Player of the season (2003–04 season)

== See also ==
- 1998–99 Arsenal F.C. season
- 2000–01 Dundee F.C. season
- List of expatriate footballers in Paraguay
- Players and Records in Paraguayan Football
