= 2003 Scottish Cup final =

2003 Scottish Cup Final
- Event: 2002–03 Scottish Cup
Dundee	Rangers
0	1
- Date: 31 May 2003
- Venue: Hampden Park, Glasgow
- Referee: Kenny Clark
- Attendance: 47,136

The 2003 Scottish Cup Final was played on 31 May 2003 at Hampden Park in Glasgow and was the final of the 117th Scottish Cup. The final was contested by Dundee and Rangers. Rangers won the match 1–0 with a Lorenzo Amoruso headed goal in the second half. It was also Amoruso’s last game for Rangers, as he headed to Blackburn Rovers in the summer.

== Match details ==
31 May 2003

Dundee	0–1	Rangers
	Report	Amoruso 66'

Hampden Park, Glasgow
Attendance: 47,136
Referee: Kenny Clark

DUNDEE:
GK	12	(Argentina) Julián Speroni
DF	3	(Scotland) Dave Mackay	(substituted off) 78'
DF	13	(Georgia (country)) Zurab Khizanishvili
DF	2	(Scotland) Barry Smith (c)
DF	16	(Venezuela) Jonay Hernández
MF	8	(Scotland) Gavin Rae	(substituted off) 85'
MF	10	(Georgia (country)) Georgi Nemsadze
MF	19	(Scotland) Lee Mair
FW	18	(Scotland) Mark Burchill	(substituted off) 71'
FW	7	(Argentina) Fabián Caballero
FW	25	(England) Steve Lovell
Substitutes:
GK	1	(Scotland) Jamie Langfield
MF	25	(Scotland) Garry Brady	(substituted on) 85'
MF	5	(Argentina) Beto Carranza
FW	15	(Scotland) Steven Milne	(substituted on) 78'
FW	17	(Spain) Nacho Novo	(substituted on) 71'
Manager:
(Scotland) Jim Duffy

RANGERS:
GK	1	(Germany) Stefan Klos
DF	2	(Netherlands) Fernando Ricksen
DF	4	(Italy) Lorenzo Amoruso
DF	3	(Australia) Craig Moore
DF	5	(Netherlands) Arthur Numan	(substituted off) 68'
MF	6	(Scotland) Barry Ferguson (c)
MF	14	(Netherlands) Ronald de Boer
MF	12	(Scotland) Robert Malcolm
FW	24	(Georgia (country)) Shota Arveladze	(substituted off) 56'
FW	11	(Scotland) Neil McCann
FW	10	(Netherlands) Michael Mols	(substituted off) 45'
Substitutes:
GK	22	(Scotland) Allan McGregor
DF	17	(Australia) Kevin Muscat	(substituted on) 68'
DF	21	(Scotland) Maurice Ross	(substituted on) 45'
FW	19	(Scotland) Steven Thompson	(substituted on) 56'
FW	36	(Scotland) Steven MacLean
Manager:
(Scotland) Alex McLeish
