= Gavin Rae =

Scottish footballer and manager

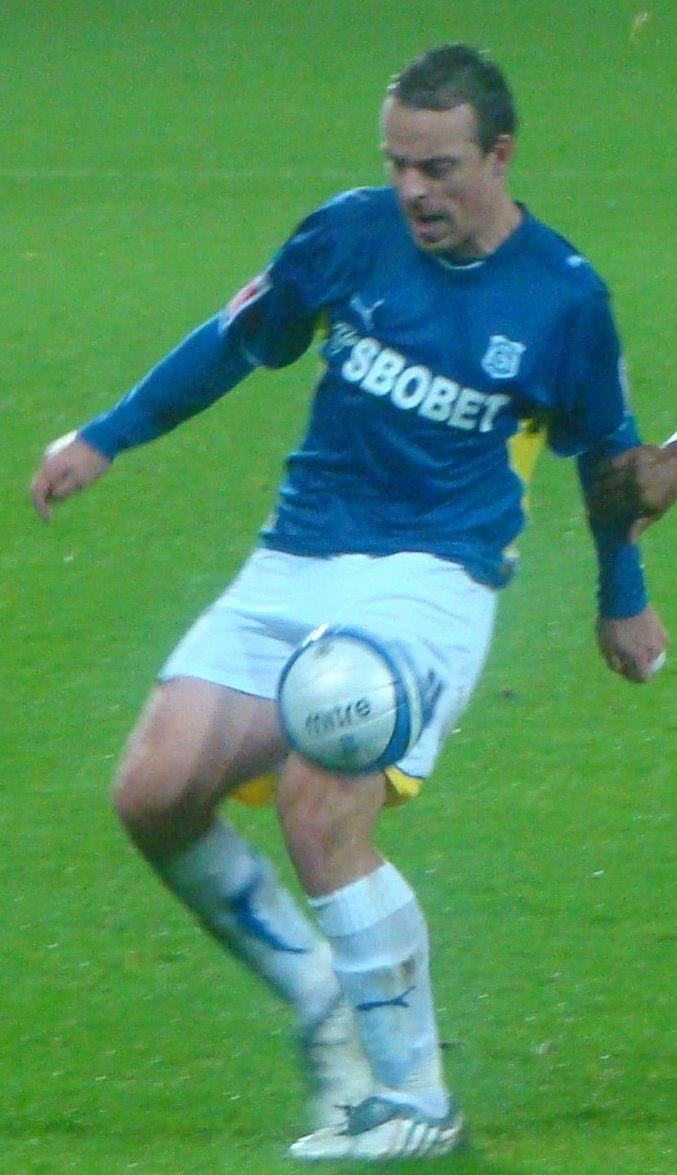
- Rae playing for Cardiff City in 2009

Personal information
- Full name: Gavin Paul Rae
- Date of birth: 28 November 1977 (age 48)
- Place of birth: Aberdeen, Scotland
- Position: Midfielder

Senior career*
Years	Team	Apps	(Gls)
1996–2004	Dundee	223	(26)
2004–2007	Rangers	28	(3)
2007–2011	Cardiff City	130	(7)
2011–2012	Dundee	13	(3)
2012–2013	Aberdeen	47	(3)
2013–2014	Dundee	14	(1)
2014–2018	Hakoah Sydney City East	57	(2)
Total		512	(45)

International career
1999	Scotland U21	6	(1)
2001–2009	Scotland	14	(0)

Managerial career
- 2017–2019: Hakoah Sydney City East
- 2019–2021: Rydalmere Lions
- * Club domestic league appearances and goals

Gavin Paul Rae (born 28 November 1977) is a Scottish professional football manager and former player.

A midfielder, Rae started his playing career with Dundee, making over 200 league appearances for the club. He moved to Rangers in January 2004, but struggled to hold down a regular place in their team due to injury. He moved to Cardiff City in 2007 and featured regularly in the team that reached the 2008 FA Cup final. Rae left Cardiff in 2011 and had spells later in his career with Dundee and Aberdeen. He also won 14 caps for Scotland between 2001 and 2009.

Rae began coaching Hakoah Sydney City East in 2018 while still registered as a player with the club. From 2019 to 2021 he managed Rydalmere Lions.

== Club career ==
=== Dundee ===
Rae was born in Aberdeen. His first club was Dundee. In total he made 223 games for the club scoring 26 goals in a period of eight years. In November 1999 he memorably scored a last minute winner to beat future club Rangers at Ibrox.

Rae stuck with the club during the bad financial days during the 2003–2004 season when Dundee hit administration until he was sold to Rangers for £250,000 in January 2004.

=== Rangers ===
Rae made his debut for Rangers on 3 January 2004 against Celtic but only lasted 30 minutes due to a hamstring injury. After recovering, he managed to score his first goal against Dundee, his former club. However, he suffered another injury, damaging his knee against Dundee United on 24 April 2004. His road to recovery was hit by several set-backs before he finally made his return to the Rangers first team on 18 February 2006 against Hibernian. He went on to make regular appearances in the Rangers team, particularly towards the end of the season with fellow midfielder Barry Ferguson requiring an operation due to a long running leg injury.

In the 2006–07 season, Rae was given the captaincy in a number of games when Barry Ferguson was not playing. On 1 January 2007, he was announced as permanent captain after Ferguson's meeting with Paul Le Guen, which saw Ferguson stripped of the captaincy and removed from the squad. On 4 January 2007, Le Guen resigned from the managerial position at Rangers and new manager Walter Smith re-appointed Ferguson as club captain. He was offered a new deal at the club by Smith but he decided it would be better for him to attempt to find first team football. Rae left Rangers as a free agent at the end of the 2006–07 season when his contract expired.

On 21 May 2007, he was linked with a move to Heart of Midlothian with his former teammate at Rangers, Stephen Hughes but the move did not come to fruition.

=== Cardiff City ===
Rae was watched by several sides from England, Wales and Scotland and came very close to joining Football League Championship side Norwich City but instead on 23 June 2007 he joined Championship side Cardiff City along with fellow Scotsman Steven MacLean on a free transfer. On 26 June 2007, he was quoted in an interview saying "Believe me, I am coming to Cardiff fully fit and fully committed. I am fired up to make the most of this chance".

On his arrival Rae found himself in first team action from the start of the season due to a long-term injury to Riccardo Scimeca and also took over the captaincy for the 2–1 home win against Burnley with Darren Purse starting the match on the bench, Scimeca injured and Stephen McPhail dropped from the side and he scored his first goal for the Bluebirds not long after on 15 September in a 2–1 victory over Plymouth Argyle. He went on to make a total of 55 appearances in all competitions in his first year, more than any other player at the club including playing in all six matches during the clubs run to the FA Cup Final.

The following season began badly for Rae when, after making just two appearances, he chipped a bone in his leg just below his knee during a 2–1 win over AFC Bournemouth in the League Cup. Rae was told that he could continue playing with the injury if he could withstand the pain, returning to the side after a month out. He went on to appear in 46 matches in all competitions for Cardiff, the second highest amount behind Roger Johnson.

Rae started the 2009–10 season on the bench but was handed his first appearance of the year after 45 minutes of the opening game with Joe Ledley suffering from an illness. With Ledley away on international duty, he was handed a start in a 3–1 win over Dagenham & Redbridge in the first round of the Football League Cup and scored the first goal of the game. He made his 400th club appearance in a 4–3 win over Sheffield United on 24 October 2009, coming on for Stephen McPhail, and made his 100th league appearance for Cardiff on 1 November 2009 against Nottingham Forest as a substitute. During a 4–4 draw with Peterborough United on 28 December 2009, Rae suffered a broken hand keeping him out for up to four weeks, but returned on 9 January 2010 against Blackpool after a remarkable recovery. On 9 April 2010, Rae was confirmed to be sidelined for the rest of the season after he suffered a ruptured tendon in his ankle. Having fallen out of favour at the start of the 2010–11 season following the arrivals of Danny Drinkwater and Seyi Olofinjana, Rae was allowed to open talks with Leeds United in August 2010 over a possible transfer. Rae left Cardiff later in the summer.

=== Return to Dundee ===
Aberdeen were interested in signing Rae, but on 14 October 2011, he signed a short-term deal with his former club Dundee. Rae scored against Morton in a 2–1 victory. On 26 November 2011, Rae scored a header against Falkirk as Dundee won 4–2. Rae also scored against Kilmarnock in a fourth round Scottish Cup Replay with Dundee losing out 2–1.

=== Aberdeen ===
On 30 January 2012, Rae signed for his home town club Aberdeen. He scored his first goal for the club in the Scottish League Cup against Greenock Morton, and his first league goal for Aberdeen on 23 September 2012 playing against Motherwell. He then went on to score goals against Hibernian and Kilmarnock. Rae left Aberdeen at the end of the 2012–13 season, as his contract was not renewed.

=== Third spell at Dundee ===
On 6 June 2013, Rae once again joined Dundee, this time as a player/coach. He scored his first goal in this spell in a 4–1 win against Dumbarton on 12 October 2013. He decided to leave the club after gaining promotion to the Scottish Premiership in May 2014 and subsequently retired.

=== Hakoah Sydney City East ===
In September 2014, Rae moved to Australia and signed with National Premier Leagues NSW club Hakoah Sydney City East.

== Managerial career ==
=== Hakoah Sydney City East FC ===
Rae became Hakoah's head coach in January 2018 while still registered as a player. He retired as a player later that year. He left the club in July 2019.

=== Rydalmere Lions FC ===
Rae was appointed Rydalmere Lions manager in September 2019. He and his assistant Neil Jablonski left the club in August 2021.

== International career ==
Rae was still at Dundee when he gained international recognition, winning his first cap for Scotland in 2001 against Poland. On 24 March 2008 he received his first call-up to the squad for two years, and also his first while at Cardiff. He came on as a substitute at half-time during a 1–1 draw with Croatia. Rae was once again called up to replace the suspended James McFadden in a 2010 World Cup qualifier against Holland on 9 September 2009.

== Other ventures ==
Along with Curtis Davies and Chris Burke, Rae co-founded and was a director of the clothing company Seven One Zero, which was voluntarily dissolved in 2018.

== Career statistics ==
Appearances and goals by club, season and competition
Club	Season	League			National cup (Note: Includes Scottish Cup, FA Cup.)		League cup (Note: Includes Scottish League Cup, League Cup.)		Continental		Total	
Club	Season	Division	Apps	Goals	Apps	Goals	Apps	Goals	Apps	Goals	Apps	Goals
Dundee	1995–96	Scottish Premier Division	6	0	–		–		–		6	0
Dundee	1996–97	Scottish Premier Division	17	2	3	0	–		–		20	2
Dundee	1997–98	Scottish Premier Division	6	0	–		–		–		6	0
Dundee	1998–99	Scottish Premier League	30	1	–		–		–		30	1
Dundee	1999–2000	Scottish Premier League	35	4	2	1	3	0	–		40	5
Dundee	2000–01	Scottish Premier League	32	4	4	0	2	0	1	0	39	4
Dundee	2001–02	Scottish Premier League	36	6	2	0	2	0	1	0	41	6
Dundee	2002–03	Scottish Premier League	37	4	6	1	1	0	–		44	5
Dundee	2003–04	Scottish Premier League	13	2	–		1	0	4	1	18	3
Dundee	Total		212	23	17	2	9	0	6	1	244	26
Rangers	2003–04	Scottish Premier League	10	2	1	0	–		–		11	2
Rangers	2004–05	Scottish Premier League	–		–		–		–		0	0
Rangers	2005–06	Scottish Premier League	8	0	–		–		–		8	0
Rangers	2006–07	Scottish Premier League	10	1	1	0	2	0	7	0	20	1
Rangers	Total		28	3	2	0	2	0	7	0	39	3
Cardiff City	2007–08	Championship	45	4	6	0	4	0	–		55	4
Cardiff City	2008–09	Championship	41	1	3	0	2	0	–		46	1
Cardiff City	2009–10	Championship	36	1	2	0	3	1	–		41	2
Cardiff City	2010–11	Championship	7	1	2	0	1	0	–		10	1
Cardiff City	Total		129	7	13	0	10	1	0	0	152	8
Career total			369	33	32	2	21	1	13	1	435	37

== Honours ==
=== Player ===
Dundee

- Scottish Championship: 1997–98, 2013–14
- Scottish Cup runner-up: 2002–03

Cardiff City

- FA Cup runner-up: 2007–08

Scotland

- Kirin Cup: 2006

=== Manager ===
Hakoah Sydney City East

- Waratah Cup: 2017; runner-up 2018

Rydalmere Lions

- NPL NSW Three Championship: 2020
- NPL NSW Three Premiers: 2020
