= Kiko Torres =

Spanish footballer

Personal information
- Full name: Enrique Torres Martín
- Date of birth: 28 October 1975 (age 51)
- Place of birth: Madrid, Spain
- Height: 1.80 m (5 ft 11 in)
- Position: Midfielder

Youth career
- Real Madrid

Senior career*
Years	Team	Apps	(Gls)
1995–1998	Real Madrid B	20	(2)
1998–1999	Valladolid B	26	(1)
1999–2001	Murcia	52	(3)
2001–2002	Dundee	19	(1)
2002–2003	Tenerife	16	(4)
2003–2005	Elche	5	(0)

International career
1994	Spain U18	2	(0)
1995	Spain U19	2	(0)
- * Club domestic league appearances and goals

Enrique 'Kiko' Torres Martín (born 28 October 1975 in Madrid) is a Spanish former professional footballer who played as a midfielder.

Torres spent the 2001–02 season at Scottish club Dundee after signing for them in December 2001. He scored his first goal for the club in a Scottish Cup tie against Partick Thistle, and his second came in the league against St Johnstone. He was released by the club in the summer of 2002.
