= Lorenzo Amoruso =

Italian footballer (born 1971)

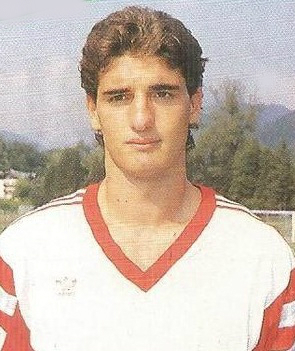
- Amoruso in 1989

Personal information
- Date of birth: 28 June 1971 (age 55)
- Place of birth: Bari, Italy
- Height: 1.84 m (6 ft 0 in)
- Position: Defender

Senior career*
Years	Team	Apps	(Gls)
1988–1995	Bari	75	(8)
1991–1992	→ Mantova (loan)	13	(1)
1992–1993	→ Pescara (loan)	19	(1)
1995–1997	Fiorentina	54	(3)
1997–2003	Rangers	149	(13)
2003–2006	Blackburn Rovers	18	(3)
2008	Cosmos		
Total		338	(29)

International career
1989–1991	Italy U-21	2	(0)
- * Club domestic league appearances and goals

Lorenzo Amoruso (born 28 June 1971) is an Italian sports commentator and former professional footballer who played as a defender for seven teams in Italy, Scotland, England, and San Marino during his footballing career, but is perhaps best known for his six-year spell with Glasgow side Rangers. In that six-year spell, he won nine major honours with the club including domestic trebles in the 1998–99 and 2002–03 seasons, representing the side on more than 150 occasions in competitive football.

== Club career ==
=== Italy ===
Amoruso began his career at local club, Bari, in 1988, for whom he went on to make 75 appearances, scoring 8 goals. Amoruso spent 1991–1993 on loan at Mantova and Pescara, but only featured intermittently. In 1995, he secured a move to Fiorentina, becoming club captain and making 54 appearances. He won the Coppa Italia in 1996 and in 1997 the Florence side went on a run in Europe where they reached the semi-finals of the UEFA Cup Winners Cup only to lose out to eventual champions Barcelona.

=== Rangers ===
Following interest from Manchester United, Amoruso signed for Rangers on 29 May 1997 for a fee of £4million. Whilst with the club he won the Scottish Premier League on three occasions, as well as the Scottish Cup three times and the Scottish League Cup three times. He missed most of his debut season with an Achilles tendon injury, and didn't make his debut until April 1998 as a substitute for Gordan Petrić in the Scottish Cup semi-final against Celtic. He was then installed as captain of Rangers by Dick Advocaat in 1998. After returning to the team Amoruso was booed by Rangers fans after several poor displays and tactical errors. Amoruso also clashed with the manager several times, resulting in an eventually aborted move to Sunderland. Advocaat began to sign defenders to replace Amoruso, including Bert Konterman and Paul Ritchie, but the Italian remained after his replacements failed. Ritchie did not make a single appearance and Konterman was criticised to begin with, but, like Amoruso, he eventually found his way into the hearts of the fans.

In December 1999, Amoruso issued a public apology after directing racist comments at Borussia Dortmund's Nigerian striker Victor Ikpeba. Earlier that day Amoruso's denied the allegations and threatened legal action in an interview to Corriere dello Sport – Stadio (an Italian daily sports paper). He was later forced into a change of position, described as embarrassing by The Times, when TV footage contradicted his story. Subsequently, the BBC featured reports that Rangers supporters' racism had increased, in support of Amoruso.

In the 2000–01 season, when Rangers exited the UEFA Champions League to Monaco partly because of another bad mistake by Amoruso, he was stripped of the captaincy (which went to the 22-year-old Barry Ferguson). Amoruso had captained the club for two years, the first ever Catholic to do so. He was left humiliated by the demotion and later accused Advocaat of trying to destroy him.

After Dick Advocaat's October 2000 attack on what he described as "fat necks" in his squad, reports named the Italian as a probable target. More errors had seen Amoruso again booed by his own teams' supporters. During this period Amoruso was linked with moves to English clubs Fulham and West Ham United.

Advocaat was later removed as manager and Amoruso rediscovered his form under new boss Alex McLeish; winning the 2002 Scottish PFA Players' Player of the Year. After a four-match ban for spitting on James Grady, he scored the winning goal in his final game for Rangers—the 2003 Scottish Cup final—and wept as he left the pitch.

=== Blackburn Rovers ===
Amoruso left Rangers in July 2003 to make a £1.4 million move to Blackburn Rovers, who wanted him as a replacement for Henning Berg. The sale was forced by Rangers' large debts. His Blackburn debut came on 16 August 2003, when he scored the opening goal of a 5–1 home win over promoted Wolverhampton Wanderers. In October, he was ruled out following a knee operation. As he returned and came into the team on a sporadic basis playing only eighteen times for Blackburn. His 2004–05 season was marred by regular injuries and he did not play any part of the 2005–06 season. He was released by Rovers in the summer of 2006.

In January 2008, Amoruso briefly came out of retirement to sign for Cosmos of San Marino on a part-time basis.

== International career ==
Amoruso represented Italy at the 1987 FIFA U-16 World Championship and won two caps at Under-21 level.

He was never selected by Italy at full international level, which Amoruso attributed to a "strange mentality" pervading his homeland. He blamed Giovanni Trapattoni, Cesare Maldini and Dino Zoff for failing to provide him with the call-up he felt he deserved. In 2020, he reiterated his view that moving to Rangers cost him the chance to play for Italy.

In 2004 Amoruso expressed a desire to play for Scotland, through residency. He said: "I began to feel like part of me was Scottish."

== After retirement ==
On 15 September 2010, Amoruso was hired by his former club Fiorentina as a scout for the first team. After almost two years with the club, he stepped down from his role. He is now a commentator on Serie A games for international audiences for example StarZ / Abu Dhabi Sports TV.

== Honours ==
Bari

- Mitropa Cup: 1990

Fiorentina

- Coppa Italia: 1995–96
- Supercoppa Italiana: 1996

Rangers

- Scottish Premier League: 1998–99, 1999–2000, 2002–03
- Scottish Cup: 1998–99, 2001–02, 2002–03
- Scottish League Cup: 1998–99, 2001–02, 2002–03

Individual

- Scottish Premier League Player of the Month: January 2002
- SPFA Players' Player of the Year: 2001–02
- Rangers F.C. – Hall of Fame
