= 2002–03 Scottish Premier League =

97th season of top-tier football league in Scotland

Scottish Premier League
- Season: 2002–03
- Dates: 3 August 2002 – 25 May 2003
- Champions: Rangers; 3rd Premier League title 50th Scottish title
- Relegated: No relegation
- Champions League: Rangers; Celtic
- UEFA Cup: Heart of Midlothian; Dundee
- Top goalscorer: Henrik Larsson (28)
- Biggest home win: Celtic 7–0 Aberdeen (3 November)
- Biggest away win: Dunfermline 0–6 Rangers (1 September)
- Highest attendance: 59,027 – Celtic v Rangers (6 October)
- Lowest attendance: 3,541 – Partick Thistle v Livingston (28 January)

The 2002–03 Scottish Premier League (known as the 2002–03 Bank of Scotland Premier League for sponsorship reasons) was the fifth season of the Scottish Premier League (SPL), the top level of football in Scotland. It began on 3 August 2002 and concluded on 25 May 2003.

Celtic were the defending champions, but were beaten to the title by Rangers on the final day of the season. This was Rangers' 50th Scottish league title. Both clubs went into the final matchday on the same number of points and with the same goal difference – Rangers were ahead in the table having scored more goals. On the final day, Rangers beat Dunfermline Athletic 6–1 at Ibrox Stadium while Celtic could only win 4–0 at Kilmarnock, meaning Rangers won the title by a goal difference of one more than Celtic. This was the closest finish in the history of the SPL.

== Changes from 2001–02 season ==
=== Broadcasting rights ===
Between 1998–99 and 2001–02, exclusive television rights for live Scottish Premier League matches were held by Sky Sports. In January 2002, the SPL rejected a £45 million offer from Sky Sports and began considering setting up its own pay-per-view channel, dubbed "SPL TV". However, these plans broke down in April 2002 when the Old Firm clubs – Rangers and Celtic – utilised the 11–1 voting system to veto the proposals. This caused discontent among the remaining ten SPL clubs, which subsequently announced their intention to resign from the league.

Despite a two-year television deal being agreed with BBC Scotland in July 2002 for a significant amount less than previously offered by Sky Sports, the ten non-Old Firm clubs confirmed their resignation from the SPL in August 2002, citing discontent with the voting system. The ten clubs withdrew their resignations in January 2003 after an agreement was reached to change some of the voting procedures and to change the distribution of TV revenue.

The withdrawal of Sky Sports' interest in the league caused several clubs to experience financial problems, with Hearts and Kilmarnock announcing debts of £3.8 million and £3.5 million, respectively, and Rangers' debt reportedly rising to £77 million.

Motherwell seemed to be affected immediately by the lack of income, entering this season in administration and releasing 19 of their playing staff at the end of the previous season.

=== European berths ===
Results in European competition over the previous five years saw the league move up from 16th to 12th in the UEFA country coefficient ranking. This meant that the league earned a second berth in the UEFA Champions League qualifying rounds for the following season.

== Teams ==
Twelve clubs would compete in the league this season – the top 11 clubs of the previous season, and the champions of the 2001–02 First Division.

St Johnstone were relegated to the First Division after five seasons in the top league on 6 April 2002, a draw with Motherwell leaving them 14 points adrift at the bottom with only 4 matches left to play.

They were replaced by Partick Thistle, the champions of the First Division. They secured their second successive promotion and a place in the top flight with a victory over St Mirren on 13 April 2002. This would be their debut season in the SPL and their first season in the top league since the 1995–96 season.

=== Stadia and locations ===
Aberdeen	Celtic	Dundee	Dundee United
Pittodrie Stadium	Celtic Park	Dens Park	Tannadice Park
Capacity: 20,866	Capacity: 60,832	Capacity: 11,506	Capacity: 14,223
Dunfermline Athletic	Location of teams in 2002–03 Scottish Premier League		Heart of Midlothian
East End Park	Location of teams in 2002–03 Scottish Premier League		Tynecastle Park
Capacity: 12,509	Location of teams in 2002–03 Scottish Premier League		Capacity: 17,420
Hibernian	Location of teams in 2002–03 Scottish Premier League		Kilmarnock
Easter Road	Location of teams in 2002–03 Scottish Premier League		Rugby Park
Capacity: 16,531	Location of teams in 2002–03 Scottish Premier League		Capacity: 17,889
Livingston	Motherwell	Partick Thistle	Rangers
Almondvale Stadium	Fir Park	Firhill Stadium	Ibrox Stadium
Capacity: 10,016	Capacity: 13,677	Capacity: 13,300	Capacity: 50,817

=== Personnel and kits ===
Team	Manager	Kit manufacturer	Kit sponsor
Aberdeen	(Scotland) Steve Paterson	Le Coq Sportif	A-Fab
Celtic	(Northern Ireland) Martin O'Neill	Umbro	ntl:
Dundee	(Scotland) Jim Duffy	360	jsearch.co.uk
Dundee United	(Scotland) Ian McCall	TFG Sports	Telewest
Dunfermline Athletic	(Scotland) Jimmy Calderwood	TFG Sports	RAC Auto Windscreens
Heart of Midlothian	(Scotland) Craig Levein	Reebok	All:sports
Hibernian	(Scotland) Bobby Williamson	Le Coq Sportif	Carlsberg
Kilmarnock	(Scotland) Jim Jefferies	TFG Sports	Seriously Strong Cheddar
Livingston	(Scotland) Jim Leishman	Jerzeez	Intelligent Finance
Motherwell	(England) Terry Butcher	Xara	The Untouchables
Partick Thistle	(Scotland) John Lambie	TFG Sports	DH Morris Group
Rangers	(Scotland) Alex McLeish	Diadora	ntl:home

==== Managerial changes ====
Team	Outgoing manager	Date of vacancy	Manner of departure	Position in table	Incoming manager	Date of appointment
Dundee	(Italy) Ivano Bonetti	2 July 2002	Sacked	Pre-season	(Scotland) Jim Duffy	4 July 2002
Dundee United	(Scotland) Alex Smith	7 October 2002	Sacked	11th	(Scotland) Paul Hegarty	5 November 2002
Aberdeen	(Denmark) Ebbe Skovdahl	29 November 2002	Resigned	8th	(Scotland) Steve Paterson	11 December 2002
Dundee United	(Scotland) Paul Hegarty	30 January 2003	Sacked	12th	(Scotland) Ian McCall	30 January 2003

== Overview ==
2002–03 was a successful season for Rangers, who won a domestic treble. They and Celtic competed in a very closely fought title race. Rangers were five points clear of Celtic at the time of the split, but a Celtic victory in the Old Firm derby and Rangers dropping further points against Dundee in the following match left the rivals level on points and on goal difference going into the final day of the season; Rangers were only ahead having scored 95 goals to Celtic's 94. On the final day, Rangers beat Dunfermline Athletic 6–1 at Ibrox Stadium while Celtic could only win 4–0 at Kilmarnock, meaning Rangers won the title by a goal difference of one more than Celtic (a stoppage-time penalty made the outcome more secure for Rangers – they would still have won at 5–1 by the margin of two more goals scored, but until that point Celtic would have claimed the title by goal difference had they scored again). This was the closest finish in the history of the SPL. Celtic striker Chris Sutton sparked controversy by accusing the Dunfermline players of "lying down" to allow Rangers to win the title, a comment which sparked a furious response and the threat of legal action from Dunfermline. Celtic had a more successful season in Europe, reaching the 2003 UEFA Cup Final, but eventually lost to Porto after extra-time in Seville, just four days before the final match of the league season. However, it would ultimately be the first season of Martin O'Neill's reign which ended without a trophy for Celtic.

Hearts qualified for the 2003–04 UEFA Cup after finishing third in the league, but finished 34 points behind the Old Firm. Dundee also qualified for the UEFA Cup in Jim Duffy's first season in charge by reaching the 2003 Scottish Cup Final, despite losing the final to Rangers.

In the bottom half of the table, Eddie Thompson took over as chairman of Dundee United but it would statistically be the club's worst season since World War II at that point, with the team finishing 11th in the league, and sacking two managers. They spent the season in a battle with Motherwell to avoid finishing bottom of the league. Following their entry into administration at the end of the previous season, Motherwell released 19 players before this season and struggled throughout the season, eventually being confirmed as the bottom team on 17 May 2003, following a 3–2 defeat to Aberdeen.

Falkirk became champions of the First Division in April 2003, but their Brockville Park stadium did not have the SPL minimum required 10,000 seats, a problem which prevented their possible promotion to the league only three seasons earlier. With plans to demolish the stadium and build a new stadium, Falkirk proposed a ground-share of Airdrie United's Excelsior Stadium. On 23 May 2003, the twelve members of the SPL voted against admitting Falkirk to the league. After a lengthy appeals process with the Scottish Football Association, including a situation where the following season's fixture list was released and the draw for the 2003–04 Scottish Challenge Cup was made without knowing all of the participants (the fixture list and cup draw referring to Motherwell or Falkirk's place as "Club X"), it was confirmed that Falkirk would not be accepted into the SPL, sparing Motherwell from relegation.

== Format ==
In the initial phase of the season, each of the twelve teams play the other eleven teams three times. After 33 rounds, the league splits into two sections, a top six and a bottom six, with each team playing all the other teams in their section once. The league attempts to balance the fixture list so that teams in the same section have played each other twice at home and twice away, but sometimes this is impossible. A total of 228 matches will be played, with 38 matches played by each team.

== League table ==
Pos	Team	Pld	W	D	L	GF	GA	GD	Pts	Qualification or relegation (Note: Teams played each other three times (33 matches), before the league split into two groups (the top six and the bottom six) for the last five matches.)
1	Rangers (C)	38	31	4	3	101	28	+73	97	Qualification for the Champions League third qualifying round
2	Celtic	38	31	4	3	98	26	+72	97	Qualification for the Champions League second qualifying round
3	Heart of Midlothian	38	18	9	11	57	51	+6	63	Qualification for the UEFA Cup first round
4	Kilmarnock	38	16	9	13	47	56	−9	57	
5	Dunfermline Athletic	38	13	7	18	54	71	−17	46	
6	Dundee	38	10	14	14	50	60	−10	44	Qualification for the UEFA Cup first round (Note: As Rangers, the 2002–03 Scottish Cup winners, qualified for the UEFA Champions League via their league position, the place in the UEFA Cup was passed onto Dundee, the cup runners-up)
7	Hibernian	38	15	6	17	56	64	−8	51	
8	Aberdeen	38	13	10	15	41	54	−13	49	
9	Livingston	38	9	8	21	48	62	−14	35	
10	Partick Thistle	38	8	11	19	37	58	−21	35	
11	Dundee United	38	7	11	20	35	68	−33	32	
12	Motherwell	38	7	7	24	45	71	−26	28	Spared from relegation (Note: As the First Division champions Falkirk did not have a suitable ground for the SPL, bottom club Motherwell were spared from relegation.)

Source: Scottish Professional Football League
Rules for classification: 1) Points; 2) Goal difference; 3) Goals scored
(C) Champions

== Results ==
=== Matches 1–22 ===
During matches 1–22 each team played every other team twice (home and away).

Home \ Away	ABE	CEL	DND	DUN	DNF	HOM	HIB	KIL	LIV	MOT	PAR	RAN
Aberdeen		0–4	0–0	1–2	3–1	1–1	0–1	0–1	0–0	1–1	0–1	2–2
Celtic	7–0		2–0	5–0	2–1	4–2	1–0	5–0	2–0	3–1	4–0	3–3
Dundee	1–2	0–1		3–2	2–3	1–1	2–1	2–1	2–1	1–1	4–1	0–3
Dundee United	1–1	0–2	0–0		1–2	0–3	1–1	1–2	2–3	1–1	1–1	0–3
Dunfermline Athletic	3–0	1–4	4–2	4–1		3–1	1–1	0–2	2–1	1–0	4–1	0–6
Heart of Midlothian	0–0	1–4	1–2	2–0	2–0		5–1	1–1	2–1	4–2	1–0	0–4
Hibernian	1–2	0–1	2–1	2–1	1–4	1–2		2–0	1–0	3–1	1–1	2–4
Kilmarnock	2–2	1–1	2–0	1–2	2–2	0–1	2–1		2–0	0–3	1–0	1–1
Livingston	1–2	0–2	1–1	3–0	1–1	1–1	1–2	0–1		3–2	3–0	0–2
Motherwell	1–2	2–1	1–1	1–2	2–1	6–1	0–2	0–1	1–5		1–1	1–0
Partick Thistle	2–1	0–1	1–1	0–0	4–0	2–2	0–3	3–0	2–2	2–0		1–2
Rangers	2–0	3–2	3–0	3–0	3–0	2–0	2–1	6–1	4–3	3–0	3–0	

Legend: Blue = home team win; Yellow = draw; Red = away team win.

=== Matches 23–33 ===
During matches 23–33 each team played every other team once (either at home or away).

Home \ Away	ABE	CEL	DND	DUN	DNF	HOM	HIB	KIL	LIV	MOT	PAR	RAN
Aberdeen		1–1	3–3	3–0	1–0	0–1					0–1	
Celtic				2–0	1–0		3–2	2–0	2–1			1–0
Dundee		1–1				1–2	3–0	2–2	0–0			
Dundee United			1–1		3–0			2–2	0–1	2–1		1–4
Dunfermline Athletic			0–1						2–0	3–0	0–0	1–3
Heart of Midlothian		2–1		2–1	3–0		4–4	3–0		2–1		
Hibernian	2–0			1–1	1–3				2–2			0–2
Kilmarnock	2–0				1–1		6–2			1–0	1–0	0–1
Livingston	1–2					1–1		0–4		1–0		1–2
Motherwell	0–1	0–4	1–2				2–1				2–2	
Partick Thistle		0–2	1–3	0–0		1–1	0–1		1–3			
Rangers	2–1		3–1			1–0				2–0	2–0	

Legend: Blue = home team win; Yellow = draw; Red = away team win.

=== Matches 34–38 ===
During matches 34–38 each team played every other team in their half of the table once.

==== Top six ====
Home \ Away	CEL	DND	DNF	HOM	KIL	RAN
Celtic		6–2		1–0		
Dundee			2–2		0–1	2–2
Dunfermline Athletic	1–4			0–1	2–2	
Heart of Midlothian		1–0				0–2
Kilmarnock	0–4			1–0		
Rangers	1–2		6–1		4–0	

Legend: Blue = home team win; Yellow = draw; Red = away team win.

==== Bottom six ====
Home \ Away	ABE	DUN	HIB	LIV	MOT	PAR
Aberdeen				1–0		2–1
Dundee United	0–2		1–2			
Hibernian	3–1				1–0	2–3
Livingston		1–2	1–2			3–1
Motherwell	2–3	2–2		6–2		
Partick Thistle		0–1			3–0	

Legend: Blue = home team win; Yellow = draw; Red = away team win.

== Top scorers ==
Player	Club	Goals
(Sweden) Henrik Larsson	Celtic	28
(Scotland) Stevie Crawford	Dunfermline Athletic	19
(Wales) John Hartson	Celtic	18
(Netherlands) Ronald de Boer	Rangers	16
(Scotland) Alex Burns	Partick Thistle	16
(Scotland) Barry Ferguson	Rangers	16
(England) Chris Sutton	Celtic	15
(Georgia (country)) Shota Arveladze	Rangers	15
(Suriname) Mark de Vries	Hearts	15
(Netherlands) Michael Mols	Rangers	13
(Scotland) James McFadden	Motherwell	13

Source: SPL official website

== Attendances ==
The average attendances for SPL clubs during the 2002/03 season are shown below:

Team	Average
Celtic	57,471
Rangers	48,814
Hearts	12,057
Aberdeen	11,774
Hibernian	10,157
Dundee United	7,665
Kilmarnock	7,407
Dundee	7,399
Livingston	6,663
Dunfermline Athletic	6,124
Motherwell	6,085
Partick Thistle	5,657

Source: SPL official website

== Awards ==
=== Monthly awards ===
Month	Manager	Player	Young Player
August	(Scotland) John Lambie (Partick Thistle)	(Netherlands) Mark de Vries (Hearts)	(Scotland) Kris Boyd (Kilmarnock)
September	(Scotland) Alex McLeish (Rangers)	(France) Jean-Louis Valois (Hearts)	(Spain) Mikel Arteta (Rangers)
October	(Scotland) Bobby Williamson (Hibernian)	(Netherlands) Fernando Ricksen (Rangers)	(Scotland) Ian Murray (Hibernian)
November	(Northern Ireland) Martin O'Neill (Celtic)	(Sweden) Henrik Larsson (Celtic)	(Scotland) Mark Wilson (Dundee United)
December	(Scotland) Jim Jefferies (Kilmarnock)	(Wales) John Hartson (Celtic)	(Scotland) Shaun Dillon (Kilmarnock)
January	(Scotland) Jim Duffy (Dundee)	(Scotland) Barry Ferguson (Rangers)	(Scotland) Kris Boyd (Kilmarnock)
February	(Scotland) Alex McLeish (Rangers)	(Scotland) Lee Wilkie (Dundee)	(Scotland) Shaun Maloney (Celtic)
March	(Scotland) Jim Duffy (Dundee)	(Scotland) Thomas McManus (Hibernian)	(Georgia (country)) Zurab Khizanishvili (Dundee)
April	(Scotland) Craig Levein (Hearts)	(Guinea) Bobo Baldé (Celtic)	(Scotland) Andy Webster (Hearts)

=== Annual awards ===
- Player awards

Award	Winner	Club
PFA Players' Player of the Year	(Scotland) Barry Ferguson	Rangers
PFA Young Player of the Year	(Scotland) James McFadden	Motherwell
SFWA Footballer of the Year	(Scotland) Barry Ferguson	Rangers
SFWA Young Player of the Year	(Georgia (country)) Zurab Khizanishvili	Dundee

- Manager awards

Award	Winner	Club
SFWA Manager of the Year	(Scotland) Alex McLeish	Rangers
