= Juan Sara =

Argentine-Italian footballer and coach

Personal information
- Full name: Juan Manuel Sara
- Date of birth: 13 October 1976 (age 50)
- Place of birth: Buenos Aires, Argentina
- Height: 1.87 m (6 ft 2 in)
- Position: Striker

Team information
- Current team: Ferro Carril Oeste (manager)

Youth career
- Almirante Brown

Senior career*
Years	Team	Apps	(Gls)
1993–1997	Almirante Brown	30	(3)
1997–1998	Nueva Chicago	15	(4)
1998–1999	FC Hradec Králové	7	(0)
1999–2000	Cerro Porteño	34	(14)
2000–2003	Dundee	88	(28)
2003	→ Coventry City (loan)	3	(1)
2004	Reggiana	2	(0)
2004–2005	Shelbourne	0	(0)
2005	Huracán	2	(0)
2006	Vaduz	30	(21)
2007	Gallipoli	2	(0)
2007	Lucena	6	(2)
2008	Locarno	24	(17)
2009	Cerro Porteño	7	(1)
2010	→ River Plate Puerto Rico (loan)	2	(4)
2010–2011	Lobos de la BUAP	32	(22)
2011–2012	Correcaminos UAT	27	(11)
2012–2013	Ferro Carril Oeste	6	(2)
Total		317	(130)

Managerial career
- 2015–2016: Club Atlético Ituzaingó (assistant)
- 2016–2017: Cañuelas (assistant)
- 2018: Comunicaciones (assistant)
- 2018: Midland (assistant)
- 2018–2020: Estudiantes BA (assistant)
- 2020: Godoy Cruz (assistant)
- 2021: Tigre (assistant)
- 2021–2022: Deportivo Maipú
- 2022–2023: Ferro Carril Oeste
- 2023: Estudiantes BA
- 2023: Tigre
- 2024–2025: Deportivo Maipú
- 2025–2026: Estudiantes BA
- 2026–: Ferro Carril Oeste
- * Club domestic league appearances and goals

Juan Manuel Sara (born 13 October 1976) is an Argentine football manager and former player who manages Primera Nacional club Ferro Carril Oeste. He also holds Italian nationality.

== Playing career ==
Sara was born in Buenos Aires. He played for Argentine side Almirante Brown and Nueva Chicago, Czech side Hradec Králové, Paraguayan side Cerro Porteño before move to Scotland.

Sara moved to Scottish side Dundee in 2000. Sara played 88 league matches during his three and a half years with the Dark Blues but left in November 2003 due to Dundee's threat of administration. He previously had a short loan spell with Coventry City, where he scored once against Nottingham Forest.

Sara moved on to Reggiana in December 2003. Sara played the rest of that season before joining Irish side Shelbourne in August 2004, where he played for a year. In July 2005, Sara moved back to his homeland with Huracán but stayed for only a few months, joining Liechtensteiner side Vaduz in January 2006. After a year with them, Sara moved to Italy with Gallipoli, again spending only a few months before his departure in June 2007. Sara joined Lucena shortly afterwards, then returned to Challenge League for Locarno. On 20 January 2009 joined to Cerro Porteño. In March 2010, he was loaned to River Plate Puerto Rico of the Puerto Rico Soccer League. He officially retired from playing in 2014.

== Coaching career ==
Sara entered coaching in 2015 with Club Atlético Ituzaingó under manager Diego Martínez, before leaving the following year with Martínez and his coaching team to Cañuelas. In 2018, Sara again followed Martínez to Estudiantes de Buenos Aires as assistant coach. He would later follow Martínez in roles at Godoy Cruz in 2020 and Club Atlético Tigre in 2021. While with El Matador, Sara helped the club win the 2021 Primera Nacional and achieve promotion to the Argentine Primera División. In December 2021, Sara would leave Martínez and was named manager of Primera Nacional side Deportivo Maipú. At the end of the season, Sara became manager of his final club as a player and fellow Primera Nacional side Ferro Carril Oeste.

== Miscellany ==
In 2001 Sara attended a recording session to provide a reading of The Serenity Prayer which was used as a basis for the track Sara's Song (I Thank God) as part of the album It's My Dundee to provide funds for the Dundee F.C. youth development fund.

== Personal life ==
Sara is a devout Christian.
