= 2002–03 Scottish Cup =

2002–03 Tennent's Scottish Cup
Tournament details
- Country: Scotland

Final positions
- Champions: Rangers
- Runners-up: Dundee

The 2002–03 Scottish Cup was the 118th staging of Scotland's most prestigious football knockout competition, also known for sponsorship reasons as the Tennent's Scottish Cup. The Cup was won by Rangers who defeated Dundee in the final.

== First round ==
Home team	Score	Away team
East Stirlingshire	1 – 1	Threave Rovers
Forfar Athletic	3 – 1	Huntly
Montrose	2 – 1	Berwick Rangers
Preston Athletic	0 – 1	Hamilton Academical
Raith Rovers	1 – 0	Dumbarton
Selkirk	1 – 4	Cowdenbeath
Stenhousemuir	4 – 1	Brechin City
Stranraer	1 – 1	Whitehill Welfare

=== Replays ===
Home team	Score	Away team
Threave Rovers	2 – 1	East Stirlingshire
Whitehill Welfare	2 – 3	Stranraer

== Second round ==
Home team	Score	Away team
Airdrie United	1 – 0	Threave Rovers
Forfar Athletic	3 – 1	Stenhousemuir
Greenock Morton	4 – 3	Deveronvale
Gretna	3 – 0	Cove Rangers
Hamilton Academical	1 – 1	East Fife
Keith	1 – 3	Cowdenbeath
Peterhead	1 – 0	Elgin City
Queen’s Park	1 – 1	Albion Rovers
Raith Rovers	3 – 1	Montrose
Stranraer	4 – 1	Stirling Albion

=== Replays ===
Home team	Score	Away team
Albion Rovers	0 – 2	Queen’s Park
East Fife	2 – 2 (3 – 5 pen)	Hamilton Academical

== Third round ==
Home team	Score	Away team
Airdrie United	1 – 1	St Johnstone
Arbroath	0 – 3	Rangers
Ayr United	2 – 0	Peterhead
Celtic	3 – 0	St Mirren
Cowdenbeath	2 – 3	Alloa Athletic
Dundee United	2 – 3	Hibernian
Falkirk	4 – 0	Hearts
Forfar Athletic	2 – 2	Stranraer
Gretna	1 – 2	Clyde
Inverness CT	2 – 0	Raith Rovers
Kilmarnock	0 – 1	Motherwell
Livingston	1 – 1	Dunfermline Athletic
Partick Thistle	0 – 2	Dundee
Queen of the South	0 – 0	Aberdeen
Queen’s Park	2 – 2	Hamilton Academical
Ross County	1 – 2	Greenock Morton

=== Replays ===
Home team	Score	Away team
Aberdeen	4 – 1	Queen of the South
Dunfermline Athletic	2 – 0	Livingston
Hamilton Academical	3 – 2	Queen’s Park
St Johnstone	1 – 1 (4 – 2 pen.)	Airdrie United
Stranraer	1 – 0	Forfar Athletic

== Fourth round ==
Home team	Score	Away team
Celtic	3 – 0	St Johnstone
Alloa Athletic	0 – 2	Falkirk
Ayr United	0 – 1	Rangers
Clyde	0 – 2	Motherwell
Dundee	2 – 0	Aberdeen
Dunfermline Athletic	1 – 1	Hibernian
Inverness CT	6 – 1	Hamilton Academical
Greenock Morton	0 – 2	Stranraer

=== Replays ===
Home team	Score	Away team
Hibernian	0 – 2	Dunfermline Athletic

== Quarter-finals ==
Home team	Score	Away team
Dunfermline Athletic	1 – 1	Rangers
Falkirk	1 – 1	Dundee
Inverness CT	1 – 0	Celtic
Stranraer	0 – 4	Motherwell

=== Replays ===
Home team	Score	Away team
Dundee	4 – 1	Falkirk
Rangers	3 – 0	Dunfermline Athletic

== Semi-finals ==
19 April 2003

Rangers	4–3	Motherwell
Konterman 2'; Mols 56'; Amoruso 60'; Partridge 73' (o.g.)	Report	Craig 15'; McFadden 27'; Adams 90'

Hampden Park, Glasgow
Attendance: 29,352
Referee: Mike McCurry

20 April 2003

Inverness CT	0–1	Dundee
	Report	Nemsadze 78'

Hampden Park, Glasgow
Attendance: 14,429
Referee: Dougie McDonald

== Final ==
31 May 2003

Dundee	0–1	Rangers
	Report	Amoruso 66'

Hampden Park, Glasgow
Attendance: 47,136
Referee: Kenny Clark

== Largest Wins ==
A list of the largest wins from the competition.

Score	Home team	Away team	Stage
6-1	Inverness Caledonian Thistle	Hamilton Academical	Fourth Round
4-0	Falkirk	Hearts	Third Round
0-4	Stranraer	Motherwell	Quarter-finals
