= 1997–98 Heart of Midlothian F.C. season =

Heart of Midlothian
1997–98 season
- Manager: Jim Jefferies
- Stadium: Tynecastle Stadium
- Scottish Premier Division: 3rd
- Scottish Cup: Winner
- League Cup: Quarter-final
- Top goalscorer: League: Jim Hamilton (14); All: Jim Hamilton (15)
- Highest home attendance: 17,657 v Celtic Scottish Premier Division 8 February 1998
- Lowest home attendance: 12,367 v Aberdeen Scottish Premier Division 16 August 1997
- Average home league attendance: 15,337

The 1997–98 season was Heart of Midlothian F.C.'s 15th consecutive season of play in the Scottish Premier Division. Hearts also competed in the Scottish Cup and the Scottish League Cup.

== Fixtures ==
=== Friendlies ===
| 16 July 1997 Friendly | Blyth Spartans | 0–0 | Hearts | Croft Park |
| | | | | Attendance: 800 |

| 18 July 1997 Friendly | Hull City | 2–3 | Hearts | Boothferry Park |
| | Goal | | Salvatori Flogel Hamilton | Attendance: 3,471 |

| 20 July 1997 Friendly | Berwick Rangers | 0–3 | Hearts | Shielfield Park |
| | | | Robertson Hamilton | Attendance: 1,754 |

| 29 July 1997 Friendly | Grimsby Town | 2–0 | Hearts | Blundell Park |
| | Goal | | | Attendance: 6,348 |

=== Scottish Premier Division ===
| 4 August 1997 Scottish Premier Division | Rangers | 3–1 | Hearts | Ibrox |
| | Negri 39', 40' Cleland 85' | | Cameron 88' | Attendance: 48,257; Referee: Stuart Dougal |

| 16 August 1997 Scottish Premier Division | Hearts | 4–1 | Aberdeen | Tynecastle Stadium |
| | John Robertson 36' (pen.) Fulton 38' Cameron 42' Flogel 89' | | Newell 12' | Attendance: 12,367; Referee: George Clyde |

| 23 August 1997 Scottish Premier Division | Dunfermline Athletic | 2–1 | Hearts | East End Park |
| | Smith 57' Tod 68' | | Hamilton 90+1' | Attendance: 8,823; Referee: S Roy |

| 30 August 1997 Scottish Premier Division | Hibs | 0–1 | Hearts | Easter Road |
| | | | McCann 7' | Attendance: 15,565; Referee: Hugh Dallas |

| 13 September 1997 Scottish Premier Division | St Johnstone | 1–2 | Hearts | McDiarmid Park |
| | Tosh 70' | | Hamilton 19' (65) | Attendance: 5,836; Referee: Garry Mitchell |

| 20 September 1997 Scottish Premier Division | Hearts | 2–1 | Dundee United | Tynecastle Stadium |
| | Pressley 44' (og.) John Robertson 60' | | Olafsson 45' | Attendance: 13,515; Referee: Hugh Dallas |

| 27 September 1997 Scottish Premier Division | Kilmarnock | 0–3 | Hearts | Rugby Park |
| | | | Weir 6' Hamilton 14' Adam 43' | Attendance: 7,875; Referee: Kenny Clark |

| 4 October 1997 Scottish Premier Division | Motherwell | 1–4 | Hearts | Fir Park |
| | Coyne 45' (pen.) | | Cameron 6' Adam 13' McCann 20' Hamilton 71' | Attendance: 8,886; Referee: Jim McCluskey |

| 18 October 1997 Scottish Premier Division | Hearts | 1–2 | Celtic | Tynecastle Stadium |
| | Cameron 65' | | Reiper 17' Larsson 21' | Attendance: 16,977; Referee: John Rowbotham |

| 29 October 1997 Scottish Premier Division | Hearts | 3–1 | Dunfermline Athletic | Tynecastle Stadium |
| | McCann 13' Adam 73' Fulton 90' | | Smith 76' | Attendance: 14,493; Referee: J Fleming |

| 1 November 1997 Scottish Premier Division | Aberdeen | 1–4 | Hearts | Pittodrie |
| | Windass 22' | | McCann 54' Flogel 65' (82) Robertson 76' | Attendance: 15,097; Referee: Jim McCluskey |

| 8 November 1997 Scottish Premier Division | Hearts | 2–0 | Hibs | Tynecastle Stadium |
| | Robertson 17' Quitongo 88' | | | Attendance: 16,739; Referee: Mike McCurry |

| 15 November 1997 Scottish Premier Division | Hearts | 2–0 | St Johnstone | Tynecastle Stadium |
| | Flogel 48' Cameron 90' (pen.) | | O'Boyle 77' | Attendance: 13,611; Referee: Stuart Dougal |

| 23 November 1997 Scottish Premier Division | Hearts | 5–3 | Kilmarnock | Tynecastle Stadium |
| | McCann 10' Adam 28' (61), 70' Quitongo 88' | | Nevin 5' Holt 62' Roberts 76' (pen.) | Attendance: 16,015; Referee: Alan Freeland |

| 6 December 1997 Scottish Premier Division | Hearts | 2–0 | Motherwell | Tynecastle Stadium |
| | Cameron 45' (pen.) Flogel 68' | | | Attendance: 12,706; Referee: George Clyde |

| 9 December 1997 Scottish Premier Division | Dundee United | 0–0 | Hearts | Tannadice Park |
| | | | | Attendance: 10,402; Referee: K Bisset |

| 13 December 1997 Scottish Premier Division | Celtic | 1–0 | Hearts | Celtic Park |
| | Burley 80' | | | Attendance: 49,806; Referee: Bobby Tait |

| 20 December 1997 Scottish Premier Division | Hearts | 2–5 | Rangers | Tynecastle Stadium |
| | Robertson 17' Hamilton 88' | | Durie 6,34,86' Negri 69' (pen.) Albertz 78' | Attendance: 17,092; Referee: Hugh Dallas |

| 27 December 1997 Scottish Premier Division | Dunfermline Athletic | 1–3 | Hearts | East End Park |
| | Bingham 16' (pen.) | | Hamilton 7' Westwater 28' (og.) Salvatori 33' | Attendance: 11,722; Referee: Hugh Dallas |

| 1 January 1998 Scottish Premier Division | Hearts | 2–2 | Hibs | Tynecastle Stadium |
| | Fulton 6' (10) | | Walker 51' Mcginlay 67' | Attendance: 17,564; Referee: Bobby Tait |

| 12 January 1998 Scottish Premier Division | St Johnstone | 2–3 | Hearts | McDiarmid Park |
| | Davidson 48' O’Boyle 63' (pen.) | | Hamilton 29' (70) Naysmith 36' | Attendance: 5,408; Referee: Mike McCurry |

| 17 January 1998 Scottish Premier Division | Kilmarnock | 2–2 | Hearts | Rugby Park |
| | Wright 40' Reilly 76' | | McCann 6' Mcpherson 45' (og.) | Attendance: 11,079; Referee: Dougie Smith |

| 31 January 1998 Scottish Premier Division | Hearts | 2–0 | Dundee United | Tynecastle Stadium |
| | Cameron 39' (40) | | | Attendance: 14,414; Referee: Willie Young |

| 8 February 1998 Scottish Premier Division | Hearts | 1–1 | Celtic | Tynecastle Stadium |
| | Quitongo 92' | | McNamara 40' | Attendance: 17,657; Referee: Bobby Tait |

| 21 February 1998 Scottish Premier Division | Motherwell | 2–4 | Hearts | Fir Park |
| | Coyle 6' Falconer 37' | | Hamilton 38' (58) Fulton 68' Adam 87' | Attendance: 8,375; Referee: J Fleming |

| 25 February 1998 Scottish Premier Division | Hearts | 3–1 | Aberdeen | Tynecastle Stadium |
| | Hamilton 2' Naysmith 63' McCann 77' | | Jess 61' | Attendance: 16,512; Referee: Garry Mitchell |

| 28 February 1998 Scottish Premier Division | Rangers | 2–2 | Hearts | Ibrox |
| | Albertz 40' (92) | | McCann 31' Hamilton 76' | Attendance: 50,046; Referee: Kenny Clark |

| 14 March 1998 Scottish Premier Division | Hearts | 1–1 | Kilmarnock | Tynecastle Stadium |
| | Macpherson 23' | | Heny 34' | Attendance: 15,338; Referee: Willie Young |

| 21 March 1998 Scottish Premier Division | Dundee United | 0–1 | Hearts | Tannadice Park |
| | | | Hamilton 8' | Attendance: 10,400; Referee: Alan Freeland |

| 28 March 1998 Scottish Premier Division | Celtic | 0–0 | Hearts | Celtic Park |
| | | | | Attendance: 49,978; Referee: Bobby Tait |

| 8 April 1998 Scottish Premier Division | Hearts | 1–1 | Motherwell | Tynecastle Stadium |
| | McCann 59' | | Coyne 79' | Attendance: 14,737 |

| 11 April 1998 Scottish Premier Division | Hibs | 2–1 | Hearts | Easter Road |
| | Lavety 56' Harper 80' | | Robertson 71' | Attendance: 15,530; Referee: Willie Young |

| 18 April 1998 Scottish Premier Division | Hearts | 1–1 | St Johnstone | Tynecastle Stadium |
| | Mcpherson 75' | | Grant 78' | Attendance: 15,034; Referee: Robert Orr |

| 25 April 1998 Scottish Premier Division | Hearts | 0–3 | Rangers | Tynecastle Stadium |
| | | | Gattoso 48' (78) Albertz 78' | Attendance: 17,415; Referee: Jim McCluskey |

| 2 May 1998 Scottish Premier Division | Aberdeen | 2–2 | Hearts | Pittodrie |
| | Jess 26' Newell 46' | | McCann 10' Mcpherson 29' | Attendance: 12,899; Referee: Eric Martindale |

| 9 May 1998 Scottish Premier Division | Hearts | 2–0 | Dunfermline Athletic | Tynecastle Stadium |
| | Mcpherson 83' Holmes 83' | | | Attendance: 13,888; Referee: Robert Orr |

=== Scottish League Cup ===
| 9 August 1997 League Cup R2 | Livingston | 0–2 | Hearts | Almondvale Stadium |
| | | | McCann 25' (26) | Attendance: 4,869 |

| 19 August 1997 League Cup R3 | Raith Rovers | 1–2 | Hearts | Stark's Park |
| | Wright 54' | | Weir 56' McCann 64' | Attendance: 7,146; Referee: Jim Herald |

| 9 September 1997 League Cup QF | Dunfermline | 1–0 (a.e.t.) | Hearts | East End Park |
| | Moore 114' | | | Attendance: 11,106; Referee: Mike McCurry |

=== Scottish Cup ===
| 24 January 1998 Scottish Cup R3 | Hearts | 2–0 | Clydebank | Tynecastle Stadium |
| | Flogel 31' Weir 61' | | | Attendance: 12,699; Referee: Mike McCurry |

| 14 February 1998 Scottish Cup R4 | Hearts | 3–0 | Albion Rovers | Tynecastle Stadium |
| | Quitongo 61' (88) Cameron 66' (pen.) | | | Attendance: 12,634; Referee: Alan Freeland |

| 7 March 1998 Scottish Cup QF | Hearts | 4–1 | Ayr United | Tynecastle Stadium |
| | Ritchie 9' Flogel 16' Fulton 65' Hamilton 82' | | Ferguson 19' | Attendance: 15,761; Referee: Stuart Dougal |

| 4 April 1998 Scottish Cup SF | Hearts | 3–1 | Falkirk | Ibrox |
| | Adam 5' (89) McCann 90' | | McAllister 85' | Attendance: 31,587; Referee: Hugh Dallas |

| 16 May 1998 Scottish Cup Final | Rangers | 1–2 | Hearts | Celtic Park |
| | McCoist 81' | | Cameron 2' (pen.) Adam 52' | Attendance: 48,946; Referee: Willie Young |

== Scottish Premier Division table ==
| Pos | Team | Pld | W | D | L | GF | GA | GD | Pts | Qualification or relegation |
|---|---|---|---|---|---|---|---|---|---|---|
| 1 | Celtic (C) | 36 | 22 | 8 | 6 | 64 | 24 | +40 | 74 | Qualification for the Champions League first qualifying round |
| 2 | Rangers | 36 | 21 | 9 | 6 | 76 | 38 | +38 | 72 | Qualification for the UEFA Cup first qualifying round |
| 3 | Heart of Midlothian | 36 | 19 | 10 | 7 | 70 | 46 | +24 | 67 | Qualification for the Cup Winners' Cup qualifying round |
| 4 | Kilmarnock | 36 | 13 | 11 | 12 | 40 | 52 | −12 | 50 | Qualification for the UEFA Cup first qualifying round |
| 5 | St Johnstone | 36 | 13 | 9 | 14 | 38 | 42 | −4 | 48 | |

Source: Rec.Sport.Soccer Statistics Foundation
Rules for classification: 1) Points; 2) Goal difference; 3) Goals scored
(C) Champions

== Stats ==
=== Scorers ===
| Pos | PLayer | SPL | SC | LC | Total |
|---|---|---|---|---|---|
| FW | (Scotland) Jim Hamilton | 14 | 1 | 0 | 15 |
| MF | (Scotland) Neil McCann | 10 | 1 | 3 | 14 |
| MF | (Scotland) Colin Cameron | 8 | 2 | 0 | 10 |
| FW | (France) Stephane Adam | 7 | 3 | 0 | 10 |
| MF | (Austria) Thomas Flogel | 5 | 2 | 0 | 7 |
| FW | (Scotland) John Robertson | 6 | 0 | 0 | 6 |
| MF | (Scotland) Steve Fulton | 5 | 1 | 0 | 6 |
| MF | (Angola) Jose Quitongo | 3 | 2 | 0 | 5 |
| DF | (Scotland) Dave McPherson | 4 | 0 | 0 | 4 |
| DF | (Scotland) David Weir | 1 | 1 | 1 | 3 |
| DF | (Scotland) Gary Naysmith | 2 | 0 | 0 | 2 |
| FW | (Scotland) Derek Holmes | 1 | 0 | 0 | 1 |
| MF | (Italy) Stefano Salvatori | 1 | 0 | 0 | 1 |
| DF | (Scotland) Paul Ritchie | 0 | 1 | 0 | 1 |

== See also ==
- List of Heart of Midlothian F.C. seasons
