= 1999–2000 Heart of Midlothian F.C. season =

Heart of Midlothian
1999–2000 season
- Manager: Jim Jefferies
- Stadium: Tynecastle Stadium
- Scottish Premier League: 3rd
- Scottish Cup: Quarter-finals
- League Cup: Quarter-finals
- Top goalscorer: League: Gary McSwegan (13); All: Gary McSwegan (15)
- Highest home attendance: 17,954 (vs. Hibs, SPL, 19 December 1999)
- Lowest home attendance: 10,598 (vs. Dundee United, SPL, 5 December 1999)
- Average home league attendance: 14,246

The 1999–2000 season was Heart of Midlothian F.C.'s 17th consecutive season in the top level of Scottish football, playing in the Scottish Premier League. Hearts also competed in the Scottish Cup and League Cup.

== Players ==
=== First-team squad ===
Squad at end of season

Note: Flags indicate national team as defined under FIFA eligibility rules; some limited exceptions apply. Players may hold more than one non-FIFA nationality.

No.	Pos.	Nation	Player
1	GK	FRA	Gilles Rousset
2	DF	SCO	Steven Pressley
3	DF	SCO	Gary Naysmith
4	MF	SCO	Gary Locke
5	DF	SCO	Kevin James
6	DF	SCO	Paul Ritchie
7	FW	SCO	Gary McSwegan
8	MF	SCO	Steve Fulton
9	FW	FRA	Stéphane Adam
10	MF	SCO	Colin Cameron
11	FW	SCO	Darren Jackson
12	DF	SCO	Grant Murray
13	GK	SCO	Roddy McKenzie
14	MF	AUT	Thomas Flögel
15	DF	YUG	Gordan Petrić
16	MF	ENG	Lee Makel
17	DF	SCO	Rob McKinnon
18	MF	JAM	Fitzroy Simpson (Note: Simpson was born in Bradford-on-Avon, England, but also qualified to represent Jamaica internationally and made his international debut for Jamaica in 1997.)
19	MF	WAL	Leigh Jenkinson (Note: Jenkinson was born in Thorne, England, but also qualified to represent Wales internationally and represented the Wales B team.)
20	MF	ESP	Juanjo

No.	Pos.	Nation	Player
21	MF	SVK	Róbert Tomaschek
22	DF	FRA	Fabien Leclercq
23	FW	SCO	Gary Wales
24	FW	NIR	Andy Kirk
25	DF	SCO	Robbie Horn
26	GK	FIN	Antti Niemi
27	MF	SCO	Scott Severin
28	DF	SCO	Kenny Milne
29	DF	SCO	Bobby Clyde
30	GK	SCO	Scott Strang
31	DF	SCO	Robbie Neilson
32	MF	SCO	Kris O'Neill
33	MF	SCO	Alisdair Graham
34	MF	SCO	Steven O'Donnell
35	DF	SCO	Craig Findlay
36			Graham Smith
37	GK	NOR	Roger Vaaler
40	DF	SCO	Darren Goldie
48			Steve Riley

=== Left club during season ===
Note: Flags indicate national team as defined under FIFA eligibility rules; some limited exceptions apply. Players may hold more than one non-FIFA nationality.

No.	Pos.	Nation	Player
6	DF	SCO	Paul Ritchie (to Bolton Wanderers)
15	MF	ANG	José Quitongo (to Hamilton Academical)
21	MF	ITA	Stefano Salvatori (to Alzano)

No.	Pos.	Nation	Player
26	FW	SCO	Derek Holmes (to Ross County)

== Fixtures ==
=== Pre-season friendlies ===
17 July 1999 Friendly	Queens Park	0–3	Hearts	Hampden Park
			McSwegan Adam Makel	Attendance: 1,027

19 July 1999 Friendly	Stirling Albion	0–6	Hearts	Forthbank Stadium
			Kirk Holmes Quitongo	Attendance: 641

21 July 1999 Friendly	Hearts	3–2	Fulham	Tynecastle Stadium
	Jackson 57' (61) Juanjo 73'		Horsfield 7' Collymore 18'	Attendance: 9,056; Referee: Dougie McDonald

24 July 1999 Friendly	Hearts	2–2	Tottenham Hotspur	Tynecastle Stadium
	Cameron 50' Makel 70'		Murray 36' Iversen 43'	Attendance: 9,710; Referee: Kevin Stott

2 August 1999 Friendly	Morton	0–4	Hearts	Cappielow Park
			Locke Horn Kirk Smith	Attendance: 251

=== League Cup ===
18 August 1999 League Cup R2	Queen of the South	1–3	Hearts	Palmerston Park
	Leslie 14'		Jackson 46' (85) Severin 70'	Attendance: 4,633; Referee: Hugh Dallas

12 October 1999 League Cup R3	East Fife	0–2	Hearts	Bayview Stadium
			Cameron 41' (pen.) Holmes 89'	Attendance: 3,337

2 February 2000 League Cup R3	Kilmarnock	1–0	Hearts	Rugby Park
	Jeffrey 77'			Attendance: 6,648; Referee: Willie Young

=== Scottish Cup ===
29 January 2000 Scottish Cup R3	Hearts	3–2	Stenhousemuir	Tynecastle Stadium
	Cameron 38' (pen.) McSwegan 61' (88)		Hamilton 8' Mooney 29'	Attendance: 11,752; Referee: Robert Orr

19 February 2000 Scottish Cup R4	Clyde	0–2	Hearts	Broadwood Stadium
			Jackson 1' Wales 7'	Attendance: 6,427; Referee: Stuart Dougal

12 March 2000 Scottish Cup QF	Rangers	4–1	Hearts	Ibrox
	Ferguson 12' Numan 17' Amoruso 69' Dodds 79' (pen.)		Cameron 35' (pen.)	Attendance: 31,471; Referee: Hugh Dallas

=== Scottish Premier League ===
31 July 1999 SPL	St Johnstone	1–4	Hearts	McDiarmid Park
	McQuillan 83'		McSwegan 30' Flögel 67' Dods 78' (og.) Cameron 80'	Attendance: 6,705; Referee: Willie Young

7 August 1999 SPL	Hearts	0–4	Rangers	Tynecastle Stadium
			Reyna 14' (73) Mols 45' Albertz 67'	Attendance: 17,893; Referee: John Rowbotham

14 August 1999 SPL	Hibs	1–1	Hearts	Easter Road
	Latapy 43' (pen.)		McSwegan 79'	Attendance: 16,976; Referee: Stuart Dougal

22 August 1999 SPL	Hearts	3–0	Aberdeen	Tynecastle Stadium
	McSwegan 44' (50), 85'			Attendance: 12,803; Referee: Mike McCurry

29 August 1999 SPL	Celtic	4–0	Hearts	Celtic Park
	Viduka 17' Larsson 36' Berkovic 70' (72)			Attendance: 59,697; Referee: Jim McCluskey

11 September 1999 SPL	Hearts	3–0	Dundee	Tynecastle Stadium
	Adam 7' Jackson 73' Cameron 75' Severin 81'			Attendance: 13,378; Referee: Kevin Toner

20 September 1999 SPL	Motherwell	1–0	Hearts	Fir Park
	Teale 24' (pen.)			Attendance: 7,500; Referee: John Rowbotham

25 September 1999 SPL	Dundee United	0–2	Hearts	Tannadice Park
			Adam 14' (89)	Attendance: 8,510; Referee: Mike McCurry

16 October 1999 SPL	Hearts	1–1	St Johnstone	Tynecastle Stadium
	McSwegan 7'		Lowndes 57'	Attendance: 12,872; Referee: Alan Freeland

27 October 1999 SPL	Hearts	2–2	Kilmarnock	Tynecastle Stadium
	Cameron 83' Juanjo 92'		MacPherson 64' Cocard 93'	Attendance: 12,541; Referee: Kenny Clark

30 October 1999 SPL	Dundee	1–0	Hearts	Dens Park
	Tweed 2'			Attendance: 6,018; Referee: Garry Mitchell

6 November 1999 SPL	Hearts	1–1	Motherwell	Tynecastle Stadium
	McSwegan 8'		Spencer 83'	Attendance: 12,514; Referee: Alan Freeland

20 November 1999 SPL	Hearts	1–2	Celtic	Tynecastle Stadium
	Cameron 3'		Wright 71' Moravcik 88'	Attendance: 17,184; Referee: Mike McCurry

23 November 1999 SPL	Motherwell	2–1	Hearts	Fir Park
	McCulloch 24' Nevin 90'		McSwegan 46'	Attendance: 6,018; Referee: John Rowbotham

27 November 1999 SPL	Kilmarnock	2–2	Hearts	Rugby Park
	Mahood 73' Reilly 92'		McSwegan 7' Ritchie 22'	Attendance: 8,326; Referee: Kenny Clark

5 December 1999 SPL	Hearts	3–0	Dundee United	Tynecastle Stadium
	Juanjo 4' Jackson 69' Adam 88'			Attendance: 10,598; Referee: Hugh Dallas

8 December 1999 SPL	Aberdeen	3–1	Hearts	Pittodrie
	Jess 9' Stavrum 63' Guntveit 65'		Severin 30'	Attendance: 10,274; Referee: Jim McCluskey

19 December 1999 SPL	Hearts	0–3	Hibs	Tynecastle Stadium
			Lehmann 18' Sauzee 27' Miller 90'	Attendance: 17,954; Referee: Willie Young

22 December 1999 SPL	Rangers	1–0	Hearts	Ibrox
	Albertz 90'			Attendance: 49,709; Referee: Stuart Dougal

22 January 2000 SPL	Hearts	2–0	Dundee	Tynecastle Stadium
	Wales 17' Jackson 50'			Attendance: 13,112; Referee: George Simpson

5 February 2000 SPL	Celtic	2–3	Hearts	Celtic Park
	Moravcik 18' Naysmith 55'		Cameron 31' (83), pen.' Viduka 28'	Attendance: 59,896; Referee: John Rowbotham

26 February 2000 SPL	Hearts	0–0	Kilmarnock	Tynecastle Stadium
				Attendance: 14,243; Referee: George Simpson

1 March 2000 SPL	Motherwell	0–2	Hearts	Fir Park
			Jackson 45' Wales 59'	Attendance: 5,558; Referee: Jim McCluskey

4 March 2000 SPL	Dundee United	0–1	Hearts	Tannadice Park
			Cameron 54' (pen.)	Attendance: 6,928; Referee: Kenny Clark

15 March 2000 SPL	St Johnstone	0–1	Hearts	McDiarmid Park
			McSwegan 64'	Attendance: 4,468; Referee: Stuart Dougal

18 March 2000 SPL	Hibs	3–1	Hearts	Easter Road
	Latapy 37' Sauzee 60' Paatelainen 85'		Jackson 26'	Attendance: 15,908; Referee: Hugh Dallas

22 March 2000 SPL	Hearts	3–0	Aberdeen	Tynecastle Stadium
	Cameron 9' Wales 47' Fulton 99'			Attendance: 13,249; Referee: Willie Young

25 March 2000 SPL	Hearts	0–0	Motherwell	Tynecastle Stadium
				Attendance: 13,102; Referee: Mike McCurry

1 April 2000 SPL	Dundee	0–0	Hearts	Dens Park
				Attendance: 6,291; Referee: Jim McCluskey

8 April 2000 SPL	Hearts	1–0	Celtic	Tynecastle Stadium
	McSwegan 36'			Attendance: 16,046; Referee: Hugh Dallas

12 April 2000 SPL	Hearts	1–2	Rangers	Tynecastle Stadium
	McSwegan 12'		Wallace 45' Dodds 64'	Attendance: 16,314; Referee: Willie Young

15 April 2000 SPL	Aberdeen	1–2	Hearts	Pittodrie
	Stavrum 13'		Wales 81' Jackson 84'	Attendance: 12,626; Referee: George Clyde

22 April 2000 SPL	Hearts	1–2	Dundee United	Tynecastle Stadium
	Wales 63'		Mathie 73' (87)	Attendance: 12,604; Referee: Robert Orr

29 April 2000 SPL	Kilmarnock	0–1	Hearts	Pittodrie
			Wales 53'	Attendance: 8,057; Referee: Stuart Dougal

6 May 2000 SPL	Hearts	0–0	St Johnstone	Tynecastle Stadium
				Attendance: 12,638; Referee: John Rowbotham

13 May 2000 SPL	Rangers	1–0	Hearts	Ibrox
	Dodds 22'			Attendance: 49,109; Referee: Kenny Clark

21 May 2000 SPL	Hearts	2–1	Hibs	Tynecastle Stadium
	Juanjo 30' McSwegan 62'		Paatelainen 57'	Attendance: 17,391; Referee: Hugh Dallas

== Final league table ==
Pos	Team	Pld	W	D	L	GF	GA	GD	Pts	Qualification or relegation
1	Rangers (C)	36	28	6	2	96	26	+70	90	Qualification for the Champions League second qualifying round
2	Celtic	36	21	6	9	90	38	+52	69	Qualification for the UEFA Cup qualifying round
3	Heart of Midlothian	36	15	9	12	47	40	+7	54	Qualification for the UEFA Cup qualifying round
4	Motherwell	36	14	10	12	49	63	−14	52	
5	St Johnstone	36	10	12	14	36	44	−8	42	

Updated to match(es) played on end of season. Source: Scottish Professional Football League
Rules for classification: 1) Points; 2) Goal difference; 3) Goals scored
(C) Champions

== Statistics ==
=== Scorers ===
Pos	PLayer	SPL	SC	LC	Total
FW	(Scotland) Gary McSwegan	13	2	0	15
MF	(Scotland) Colin Cameron	8	2	1	11
FW	(Scotland) Darren Jackson	6	1	2	9
FW	(Scotland) Gary Wales	6	1	0	7
FW	(France) Stéphane Adam	4	0	0	4
MF	(Spain) Juanjo	3	0	0	3
MF	(Scotland) Scott Severin	2	0	1	3
MF	(Austria) Thomas Flögel	1	0	0	1
MF	(Scotland) Steve Fulton	1	0	0	1
DF	(Scotland) Gary Naysmith	1	0	0	1
DF	(Scotland) Paul Ritchie	1	0	0	1
FW	(Scotland) Derek Holmes	0	0	1	1

== See also ==
- List of Heart of Midlothian F.C. seasons
