= 1998–99 Heart of Midlothian F.C. season =

Heart of Midlothian
1998–99 season
- Manager: Jim Jefferies
- Stadium: Tynecastle Stadium
- Scottish Premier League: 6th
- Uefa Cup Winners' Cup: 1st round
- Scottish Cup: 3rd round
- League Cup: Semi-final
- Top goalscorer: League: Stephane Adam (9); All: Jim Hamilton (10); Stephane Adam (10)
- Highest home attendance: 17,334 v Celtic SPL 6 December 1998
- Lowest home attendance: 12,323 v Motherwell SPL 23 September 1998
- Average home league attendance: 14,233

The 1998–99 season was Heart of Midlothian F.C.'s 16th consecutive season in the top level of Scottish football, the new Scottish Premier League, formed by the clubs from the previous season's Scottish Premier Division. Hearts also competed in the UEFA Cup Winners' Cup, Scottish Cup and League Cup.

== Fixtures ==
=== Friendlies ===
12 July 1998 Friendly	Bohemian	0–1	Hearts	Dalymount Park
			Quitongo	Attendance: 550

14 July 1998 Friendly	St Patricks Athletic	0–1	Hearts	Richmond Park
			S Carr [Carr]	Attendance: 1,900

18 July 1998 Friendly	East Stirlingshire	0–0	Hearts	Ochilview Park

20 July 1998 Friendly	Cowdenbeath	1–3	Hearts	Central Park
	Goal		Goal

21 July 1998 Friendly	Metz	1–0	Hearts	Stade Municipal
	Goal			Attendance: 2,050

23 July 1998 Friendly	Berwick Rangers	2–1	Hearts	Shielfield Park
	Goal		Goal

25 July 1998 Friendly	Hearts	1–0	Coventry City	Tynecastle Stadium
			McCann	Attendance: 6,000; Referee: Kenny Clark

27 July 1998 Friendly	Morton	4–3	Hearts	Cappielow Park
	Goal		Goal

30 July 1998 Friendly	Raith Rovers	4–2	Hearts	Stark's Park
	Goal		Goal

13 February 1999 Friendly	St Mirren	0–2	Hearts	Love Street
	Juanjo			Attendance: 500

15 February 1999 Friendly	Raith Rovers	0–3	Hearts	Stark's Park
			Hamilton	Attendance: 1,100

25 March 1999 Friendly	East Stirlingshire	2–3	Hearts	Ochilview Park
	Goal		Locke Fulton Quitongo	Attendance: 436

=== Scottish Premier League ===
2 August 1998 SPL	Hearts	2–1	Rangers	Tynecastle Stadium
	Adam 6' Hamilton 20'		Wallace 28'	Attendance: 15,272; Referee: Hugh Dallas

16 August 1998 SPL	Dundee United	0–0	Hearts	Tannadice Park
				Attendance: 9,629; Referee: Stuart Dougal

22 August 1998 SPL	Hearts	2–0	Aberdeen	Tynecastle Stadium
	Fulton 7' Pressley 11'			Attendance: 14,416; Referee: Jim McCluskey

30 August 1998 SPL	Kilmarnock	3–0	Hearts	Rugby Park
	McCoist 8', 61', 86'			Attendance: 10,376; Referee: Willie Young

12 September 1998 SPL	Hearts	0–2	Dundee	Tynecastle Stadium
			Adamczuk 48', 82'	Attendance: 13,117; Referee: Alan Freeland

20 September 1998 SPL	Dunfermline Athletic	1–1	Hearts	East End Park
	Hamilton 58'		Smith 12'	Attendance: 5,963; Referee: Mike McCurry

23 September 1998 SPL	Hearts	3–0	Motherwell	Tynecastle Stadium
	Weir 71' McCann 87' (pen.), 90'			Attendance: 12,323; Referee: Kenny Clark

26 September 1998 SPL	Celtic	1–1	Hearts	Celtic Park
	Donnelly 32'		Hamilton 53'	Attendance: 59,283; Referee: Willie Young

4 October 1998 SPL	Hearts	1–1	St Johnstone	Tynecastle Stadium
	Makel 79'		Preston 58'	Attendance: 13,121; Referee: Garry Mitchell

17 October 1998 SPL	Rangers	3–0	Hearts	Ibrox
	Johansson 50' Wallace 61', 90'			Attendance: 49,749; Referee: Stuart Dougal

24 October 1998 SPL	Hearts	0–1	Dundee United	Tynecastle Stadium
			Mathie 84'	Attendance: 13,124; Referee: George Simpson

31 October 1998 SPL	Dundee	1–0	Hearts	Dens Park
	Weir 77' (og.)			Attendance: 6,142; Referee: Mike McCurry

7 November 1998 SPL	Hearts	2–1	Kilmarnock	Tynecastle Stadium
	Adam 6' Fulton 86'		Wright 87'	Attendance: 14,363; Referee: Willie Young

14 November 1998 SPL	Motherwell	2–3	Hearts	Fir Park
	Hamilton 69' (pen.) Guerin 85'		Spencer 40' Coyle 68', 84'	Attendance: 8,912; Referee: Martin Clark

21 November 1998 SPL	Hearts	2–1	Dunfermline	Tynecastle Stadium
	Flogel 61' McCann 90'		Neto 18'	Attendance: 13,268; Referee: Stuart Dougal

6 December 1998 SPL	Hearts	2–1	Celtic	Tynecastle Stadium
	Adam 37', 49'		O'Donnell 74'	Attendance: 17,334; Referee: Mike McCurry

9 December 1998 SPL	St Johnstone	1–1	Hearts	McDiarmid Park
	Kernaghan 8'		Hamilton 31'	Attendance: 4,808; Referee: Alan Freeland

12 December 1998 SPL	Aberdeen	2–0	Hearts	Pittodrie
	Winters 32' Jess 37'			Attendance: 11,137; Referee: Kenny Clark

19 December 1998 SPL	Hearts	2–3	Rangers	Tynecastle Stadium
	Locke 2' Hamilton 69'		Guivarc'h 16', 63' Wallace 58'	Attendance: 17,134; Referee: Stuart Dougal

26 December 1998 SPL	Kilmarnock	1–0	Hearts	Rugby Park
	Holt 27'			Attendance: 10,668; Referee: John Rowbotham

30 December 1998 SPL	Hearts	1–2	Dundee	Tynecastle Stadium
	Lilley 37'		Sharp 18' (pen.) Falconer 42'	Attendance: 13,383; Referee: Hugh Dallas

2 January 1999 SPL	Dunfermline	0–0	Hearts	East End Park
				Attendance: 9,227; Referee: George Simpson

30 January 1999 SPL	Hearts	0–2	Motherwell	Tynecastle Stadium
			McCulloch 48' Adams 71'	Attendance: 12,821; Referee: Willie Young

6 February 1999 SPL	Celtic	3–0	Hearts	Celtic Park
	Larsson 21', 24', 66' (pen.)			Attendance: 59,844; Referee: Stuart Dougal

20 February 1999 SPL	Hearts	0–2	St Johnstone	Tynecastle Stadium
			Scott 59' Kane 63'	Attendance: 12,229; Referee: Hugh Dallas

27 February 1999 SPL	Hearts	0–2	Aberdeen	Tynecastle Stadium
			Bernard 53' Wyness 71'	Attendance: 13,957; Referee: Eric Martindale

20 March 1999 SPL	Dundee	2–0	Hearts	Dens Park
	Annand 54', 65'			Attendance: 5,500; Referee: Kenny Clark

3 April 1999 SPL	Hearts	2–2	Kilmarnock	Tynecastle Stadium
	McSwegan 16', 43'		Henry 73' McCoist 77'	Attendance: 14,689; Referee: Kenny Clark

6 April 1999 SPL	Dundee United	1–3	Hearts	Tannadice Park
	Dodds 7'		McSwegan 25', 45' Cameron 60'	Attendance: 10,648; Referee: Jim McCluskey

14 April 1999 SPL	Hearts	2–4	Celtic	Tynecastle Stadium
	Adam 27', 48'		Riseth 2' Blinker 7' Viduka 29', 52'	Attendance: 16,388; Referee: Stuart Dougal

17 April 1999 SPL	St Johnstone	0–0	Hearts	McDiarmid Park
				Attendance: 6,154; Referee: Willie Young

24 April 1999 SPL	Motherwell	0–4	Hearts	Fir Park
			Jackson 21' Adam 46', 59' Cameron 90'	Attendance: 8,926; Referee: Alan Freeland

3 May 1999 SPL	Hearts	2–0	Dunfermline Athletic	Tynecastle Stadium
	Cameron 55', 81'			Attendance: 15,176; Referee: Kenny Clark

9 May 1999 SPL	Rangers	0–0	Hearts	Ibrox
				Attendance: 49,495; Referee: Stuart Dougal

15 May 1999 SPL	Hearts	4–1	Dundee United	Tynecastle Stadium
	Ritchie 41' McSwegan 50' Adam 67' Cameron 77'		Eustace 90'	Attendance: 13,187; Referee: Dougie Smith

23 May 1999 SPL	Aberdeen	2–5	Hearts	Pittodrie
	McSwegan 2', 47', 49' Cameron 52' (pen.) Flogel 64'		Buchan 7' Jess 61'	Attendance: 13,042; Referee: John Rowbotham

=== Scottish League Cup ===
19 August 1998 Scottish League Cup	Hearts	4–2 (a.e.t.)	Raith Rovers	Tynecastle Stadium
	Adam 4' Hamilton 22' Kamp 106' (og.) Fulton 120'		Shields 41' Hartley 86'	Attendance: 11,653; Referee: Willie Young

9 September 1998 Scottish League Cup QF	Hearts	1–1 (3–0 p)	Ross County	Tynecastle Stadium
	Holmes 71'		McBain 40'	Attendance: 11,672; Referee: Kenny Clark

27 October 1998 Scottish League Cup SF	Hearts	0–3	St Johnstone	Easter Road
			Dasovic 41' Preston 45' O'Boyle 87'	Attendance: 12,027; Referee: Willie Young

=== Scottish Cup ===
24 January 1999 Scottish Cup R3	Motherwell	3–1	Hearts	Fir Park
	Brannan 13' Coyle 65' Thomas 74'		Hamilton 56'	Attendance: 9,327; Referee: Mike McCurry

=== UEFA Cup winners' cup ===
13 August 1998 Uefa Cup Winners' Cup qualifying round	(Estonia) Lantana Tallinn	0–1	(Scotland) Hearts	Kadrioru Staadionil
			Makel 21'	Attendance: 1,300; Referee: Michal Benes

27 August 1998 Uefa Cup Winners' Cup qualifying round	(Scotland) Hearts	5–0	(Estonia) Lantana Tallinn	Tynecastle Stadium
	Hamilton 18' Fulton 29' McCann 41' Flogel 75' Holmes 89'			Attendance: 15,053; Referee: Jan Wegereef

17 September 1998 Uefa Cup Winners' Cup round 1	(Scotland) Hearts	0–1	(Spain) Real Mallorca	Tynecastle Stadium
			Sierra 17'	Attendance: 13,573; Referee: Alfredo Trentalange

1 October 1998 Uefa Cup Winners' Cup round 1	(Spain) Real Mallorca	1–1	(Scotland) Hearts	Estadio Lluis Sitjar
	Lopez 49'		Hamilton 76'	Attendance: 12,218; Referee: Hermann Albrecht

== League table ==
Pos	Team	Pld	W	D	L	GF	GA	GD	Pts	Qualification or relegation
4	Kilmarnock	36	14	14	8	47	29	+18	56	Qualification for the UEFA Cup qualifying round (Note: Since Rangers, the winners of the 1998–99 Scottish Cup, already qualified for the UEFA Champions League, Celtic, the losing finalist, earned a spot in the 1999–2000 UEFA Cup. As such, the league's UEFA Cup place moved down to third-placed St Johnstone. Scotland were also awarded an additional UEFA Cup place as the association was top of the UEFA Fair Play ranking. Kilmarnock earned this place as winners of the Scottish Fair Play ranking.)
5	Dundee	36	13	7	16	36	56	−20	46	
6	Heart of Midlothian	36	11	9	16	44	50	−6	42	
7	Motherwell	36	10	11	15	35	54	−19	41	
8	Aberdeen	36	10	7	19	43	71	−28	37	

Updated to match(es) played on end of season. Source: Soccerway and SPL official website
Rules for classification: 1) Points; 2) Goal difference; 3) Goals scored

== Stats ==
=== Scorers ===
Pos	PLayer	SPL	SC	LC	CWC	Total
FW	(France) Stephane Adam	9	0	1	0	10
FW	(Scotland) Jim Hamilton	6	1	1	2	10
FW	(Scotland) Gary McSwegan	8	0	0	0	8
MF	(Scotland) Colin Cameron	6	0	0	0	6
MF	(Scotland) Neil McCann	3	0	0	1	4
MF	(Scotland) Steve Fulton	2	0	1	1	4
MF	(Austria) Thomas Flogel	2	0	0	1	3
MF	(England) Lee Makel	1	0	0	1	2
FW	(Scotland) Derek Holmes	0	0	1	1	2
MF	(Scotland) Gary Locke	1	0	0	0	1
MF	(France) Vincent Guerin	1	0	0	0	1
FW	(Scotland) Darren Jackson	1	0	0	0	1
FW	(Scotland) Derek Lilley	1	0	0	0	1
DF	(Scotland) Steven Pressley	1	0	0	0	1
DF	(Scotland) Paul Ritchie	1	0	0	0	1
DF	(Scotland) David Weir	1	0	0	0	1

== See also ==
- List of Heart of Midlothian F.C. seasons
