= 2000–01 Heart of Midlothian F.C. season =

Heart of Midlothian
2000–01 season
- Manager: Jim Jefferies; Peter Houston (Caretaker); Craig Levein
- Stadium: Tynecastle Stadium
- Scottish Premier League: 5th
- Scottish Cup: Quarter-finals
- League Cup: Quarter-finals
- UEFA Cup: First round
- Top goalscorer: League: Andy Kirk (13); All: Colin Cameron (16)
- Highest home attendance: 17,619 v Hibs SPL 26 December 2000
- Lowest home attendance: 7,502 v Berwick Rangers Scottish Cup 7 February 2001
- Average home league attendance: 12,771
Home colours

The 2000–01 season was the 120th season of competitive football by Heart of Midlothian, and their 18th consecutive season in the top level of Scottish football, competing in the Scottish Premier League. Hearts also competed in the UEFA Cup, Scottish Cup and League Cup.

== Managers ==
Hearts started the season under the stewardship of Jim Jefferies. He moved on to Bradford during the season, Peter Houston became Caretaker manager for 4 games before Craig Levein became Hearts new permanent manager.

== First team squad ==
Squad at end of season

Note: Flags indicate national team as defined under FIFA eligibility rules; some limited exceptions apply. Players may hold more than one non-FIFA nationality.

No.	Pos.	Nation	Player
1	GK	FRA	Gilles Rousset
2	DF	SCO	Steven Pressley
3	DF	SCO	Austin McCann
4	DF	CAN	Kevin McKenna
5	DF	SCO	Kevin James
6	DF	YUG	Gordan Petrić
7	FW	SCO	Gary McSwegan
8	MF	SCO	Steve Fulton
9	FW	FRA	Stéphane Adam
10	MF	SCO	Colin Cameron
11	DF	SCO	Darren Jackson
12	DF	SCO	Grant Murray
13	GK	SCO	Roddy McKenzie
14	MF	AUT	Thomas Flögel
15	FW	SCO	Gary Wales
16	MF	ENG	Lee Makel
17	FW	SCO	Gordon Durie
18	MF	JAM	Fitzroy Simpson
19	MF	SCO	Scott Severin
20	MF	ESP	Juanjo
21	MF	SVK	Róbert Tomaschek
22	MF	SCO	Steven Boyack
24	FW	NIR	Andy Kirk
26	GK	FIN	Antti Niemi

No.	Pos.	Nation	Player
28	DF	SCO	Kenny Milne
29	DF	SCO	Robbie Neilson
30	FW	SCO	Kris O'Neill
31	FW	SCO	Alasdair Graham
32	DF	SCO	Steven Reilly
33	DF	SCO	Darren Goldie
34	MF	SCO	Alan McIlroy
35	DF	SCO	Craig Neeson
36	DF	SCO	Anton Smith
37	MF	SCO	Stephen Simmons
38	FW	SCO	Ryan Davidson
39	GK	SCO	Craig Gordon
40	DF	IRL	Barry Smith
41	DF	SCO	Paul Kaczan
42	MF	SCO	Neil Janczyk
43	MF	SCO	Robert Sloan
44	DF	SCO	Paul Parkin
45	DF	SCO	Elliot Smith
46	MF	SCO	Gary Meek
47	DF	SCO	John Knox
48	MF	SCO	Joe Hamill
49	MF	SCO	Paul McLaughlin
50	FW	SCO	Graham Weir

=== Left club during season ===
Note: Flags indicate national team as defined under FIFA eligibility rules; some limited exceptions apply. Players may hold more than one non-FIFA nationality.

No. / Pos. / Nation / Player; 3 / DF / SCO / Gary Naysmith (to Everton)	No. / Pos. / Nation / Player; 4 / DF / SCO / Gary Locke (to Bradford City)

== Fixtures ==
=== Pre-season friendlies ===
15 July 2000 Friendly	Livingston	1–1	Hearts	Almondvale Stadium
	Goal		Kirk	Attendance: 3,268

18 July 2000 Friendly	Niort	0–0	Hearts
				Attendance: 980

20 July 2000 Friendly	Royal Charleroi	0–0	Hearts
				Attendance: 150

22 July 2000 Friendly	Toulouse	1–2	Hearts
	Goal		Jackson Adam	Attendance: 1,303

=== Scottish Premier League ===
30 July 2000 SPL	Hearts	0–0	Hibs	Tynecastle Stadium
				Attendance: 17,132; Referee: Kenny Clark

6 August 2000 SPL	St Johnstone	2–2	Hearts	McDiarmid Park
	Parker 31' Jones 73'		O'Neill 84' Tomaschek 88'	Attendance: 6,164; Referee: John Rowbotham

13 August 2000 SPL	Aberdeen	1–1	Hearts	Pittodrie
	Young 3'		McSwegan 30'	Attendance: 11,798; Referee: Hugh Dallas

19 August 2000 SPL	Hearts	2–4	Celtic	Tynecastle Stadium
	Severin 56' Juanjo 67'		Sutton 22', 26' Larsson 39' Moravcik 62'	Attendance: 16,744; Referee: Willie Young

27 August 2000 SPL	Dundee	1–1	Hearts	Dens Park
	Caballero 58'		Cameron 85' (pen.)	Attendance: 6,779; Referee: Kenny Clark

9 September 2000 SPL	Hearts	2–0	Dunfermline	Tynecastle Stadium
	Juanjo 6' McSwegan 64'			Attendance: 11,811; Referee: Robert Orr

17 September 2000 SPL	Rangers	1–0	Hearts	Ibrox
	De Boer 58'			Attendance: 47,340; Referee: Hugh Dallas

20 September 2000 SPL	Hearts	2–0	St Mirren	Tynecastle Stadium
	McSwegan 46' Juanjo 68'			Attendance: 10,524; Referee: John Underhill

24 September 2000 SPL	Hearts	0–2	Kilmarnock	Tynecastle Stadium
			Wright 5' Dindeleux 46'	Attendance: 10,379; Referee: Kenny Clark

1 October 2000 SPL	Hearts	3–0	Motherwell	Tynecastle Stadium
	Durie 12', 59' Kirk 27'			Attendance: 10,460; Referee: Willie Young

14 October 2000 SPL	Dundee United	0–4	Hearts	Tannadice Park
			Tomaschek 9' Kirk 25', 30' James 81'	Attendance: 7,016; Referee: Willie Young

22 October 2000 SPL	Hibs	6–2	Hearts	Easter Road
	Paatelainen 43', 45', 74' Zitelli 51' O'Neil 81' Latapy 84'		Kirk 5' Cameron 90'	Attendance: 12,926; Referee: Hugh Dallas

28 October 2000 SPL	Hearts	0–3	St Johnstone	Tynecastle Stadium
			Parker 49' (pen.) Connolly 62', 89'	Attendance: 10,938; Referee: George Clyde

4 November 2000 SPL	Hearts	3–0	Aberdeen	Tynecastle Stadium
	Cameron 24' Severin 62' Kirk 86'			Attendance: 12,744; Referee: Tom Brown

11 November 2000 SPL	St Mirren	1–2	Hearts	Love Street
	Gillies 89'		Cameron 22' (pen.) Severin 82'	Attendance: 5,328; Referee: John Rowbotham

18 November 2000 SPL	Celtic	6–1	Hearts	Celtic Park
	Joos Valgaeran 15' Moravcik 36' Larssonl 39', 81' Mjallby 44' Petrov 82'		Cameron 13'	Attendance: 59,813; Referee: Stuart Dougal

25 November 2000 SPL	Hearts	3–1	Dundee	Tynecastle Stadium
	Murray 52' Cameron 88', 90' (pen.)		Carranza 24'	Attendance: 11,539; Referee: Alan Freeland

29 November 2000 SPL	Dunfermline Athletic	1–0	Hearts	East End Park
	Dair 40'			Attendance: 5,642; Referee: Willie Young

3 December 2000 SPL	Hearts	0–1	Rangers	Tynecastle Stadium
			Albertz 12' (pen.)	Attendance: 16,710; Referee: Stuart Dougal

9 December 2000 SPL	Kilmarnock	0–3	Hearts	Rugby Park
			Fulton 45' Kirk 51', 55'	Attendance: 6,828; Referee: Dougie McDonald

16 December 2000 SPL	Motherwell	2–0	Hearts	Fir Park
	Townsley 56' Adams 87'			Attendance: 5,440; Referee: Mike McCurry

23 December 2000 SPL	Hearts	3–1	Dundee United	Tynecastle Stadium
	Cameron 2' Heaney 17' (og.) McSwegan 72'		Aljofree 26'	Attendance: 12,128; Referee: Kevin Toner

26 December 2000 SPL	Hearts	1–1	Hibs	Tynecastle Stadium
	McSwegan 60'		Lovell 41'	Attendance: 17,619; Referee: Willie Young

30 December 2000 SPL	St Johnstone	2–2	Hearts	McDiarmid Park
	Sylla 24' Connolly 35'		Kirk 6' Durie 77'	Attendance: 5713; Referee: J Fleming

2 January 2001 SPL	Aberdeen	1–0	Hearts	Pittodrie
	Rowson 7'			Attendance: 13,524; Referee: John Rowbotham

31 January 2001 SPL	Hearts	1–0	St Mirren	Tynecastle Stadium
	Cameron 74' (pen.)			Attendance: 10,164; Referee: Stuart Dougal

4 February 2001 SPL	Hearts	0–3	Celtic	Tynecastle Stadium
			Larsson 4', 68', 83'	Attendance: 13,077; Referee: Kenny Clark

24 February 2001 SPL	Hearts	7–1	Dunfermline	Tynecastle Stadium
	Adam 5', 38' Kirk 26', 60' Cameron 30', 46' Tomaschek 67'		Dair 50'	Attendance: 11,251; Referee: Alan Freeland

3 March 2001 SPL	Rangers	2–0	Hearts	Ibrox
	Andre Flo 35', 57'			Attendance: 49,003; Referee: Willie Young

14 March 2001 SPL	Hearts	3–0	Kilmarnock	Tynecastle Stadium
	Flogel 71' Juanjo 76' Scott Severin 89'			Attendance: 9,195; Referee: Garry Mitchell

18 March 2001 SPL	Dundee	0–0	Hearts	Dens Park
				Attendance: 7,327; Referee: Robert Orr

31 March 2001 SPL	Hearts	3–0	Motherwell	Tynecastle Stadium
	Tomaschek 14' Kirk 63', 80'			Attendance: 11,581; Referee: David Somers

7 April 2001 SPL	Dundee United	1–1	Hearts	Tannadice Park
	Thompson 45'		Wales 65'	Attendance: 7,242; Referee: Alan Freeland

22 April 2001 SPL	Celtic	1–0	Hearts	Celtic Park
	Moravcik 68'			Attendance: 59,298; Referee: Mike McCurry

27 April 2001 SPL	Kilmarnock	1–1	Hearts	Rugby Park
	McGowne 53'		Kirk 50'	Attendance: 6,867; Referee: Dougie McDonald

5 May 2001 SPL	Hearts	1–4	Rangers	Tynecastle Stadium
	Adam 46'		Albertz 28', 78' Wallace 48' Andre Flo 84'	Attendance: 15,158; Referee: Hugh Dallas

13 May 2001 SPL	Hibs	0–0	Hearts	Easter Road
				Attendance: 8,913; Referee: Stuart Dougal

20 May 2001 SPL	Hearts	2–0	Dundee	Tynecastle Stadium
	Adam 52' Cameron 70'			Attendance: 13,544

=== Scottish League Cup ===
6 September 2000 Scottish League Cup R4	Livingston	0–2	Hearts	Almondvale Stadium
			Cameron 15' Naysmith 54'	Attendance: 5,549; Referee: Mike McCurry

1 November 2000 Scottish League Cup QF	Hearts	2–5 (a.e.t.)	Celtic	Tynecastle Stadium
	Cameron 36' (pen.), 70' (pen.)		Crainey 41' Smith 60' Healy 99' Moravcik 116' McNamara 117'	Attendance: 12,922; Referee: Kenny Clark

=== Scottish Cup ===
27 January 2001 Scottish Cup R3	Berwick Rangers	0–0	Hearts	Shielfield Park
				Attendance: 3,139; Referee: John Rowbotham

7 February 2001 Scottish Cup R3 Replay	Hearts	2–1	Berwick Rangers	Tynecastle Stadium
	McSwegan 68' Juanjo 70'		Elliott 18'	Attendance: 7,502; Referee: Eric Martindale

17 February 2001 Scottish Cup R4	Hearts	1–1	Dundee	Tynecastle Stadium
	Juanjo 81'		Sara 30'	Attendance: 9,970; Referee: Hugh Dallas

7 March 2001 Scottish Cup R4 Replay	Dundee	0–1	Hearts	Dens Park
			Tomaschek 71'	Attendance: 6,947; Referee: John Underhill

11 March 2001 Scottish Cup QF	Celtic	1–0	Hearts	Celtic Park
	Larsson 40'			Attendance: 34,529; Referee: Kenny Clark

=== UEFA Cup ===
10 August 2000 Uefa Cup qualifying round	(Iceland) ÍBV Vestmannaeyjar	0–2	(Scotland) Hearts	Laugardalsvollur
			Severin 49' Jackson 67'	Attendance: 815; Referee: Stephane Moulin

24 August 2000 Uefa Cup qualifying round	(Scotland) Hearts	3–0	(Iceland) ÍBV Vestmannaeyjar	Tynecastle Stadium
	McSwegan 6' O'Neill 19' Tomaschek 39'			Attendance: 8,720; Referee: Antonio Manuel de Almeida Costa

14 September 2000 Uefa Cup round 1	(Germany) VfB Stuttgart	1–0	(Scotland) Hearts	Gottlieb Daimler Stadion
	Balakov 35'			Attendance: 12,000; Referee: Giancarlo Bolognino

28 September 2000 Uefa Cup round 1	(Scotland) Hearts	3–2	(Germany) VfB Stuttgart	Tynecastle Stadium
	Pressley 16' Petric 62' Cameron 83' (pen.)		Dundee 37' Bordon 58'	Attendance: 14,448; Referee: Bruno Derrien

== League table ==
Pos	Team	Pld	W	D	L	GF	GA	GD	Pts	Qualification or relegation (Note: Teams played each other three times (33 matches), before the league split into two groups (the top six and the bottom six) for the last five matches.)
3	Hibernian	38	18	12	8	57	35	+22	66	Qualification for the UEFA Cup first round
4	Kilmarnock	38	15	9	14	44	53	−9	54	Qualification for the UEFA Cup qualifying round (Note: As both finalists of the 2000–01 Scottish Cup, Celtic and Hibernian, qualified for European competition via their league position, the cup berth for 2001–02 UEFA Cup was passed to the next-placed team in the league, fourth-placed Kilmarnock.)
5	Heart of Midlothian	38	14	10	14	56	50	+6	52	
6	Dundee	38	13	8	17	51	49	+2	47	Qualification for the UEFA Intertoto Cup first round (Note: Dundee qualified for the 2001 UEFA Intertoto Cup as the highest-placed team to apply for a place in the competition.)
7	Aberdeen	38	11	12	15	45	52	−7	45	

Source: Scottish Professional Football League
Rules for classification: 1) Points; 2) Goal difference; 3) Goals scored

== See also ==
- List of Heart of Midlothian F.C. seasons
