= Gary Naysmith =

Scottish footballer and manager (born 1978)

Personal information
- Full name: Gary Andrew Naysmith
- Date of birth: 16 November 1978 (age 48)
- Place of birth: Edinburgh, Scotland
- Height: 5 ft 8 in (1.73 m)
- Positions: Left-back; left winger

Team information
- Current team: Ayr United (manager)

Youth career
- Tynecastle Boys Club
- Hutchison Vale
- 1995–1996: Heart of Midlothian
- 1995–1996: → Whitehill Welfare Colts (loan)

Senior career*
Years	Team	Apps	(Gls)
1996–2000	Heart of Midlothian	96	(3)
2000–2007	Everton	134	(6)
2007–2010	Sheffield United	79	(0)
2010–2012	Huddersfield Town	36	(0)
2012–2013	Aberdeen	9	(0)
2013–2016	East Fife	72	(0)
Total		426	(9)

International career
1996–1999	Scotland U21	22	(0)
2000–2009	Scotland	46	(1)
2003	Scotland B	1	(0)

Managerial career
- 2013–2016: East Fife
- 2016–2019: Queen of the South
- 2021–2022: Edinburgh City
- 2023–2026: Stenhousemuir
- 2026–: Ayr United
- * Club domestic league appearances and goals

Gary Andrew Naysmith (born 16 November 1978) is a Scottish football coach and former player, who is the manager of Scottish Championship side Ayr United.

Naysmith, who played as a left-back or left-winger, started his senior career with Hearts. Naysmith moved to England to sign with Premier League club Everton, where he stayed for seven seasons. Naysmith was capped 46 times by the Scotland national team between 2000 and 2009. After spells with Sheffield United and Huddersfield Town, Naysmith returned to Scotland with Aberdeen.

In the summer of 2013, Naysmith signed with part-time club East Fife, and was then appointed as player-manager in December. He managed Championship club Queen of the South from December 2016 to May 2019. He was appointed manager of Edinburgh City in March 2021, but was sacked a year later. Naysmith became Stenhousemuir manager in January 2023 and led them to promotions in the 2023/24 and 2025/26 seasons. Shortly before the second promotion was secured, Naysmith agreed to become the new manager of Ayr United.

== Playing career ==
=== Club ===
==== Heart of Midlothian ====
Naysmith started his senior career with Hearts, whom he joined from local side Whitehill's Colts team. Naysmith made his professional debut, aged only 17, several months later in a League Cup tie with Celtic. His opportunity arose from a suspension crisis, the Maroons having no fewer than four defenders (Bruno, Weir, Ritchie and Pointon) sent off in their previous match at Rangers. Despite the patchwork nature of their defence, Hearts defeated Celtic 1–0, with Naysmith earning plaudits for his mature display. Within a year he had established himself as the side's first-choice left back, displacing Neil Pointon, and in 1998 helped the Tynecastle club end their 36-year trophy drought by lifting the Scottish Cup. That season he was also named Scottish PFA Young Player of the Year.

A transitional season followed as the loss of Weir, McCann (both transferred) and Colin Cameron (injured) destabilised the side. Naysmith himself had to adapt to a change in the levels of expectation placed upon him, no longer allowed the defence of youthful naïveté. By the 1999–2000 season he had rediscovered his confidence and was being touted for an international call-up. A particular highlight of that season was his display in a 3–2 defeat of Celtic at Parkhead in February 2000. Hearts had trailed 2–0 before battling back to victory, with Naysmith striking a spectacular equalising goal.

As one of Hearts' most valuable assets, Naysmith was also the subject of transfer speculation. Financial concerns at the club heightened these and in October 2000 it appeared that Naysmith was bound for the West Midlands when Coventry City bid for him. However, their offer was bettered by Everton at the eleventh hour, and Naysmith moved to Merseyside instead, in a £1.7 million deal.

==== Everton ====
Naysmith first became a regular under Walter Smith and then remained under his successor David Moyes. His early performances led to Everton fans nicknaming "El Blanco Carlos", after the Brazilian left-back Roberto Carlos. He made 152 appearances for Everton, scoring six goals, although his Everton career was disrupted by injury. In December 2002 he was the victim of a "blood curdling, x-rated" tackle by Liverpool's Steven Gerrard. A long term ankle injury in 2005 meant that Naysmith lost his first-team place at Everton to Alessandro Pistone in the 2004–05 season, and in the 2005–06 season Portuguese international Nuno Valente claimed the left back slot at Goodison Park.

Naysmith recovered from ankle surgery in time for the start of the 2006–07 season and an injury to Valente in the season's opening game saw him restored to the starting eleven. He kept his place after Valente returned to fitness, however it was not long before injury befell him again, a medial ligament strain in the game against Newcastle United on 24 September 2006 keeping him out for two months.

At the end of the 2004–05 season, he signed a new three-year contract with the Blues. On 5 May 2007, Naysmith scored the third goal in a 3–0 victory over Portsmouth The win practically guaranteed that Everton would be playing in Europe during the 2007–08 season. Naysmith made over 130 Premier League appearances for the Toffees before leaving the club to join Championship side Sheffield United for £1 million in July 2007 as part of an exchange deal with Phil Jagielka.

==== Sheffield United ====
As part of the deal that took Phil Jagielka to Goodison Park, Naysmith was given permission to speak to Sheffield United to discuss a possible move. He was signed by The Blades and agreed a three-year deal at Bramall Lane, thus ending a six-and-half-year stay with Everton.

Naysmith made his first team début in the opening game of the 2007–08 season in a 2–2 home draw with Colchester United and quickly cemented his place in the side becoming the first choice at left back throughout the rest of the season. Naysmith started 42 games in his first season, 38 of them in the league.

Naysmith started the 2008–09 season as first choice left back, playing 43 games until he suffered serious cruciate ligament damage which ruled him out for the final weeks of the season, thus missing the club's unsuccessful play-off campaign. He made his first start of the season on the opening day in United's 1–0 loss at Birmingham City. Naysmith started 37 league games and made a further two appearances from the bench.

Due to an injury suffered towards the end of the 2008–09 season, Naysmith missed the majority of the 2009–10 season. He returned to the side in December 2009 and was listed as an unused substitute three times before making a successful return to the side for the last two games of the season, the first in The Blades 2–0 win over Swansea City, the second in their final day 3–0 win over Ipswich Town.

==== Huddersfield Town ====
Naysmith rejected a new deal at Bramall Lane, opting to sign a two-year deal with Yorkshire neighbours Huddersfield Town on 4 June 2010 on a free transfer. Naysmith revealed that he turned down offers from Premier League clubs where he would have had the chance to be a squad player to move to the Galpharm Stadium.

On 7 August 2010, Naysmith debuted for the Terriers in the 3–0 win versus Notts County at Meadow Lane. On 14 August 2010, Naysmith was then sent-off in his home debut for the Terriers versus Tranmere Rovers, as the match ended in a 0–0 draw. On 25 August 2010, Naysmith then suffered a toe injury in a League Cup second round 5–1 away defeat at his former club Everton, which caused him to miss the next five months of the season, as he eventually returned to play in a 2–0 home win versus Carlisle United in the league.

Naysmith departed the club in June 2012 after not being offered a new contract by the Terriers manager, Simon Grayson.

==== Aberdeen ====
Naysmith returned to Scotland to train with Aberdeen in July 2012, joining the club on a pre-season tour of Germany. After a successful trial and impressing in games against Werder Bremen and FC St. Pauli, Naysmith signed a one-year deal on 1 August, but expressed a desire to earn an extension beyond the summer. On the opening day of the 2012–13 season, Aberdeen faced SPL champions Celtic. Naysmith was named in the starting team that narrowly lost out 1–0 at Celtic Park. It was announced on 13 May 2013 that Naysmith's contract along with another six players would not be extended.

=== International ===
Naysmith represented Scotland at under-21, B and full international levels. He made his full Scotland debut in May 2000, in a 2–1 victory over the Republic of Ireland in Dublin, and earned 46 caps up to 2009. His only international goal arrived in 2002, during a UEFA Euro 2004 qualification game versus Iceland; he scored the second goal in a 2–0 win, with a right-footed volley from the edge of the penalty area.

Naysmith also represented Scotland B on one occasion on 20 May 2003, in a 2–1 home win versus Northern Ireland B.

== Coaching career ==
=== East Fife ===
On 31 October 2013 Naysmith agreed to stay with League One East Fife until the end of the season in a player-assistant manager role. When manager Willie Aitchison left the club on 28 November, Naysmith was made caretaker manager, and was subsequently appointed as manager on a permanent basis on 18 December.

On 1 December 2016 and after three and a half seasons as player-manager of part-time club East Fife, Naysmith signed for Scottish Championship club Queen of the South as their new manager to go full-time in Dumfries.

Naysmith's intention was to finish his playing career and his time as the Methil club's player-manager by taking charge of the club's Scottish Cup replay against Edinburgh City on 5 December 2016. However, as the match was postponed until 7 December 2016, Naysmith departed East Fife earlier than planned to be in charge of Queens' league match versus St Mirren on 6 December 2016 instead.

=== Queen of the South ===
Naysmith signed a contract with Scottish Championship club Queen of the South on 1 December 2016. After becoming team manager in the following week, Naysmith decided to end his playing career.

Naysmith was named Scottish Championship Manager of the Month for January 2019. On 4 May 2019, after the Doonhamers were defeated 3–0 at home versus Partick Thistle and finished in the relegation play-off place in the Scottish Championship, Naysmith parted company with the Dumfries club.

In August 2019, Naysmith returned to Hearts in a newly created role of managing players loaned out to other clubs.

=== Edinburgh City ===
Naysmith was appointed manager of Scottish League Two club Edinburgh City in March 2021. He was sacked in March 2022, with the team sitting in 4th place of the 2021–22 Scottish League Two table.

=== Stenhousemuir ===
On 3 January 2023, Naysmith was named as the new manager of Scottish League Two side Stenhousemuir. In his first full season in charge he led Stenhousemuir to the Scottish League Two title, helping the club achieve their first ever title after 140 years. Naysmith then led Stenhousemuir to a second promotion in 2026 via the playoffs, shortly after he had agreed a move to Ayr United.

=== Ayr United ===
On 6 May 2026, Scottish Championship side Ayr United announced that Naysmith would be named as their club manager following the conclusion of Stenhousemuir's League One playoff campaign, he will be joined by his current Assistant Manager Brown Ferguson with them signing a three year contract.

== Career statistics ==
=== Club ===
Club	Season	League			National cup (Note: Includes Scottish Cup, FA Cup)		League cup (Note: Includes Scottish League Cup, Football League Cup)		Other		Total	
Club	Season	Division	Apps	Goals	Apps	Goals	Apps	Goals	Apps	Goals	Apps	Goals
Heart of Midlothian	1995–96	Scottish Premier Division	1	0	0	0	0	0	—		1	0
Heart of Midlothian	1996–97	Scottish Premier Division	10	0	1	0	1	0	0	0	12	0
Heart of Midlothian	1997–98	Scottish Premier Division	16	2	5	0	0	0	—		21	2
Heart of Midlothian	1998–99	Scottish Premier League	26	0	1	0	2	0	3 (Note: Appearances in UEFA Cup Winners' Cup)	0	32	0
Heart of Midlothian	1999–2000	Scottish Premier League	34	1	3	0	2	0	—		39	1
Heart of Midlothian	2000–01	Scottish Premier League	9	0	0	0	1	1	4 (Note: Appearances in UEFA Cup)	0	14	1
Heart of Midlothian	Total		96	3	10	0	6	1	7	0	119	4
Everton	2000–01	Premier League	20	2	1	0	0	0	—		21	2
Everton	2001–02	Premier League	24	0	4	0	0	0	—		28	0
Everton	2002–03	Premier League	28	1	1	0	3	1	—		32	2
Everton	2003–04	Premier League	29	2	3	0	2	0	—		34	2
Everton	2004–05	Premier League	11	0	3	0	1	0	—		15	0
Everton	2005–06	Premier League	7	0	1	0	0	0	0	0	8	0
Everton	2006–07	Premier League	15	1	1	0	1	0	—		17	1
Everton	Total		134	6	14	0	7	1	0	0	155	7
Sheffield United	2007–08	Championship	38	0	3	0	2	0	—		43	0
Sheffield United	2008–09	Championship	39	0	3	0	1	0	0	0	43	0
Sheffield United	2009–10	Championship	2	0	0	0	0	0	—		2	0
Sheffield United	Total		79	0	6	0	3	0	0	0	88	0
Huddersfield Town	2010–11	League One	14	0	0	0	2	0	3 (Note: Appearances in League One play-offs)	0	19	0
Huddersfield Town	2011–12	League One	22	0	1	0	2	0	1 (Note: Appearance in Football League Trophy)	0	26	0
Huddersfield Town	Total		36	0	1	0	4	0	4	0	45	0
Aberdeen	2012–13	Scottish Premier League	9	0	0	0	2	0	–		11	0
East Fife	2013–14	Scottish League One	10	0	0	0	0	0	0	0	10	0
East Fife	2014–15	Scottish League Two	21	0	1	0	0	0	0	0	22	0
East Fife	2015–16	Scottish League Two	29	0	2	0	2	0	0	0	33	0
East Fife	2016–17	Scottish League One	12	0	1	0	4	0	2 (Note: Appearances in Scottish Challenge Cup)	0	19	0
East Fife	Total		72	0	4	0	6	0	2	0	84	0
Career total			426	9	35	0	28	2	13	0	502	11

=== International ===
Scotland
Year	Apps	Goals
2000	4	0
2001	2	0
2002	3	1
2003	12	0
2004	6	0
2005	1	0
2006	4	0
2007	6	0
2008	6	0
2009	2	0
Total	46	1

International goals

Scores and results list Scotland's goal tally first.

#	Date	Venue	Opponent	Result	Competition
1.	12 October 2002	Laugardalsvöllur Reykjavík, Iceland	Iceland	2–0	UEFA Euro 2004 qualifying

=== Managerial record ===
As of match played 20 November 2026

Managerial record by team and tenure
Team	Nat	From	To	Record							
Team	Nat	From	To	G	W	D	L	GF	GA	GD	Win %
East Fife	(Scotland)	28 November 2013	3 December 2016	132	50	28	54	188	183	+5	37.88
Queen of the South	(Scotland)	3 December 2016	4 May 2019	117	41	34	42	183	163	+20	35.04
Edinburgh City	(Scotland)	9 March 2021	17 March 2022	56	23	13	20	72	71	+1	41.07
Stenhousemuir	(Scotland)	3 January 2023	16 May 2026	162	72	44	46	221	188	+33	44.44
Ayr United	(Scotland)	16 May 2026		21	10	4	7	30	25	+5	47.62
Total				491	195	123	173	690	619	+71	39.71

- Edinburgh City statistics include forfeit win over Falkirk in the Scottish League Cup on 21 July 2021.
- Initially caretaker of East Fife and appointed permanently on 18 December 2013.

== Honours ==
=== Player ===
Heart of Midlothian

- Scottish Cup: 1997–98

Huddersfield Town

- Football League One play-offs: 2012

East Fife

- Scottish League Two: 2015–16

Scotland

- Kirin Cup: 2006

=== Manager ===
East Fife

- Scottish League Two: 2015–16

Stenhousemuir

- Scottish League Two: 2023–24
- Scottish Championship play-offs: 2025-26
