= Flögel =

Flögel, also spelled Floegel, is a German surname. Notable people with the surname include:

- Rudi Flögel (born 1939), Austrian footballer
- Thomas Flögel (born 1971), Austrian footballer and manager, son of Rudi
