= Kim Deinoff =

Norwegian footballer (born 1976)

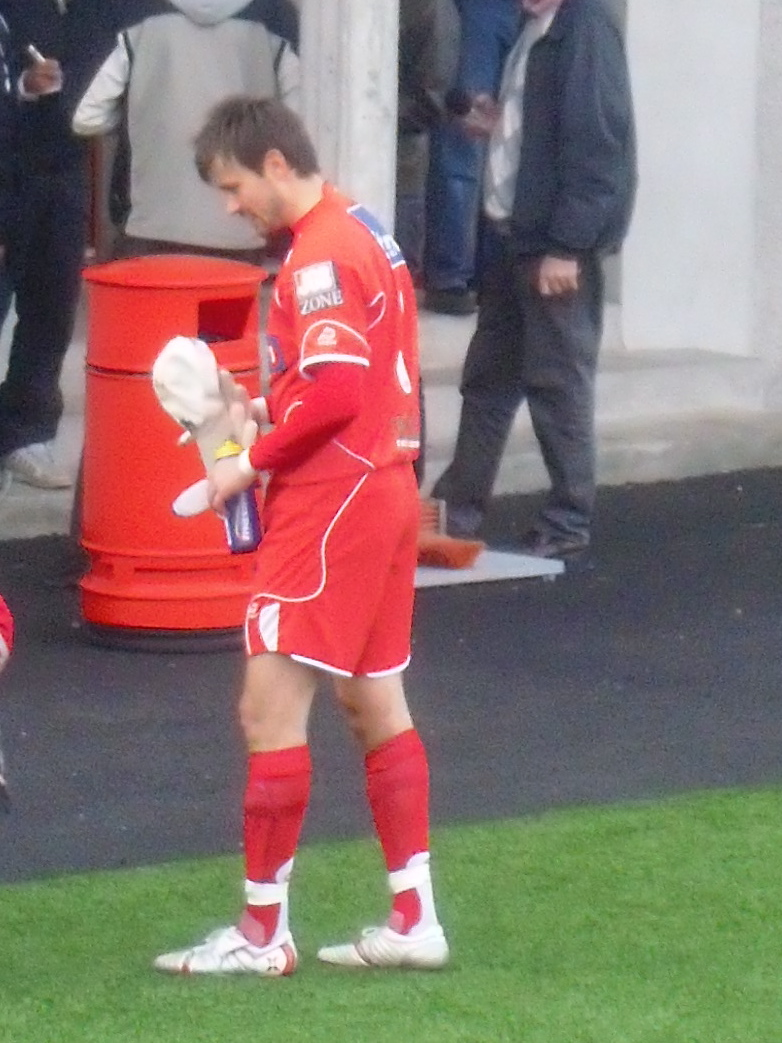
- Deinoff with Løv-Ham in 2009

Personal information
- Full name: Kim Erik Deinoff
- Date of birth: 2 December 1976 (age 49)
- Place of birth: Oslo, Norway
- Position: Goalkeeper

Youth career
- Skeid

Senior career*
| Years | Team | Apps | (Gls) |
| –1996 | Skeid | 0 | (0) |
| 1997–1999 | Abildsø | | |
| 2000–2002 | Raufoss | | |
| 2003–2005 | Aalesund | 50 | (0) |
| 2006–2007 | Hødd | | |
| 2008–2009 | Løv-Ham | 57 | (0) |
| 2010 | Manglerud Star | | |
| 2011–2013 | Kongsvinger | 61 | (0) |
- * Club domestic league appearances and goals as of 23 May 2013

Kim Deinoff (born 2 December 1976) is a retired Norwegian footballer who played as a goalkeeper for Aalesund in Eliteserien, and has also played for Skeid, Abildsø, Raufoss, Hødd, Løv-Ham, Manglerud Star and Kongsvinger.

== Career ==
Born in Oslo, Deinoff grew up playing for Skeid, and was the second-choice goalkeeper behind Roger Vaaler when the club played in Tippeligaen in 1996. As Deinoff did not play any matches for Skeid, he joined Abildsø the next season to play more regularly. He played for Abildsø for three seasons until he joined First Division side Raufoss where he soon became the first-choice goalkeeper. After three seasons with Raufoss, he joined the newly promoted Tippeligaen side Aalesund as a free agent ahead of the 2003 season.

Deinoff was brought to Aalesund as a back-up for Frank Mathiesen, but became the first-choice half-way through the 2003 season and played 13 matches for the club in their first season in Tippeligaen. After the team was relegated to the First Division, Aalesund met one of their challengers for promotion, Sandefjord in a match on 6 June 2004. Towards the end of the first half, Sandefjord's Andreas Augustsson got a red card for biting Deinoff in the arm. Augustsson said after the match that he was stuck underneath a few players and was struck by panic, but the next day he apologized to Deinoff. Despite playing half the match with ten players, Sandefjord won 2–0, but at the end of the season Aalesund was promoted ahead of Sandefjord with Deinoff playing 29 matches. Following the arrival of Adin Brown, Deinoff was the second-choice goalkeeper in 2005, but made 8 appearances during the season when Brown was injured. Deinoff played a total of 89 matches for Aalesund.

Ahead of the 2006 season Deinoff transferred to Hødd, and signed a two-year contract with the club. After two seasons as Hødd's first-choice goalkeeper, Deinoff was a free agent after the 2007 season and was wanted by Kristiansund and English side Torquay United. He instead signed with Løv-Ham and in his first season with Løv-Ham he was voted as the "player of the year" by his team-mates when the team finished 12th in the 2008 Norwegian First Division. Deinoff also claimed that it was his best season so far in his career.

Løv-Ham struggled with the finances after the 2009 season, and could not afford extending the contracts with their key-players Deinoff and Prince Efe Ehiorobo, who were on full-time contracts. Deinoff was offered a part-time contract, but Deinoff turned down the offer. He later trialed with Strømsgodset, Hønefoss and Sandnes Ulf before he returned to Oslo and joined the Second Division side Manglerud Star. He made his debut for the club on 17 April 2010 against Nest-Sotra. In the 3–3 draw against Os on 23 May 2010, Deinoff scored the equalizing goal after a corner kick during stoppage time. This was the second time Deinoff had scored a goal in his career, the first came as a Løv-Ham player in the 2009 Norwegian Football Cup when he scored in the penalty shoot-out against Start which Løv-Ham won 15–14.

After Manglerud/Star was bankrupted ahead of the 2011 season, Deinoff joined Kongsvinger on a one-year contract. In competition with Tobias Holmen Johansen for the goalkeeper-spot Deinoff played 14 matches in the First Division in his first season for the club. He signed a new two-year contract with Kongsvinger in March 2012 and played 18 matches in the 2012 season.
