= Tobias Holmen Johansen =

Norwegian footballer (born 1990)

Tobias Johansen
Personal information
- Full name: Tobias Holmen Johansen
- Date of birth: 29 August 1990 (age 36)
- Place of birth: Tønsberg, Norway
- Position: Goalkeeper

Team information
- Current team: Kongsvinger
- Number: 57

Youth career
- –2005: Teie
- 2006–2008: Tønsberg
- 2008–2010: Manchester City

Senior career*
Years	Team	Apps	(Gls)
2010	→ Kongsvinger (loan)	1	(0)
2010–2013	Kongsvinger	18	(0)

International career^{‡}
2006	Norway U-17	2	(0)
2009	Norway U-19	4	(0)
- * Club domestic league appearances and goals as of 14 March 2013 ‡ National team caps and goals as of 14 March 2013

Tobias Holmen Johansen (born 29 August 1990) is a retired Norwegian professional footballer who last played as a goalkeeper for Norwegian club Kongsvinger. He joined the club from Manchester City in 2010, where he played together with his younger brother Eirik. Johansen has represented Norway at youth international level.

== Early life ==
Johansen was born in Tønsberg and grew up in Nøtterøy Municipality where he played for Teie IF during his youth, before he became a goalkeeper-reserve in the 2. divisjon club FK Tønsberg. Johansen's younger brother Eirik, who also plays as a goalkeeper, was invited for a trial with Manchester City during the 2007 fall, but due to a fracture in his foot he could not train. The family however travelled to England and arranged for Tobias to have a trial instead, even though he was too old to join the academy. Tobias impressed at the trial, and City offered him a contract. He lived with a host family in the beginning of his spell in Manchester, but after Eirik joined the academy in August 2008 their mother and two younger brothers moved to Manchester as well.

== Club career ==
=== Manchester City ===
Johansen never played for Manchester City's first team, but was playing regularly for the reserve team and was occasionally considered as City's third-choice goalkeeper, and was in the match squad for six matches. While loaned out to Kongsvinger, Manchester City announced on 7 June 2010 that the club had released Martin Petrov, Sylvinho, Benjani, Jack Redshaw Karl Moore and Johansen from their contracts. Johansen claimed later the same month in an interview with the local newspaper Tønsbergs Blad, that he was promised a new contract, but after Mark Hughes departed the club, this did not happen.

=== Kongsvinger ===
Johansen was loaned out to Kongsvinger in the spring of 2010, as a replacement for Kongsvinger's second-choice goalkeeper Olav Dalen who was injured, and Johansen stated that he was looking forward to train with the experienced goalkeeper Thomas Myhre. Johansen played Kongsvinger's first-round match of the 2010 Norwegian Football Cup and made his debut in Tippeligaen against Start on 16 May 2010. The loan-deal was originally lasting till 30 June, but after he was released from City he signed a 3-year professional contract with Kongsvinger on 12 June 2010, with the Director of Sport, Morten Kristiansen, stating that young talented goalkeepers are rare in Norway, and Johansen is our goalkeeper for the future. He finished the season as third-choice goalkeeper, but after Dalen punctured his lung when Myhre was already injured, Johansen played the last two matches of the season.

Johansen were competing with Kim Deinoff for the goalkeeper-spot, and played 16 of 30 matches in the 2011 Norwegian First Division. Deinoff however became the first-choice in 2012, and Johansen got trouble with his back in May 2012 and was injured for the rest of the season. In January 2013, Johansen was hoping to be ready to play when the season started in April and was looking forward to again challenge the first-choice goalkeeper Deinoff.

== International career ==
Johansen has represented Norway at youth international level, and played two matches for the under-16 team in 2006 before he played four matches for the under-19 team in 2009.

== Career statistics ==
As of 29 May 2013

Season	Club	Division	League		Cup		Total	
Season	Club	Division	Apps	Goals	Apps	Goals	Apps	Goals
2010	Kongsvinger	Tippeligaen	3	0	1	0	4	0
2011	Kongsvinger	Adeccoligaen	16	0	0	0	16	0
2012	Kongsvinger	Adeccoligaen	0	0	0	0	0	0
2013	Kongsvinger	Adeccoligaen	0	0	0	0	0	0
Career Total			19	0	1	0	20	0
