= David Weir (Scottish footballer) =

Scottish footballer (born 1970)

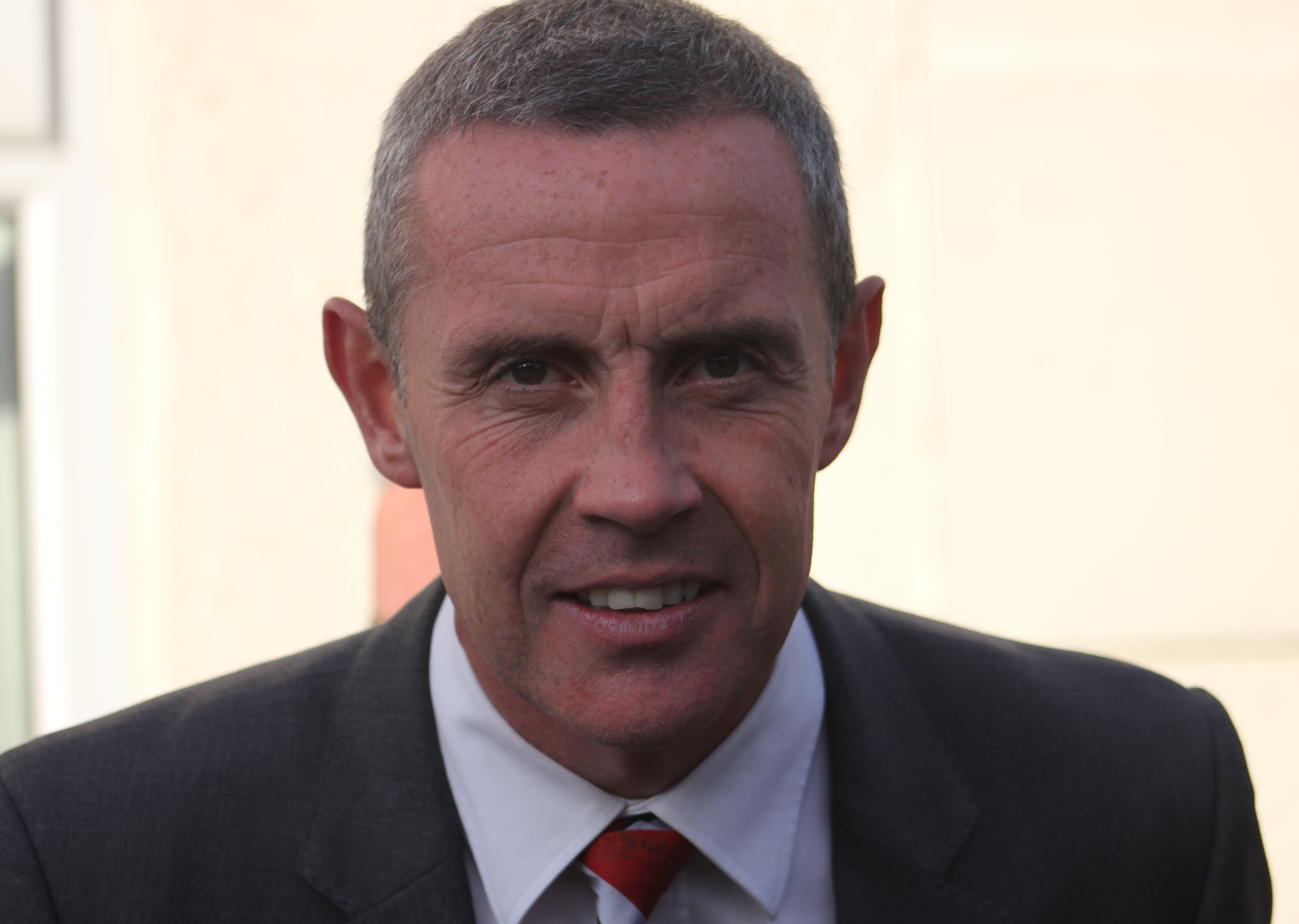
- Weir in 2014

Personal information
- Full name: David Gillespie Weir
- Date of birth: 10 May 1970 (age 56)
- Place of birth: Falkirk, Scotland
- Height: 6 ft 3 in (1.91 m)
- Position: Centre-back

College career
Years	Team	Apps	(Gls)
1988–1992	Evansville Purple Aces		

Senior career*
Years	Team	Apps	(Gls)
1992–1996	Falkirk	133	(8)
1996–1999	Heart of Midlothian	76	(6)
1999–2007	Everton	235	(10)
2007–2012	Rangers	162	(4)
Total		606	(28)

International career
1997–2010	Scotland	69	(1)

Managerial career
- 2013: Sheffield United
- * Club domestic league appearances and goals

David Gillespie Weir (born 10 May 1970) is a Scottish football coach and former professional player who was most recently the technical director of Premier League club Brighton & Hove Albion.

Born in Falkirk, Weir played as a defender, and began his professional career with his home-town club, Falkirk, after having attended the University of Evansville in the United States. After four seasons with the Bairns, Weir then moved on to Heart of Midlothian where he won the 1998 Scottish Cup. He joined Everton in 1999 and spent seven years with the club, becoming club captain under two different managers. Weir then moved to Rangers in 2007 and became club captain after Barry Ferguson was stripped of the role in April 2009. Weir called time on his playing career in May 2012.

Weir won his first cap for the Scotland national team in 1997 and was selected for their 1998 FIFA World Cup squad. He retired from international football in 2002, when Berti Vogts was the manager, but returned when Walter Smith took charge in 2004. Weir became the oldest Scotland player when he played in UEFA Euro 2012 qualifying matches in 2010, and he finished his international career with 69 caps.

Weir had a brief spell as manager of Sheffield United in 2013. He has since assisted Mark Warburton at Brentford, Rangers and Nottingham Forest.

== Club career ==
=== Evansville Purple Aces ===
Weir was scouted by the University of Evansville. He moved to the United States on a scholarship from 1988 to 1991. Weir excelled in this position, scoring 28 goals in 27 matches during his senior year. This form led to him being named an NCAA All-American and Midwest Collegiate Conference Player of the Year in 1990. Weir is tied for the school record with 50 career goals and ranks second in school history with 129 career points.

He was the first former collegiate player to represent a European nation at the FIFA World Cup in 1998.

=== Falkirk ===
In 1992, he joined Falkirk after coming back from completing a scholarship in America. He went on to make 151 appearances for the club and score nine goals. He was part of the side which was relegated from the Scottish Premier Division in 1993, and then won promotion back up in 1994. Weir also won the 1993 Scottish Challenge Cup on 12 December, playing in the side that defeated St Mirren 3–0 at Fir Park in Motherwell.

=== Heart of Midlothian ===
On 30 June 1996, Weir moved to Premier Division side Heart of Midlothian. He made his debut for the club in a League Cup match against Stenhousemuir on 14 August 1996 and scored his first goal three days later. Weir netted Hearts second goal in a 3–2 win over Kilmarnock. His first sending off was in an infamous game against Rangers at Ibrox on 14 September 1996. Rangers won the match 3–0 but Hearts had four players ordered off in a twenty-minute spell.

Weir won his second career honour, the 1998 Scottish Cup, by beating Rangers 2–1 in the final at Celtic Park. He left Tynecastle midway through the following season when he was purchased by Everton for £250,000. Weir played 116 games in all for Hearts and scored twelve goals.

=== Everton ===
Weir joined Everton on 16 February 1999 and made his debut in a league match against Middlesbrough the next day as Everton won, 5–0, coming on as a substitute for John Oster after 73 minutes. Weir's first goal for Everton was a last-minute equaliser against Leeds United in a 4–4 draw in October 1999, however the following week he picked up his first red card for Everton in another game against Middlesbrough. At the end of the 2001–02 season, Weir was voted Everton's Player of the Year by planetfootball's readers, with Weir the only player to reach four figures in terms of votes. In the Merseyside derby match on 19 April 2003, Weir received a red card as Everton lost 2–1 and played with 9 men after Gary Naysmith was also sent off.

He had a very successful time with the Merseyside club, playing regularly for eight years, making 269 appearances (scoring 10 goals in the process), playing in European competition, becoming club captain under two different managers – Walter Smith and David Moyes – and winning the bulk of his Scotland caps on the strength of his performances for the Toffees. During the 2005–06 season, his side played in UEFA Champions League but lost 4–2 on aggregate to Spanish side Villarreal CF in the third qualifying round. After being eliminated in the Champions League, Everton played in the UEFA Cup but lost again, this time to Romanian side Dinamo București 5–2 on aggregate in the first round of UEFA Cup.

=== Rangers ===
On 16 January 2007, Weir signed for Rangers on an initial six-month deal after Everton released him from his contract early. He teamed up again with former manager Walter Smith. He made his Rangers debut against Dunfermline Athletic on 21 January 2007. His performances for the Glasgow club were enough to secure a one-year contract. After his man-of-the-match performance against St Mirren on 8 April 2007, he revealed that he may remain at Rangers for the 2007–08 season after discussing the issue with his family. His agent met with Rangers on 19 April to discuss a possible extension to his contract, which was due to expire at the end of that season. Weir signed a one-year extension to his deal, keeping him at Rangers until the summer of 2008.

He scored his first Rangers goal against FK Zeta in a UEFA Champions League qualifier, on 31 July 2007. Weir was highly praised for his endurance during the 2007–08 season as Rangers chased The Quadruple. Despite being in his late 30s, he managed sixty appearances that season and produced some outstanding performances alongside Carlos Cuéllar in the centre of defence. Weir won his third and fourth trophies of his career in 2008, as Rangers claimed Scottish Cup and League Cup glory. On 3 July he signed a further one-year contract extension to his deal. He was appointed Rangers' captain on 3 April 2009 after Barry Ferguson had been stripped the role following an incident whilst on international duty. Weir won the League and Cup double in season 2008–09 with Rangers and signed a further one-year contract extension which saw playing into his forties. In March 2010, Weir won the Player of the month award for February and followed this up with the Clydesdale Bank Premier League Player of the Year award for the 2009–10 season. On 7 May 2010 it was announced Weir had also won the Scottish Football Writers' Association Footballer of the Year Award, the oldest player ever to receive this accolade – just three days before his 40th birthday. Soon afterwards, Weir agreed another one-year contract which saw him play on into his forties. He became the third oldest player ever to compete in the UEFA Champions League on 14 September 2010 in Rangers' 0–0 away draw with Manchester United at Old Trafford and he became the joint oldest outfield player in Champions League history when he played against Bursaspor in December 2010, aged 40 years 211 days. Weir captured his third league title with Rangers as captain on the week of his 41st birthday when Rangers defeated Kilmarnock 5–1 on the last day of the season beating Celtic to the title by a single point.

On 26 May 2011, it was announced that Weir was to be inducted into the Rangers F.C. Hall of Fame. He has become the first ever player to be inducted into the Hall of Fame whilst under contract at the club. On 17 July 2011, Weir signed a new one-year deal with Rangers. Following Walter Smith's retirement as manager, Ally McCoist succeeded him. Under McCoist, Weir did not play in the League, and he was replaced as captain by Steven Davis. Weir made his last appearance in the Champions' League Third qualifying round 1st leg against Swedish side Malmö FF. Weir played for 29 minutes, before being replaced by Juan Manuel Ortiz.

On 17 January 2012, he announced that he would be leaving Rangers in order to continue his career at an unnamed club in England. The club he was close to signing for was Sheffield United and he trained with the Blades for several weeks, however he moved into coaching instead.

== International career ==
Weir earned his first cap for Scotland in a 1–0 defeat to Wales on 27 May 1997. He scored his one and only goal for Scotland in a World Cup qualifier against Latvia at Hampden Park on 6 October 2001.

Weir temporarily retired from international football in 2002 after his performance in a UEFA Euro 2004 qualifying match against the Faroe Islands was criticised by manager Berti Vogts. He returned to international football when Walter Smith was appointed Scotland manager in December 2004.

Weir became a member of the Scotland national football team roll of honour when he won his 50th Scotland cap. This milestone came in a match against Lithuania on 6 September 2006, in which he captained his country to a 2–1 win. He captained Scotland four times.

On 24 August 2010, Weir was recalled to the Scotland squad at the age of 40 for the Euro 2012 qualifying matches against Lithuania and Liechtenstein in September 2010. Weir became the oldest ever Scottish football international when he played against Lithuania on 3 September 2010, aged 40 years and 116 days, breaking Jim Leighton's previous record of 40 years and 78 days. This record was surpassed on 7 June 2024 by Craig Gordon.

== Coaching and managerial career ==
=== Everton coach ===
In February 2012, Weir returned to Everton in a coaching capacity with the club's academy and reserve teams. He made his reserve-team debut for the club against Liverpool on the day of his return. When manager David Moyes left the club to replace Sir Alex Ferguson at Manchester United in May 2013, Weir was interviewed by Bill Kenwright for the vacant role at Everton, but the job instead went to Roberto Martínez.

=== Sheffield United manager ===
In June 2013, Weir signed a three-year deal to manage League One side Sheffield United. Despite winning his first competitive game in charge, a 2–1 victory over Notts County, United struggled under his management and failed to win any of their following twelve matches, leading to growing pressure from the club's fans for Weir to be sacked. After United were beaten at home by League Two side Hartlepool United, eliminating them from the Football League Trophy, Weir was sacked on 11 October 2013.

=== Assistant to Mark Warburton ===
Following the departure of caretaker Alan Kernaghan, Weir was appointed as Mark Warburton's assistant manager at League One side Brentford on 16 December 2013. After a successful season which saw Brentford promoted to the Championship, Weir signed a new one-year rolling contract to remain with the Griffin Park club. On 17 February 2015, it was announced that Weir, Warburton and Sporting Director Frank McParland would leave Brentford at the end of the 2014–15 season.

On 15 June 2015, Weir returned to Rangers on a three-year deal to assist Warburton. Weir and Warburton extended their contracts with Rangers by a further year in July 2016. In February 2017 Rangers released an official statement claiming that Weir, Warburton and head of recruitment Frank McParland had resigned their positions, effective immediately. This was denied in a joint statement by all three men, but their tenure at the club had nonetheless come to an end. Weir then assisted Warburton at Nottingham Forest, but they were sacked on 31 December 2017.

=== Brighton & Hove Albion ===
As of April 2019, Weir was working for Brighton & Hove Albion in a role in which he manages young players who are loaned out to foreign clubs. In 2022 he was appointed the club's Technical Director.

On 12 September 2025, Brighton & Hove Albion announced Weir's departure from the club.

== Personal life ==
As of 2011, Weir and his wife Fiona had four children: Lucas, Jensen, Kenzie and Ruben. Lucas, Jensen and Kenzie are also footballers. Lucas and Jensen play as midfielders, while Kenzie plays as a defender. They were all born in Warrington. Lucas plays for semi-professional club 1874 Northwich. Jensen is currently at Wigan Athletic and has played for both Scotland and England since under-17 level. Kenzie made her senior team debut for Everton in January 2022, in the fourth round of the 2021–22 Women's FA Cup.

He is a graduate of Manchester Metropolitan University's Masters of Sport Directorship programme.

== Career statistics ==
Appearances and goals by national team and year
National team	Year	Apps	Goals
Scotland	1997	3	0
Scotland	1998	6	0
Scotland	1999	10	0
Scotland	2000	5	0
Scotland	2001	6	1
Scotland	2002	7	0
Scotland	2003	—	
Scotland	2004	—	
Scotland	2005	8	0
Scotland	2006	7	0
Scotland	2007	9	0
Scotland	2008	2	0
Scotland	2009	2	0
Scotland	2010	4	0
Total		69	1

== Managerial statistics ==
Managerial record by team and tenure
Team	From	To	Record				
Team	From	To	P	W	D	L	Win %
Sheffield United	10 June 2013	11 October 2013	13	1	3	9	7.7

== Honours ==
Evansville Purple Aces

- Horizon League: 1990, 1991

Falkirk

- Scottish First Division: 1993–94
- Scottish Challenge Cup: 1993–94

Heart of Midlothian

- Scottish Cup: 1997–98

Rangers

- Scottish Premier League: 2008–09, 2009–10, 2010–11
- Scottish Cup: 2007–08, 2008–09
- Scottish League Cup: 2007–08, 2009–10, 2010–11
- UEFA Cup runner-up: 2007–08

Scotland

- Kirin Cup: 2006

Individual

- SFWA Footballer of the Year: 2010
- SPL Player of the Year: 2010
- SPL Player of the Month: February 2010
- NCAA All-American: 1989, 1990
- MCC Player of the Year: 1990
- Evansville Purple Aces Hall of Fame: 1997

== See also ==
- List of Scotland national football team captains
- List of Scottish football families
