= 1997–98 Scottish Cup =

Tournament details
- Country: Scotland

Final positions
- Champions: Heart of Midlothian
- Runners-up: Rangers

The 1997–98 Scottish Cup was the 113th staging of Scotland's most prestigious football knockout competition. The cup was won by Heart of Midlothian who defeated Rangers in the final.

== First round ==
Home team	Score	Away team
Fraserburgh (HL)	1 – 0	Clyde (3)
Cowdenbeath (4)	0 – 0	Montrose (4)
East Fife (3)	2 – 3	Stranraer (3)
Inverness CT (3)	3 – 1	Whitehill Welfare (ESL)

=== Replay ===
Home team	Score	Away team
Montrose (4)	2 – 1	Cowdenbeath (4)

== Second round ==
Home team	Score	Away team
Clydebank (3)	6 – 0	Montrose (4)
East Stirlingshire (4)	1 – 1	Edinburgh City (ESL)
Stenhousemuir (3)	4 – 0	Deveronvale (HL)
Stranraer (3)	2 – 1	Fraserburgh (HL)
Livingston (3)	2 – 1	Berwick Rangers (4)
Arbroath (4)	1 – 1	Queen of the South (3)
Annan Athletic (ESL)	3 – 1	Vale of Leithen (ESL)
Forfar Athletic (3)	1 – 2	Albion Rovers (4)
Inverness CT (3)	2 – 0	Queen's Park (4)
Lossiemouth (HL)	0 – 1	Dumbarton (4)
Peterhead (HL)	0 – 2	Alloa Athletic (4)
Ross County (4)	3 – 1	Brechin City (3)

=== Replays ===
Home team	Score	Away team
Edinburgh City (ESL)	0 – 0 (4 – 3 pen.)	East Stirlingshire (4)
Queen of the South (3)	4 – 0	Arbroath (4)

== Third round ==
Home team	Score	Away team
Dundee (2)	4 – 2	St Mirren (2)
Airdrieonians (2)	2 – 2	Ross County (4)
Alloa Athletic (4)	0 – 3	Ayr United (2)
Celtic (1)	2 – 0	Greenock Morton (2)
Dumbarton (4)	1 – 1	Motherwell (1)
Dundee United (1)	1 – 0	Aberdeen (1)
Dunfermline Athletic (1)	7 – 2	Edinburgh City (ESL)
Hamilton Academical (2)	1 – 2	Rangers (1)
Hearts (1)	2 – 0	Clydebank (3)
Hibernian (1)	1 – 2	Raith Rovers (2)
Inverness CT (3)	8 – 1	Annan Athletic (ESL)
Livingston (3)	3 – 3	Albion Rovers (4)
Queen of the South (3)	1 – 3	Stirling Albion (2)
St Johnstone (1)	1 – 0	Partick Thistle (2)
Stenhousemuir (3)	1 – 3	Falkirk (2)
Stranraer (3)	0 – 2	Kilmarnock (1)

=== Replays ===
Home team	Score	Away team
Ross County (4)	1 – 0	Airdrieonians (2)
Albion Rovers (4)	0 – 0 (6 – 5 pen.)	Livingston (3)
Motherwell (1)	1 – 0	Dumbarton (4)

== Fourth round ==
Home team	Score	Away team
Dunfermline Athletic (1)	1 – 2	Celtic (1)
Ayr United (2)	2 – 0	Kilmarnock (1)
Dundee United (1)	1 – 1	Inverness CT (3)
Hearts (1)	3 – 0	Albion Rovers (4)
Motherwell (1)	2 – 2	Rangers (1)
Raith Rovers (2)	1 – 3	Falkirk (2)
Ross County (4)	1 – 1	Dundee (2)
St Johnstone (1)	3 – 1	Stirling Albion (2)

=== Replays ===
Home team	Score	Away team
Inverness CT (3)	2 – 3	Dundee United (1)
Dundee (2)	3 – 0	Ross County (4)
Rangers (1)	3 – 0	Motherwell (1)

== Quarter-finals ==
8 March 1998

Rangers (1)	0–0	Dundee (2)

Ibrox Stadium, Glasgow
Attendance: 40,309

Dundee United (1)	2–3	Celtic (1)

Tannadice Park, Dundee

Falkirk (2)	3–0	St Johnstone (1)

Brockville Park, Falkirk

Hearts (1)	4–1	Ayr United (2)

Tynecastle Stadium, Edinburgh

=== Replay ===
18 March 1998

Dundee (2)	1–2	Rangers (1)

Dens Park, Dundee
Attendance: 12,418

== Semi-finals ==
4 April 1998

Falkirk	1–3	Hearts
McAllister 86'		Adam 5', 90'; McCann 90'

Ibrox Stadium, Glasgow
Attendance: 31,587

5 April 1998

Rangers	2–1	Celtic
McCoist 75'; Albertz 88'		Burley 90'

Celtic Park, Glasgow
Attendance: 48,000
Referee: Jim McCluskey

== Final ==
16 May 1998

Hearts	2–1	Rangers
Cameron 2' (pen.); Adam 52'		McCoist 81'

Celtic Park, Glasgow
Attendance: 48,946
Referee: Willie Young

== Largest Wins ==
A list of the largest wins from the competition.

Score	Home team	Away team	Stage
8-1	Inverness Caledonian Thistle	Annan Athletic	Third Round
6-0	Clydebank	Montrose	Second Round
7-2	Dunfermline Athletic	Edinburgh City	Third Round
