= Róbert Tomaschek =

Slovak footballer

Personal information
- Full name: Róbert Tomaschek
- Date of birth: 25 August 1972 (age 54)
- Place of birth: Nitra, Czechoslovakia
- Height: 1.86 m (6 ft 1 in)
- Position: Midfielder

Youth career
- Nitra

Senior career*
Years	Team	Apps	(Gls)
1990–1993	Nitra	53	(3)
1993–2000	Slovan Bratislava	134	(9)
2000–2002	Heart of Midlothian	49	(4)

International career^{‡}
1994–2001	Slovakia	52	(4)
Medal record
Slovan Bratislava
Winner	Slovak Cup	1994, 1997, 1999
Winner	Slovak League	1994, 1995, 1996, 1999
- * Club domestic league appearances and goals as of 4 November 2014 ‡ National team caps and goals as of 4 November 2014

Róbert Tomaschek (born 25 August 1972 in Nitra) is a retired Slovak footballer. A midfielder, he played domestically for Plastika Nitra, appearing in 5 league matches. and Slovan Bratislava, as well as Hearts in Scotland. He was also a Slovak international, playing 52 times and scoring 4 goals. He captained his country before retiring early due to injury in 2002, aged 30.

== International goals ==
Score and result list Slovakia's goal tally first.

#	Date	Venue	Opponent	Score	Result	Competition
1	10 October 1998	Rheinpark Stadion, Vaduz, Liechtenstein	Liechtenstein	3–0	4–0	UEFA Euro 2000 qualifying
2	10 October 1998	Rheinpark Stadion, Vaduz, Liechtenstein	Liechtenstein	4–0	4–0	UEFA Euro 2000 qualifying
3	19 May 1999	Mestský štadión, Dubnica, Slovakia	Bulgaria	2–0	2–0	Friendly
4	24 March 2001	Ali Sami Yen Stadium, Istanbul, Turkey	Turkey	1–1	1–1	2002 FIFA World Cup qualification
