= Roger Vaaler =

Norwegian footballer (born 1971)

Personal information
- Date of birth: 23 January 1971 (age 55)
- Place of birth: Norway
- Position: Goalkeeper

Senior career*
Years	Team	Apps	(Gls)
- Kløfta
- Frigg
- Ready
1992	Lillestrøm	0	(0)
- Grei
1996–2000	Skeid	85+	(0)
1999	Hearts	0	(0)
2000–2001	Bristol Rovers	0	(0)
2001	Stabæk	0	(0)
–2007	Ull/Kisa		
2007	Eidsvold Turn		
2007–20xx	Ull/Kisa		
- * Club domestic league appearances and goals

Roger Vaaler (born 23 January 1971) is a Norwegian retired footballer who played as a goalkeeper. He is last known to have worked as head coach of Gjerdrum IL, Under-16 team.

== Career ==
Vaaler started his senior career with Kløfta IL. In 1996, he signed for Skeid Fotball in the Norwegian Tippeligaen, where he made ninety-nine appearances and scored zero goals. After that, he played for English club Bristol Rovers, and Norwegian clubs Stabæk Fotball, Ullensaker/Kisa IL, and Eidsvold TF before retiring.
