= Juanjo (footballer, born 1977) =

Spanish footballer

Personal information
- Full name: Juan José Carricondo Pérez
- Date of birth: 4 May 1977 (age 49)
- Place of birth: Barcelona, Spain
- Position: Attacking midfielder

Team information
- Current team: Horta

Youth career
- Damm
- Barcelona

Senior career*
Years	Team	Apps	(Gls)
1995–1996	Barcelona C	5	(1)
1995–1998	Barcelona B	79	(8)
1996	Barcelona	1	(0)
1998–2001	Hearts	74	(9)
2001–2003	Bradford City	26	(1)
2003–2004	Jaén	37	(3)
2004–2006	Inverness Caledonian Thistle	31	(7)
2006	→ Hamilton Academical (loan)	11	(1)
2006–2007	Granada	29	(3)
2007–2008	Premià	18	(4)
2008–2009	Mataró	9	(0)
2009	Mollet	15	(3)
2009–2010	Gibraltar United	14	(11)
2010–2011	ASIL Lysi		
2011–2012	APEP		
2012–2013	Aris Limassol		
2013	APEP		
2013–2014	Mollet	16	(0)
2014–2015	Rubí	36	(0)
2015–2017	Vilanova		(14)
2017–2018	Igualada	12	(0)
2018	Gavà	18	(2)
2018–	Horta	7	(0)
- * Club domestic league appearances and goals as of 4 November 2018

Juan José Carricondo Pérez (born 4 May 1977), commonly known as Juanjo, is a Spanish former professional footballer who played as an attacking midfielder.

Never having played in higher than Segunda División in his own country – with the exception of one game for Barcelona – he would spend seven years of his career playing in England (two seasons) and Scotland (five), representing a total of four clubs.

== Club career ==
=== Barcelona ===
Born in Barcelona, Catalonia, Juanjo was a youth product at La Liga giants FC Barcelona. During the three years he spent with the team as a senior, however, he only appeared once for the main squad, against Deportivo de La Coruña at the Riazor Stadium (ten minutes played in an eventual 2–2 draw).

=== Scotland / England ===
In 1998, Juanjo moved to Edinburgh to play for Heart of Midlothian, where he received his first taste of Scottish football. His spell at the club was very successful, as he amassed official totals of 85 games and 11 goals during his three-year stint.

Juanjo later followed manager Jim Jefferies to England and Bradford City in the second division. He scored on his debut appearance for his new team, against Walsall. After one and a half seasons, he returned to his country and signed with Real Jaén in Segunda División B.

After a move to Livingston fell through, John Robertson, manager of Inverness Caledonian Thistle, offered Juanjo a return to Scotland in the summer of 2004. He was one of the most influential players in the Caley Jags' first-ever season in the Scottish Premier League, scoring and assisting alike as they finished eighth.

A ruptured achilles tendon injury kept Juanjo from participating in Inverness's games in the early part of the following campaign. When he returned to fitness, he found himself falling out of favour with player-coach Craig Brewster and, during the following January transfer window, the player was allowed to move to Hamilton Academical on loan for the rest of the season. He scored two goals for the team, in the Scottish Cup against Dundee F.C. and in the league against Brechin City.

=== Later years ===
Aged 29, Juanjo left Inverness and Scotland, joining another side in his country's third level, Granada CF. In the following two years he played amateur football with as many teams, in his native region.

In July 2008, Juanjo was an unnamed trialist for Airdrie United in a pre-season testimonial against Blackburn United, in honour of captain Craig Spence's ten years at the junior side. In January of the following year, he briefly returned to England, being handed a trial with League Two side AFC Bournemouth following recommendation from former club midfielder Claus Bech Jørgensen, his former teammate at Bradford; however, nothing came of it.

In late August 2009, Juanjo signed with Gibraltar United FC, leaving after one season at the age of 33 and resuming his career in Cyprus and in the Spanish lower leagues.
