= Stuart Dougal =

Scottish football referee

- Born: 6 November 1962 (age 63); Glasgow, Scotland

Domestic
| Years | League | Role |
| 1993–1998 | Scottish Football League | Referee |
| 1998–2009 | Scottish Premier League | Referee |

International
| Years | League | Role |
| 1996–2007 | FIFA | Referee |

Stuart Dougal (born 6 November 1962) is a retired Scottish football referee who was on the FIFA international list. He refereed the Scottish Cup final in 2004 and 2008.

Dougal refereed over 100 International appointments and visited 38 countries as a referee. He refereed 2 Uefa Intertoto Cup Finals and was 4th Official at the 2002 Super Cup Final to Hugh Dallas between Feyenoord and Real Madrid and was at Euro 2004 in the same capacity.

In 2004 Dougal received a fine for use of bad language towards Christian Nerlinger of Rangers.

In September 2007 Dougal refereed his last international match, a UEFA Euro 2008 qualifying match between Turkey and Hungary. The match ended 3–0 in Turkey's favour. Dougal made his greatest professional mistake in the match sending Gera off instead of giving a penalty to Hungary at 0:0.

On 16 May 2009, Dougal refereed his last game before retiring, a match between Aberdeen and Rangers. He sent off Aberdeen's Charlie Mulgrew for a headbutt on Kyle Lafferty and Rangers' central defender Madjid Bougherra on the word of his assistant referee. The case was also referred to the Scottish Football Association's disciplinary committee, who rescinded both red cards and gave Lafferty a two-match ban for simulation.

Since retiring as a referee, Dougal has written a column for the Daily Record.
