= Jim McCluskey =

Scottish football referee (1950–2013)

James McCluskey
- Born: 1 November 1950; Scotland
- Died: 14 November 2013 (aged 63); Ayr, Scotland
- Other occupation: Surveyor

Domestic
Years	League	Role

International
Years	League	Role

James McCluskey (1 November 1950 – 14 November 2013) was a Scottish football player and referee, who officiated in the 1991 FIFA Women's World Cup and the final of UEFA Women's Euro 1991.

== Career ==
A former player in the early 1970s before becoming an official, he refereed the 1990 Scottish League Cup final, an Old Firm fixture in which Rangers defeated Celtic 2–1 at Hampden Park (leading a group of Celtic supporters to have him followed by a private investigator to uncover any bias towards their rivals), the 1993 Scottish Cup final where Rangers beat Aberdeen 2–1 at Celtic Park, the 1993 Scottish League Cup final at Celtic Park in which Rangers overcame Hibernian 2–1, and the 1994 Scottish League Cup final won on penalties by Raith Rovers over Celtic at Ibrox Stadium. With the national cup finals being spread around those locations during the 1990s due to reconstruction work, this gave McCluskey the unique distinction of having refereed such matches at all three venues.

McCluskey also oversaw the second leg of the 1994 UEFA Cup final between Inter Milan and Casino Salzburg, and altogether took charge of more than 50 FIFA and UEFA matches.

To celebrate his career, the Scottish Football Association awarded McCluskey a Scottish Cup final game for his swansong. He presided over the 2000 Scottish Cup final, in which Rangers beat Aberdeen 4–0 at Hampden.

McCluskey, who worked as a surveyor in Ayrshire in addition to refereeing, died on 14 November 2013 in Ayr, aged 63.
