= Neil McCann =

Scottish footballer and football manager

Personal information
- Full name: Neil Doherty McCann
- Date of birth: 11 August 1974 (age 52)
- Place of birth: Greenock, Renfrewshire, Scotland
- Height: 5 ft 10 in (1.78 m)
- Position: Left winger

Team information
- Current team: Kilmarnock (manager)

Youth career
- Greenock Morton

Senior career*
| Years | Team | Apps | (Gls) |
| 1992–1996 | Dundee | 79 | (5) |
| 1996–1998 | Heart of Midlothian | 74 | (19) |
| 1998–2003 | Rangers | 113 | (19) |
| 2003–2006 | Southampton | 40 | (0) |
| 2006–2008 | Heart of Midlothian | 25 | (0) |
| 2008–2009 | Falkirk | 24 | (1) |
| 2011 | Dundee | 3 | (1) |
| Total | | 358 | (45) |

International career
| 1998–2005 | Scotland | 26 | (3) |

Managerial career
- 2017–2018: Dundee
- 2021: Inverness Caledonian Thistle (interim)
- 2026–: Kilmarnock
- * Club domestic league appearances and goals

Neil Doherty McCann (born 11 August 1974) is a Scottish football pundit, former professional player and coach who is currently the manager of Kilmarnock. He has recently worked as a pundit for BBC Scotland's Sportscene.

A left winger, his playing career saw him represent Dundee (two spells), Heart of Midlothian (two spells), Rangers, Southampton and Falkirk. He also played 26 times for Scotland.

After working as a pundit for Sky Sports he was appointed manager of Dundee in 2017 before being sacked in October 2018. He took on the role of caretaker manager of Inverness Caledonian Thistle in 2021. McCann was an interim coach at Rangers from February to May 2025 before returning to management with Kilmarnock in January 2026.

== Club career ==
McCann started his career with Dundee before moving on to Heart of Midlothian in 1996. He helped the Tynecastle side win the Scottish Cup in 1998, their first major trophy in 36 years. McCann moved to Rangers later that year for £1.9 million, becoming the club's first major Scottish Catholic signing since Mo Johnston. He scored two goals in a 3–0 win for Rangers against their arch-rivals Celtic on 2 May 1999, which clinched the 1998–99 Scottish Premier League title. McCann left Rangers in 2003, as the club were forced to sell him due to financial problems. Speaking in February 2019, McCann said that he had been subject to sectarian abuse from Celtic fans that stemmed from his decision to sign for Rangers.

He joined Southampton on 5 August 2003, for £1.5 million. A series of injuries made it difficult for him to maintain his place in the team. McCann scored one goal for Southampton, in a League Cup tie against Northampton Town. His contract with Southampton was terminated by mutual consent in January 2006.

On 17 January 2006, McCann rejoined Hearts. He sustained a medial knee ligament injury while playing in his first match after returning to Hearts, which meant that he missed the rest of the 2005–06 season (including the 2006 Scottish Cup Final). McCann played in 28 games during the 2006–07 season, but then suffered a double leg break during a game at Celtic Park on 25 August 2007.

On 14 May 2008 it was announced that McCann had signed for Falkirk. He scored on his Falkirk debut, against former club Hearts, and then scored in League Cup ties against Queen of the South and Inverness. His last appearance for Falkirk was in the 2009 Scottish Cup Final. McCann was released on 22 August 2009 after managerial changes at Falkirk, with outgoing manager John Hughes (the manager that signed him) being replaced by Eddie May.

On 12 February 2011, McCann came out of retirement to help Dundee stave-off relegation from the First Division. He scored a last minute goal in his first appearance, against Raith Rovers. McCann was inducted into the Dundee FC Hall of Fame in 2016.

== International career ==
McCann made his full international debut for Scotland on 5 September 1998, coming on as a late substitute for Ally McCoist in a goalless draw against Lithuania. His first appearance in the starting line-up was on 31 March 1999 in a 2–1 home defeat to the Czech Republic. McCann scored three goals for Scotland, including two in UEFA Euro 2004 qualifying matches against the Faroe Islands and Germany. He made 26 appearances for Scotland, with his last coming in a 1–1 draw with the United States in November 2005.

== Coaching career ==
=== Dunfermline Athletic ===
McCann joined Dunfermline Athletic as a coach in July 2012, initially on a voluntary basis. The club entered administration in March 2013 and suffered a second successive relegation.

The club exited administration in December 2013 and manager Jim Jefferies and McCann were both offered new contracts. Jefferies retired in December 2014, leaving McCann and John Potter in charge of the team. On 30 April 2015, McCann decided to leave Dunfermline.

=== Dundee ===
McCann's first managerial position came at Scottish Premiership side Dundee, where he was appointed on an interim basis on 18 April 2017. McCann oversaw five matches for his former team, securing their place in the Scottish Premiership at the end of the 2016-17 season. Dundee announced on 29 May that McCann would leave the club.

On 1 June, McCann was appointed Dundee manager on a permanent basis after an approach for Jack Ross was rejected by St Mirren. He was sacked by the club on 16 October 2018, with Dundee bottom of the 2018–19 Scottish Premiership after collecting just three points from eight games.

=== Inverness Caledonian Thistle ===
After John Robertson was given compassionate leave in February 2021, McCann was appointed interim manager of Scottish Championship club Inverness Caledonian Thistle. McCann left this position after the 2020-21 season was completed, with Robertson returning in a sporting director role and a new manager appointed, despite attempts to appoint McCann on a permanent basis.

=== Rangers ===
On 24 February 2025, McCann was appointed to the coaching team at Scottish Premiership club Rangers, supporting interim manager Barry Ferguson for the remainder of the 2024–25 season.

=== Kilmarnock ===
McCann was appointed Kilmarnock manager on 6 January 2026.

== Media work ==
McCann became a pundit for Sky Sports, providing analysis on their coverage of football in Scotland, after he left Falkirk in 2009. McCann left Sky in June 2017, when he was appointed Dundee manager on a permanent basis. He now works for Sky Sports, BBC, RangersTV and ITV as a pundit.

== Personal life ==
In April 2024, McCann lost a dispute with HM Revenue & Customs regarding IR35 rules, which resulted in him incurring a tax liability of approximately £210,000. The dispute arose because McCann had used a limited company to receive payments from Sky Sports for his punditry work, while HMRC contended that he should have been treated as an employee of Sky.

== Career statistics ==
=== International ===
Appearances and goals by national team and year
| National team | Year | Apps | Goals |
|---|---|---|---|
| Scotland | 1998 | 1 | 0 |
| Scotland | 1999 | 4 | 0 |
| Scotland | 2000 | 6 | 1 |
| Scotland | 2001 | 2 | 0 |
| Scotland | 2002 | 2 | 0 |
| Scotland | 2003 | 5 | 2 |
| Scotland | 2004 | 2 | 0 |
| Scotland | 2005 | 4 | 0 |
| Total | | 26 | 3 |

Scores and results list Scotland's goal tally first, score column indicates score after each McCann goal.

List of international goals scored by Neil McCann
| No. | Date | Venue | Opponent | Score | Result | Competition |
|---|---|---|---|---|---|---|
| 1 | 2 September 2000 | Skonto Stadions, Riga, Latvia | Latvia | 1–0 | 1–0 | 2002 FIFA World Cup qualification |
| 2 | 6 September 2003 | Hampden Park, Glasgow, Scotland | Faroe Islands | 1–0 | 3–1 | UEFA Euro 2004 qualification |
| 3 | 10 September 2003 | Westfalenstadion, Dortmund, Germany | Germany | 1–2 | 1–2 | UEFA Euro 2004 qualification |

=== Manager ===
As of match played 21 November 2026

Managerial record by team and tenure
| Team | Nat | From | To | Record | | | | | | | |
| Team | Nat | From | To | G | W | D | L | GF | GA | GD | Win % |
|---|---|---|---|---|---|---|---|---|---|---|---|
| Dundee | (Scotland) | 18 April 2017 | 16 October 2018 | 65 | 22 | 9 | 34 | 66 | 96 | −30 | 33.85 |
| Inverness Caledonian Thistle (interim) | (Scotland) | 23 February 2021 | 30 April 2021 | 16 | 6 | 6 | 4 | 21 | 18 | +3 | 37.50 |
| Kilmarnock | (Scotland) | 6 January 2026 | Present | 38 | 13 | 9 | 16 | 53 | 68 | −15 | 34.21 |
| Total | | | | 119 | 41 | 24 | 54 | 140 | 182 | −42 | 34.45 |

- Interim manager from 18 April until 29 May 2017 at Dundee before appointment.

== Honours ==
Heart of Midlothian

- Scottish Cup: 1997–98

Rangers

- Scottish Premier League: 1998–99, 1999–2000, 2002–03
- Scottish Cup: 1998–99, 1999–2000, 2001–02, 2002–03
- Scottish League Cup: 2001–02, 2002–03
