= Mike McCurry (referee) =

Scottish football referee

Thomas Michael McCurry (born 4 June 1964) is an ex football referee from Scotland. He refereed the 2005 Scottish League Cup Final. McCurry considered his refereeing to be a hobby and lists his main occupation as "Minister of Christian Faith".

On 18 May 2009, the SFA ended McCurry's refereeing career when they omitted him from the list of senior officials who will handle matches in Scotland during the 2009–10 football season. He had previously been one of the SFA's FIFA referees.

He is a Baptist senior pastor at the Mosspark Baptist Church in Glasgow. He is also a member of the Glasgow Magic Circle.

McCurry enjoys running and playing 5-a-side football in his spare time.
