= Kenny Clark (referee) =

Scottish football referee

Kenny Clark (born 1 November 1961) is a Scottish former football referee in the Scottish Premier League and was, until 2006, also on the FIFA International list and the 2007–08 season was his final season as a Category 1 Referee. He also works as a lawyer in Dumbarton and is also a popular after dinner speaker.

He refereed the Scottish League Cup Final in 2000, 2003 and 2008. He has also taken charge of the Scottish Cup final on three occasions: in 2001, 2003 and 2007.

Clark officiated in qualifiers for the 2006 World Cup and Euro 2004. He also served as an assistant referee at the 1992 Olympic tournament in Barcelona. He is known to have refereed international matches during the period from 1997 to 2005.

In 2001, he refereed the Cairo Derby.
