= Hugh Dallas =

Scottish football referee (born 1957)

Hugh Dallas MBE
- Born: 26 October 1957 (age 68); Allanton, Scotland

Domestic
Years	League	Role
1983–1990	SJFA	Referee
1990–2005	SPL and SFL	Referee

International
Years	League	Role
1992–2002	FIFA listed	Referee

Hugh Dallas MBE (born 26 October 1957) is a Scottish former football referee. He officiated at two FIFA World Cup tournaments, in 1998 and 2002; he was appointed fourth official for the 2002 FIFA World Cup Final. Dallas also officiated at the 1996 Olympic Games, the 1999 UEFA Cup Final and several UEFA Champions League matches.

From June 2009 until November 2010, Dallas was the SFA's Referee Development Officer. He is a UEFA Referee Officer. He is also currently the Referee Development Consultant for TFF's Arbitration Committee, a position he has been occupying since June 2022.

== Refereeing career ==
Dallas was born in Allanton, near Shotts.

He refereed his first amateur match in 1982 between Motherwell Bridgeworks and Victoria AFC.

His first foreign engagement came in 1988 when he was a linesman at a Cup Winners' Cup tie between Sampdoria and Carl Zeiss Jena. While running the line at the 1993 Toulon Tournament, Dallas stopped a match between Czechoslovakia and Portugal after spotting a serious injury to Czech player Martin Svedik. Dallas was credited with saving the player's life and thanked by Ivan Kopecky, the coach of the Czech team, for his intervention.

Early in his career, Dallas took the advice of Brian McGinlay and began to referee international matches in a different way to those in Scotland. Dallas contends that foreign players dive more than their Scottish counterparts and that the diving of foreign players who enter Scottish football is reduced by Scottish match officials.

Dallas was one of 12 referees selected to officiate at the 1996 Summer Olympics in the USA. During the tournament Dallas was the referee at three group matches.

In June 1997, Dallas refereed an important 1998 FIFA World Cup qualification match between Spain and the Czech Republic. Early in the second half, Alfonso Pérez fell over in the Czech penalty area close to, but untouched by, Czech goalkeeper Pavel Srníček, but Dallas awarded a penalty kick to Spain. In 2003, Dallas rated the mistake as the worst of his career. Dallas admitted to embarrassment and guilt after the match, as the penalty kick proved decisive in giving a 1–0 win to Spain. Their defeat cost the Czech Republic any chance of qualifying for the 1998 FIFA World Cup.

UEFA offered Dallas police protection after he awarded Italy a late penalty in their 2–1 win over Turkey at Euro 2000. Dallas' former colleague Brian McGinlay said that the penalty decision was wrong, but nevertheless claimed Dallas was "the best referee in Britain." Dallas was the fourth official in the semi–final match between France and Portugal. Dallas was not disappointed to miss the final as he "never imagined that the final was a possibility.' During the routine review of matches, Dallas' performance in the early matches was given the equivalent of a gold star by UEFA committee member Ken Ridden. The committee were also impressed by his man management skills.

Dallas presided over AC Milan's exit from the 2000–01 UEFA Champions League, in a 1–1 draw at the San Siro. The crowd pelted Dallas with missiles including coins, fruit, bottles and cigarette lighters as he left the field under police protection.

=== Celtic v Rangers 1999 ===
In May 1999, Dallas presided over an important Old Firm fixture. Celtic needed to beat Rangers in this match to prevent them winning the Scottish Premier League championship at Celtic Park. The match was given a Sunday evening kick-off for reasons of live Sky Sports television coverage.

The match had a frenzied start, with Dallas penalising two fouls within the first minute. Play was later stopped for several minutes while Dallas received treatment after being hit on the head by a coin thrown by a Celtic supporter. Over the course of the match at least four Celtic fans invaded the field of play to confront Dallas, while another Celtic fan fell from an upper section of terracing and was taken to hospital. Rangers won the match 3–0 and therefore the league championship.

Later that evening, a brick was thrown through a window in Dallas' home. A behavioural psychologist was hired by Celtic to investigate Dallas, with the report largely supported Dallas' performance and instead blamed the behaviour of players. Since the events of that day, Old Firm league matches have normally been played in the early afternoon and the possibility of an Old Firm title decider has been deliberately avoided.

=== 1998 FIFA World Cup ===
The first match at the 1998 FIFA World Cup for Dallas was a 2–2 draw between Mexico and Belgium. He sent off Pavel Pardo and Gert Verheyen during the match. Dallas was also the referee for the quarter-final match between Italy and France. More than a decade later, Dallas admitted to surprise and disappointment at being overlooked for the later stages of the competition.

=== 2002 FIFA World Cup ===
During the 2002 FIFA World Cup tournament, Portugal objected to Dallas' selection for their group-stage game with Poland, referring to their experience with Dallas during UEFA Euro 2000. Portugal went on to win the match 4–0.

Dallas refereed the quarter–final between the USA and Germany. Early in the second half, he declined to award a penalty kick to the USA after a shot by Gregg Berhalter was blocked on the goalline by the outstretched arm of defender Torsten Frings. Dallas defended his decision on the grounds that Frings did not intend to handle the ball, commenting "If it's not intentional it's not a foul, no matter where it is." In the same match Dallas cautioned Oliver Neuville for a foul committed by his teammate Jens Jeremies, having mistaken their identities. Dallas had the backing of his refereeing inspector over the incident, although FIFA remarked upon their "concern [at] one or two major mistakes" during the tournament.

Dallas was selected as fourth official for the Final between Brazil and Germany. According to Dallas, the Brazilian players insisted he join them following their celebratory team huddle dance around the World Cup trophy.

== As a referee instructor ==
Dallas retired as a match referee at the end of the 2004–05 Scottish football season, a year earlier than the mandatory retirement age. He then acted as a referee observer for the Scottish Premier League and was appointed to the UEFA Referees' Committee. Dallas was also appointed to a new Referee Certification Panel, one of two panels introduced in connection with UEFA's Referee Convention, while he continued his role as a UEFA referee observer.

Dallas was appointed Head of Referee Development by the Scottish Football Association in 2009. He was soon involved in a public dispute with Motherwell manager Jim Gannon over refereeing decisions. In February 2010, Dallas expressed disappointment at refereeing standards in the SPL, after several high-profile refereeing errors were made in a short period of time.

In November 2010, assistant referee Steven Craven accused Dallas of exerting pressure on him to support referee Dougie McDonald, who had lied about a disallowed penalty incident in a match at Tannadice Park. Dallas himself had initially publicly repeated McDonald's false version of events but denied allegations of "bullying and harassment". Dallas was supported personally by the SFA, though the body promised an overhaul of referee discipline.

Later in November 2010, Dallas faced an inquiry after it emerged that he had allegedly sent what has been described as a sectarian and offensive email referring to the Pope from his SFA email account. After journalist Phil Mac Giolla Bhain had broken the story, the SFA issued a statement on 10 November stating that an investigation would be carried out. On 24 November, the Roman Catholic Church in Scotland wrote to the SFA demanding that they remove Dallas from his position if the allegation was proved. Dallas was sacked by the SFA on 26 November, after chief executive Stewart Regan had concluded the investigation into the allegations. Four other SFA employees were also sacked; three of whom were later reinstated. Dallas planned to sue the SFA for unfair dismissal, but the case was settled before it reached court.

After Dallas was sacked there was concern from referees in Scotland that standards of officiating could drop. Fifa listed Scottish referee Craig Thomson said, "I see him as a world-class individual within Scottish football, There is a lot of work behind the scenes that I'm hoping won't be lost." Referee John McKendrick said, "It's certainly a major blow for Scottish refereeing, At the peak of his game, there are very few figures in Scottish football who have been at the level Hugh Dallas was at."

In August 2014, he was appointed Chief Refereeing Officer in Super League Greece. In November 2014, he criticised the arbitration of Ilias Spathas (one of the many refs involved in the 2015 Greek football scandal), after a match of Olympiakos, as the "worst he has ever seen" saying that the mistakes were not normal. A few days later he quit from being responsible for the appointments of refereeing officials for Super League and Football League matches.

In June 2022, Dallas was appointed as the Referee Training Consultant for TFF's Arbitration Committee. He gave an interview to Turkish news agency Anadolu Agency on 19 August 2022, in which he stated that the quality of refereeing in the Turkish Super League was high and stated that he aimed to contribute to this by minimising referee errors. In the interview, he also added that after every match, he talks to the referees and makes video calls and creates online meetings for their development.

On 1 March 2024, a video call that Dallas had made with the referees of the Turkish Super League Galatasaray v Antalyaspor match played on 26 February 2024 regarding the mistakes made during the encounter was leaked to the public. The footage allegedly showing conversations between Dallas and referee Abdülkadir Bitigen, in which Dallas confronted the two referees, main referee Bitigen and VAR referee Özgür Yankaya who had officiated the match why they had made such decisions drew great reaction on social media. Dallas argued that the decisions made by the referees were wrong and asked the VAR referee Yankaya: "Why did you call the referee and put him under pressure for such a simple contact?" and main referee Bitigen: "A week later, do you still think it was a foul?", a question which Bitigen would make the following reply: "I think it was a simple contact, I don't think it was a penalty." Yankaya, would also go on to state that he had made a mistake by giving a penalty and also said that when Bitigen said he didn't see the position, he felt to need to analyse it, adding that he was still questioning why he did what he did. At the end of the footage leaked to the public, Dallas was quoted as saying, "We don't give simple penalties even if there is a little contact."

== Outside football ==
Dallas was sacked in 2010 for his involvement in circulating an offensive email about the Pope. The email, which joked about Pope Benedict XVI’s 2010 visit to Scotland, led to disciplinary action and a subsequent legal settlement between Dallas and the SFA. https://www.theguardian.com/football/2010/nov/26/hugh-dallas-scottish-refereeing-exit

Dallas was the managing director of his own window and construction company, until it went into receivership in 2002.

Dallas was appointed Member of the Most Excellent Order of the British Empire (MBE) in the 2003 New Year Honours for services to football.

As discovered by TV show Fantasy Football League, Dallas was once a contestant on Family Fortunes. Dallas has also worked as an after-dinner speaker.

His son Andrew is also a referee.

Dallas replaced Pierluigi Collina at Soccer Aid 2008, after Collina was injured.

Scottish band Mogwai named a song after Dallas which was included in the 2014 re-release of Come On Die Young.

Preceded by UEFA Cup Final 1998 (Spain) Antonio López Nieto	UEFA Cup Final Referees; Final 1999 (Scotland) Hugh Dallas	Succeeded by UEFA Cup Final 2000 (Spain) Antonio López Nieto
