= Colin Cameron (footballer) =

Scottish association football player and manager

Personal information
- Full name: Colin Cameron
- Date of birth: 23 October 1972 (age 54)
- Place of birth: Kirkcaldy, Scotland
- Height: 5 ft 8 in (1.73 m)
- Position: Midfielder

Team information
- Current team: Raith Rovers (Assistant Manager)

Youth career
- 1988–1990: Raith Rovers

Senior career*
Years	Team	Apps	(Gls)
1990–1996	Raith Rovers	152	(32)
1991–1992	→ Sligo Rovers (loan)	9	(4)
1996–2001	Heart of Midlothian	157	(48)
2001–2006	Wolverhampton Wanderers	168	(23)
2006	→ Millwall (loan)	5	(0)
2006–2007	Coventry City	24	(2)
2007–2008	Milton Keynes Dons	29	(3)
2008–2010	Dundee	23	(0)
2009	→ Arbroath (loan)	3	(0)
2010–2013	Cowdenbeath	69	(3)
2014	Burntisland Shipyard (trialist)	1	(1)
2014–2015	Berwick Rangers	29	(1)
Total		669	(117)

International career
1999–2004	Scotland	28	(2)

Managerial career
- 2011–2013: Cowdenbeath
- 2014–2015: Berwick Rangers
- 2019: Airdrieonians (assistant)
- 2022–2025: Raith Rovers (assistant)
- * Club domestic league appearances and goals

Colin Cameron (born 23 October 1972) is a Scottish football manager and former professional player.

Cameron started his playing career with Raith Rovers. He was part of the Rovers side that won the Scottish League Cup in 1994, leading to the team's first and only foray in Europe, which included the memorable ties against German giants Bayern Munich. He also won two First Division championships with Raith, and won the Scottish Cup with Hearts in 1998.

Cameron made a £1.75m move to English club Wolves in 2001 and played for them in the Premier League. He was capped 28 times by Scotland, scoring twice. He made his international debut on 28 April 1999, in a 1–0 friendly win in Germany.

== Career ==
=== Raith Rovers ===
Cameron was brought up in the Links area of Kirkcaldy, very close to Stark's Park, the ground of Raith Rovers. He attended Balwearie High School in Kirkcaldy until December 1988 and then joined Raith Rovers. Cameron spent most of the 1991–92 season on loan to Irish side Sligo Rovers, before becoming a regular in the Raith side. He was part of the team who famously defeated Celtic on penalties to win the 1994–95 League Cup. The following season, he played in both legs of the 1995–96 UEFA Cup tie against Bayern Munich. Tasting two titles (and a relegation in-between), Cameron made just over 150 league appearances for Rovers before leaving in March 1996.

=== Heart of Midlothian ===
Cameron joined Hearts in a £400,000 exchange deal, with John Millar joining Raith as a make weight. Like his previous club, Cameron made just over 150 league appearances, becoming club captain. During his stay at Hearts, Cameron scored the opening goal in the 1998 Scottish Cup Final, which Hearts went on to win 2–1 against Rangers.

=== Wolverhampton Wanderers ===
Cameron moved to Wolves in a £1.75m deal in August 2001. Cameron was a fans' favourite at Wolves, mainly because of his effort and determination. With 23 goals in 168 appearances, Cameron was not a regular goalscorer but contributed some important goals, including the goal that gave the club their first ever Premier League victory in a 1–0 success over Manchester City, and Wolves never lost a match in which he scored. He was a first choice player throughout almost all his time there as he helped the side win promotion to the top flight via the playoffs in 2003, and played for a season at that level before spending two further seasons in the second tier attempting to win promotion back.

By 2006, Cameron's time at Molineux was over, not featuring in manager Glenn Hoddle's future plans at the club. He spent some time on loan to Millwall, before being recalled by Wolves – then in a faltering promotion campaign – and played in their final five games of the season. His performances gained him the support of many fans to remain at the club, but he was not offered a new contract and moved to fellow Championship team Coventry City on a free transfer in June 2006.

=== Coventry City ===
Cameron signed a one-year deal with Coventry City for the 2006–07 season. He appeared in most of Coventry's games in that season, although mostly as a substitute, scoring two league goals (both penalties), and one from open play in the FA Cup. He suffered an Achilles injury midway through the campaign and managed only two league games in the New Year, before being told he would be released.

=== Milton Keynes Dons ===
He had trials with League Two club Milton Keynes Dons, managed by his former Wolves teammate Paul Ince, and signed a contract for the 2007/08 season, establishing himself as a regular first team player and helping the Dons to lift both the Football League Trophy and the League Two title in that season. However, he was not retained by the club after this campaign.

=== Dundee ===
Cameron returned to his native Scotland in July 2008, signing for Dundee, at the time managed by another former Wolves teammate, Alex Rae. After being plagued by constant knee trouble, Cameron's debut for the club came in a closed door game against Albion Rovers at Cliftonhill which Dundee won 2–1. In early November, Cameron again injured his left knee and had to spend around four months on the sidelines following a subsequent operation. To help to get him back to full fitness for his long-awaited return to the Dundee first team and to aid his recovery from the trouble, new manager Jocky Scott confirmed on 8 January 2009 that Cameron had joined Second Division side Arbroath on a month's loan deal. Upon his return to Dundee Cameron scored his first goal for the club against Stranraer in the Scottish League Cup. He was released by the club on 4 May 2010 along with eight other players.

=== Cowdenbeath ===
In 2010 Cameron linked up with his former Raith Rovers manager Jimmy Nicholl at Cowdenbeath taking up the assistant manager role, while also remaining a player.

On 6 June 2011 Cameron was named the new player-manager of Cowdenbeath, after Nicholl left for Kilmarnock. Cameron led the Blue Brazil to the Second Division championship in his first season in charge, finishing eight points ahead of Arbroath. He left the club by mutual consent in November 2013, as the club struggled during the early part of the 2013–14 season.

=== Berwick Rangers ===
Following the sacking of Ian Little, Cameron was appointed player-manager of Berwick Rangers on 14 January 2014. He held this position until October 2015, when he was sacked after a 4–1 defeat by Montrose.

In July 2014, Cameron joined Edusport Academy as a coach.

Cameron joined Airdrieonians as assistant manager in October 2019 and left after a couple of months in the role.

== Career statistics ==
Scotland
Year	Apps	Goals
1999	3	1
2000	6	0
2001	5	1
2002	1	0
2003	8	0
2004	5	0
Total	28	2

Scores and results list Scotland's goal tally first.

No.	Date	Venue	Opponent	Score	Result	Competition
1	9 October 1999	Hampden Park, Glasgow	Lithuania	3–0	3–0	UEFA Euro 2000 qualifying
2	28 March 2001	Hampden Park, Glasgow	San Marino	4–0	4–0	2002 FIFA World Cup qualifying

== Honours ==
Raith Rovers

- Scottish First Division: 1992–93, 1994–95
- Scottish League Cup: 1994–95

Heart of Midlothian

- Scottish Cup: 1997–98

Wolverhampton Wanderers

- Football League First Division play-offs: 2003

Milton Keynes Dons

- Football League Two: 2007–08
- Football League Trophy: 2007–08

Dundee

- Scottish Challenge Cup: 2009–10
