= Thomas Flögel =

Austrian footballer and manager

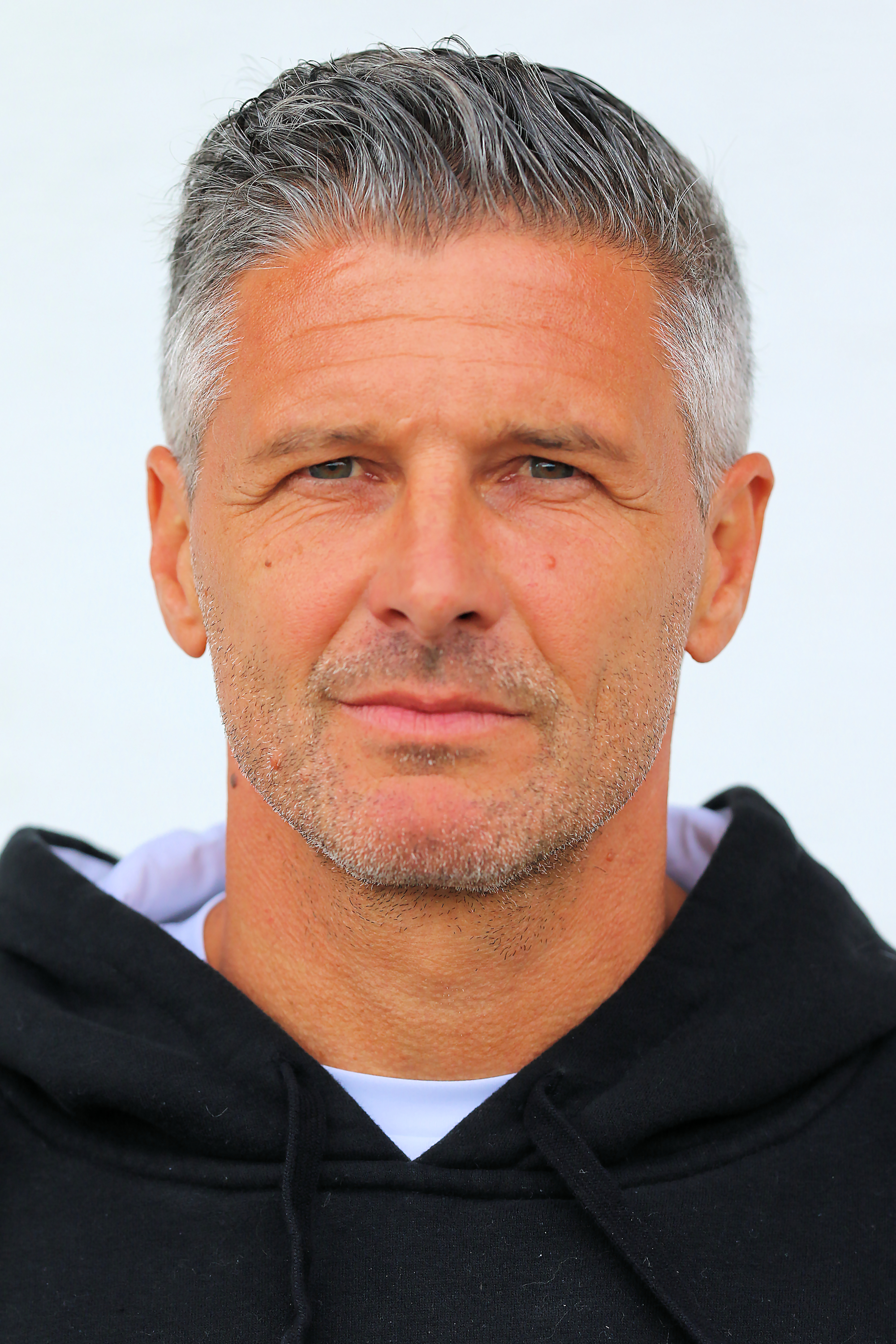
- Flögel in 2019

Personal information
- Date of birth: 7 June 1971 (age 55)
- Place of birth: Vienna, Austria
- Height: 5 ft 10 in (1.78 m)
- Position: Midfielder

Team information
- Current team: Vienna FC (Sporting director)

Youth career
- 1987–1990: Austria Wien

Senior career*
Years	Team	Apps	(Gls)
1990–1997	Austria Wien	248	(43)
1997–2002	Hearts	137	(10)
2002–2004	Austria Wien	53	(2)
2004–2005	Pasching	24	(0)
2005–2006	Admira Wacker	25	(1)
2006	Vienna FC	3	(0)

International career
1992–2003	Austria	37	(3)

Managerial career
- 2014–2015: SC Wienerberg Jugend
- 2015: Floridsdorfer AC Jugend
- 2015: Floridsdorfer AC II
- 2015–2016: Floridsdorfer AC (interim manager)
- 2017–: SKN St. Pölten II
- * Club domestic league appearances and goals

Thomas Flögel (born 7 June 1971) is an Austrian football manager and former player.

== Club career ==
Born in Vienna and the son of former Rapid Wien player Rudi Flögel, Flögel began his career with their local rivals Austria Wien. He made his first-team break-through in 1990 and spent the next seven seasons at the Franz Horr Stadium. During this time, the Violets won three consecutive League titles (1991–93) and the Austrian Cup in 1992 and 1994. However, after a lean spell in the mid-1990s, during which FK Austria were overshadowed by SV Salzburg, Flögel decided to try playing abroad, eventually signing for Scottish side Heart of Midlothian in 1997, after a trial with Dundee United.

=== Heart of Midlothian ===
Flögel enjoyed instant success with the Edinburgh club, helping them end a 36-year trophy drought by winning the Scottish Cup in 1998. Although initially considered a midfielder, Flögel displayed great versatility during his time with Hearts, and played in every outfield position during a five season-spell at Tynecastle.

=== Back in Austria ===
In 2002, Flögel returned to former club FK Austria, who were buoyed by significant investment from billionaire Frank Stronach, and won the Double in his first season back in Vienna. FK Austria's new financial clout ensured fierce competition for first-team places though, and after struggling to maintain his place in the team in 2004, Flögel moved to SV Pasching.

Flögel wound down his career with season-long spells with Pasching (2004–05) and VfB Admira Wacker Mödling (2005–06). He had intended to spend a final year playing for First Vienna, however a serious shoulder injury in only his third game for the side forced his retirement. On 4 September 2006, he was announced as First Vienna's new sporting director.

== International career ==
Flögel achieved international recognition while playing for Austria Wien, making his Austria debut in a 4–0 win over Lithuania in 1992. After being left in the international wilderness for five years (from 1995–2000), his consistent form with Hearts earned him a recall to the Austria national side and he increased his cap tally to 37, in which time he scored three goals.
