= Stéphane Adam =

French footballer (born 1969)

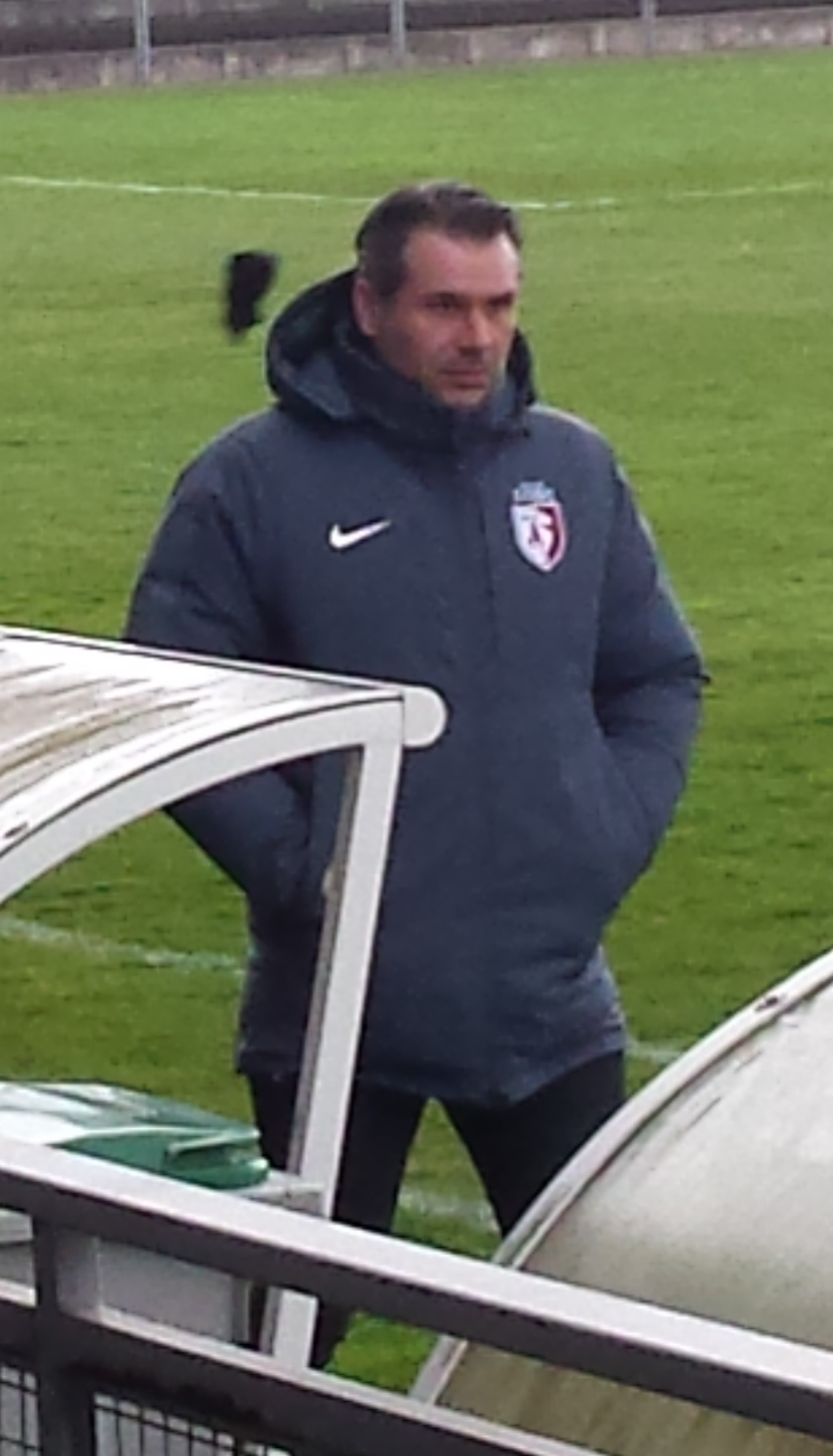
- Adam in 2015

Personal information
- Full name: Stéphane Lucien Adam
- Date of birth: 14 May 1969 (age 57)
- Place of birth: Lille, France
- Height: 1.83 m (6 ft 0 in)
- Position: Striker

Senior career*
| Years | Team | Apps | (Gls) |
| 1988–1989 | Lille | | |
| 1989–1991 | Louhans-Cuiseaux | 32 | (8) |
| 1991–1992 | Orléans | | |
| 1992–1993 | Créteil | 31 | (16) |
| 1993–1995 | Amiens | | |
| 1995–1997 | Metz | 40 | (4) |
| 1997–2001 | Heart of Midlothian | 108 | (28) |

Managerial career
- 2013–2015: Lille B
- * Club domestic league appearances and goals

Stéphane Lucien Adam (born 14 May 1969) is a French former professional footballer who played as a striker.

== Career ==
Born in Lille, Adam was a forward who played for hometown Lille, Orléans, Créteil, Amiens and Metz in the French league. While at Metz he played as a substitute in the final as they won the 1995–96 Coupe de la Ligue. He then joined Heart of Midlothian in the Scottish Premier Division where notably he scored the second goal in their 2–1 victory over Rangers in the 1998 Scottish Cup Final. Adam made a total of 145 appearances and scored 33 goals for Hearts.

After retiring in 2002 he became a coach, previously with Kilmarnock and later with Lille.
