= Netherlands at the UEFA European Championship =

International football delegation

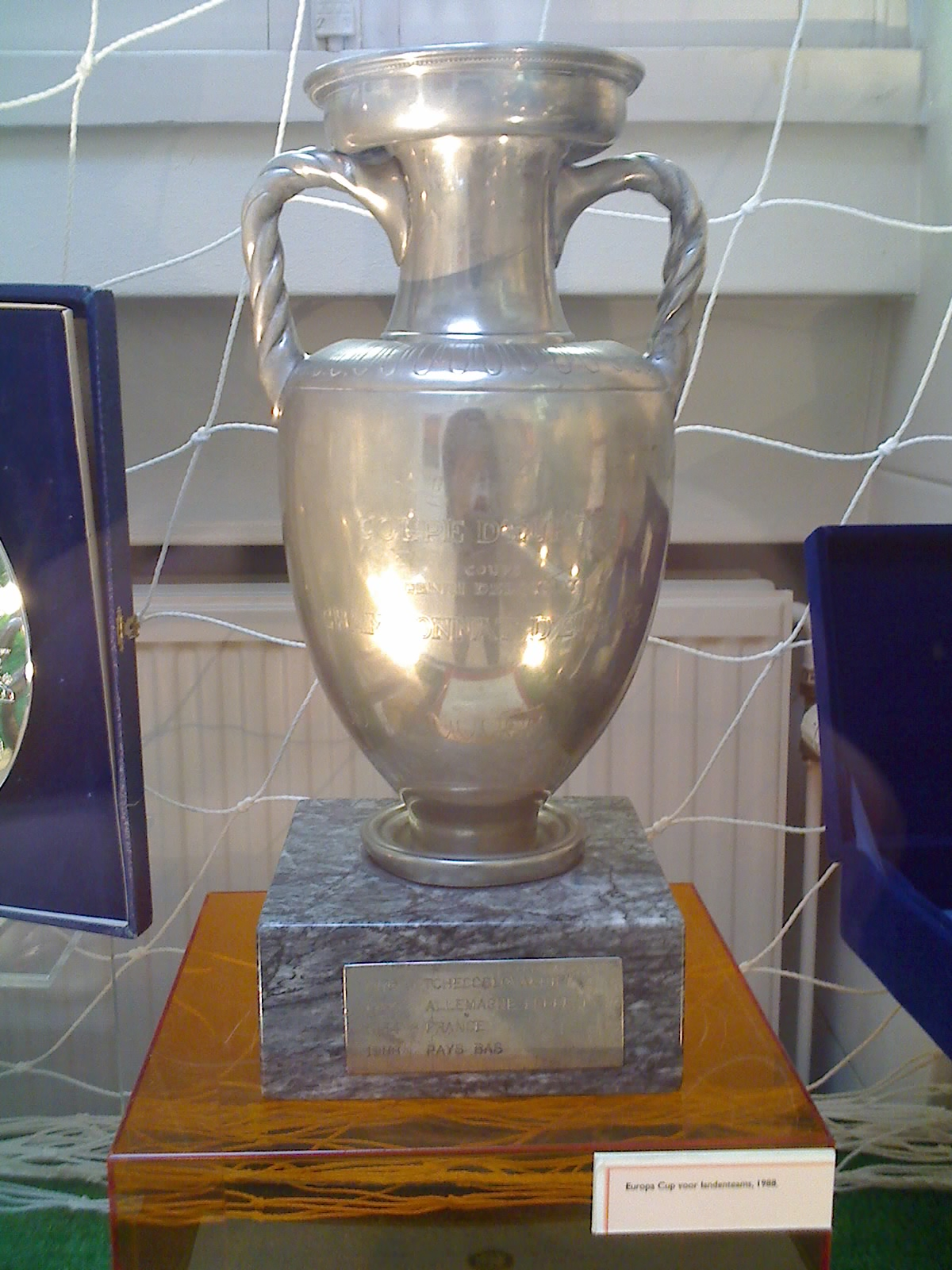
The 1988 trophy on display in Amsterdam

The Netherlands national football team has appeared in eleven UEFA European Championship tournaments. The team did not enter the first tournament during Euro 1960 and failed to qualify for Euro 1964, Euro 1968 and Euro 1972.

The Netherlands' first appearance in the UEFA European Championship was at Euro 1976. During qualification they won their group ahead of Poland and Italy, and then defeated Belgium. During the four-team final tournament, they lost the semi-finals to Czechoslovakia, and then defeated Yugoslavia in the third place play-off match. They qualified for Euro 1980 over Poland and East Germany. Despite an opening match win against Greece, a loss to West Germany and a draw with Czechoslovakia kept them from advancing past the group stage. They failed to reach Euro 1984 despite finishing level on points with Spain during qualification.

The Netherlands qualified for Euro 1988 with wins over Greece, Hungary and Poland. During the final tournament group stage, they lost to the Soviet Union, and then went on to defeat England and the Republic of Ireland. In the semi-finals, they defeated hosts Germany 2–1, and then beat the Soviet Union 2–0 in the final to become 1988 champions. In the build-up for Euro 1992, the Netherlands qualified ahead of Portugal and Greece. In the group stage, they defeated Scotland and Germany, and drew with the CIS. They then lost to eventual champions Denmark in the semi-finals after a 2–2 draw, which was decided by a penalty shoot-out. The Netherlands finished behind the Czech Republic, and qualified for Euro 1996 via a play-off against the Republic of Ireland. In the tournament, they drew with Scotland, beat Switzerland and then lost 4–1 to England; they went on to lose in a penalty shoot-out in the quarter-finals to France after a 0–0 draw in regulation.

As co-hosts with Belgium, the Netherlands automatically qualified for Euro 2000. They won all of their group stage matches, against the Czech Republic, Denmark and France. In the quarter-finals, they defeated Yugoslavia 6–1, only to lose in the semi-finals after a 0–0 draw in a penalty shoot-out against Italy. The Netherlands finished behind the Czech Republic, and qualified for Euro 2004 via a play-off against Scotland. They opened their tournament match with a draw against Germany, then a loss to the Czech Republic and a win over Latvia. In the quarter-finals, they won in a penalty shoot-out against Sweden before losing the semi-finals to hosts Portugal 2–1. They finished second after Romania to qualify for Euro 2008; the Netherlands opened with three wins: 3–0 against Italy, 4–1 over France and 2–0 against Romania. In the quarter-finals, they lost 3–1 after extra time to Russia. Qualifying ahead of Sweden for Euro 2012, the Netherlands lost all three group stage matches: to Denmark, Germany and Portugal. The Netherlands failed to reach Euro 2016 after losses in qualifying to the Czech Republic, Turkey and Iceland.

Euro 2020 saw the Netherlands qualify behind Germany; they won all group stage matches against Ukraine, Austria and North Macedonia. In the round of 16, they lost 2–0 to the Czech Republic. The Netherlands finished behind France to qualify for Euro 2024; they opened with a win over Poland, followed by a draw against France and a loss to Austria. In the round of 16 they defeated Romania 3–0, followed by a 2–1 quarter-final win against Turkey. In the semi-finals, they lost to England 2–1.

== Overall record ==
UEFA European Championship record										Qualification record					
Year	Round	Position	Pld	W	D	L	GF	GA	Squad	Pld	W	D	L	GF	GA
(France) 1960	Did not enter									Did not enter					
(Spain) 1964	Did not qualify									4	1	2	1	6	5
(Italy) 1968	Did not qualify									6	2	1	3	11	11
(Belgium) 1972	Did not qualify									6	3	1	2	18	6
(Socialist Federal Republic of Yugoslavia) 1976	Third place	3rd	2	1	0	1	4	5	Squad	8	6	0	2	21	9
(Italy) 1980	Group stage	5th	3	1	1	1	4	4	Squad	8	6	1	1	20	6
(France) 1984	Did not qualify									8	6	1	1	22	6
(West Germany) 1988	Champions	1st	5	4	0	1	8	3	Squad	8	6	2	0	15	1
(Sweden) 1992	Semi-finals	4th	4	2	2	0	6	3	Squad	8	6	1	1	17	2
(England) 1996	Quarter-finals	8th	4	1	2	1	3	4	Squad	11	7	2	2	25	5
(Belgium) (Netherlands) 2000	Semi-finals	4th	5	4	1	0	13	3	Squad	Qualified as co-hosts					
(Portugal) 2004	Semi-finals	4th	5	1	2	2	7	6	Squad	10	7	1	2	26	7
(Austria) (Switzerland) 2008	Quarter-finals	6th	4	3	0	1	10	4	Squad	12	8	2	2	15	5
(Poland) (Ukraine) 2012	Group stage	15th	3	0	0	3	2	5	Squad	10	9	0	1	37	8
(France) 2016	Did not qualify									10	4	1	5	17	14
(Europe) 2020	Round of 16	9th	4	3	0	1	8	4	Squad	8	6	1	1	24	7
(Germany) 2024	Semi-finals	4th	6	3	1	2	10	7	Squad	8	6	0	2	17	7
(United Kingdom) (Republic of Ireland) 2028	To be determined									To be determined					
(Italy) (Turkey) 2032	To be determined									To be determined					
Total	1 Title	11/17	45	23	9	13	75	48	—	125	83	16	26	291	99

== List of matches ==
Year	Round	Opponent	Score	Result	Venue	Netherlands scorers
1976	Semi-finals	Czechoslovakia	1–3 (a.e.t.)	L	Zagreb	Ondruš (o.g.)
1976	Third place play-off	Yugoslavia	3–2 (a.e.t.)	W	Zagreb	Geels (2), W. van de Kerkhof
1980	Group stage	Greece	1–0	W	Naples	Kist
1980	Group stage	West Germany	2–3	L	Naples	Rep, W. van de Kerkhof
1980	Group stage	Czechoslovakia	1–1	D	Milan	Kist
1988	Group stage	Soviet Union	0–1	L	Cologne	—
1988	Group stage	England	3–1	W	Düsseldorf	Van Basten (3)
1988	Group stage	Republic of Ireland	1–0	W	Gelsenkirchen	Kieft
1988	Semi-finals	West Germany	2–1	W	Hamburg	Koeman, Van Basten
1988	Final	Soviet Union	2–0	W	Munich	Gullit, Van Basten
1992	Group stage	Scotland	1–0	W	Gothenburg	Bergkamp
1992	Group stage	CIS	0–0	D	Gothenburg	—
1992	Group stage	Germany	3–1	W	Gothenburg	Rijkaard, Witschge, Bergkamp
1992	Semi-finals	Denmark	2–2 (a.e.t.) (4–5 p)	D	Gothenburg	Bergkamp, Rijkaard
1996	Group stage	Scotland	0–0	D	Birmingham	—
1996	Group stage	Switzerland	2–0	W	Birmingham	Cruyff, Bergkamp
1996	Group stage	England	1–4	L	London	Kluivert
1996	Quarter-finals	France	0–0 (a.e.t.) (4–5 p)	D	Liverpool	—
2000	Group stage	Czech Republic	1–0	W	Amsterdam	F. de Boer
2000	Group stage	Denmark	3–0	W	Rotterdam	Kluivert, R. de Boer, Zenden
2000	Group stage	France	3–2	W	Amsterdam	Kluivert, F. de Boer, Zenden
2000	Quarter-finals	FR Yugoslavia	6–1	W	Rotterdam	Kluivert (3), Govedarica (o.g.), Overmars (2)
2000	Semi-finals	Italy	0–0 (a.e.t.) (1–3 p)	D	Amsterdam	—
2004	Group stage	Germany	1–1	D	Porto	Van Nistelrooy
2004	Group stage	Czech Republic	2–3	L	Aveiro	Bouma, Van Nistelrooy
2004	Group stage	Latvia	3–0	W	Braga	Van Nistelrooy (2), Makaay
2004	Quarter-finals	Sweden	0–0 (a.e.t.) (5–4 p)	D	Faro	—
2004	Semi-finals	Portugal	1–2	L	Lisbon	Andrade (o.g.)
2008	Group stage	Italy	3–0	W	Bern	Van Nistelrooy, Sneijder, Van Bronckhorst
2008	Group stage	France	4–1	W	Bern	Kuyt, Van Persie, Robben, Sneijder
2008	Group stage	Romania	2–0	W	Bern	Huntelaar, Van Persie
2008	Quarter-finals	Russia	1–3 (a.e.t.)	L	Basel	Van Nistelrooy
2012	Group stage	Denmark	0–1	L	Kharkiv	—
2012	Group stage	Germany	1–2	L	Kharkiv	Van Persie
2012	Group stage	Portugal	1–2	L	Kharkiv	Van der Vaart
2020	Group stage	Ukraine	3–2	W	Amsterdam	Wijnaldum, Weghorst, Dumfries
2020	Group stage	Austria	2–0	W	Amsterdam	Depay, Dumfries
2020	Group stage	North Macedonia	3–0	W	Amsterdam	Depay, Wijnaldum (2)
2020	Round of 16	Czech Republic	0–2	L	Budapest	—
2024	Group stage	Poland	2–1	W	Hamburg	Gakpo, Weghorst
2024	Group stage	France	0–0	D	Leipzig	—
2024	Group stage	Austria	2–3	L	Berlin	Gakpo, Depay
2024	Round of 16	Romania	3–0	W	Munich	Gakpo, Malen (2)
2024	Quarter-finals	Turkey	2–1	W	Berlin	De Vrij, Müldür (o.g.)
2024	Semi-finals	England	1–2	L	Dortmund	Simons

== Head-to-head record ==
Opponent	Pld	W	D	L	GF	GA
Austria	2	1	0	1	4	3
CIS	1	0	1	0	0	0
Czech Republic	3	1	0	2	3	5
Czechoslovakia	2	0	1	1	2	4
Denmark	3	1	1	1	5	3
England	3	1	0	2	5	7
France	4	2	2	0	7	3
FR Yugoslavia	1	1	0	0	6	1
Germany	5	2	1	2	9	8
Greece	1	1	0	0	1	0
Italy	2	1	1	0	3	0
Latvia	1	1	0	0	3	0
North Macedonia	1	1	0	0	3	0
Republic of Ireland	1	1	0	0	1	0
Romania	2	2	0	0	5	0
Poland	1	1	0	0	2	1
Portugal	2	0	0	2	2	4
Russia	1	0	0	1	1	3
Scotland	2	1	1	0	1	0
Soviet Union	2	1	0	1	2	1
Sweden	1	0	1	0	0	0
Switzerland	1	1	0	0	2	0
Turkey	1	1	0	0	2	1
Ukraine	1	1	0	0	3	2
Yugoslavia	1	1	0	0	3	2
Total	45	23	9	13	75	48

== Euro 1976 ==
=== Final tournament ===
Semi-finals

16 June 1976
20:15

Czechoslovakia	3–1 (a.e.t.)	Netherlands
Ondruš 19'; Nehoda 114'; Veselý 118'	Report	Ondruš 73' (o.g.)

Stadion Maksimir, Zagreb
Attendance: 17,879
Referee: Clive Thomas (Wales)

Third place play-off

19 June 1976
20:15

Netherlands	3–2 (a.e.t.)	Yugoslavia
Geels 27', 107'; W. van de Kerkhof 39'	Report	Katalinski 43'; Džajić 82'

Stadion Maksimir, Zagreb
Attendance: 6,766
Referee: Walter Hungerbühler (Switzerland)

== Euro 1980 ==
=== Group stage ===
Pos	Team	Pld	W	D	L	GF	GA	GD	Pts	Qualification
1	West Germany	3	2	1	0	4	2	+2	5	Advance to final
2	Czechoslovakia	3	1	1	1	4	3	+1	3	Advance to third place play-off
3	Netherlands	3	1	1	1	4	4	0	3	
4	Greece	3	0	1	2	1	4	−3	1	

Source: UEFA
Rules for classification: Group stage tiebreakers
11 June 1980
20:30

Netherlands	1–0	Greece
Kist 65' (pen.)	Report

Stadio San Paolo, Naples
Attendance: 14,990
Referee: Adolf Prokop (East Germany)

14 June 1980
17:45

West Germany	3–2	Netherlands
Allofs 20', 60', 65'	Report	Rep 79' (pen.); W. van de Kerkhof 85'

Stadio San Paolo, Naples
Attendance: 29,889
Referee: Robert Wurtz (France)

17 June 1980
17:45

Netherlands	1–1	Czechoslovakia
Kist 59'	Report	Nehoda 16'

San Siro, Milan
Attendance: 11,889
Referee: Hilmi Ok (Turkey)

== Euro 1988 ==
=== Group stage ===
Pos	Team	Pld	W	D	L	GF	GA	GD	Pts	Qualification
1	Soviet Union	3	2	1	0	5	2	+3	5	Advance to knockout stage
2	Netherlands	3	2	0	1	4	2	+2	4	Advance to knockout stage
3	Republic of Ireland	3	1	1	1	2	2	0	3	
4	England	3	0	0	3	2	7	−5	0	

Source: UEFA
Rules for classification: Group stage tiebreakers
12 June 1988
20:15

Netherlands	0–1	Soviet Union
	Report	Rats 52'

Müngersdorfer Stadion, Cologne
Attendance: 54,336
Referee: Dieter Pauly (West Germany)

15 June 1988
17:15

England	1–3	Netherlands
Robson 53'	Report	Van Basten 44', 71', 75'

Rheinstadion, Düsseldorf
Attendance: 63,940
Referee: Paolo Casarin (Italy)

18 June 1988
15:30

Republic of Ireland	0–1	Netherlands
	Report	Kieft 82'

Parkstadion, Gelsenkirchen
Attendance: 64,731
Referee: Horst Brummeier (Austria)

=== Knockout stage ===
Semi-finals

21 June 1988
20:15

West Germany	1–2	Netherlands
Matthäus 55' (pen.)	Report	R. Koeman 74' (pen.); Van Basten 88'

Volksparkstadion, Hamburg
Attendance: 56,115
Referee: Ioan Igna (Romania)

Final

25 June 1988
15:30

Soviet Union	0–2	Netherlands
	Report	Gullit 32'; Van Basten 53'

Olympiastadion, Munich
Attendance: 62,770
Referee: Michel Vautrot (France)

== Euro 1992 ==
=== Group stage ===
Pos	Team	Pld	W	D	L	GF	GA	GD	Pts	Qualification
1	Netherlands	3	2	1	0	4	1	+3	5	Advance to knockout stage
2	Germany	3	1	1	1	4	4	0	3	Advance to knockout stage
3	Scotland	3	1	0	2	3	3	0	2	
4	CIS	3	0	2	1	1	4	−3	2	

Source: UEFA
Rules for classification: Group stage tiebreakers
12 June 1992
17:15

Netherlands	1–0	Scotland
Bergkamp 75'	Report

Ullevi, Gothenburg
Attendance: 35,720
Referee: Bo Karlsson (Sweden)

15 June 1992
20:15

Netherlands	0–0	CIS
	Report

Ullevi, Gothenburg
Attendance: 34,440
Referee: Peter Mikkelsen (Denmark)

18 June 1992
20:15

Netherlands	3–1	Germany
Rijkaard 4'; Witschge 15'; Bergkamp 72'	Report	Klinsmann 53'

Ullevi, Gothenburg
Attendance: 37,725
Referee: Pierluigi Pairetto (Italy)

=== Knockout stage ===
Semi-finals

22 June 1992
20:15

Netherlands	2–2 (a.e.t.)	Denmark
Bergkamp 23'; Rijkaard 86'	Report	Larsen 5', 33'
Penalties
Koeman (penalty scored); Van Basten (penalty missed); Bergkamp (penalty scored); Rijkaard (penalty scored); Witschge (penalty scored)	4–5	(penalty scored) Larsen; (penalty scored) Povlsen; (penalty scored) Elstrup; (penalty scored) Vilfort; (penalty scored) Christofte

Ullevi, Gothenburg
Attendance: 37,450
Referee: Emilio Soriano Aladrén (Spain)

== Euro 1996 ==
=== Group stage ===
Pos	Team	Pld	W	D	L	GF	GA	GD	Pts	Qualification
1	England (H)	3	2	1	0	7	2	+5	7	Advance to knockout stage
2	Netherlands	3	1	1	1	3	4	−1	4 (Note: Tied on head-to-head result (Netherlands 0–0 Scotland) and overall goal difference (−1). Overall goals for was used as the tiebreaker.)	Advance to knockout stage
3	Scotland	3	1	1	1	1	2	−1	4	
4	Switzerland	3	0	1	2	1	4	−3	1	

Source: UEFA
Rules for classification: Group stage tiebreakers
(H) Hosts
Notes:
10 June 1996
16:30

Netherlands	0–0	Scotland
	Report

Villa Park, Birmingham
Attendance: 34,363
Referee: Leif Sundell (Sweden)

13 June 1996
19:30

Switzerland	0–2	Netherlands
	Report	Cruyff 66'; Bergkamp 79'

Villa Park, Birmingham
Attendance: 36,800
Referee: Atanas Uzunov (Bulgaria)

18 June 1996
19:30

Netherlands	1–4	England
Kluivert 78'	Report	Shearer 23' (pen.), 57'; Sheringham 51', 62'

Wembley Stadium, London
Attendance: 76,798
Referee: Gerd Grabher (Austria)

=== Knockout stage ===
Quarter-finals

22 June 1996
18:30

France	0–0 (a.e.t.)	Netherlands
	Report
Penalties
Zidane (penalty scored); Djorkaeff (penalty scored); Lizarazu (penalty scored); Guérin (penalty scored); Blanc (penalty scored)	5–4	(penalty scored) De Kock; (penalty scored) De Boer; (penalty scored) Kluivert; (penalty missed) Seedorf; (penalty scored) Blind

Anfield, Liverpool
Attendance: 37,465
Referee: Antonio López Nieto (Spain)

== Euro 2000 ==
=== Group stage ===
Pos	Team	Pld	W	D	L	GF	GA	GD	Pts	Qualification
1	Netherlands (H)	3	3	0	0	7	2	+5	9	Advance to knockout stage
2	France	3	2	0	1	7	4	+3	6	Advance to knockout stage
3	Czech Republic	3	1	0	2	3	3	0	3	
4	Denmark	3	0	0	3	0	8	−8	0	

Source: UEFA
Rules for classification: Group stage tiebreakers
(H) Hosts
11 June 2000
20:45

Netherlands	1–0	Czech Republic
F. de Boer 89' (pen.)	Report

Amsterdam Arena, Amsterdam
Attendance: 50,800
Referee: Pierluigi Collina (Italy)

16 June 2000
20:45

Denmark	0–3	Netherlands
	Report	Kluivert 57'; R. de Boer 66'; Zenden 77'

Feijenoord Stadion, Rotterdam
Attendance: 51,425
Referee: Urs Meier (Switzerland)

21 June 2000
20:45

France	2–3	Netherlands
Dugarry 8'; Trezeguet 31'	Report	Kluivert 14'; F. de Boer 51'; Zenden 59'

Amsterdam Arena, Amsterdam
Attendance: 50,000
Referee: Anders Frisk (Sweden)

=== Knockout stage ===
Quarter-finals

25 June 2000
18:00

Netherlands	6–1	FR Yugoslavia
Kluivert 24', 38', 54'; Govedarica 51' (o.g.); Overmars 78', 90+1'	Report	Milošević 90+2'

Feijenoord Stadion, Rotterdam
Attendance: 44,000
Referee: José María García-Aranda (Spain)

Semi-finals

29 June 2000
18:00

Italy	0–0 (a.e.t.)	Netherlands
	Report
Penalties
Di Biagio (penalty scored); Pessotto (penalty scored); Totti (penalty scored); Maldini (penalty missed)	3–1	(penalty missed) F. de Boer; (penalty missed) Stam; (penalty scored) Kluivert; (penalty missed) Bosvelt

Amsterdam Arena, Amsterdam
Attendance: 50,000
Referee: Markus Merk (Germany)

== Euro 2004 ==
=== Group stage ===
Pos	Team	Pld	W	D	L	GF	GA	GD	Pts	Qualification
1	Czech Republic	3	3	0	0	7	4	+3	9	Advance to knockout stage
2	Netherlands	3	1	1	1	6	4	+2	4	Advance to knockout stage
3	Germany	3	0	2	1	2	3	−1	2	
4	Latvia	3	0	1	2	1	5	−4	1	

Source: UEFA
Rules for classification: Group stage tiebreakers
15 June 2004
19:45

Germany	1–1	Netherlands
Frings 30'	Report	Van Nistelrooy 81'

Estádio do Dragão, Porto
Attendance: 48,197
Referee: Anders Frisk (Sweden)

19 June 2004
19:45

Netherlands	2–3	Czech Republic
Bouma 4'; Van Nistelrooy 19'	Report	Koller 23'; Baroš 71'; Šmicer 88'

Estádio Municipal de Aveiro, Aveiro
Attendance: 29,935
Referee: Manuel Mejuto González (Spain)

23 June 2004
19:45

Netherlands	3–0	Latvia
Van Nistelrooy 27' (pen.), 35'; Makaay 84'	Report

Estádio Municipal de Braga, Braga
Attendance: 27,904
Referee: Kim Milton Nielsen (Denmark)

=== Knockout stage ===
Quarter-finals

26 June 2004
19:45

Sweden	0–0 (a.e.t.)	Netherlands
	Report
Penalties
Källström (penalty scored); Larsson (penalty scored); Ibrahimović (penalty missed); Ljungberg (penalty scored); Wilhelmsson (penalty scored); Mellberg (penalty missed)	4–5	(penalty scored) Van Nistelrooy; (penalty scored) Heitinga; (penalty scored) Reiziger; (penalty missed) Cocu; (penalty scored) Makaay; (penalty scored) Robben

Estádio Algarve, Faro/Loulé
Attendance: 27,762
Referee: Ľuboš Micheľ (Slovakia)

Semi-finals

30 June 2004
19:45

Portugal	2–1	Netherlands
Ronaldo 26'; Maniche 58'	Report	Andrade 63' (o.g.)

Estádio José Alvalade, Lisbon
Attendance: 46,679
Referee: Anders Frisk (Sweden)

== Euro 2008 ==
=== Group stage ===
Pos	Team	Pld	W	D	L	GF	GA	GD	Pts	Qualification
1	Netherlands	3	3	0	0	9	1	+8	9	Advance to knockout stage
2	Italy	3	1	1	1	3	4	−1	4	Advance to knockout stage
3	Romania	3	0	2	1	1	3	−2	2	
4	France	3	0	1	2	1	6	−5	1	

Source: UEFA
Rules for classification: Group stage tiebreakers
9 June 2008
20:45

Netherlands	3–0	Italy
Van Nistelrooy 26'; Sneijder 31'; Van Bronckhorst 79'	Report

Stade de Suisse, Bern
Attendance: 30,777
Referee: Peter Fröjdfeldt (Sweden)

13 June 2008
20:45

Netherlands	4–1	France
Kuyt 9'; Van Persie 59'; Robben 72'; Sneijder 90+2'	Report	Henry 71'

Stade de Suisse, Bern
Attendance: 30,777
Referee: Herbert Fandel (Germany)

17 June 2008
20:45

Netherlands	2–0	Romania
Huntelaar 54'; Van Persie 87'	Report

Stade de Suisse, Bern
Attendance: 30,777
Referee: Massimo Busacca (Switzerland)

=== Knockout stage ===
Quarter-finals

21 June 2008
20:45

Netherlands	1–3 (a.e.t.)	Russia
Van Nistelrooy 86'	Report	Pavlyuchenko 56'; Torbinski 112'; Arshavin 116'

St. Jakob-Park, Basel
Attendance: 38,374
Referee: Ľuboš Micheľ (Slovakia)

== Euro 2012 ==
=== Group stage ===
Pos	Team	Pld	W	D	L	GF	GA	GD	Pts	Qualification
1	Germany	3	3	0	0	5	2	+3	9	Advance to knockout stage
2	Portugal	3	2	0	1	5	4	+1	6	Advance to knockout stage
3	Denmark	3	1	0	2	4	5	−1	3	
4	Netherlands	3	0	0	3	2	5	−3	0	

Source: UEFA
Rules for classification: Group stage tiebreakers
9 June 2012
19:00 EEST

Netherlands	0–1	Denmark
	Report	Krohn-Dehli 24'

Metalist Stadium, Kharkiv
Attendance: 35,923
Referee: Damir Skomina (Slovenia)

13 June 2012
21:45 EEST

Netherlands	1–2	Germany
Van Persie 73'	Report	Gómez 24', 38'

Metalist Stadium, Kharkiv
Attendance: 37,750
Referee: Jonas Eriksson (Sweden)

17 June 2012
21:45 EEST

Portugal	2–1	Netherlands
Ronaldo 28', 74'	Report	Van der Vaart 11'

Metalist Stadium, Kharkiv
Attendance: 37,445
Referee: Nicola Rizzoli (Italy)

== Euro 2020 ==
=== Group stage ===
Pos	Team	Pld	W	D	L	GF	GA	GD	Pts	Qualification
1	Netherlands (H)	3	3	0	0	8	2	+6	9	Advance to knockout stage
2	Austria	3	2	0	1	4	3	+1	6	Advance to knockout stage
3	Ukraine	3	1	0	2	4	5	−1	3	Advance to knockout stage
4	North Macedonia	3	0	0	3	2	8	−6	0	

Source: UEFA
Rules for classification: Group stage tiebreakers
(H) Hosts
13 June 2021
21:00

Netherlands	3–2	Ukraine
Wijnaldum 52'; Weghorst 58'; Dumfries 85'	Report	Yarmolenko 75'; Yaremchuk 79'

Johan Cruyff Arena, Amsterdam
Attendance: 15,837
Referee: Felix Brych (Germany)

17 June 2021
21:00

Netherlands	2–0	Austria
Depay 11' (pen.); Dumfries 67'	Report

Johan Cruyff Arena, Amsterdam
Attendance: 15,243
Referee: Orel Grinfeld (Israel)

21 June 2021
18:00

North Macedonia	0–3	Netherlands
	Report	Depay 24'; Wijnaldum 50', 58'

Johan Cruyff Arena, Amsterdam
Attendance: 15,227
Referee: István Kovács (Romania)

=== Knockout stage ===
Round of 16

27 June 2021
18:00

Netherlands	0–2	Czech Republic
	Report	Holeš 68'; Schick 80'

Puskás Aréna, Budapest
Attendance: 52,834
Referee: Sergei Karasev (Russia)

== Euro 2024 ==
=== Group stage ===
Pos	Team	Pld	W	D	L	GF	GA	GD	Pts	Qualification
1	Austria	3	2	0	1	6	4	+2	6	Advance to knockout stage
2	France	3	1	2	0	2	1	+1	5	Advance to knockout stage
3	Netherlands	3	1	1	1	4	4	0	4	Advance to knockout stage
4	Poland	3	0	1	2	3	6	−3	1	

Source: UEFA
16 June 2024
15:00

Poland	1–2	Netherlands
Buksa 16'	Report	Gakpo 29'; Weghorst 83'

Volksparkstadion, Hamburg
Attendance: 48,117
Referee: Artur Soares Dias (Portugal)

21 June 2024
21:00

Netherlands	0–0	France
	Report

Red Bull Arena, Leipzig
Attendance: 38,531
Referee: Anthony Taylor (England)

25 June 2024
18:00

Netherlands	2–3	Austria
Gakpo 47'; Depay 75'	Report	Malen 6' (o.g.); Schmid 59'; Sabitzer 80'

Olympiastadion, Berlin
Attendance: 68,363
Referee: Ivan Kružliak (Slovakia)

Ranking of third-placed teams

Pos	Grp	Team	Pld	W	D	L	GF	GA	GD	Pts	Qualification
1	D	Netherlands	3	1	1	1	4	4	0	4 (Note: Disciplinary points: Netherlands −2, Georgia −6.)	Advance to knockout stage
2	F	Georgia	3	1	1	1	4	4	0	4	Advance to knockout stage
3	E	Slovakia	3	1	1	1	3	3	0	4	Advance to knockout stage
4	C	Slovenia	3	0	3	0	2	2	0	3	Advance to knockout stage
5	A	Hungary	3	1	0	2	2	5	−3	3	
6	B	Croatia	3	0	2	1	3	6	−3	2	

Source: UEFA
Rules for classification: 1) Points; 2) Goal difference; 3) Goals scored; 4) Wins; 5) Lower disciplinary points total; 6) European Qualifiers overall ranking (or drawing of lots, if hosts Germany had been involved in the tiebreaker).

=== Knockout stage ===
Round of 16

2 July 2024
18:00

Romania	0–3	Netherlands
	Report	Gakpo 20'; Malen 83', 90+3'

Allianz Arena, Munich
Attendance: 65,012
Referee: Felix Zwayer (Germany)

Quarter-finals

6 July 2024
21:00

Netherlands	2–1	Turkey
De Vrij 70'; Müldür 76' (o.g.)	Report	Akaydin 35'

Olympiastadion, Berlin
Attendance: 70,091
Referee: Clément Turpin (France)

Semi-finals

10 July 2024
21:00

Netherlands	1–2	England
Simons 7'	Report	Kane 18' (pen.); Watkins 90'

Westfalenstadion, Dortmund
Attendance: 60,926
Referee: Felix Zwayer (Germany)

== Most appearances ==
Rank	Player	Matches	Years
1	Edwin van der Sar	16	1996, 2000, 2004, 2008
2	Dennis Bergkamp	13	1992, 1996, 2000
2	Phillip Cocu	13	1996, 2000, 2004
4	Edgar Davids	12	1996, 2000, 2004
5	Giovanni van Bronckhorst	11	2000, 2004, 2008
6	Michael Reiziger	10	1996, 2000, 2004
6	Clarence Seedorf	10	1996, 2000, 2004
6	Memphis Depay	10	2020, 2024
6	Stefan de Vrij	10	2020, 2024
6	Wout Weghorst	10	2020, 2024

== Top goalscorers ==
Rank	Player	Goals	Years (goals)
1	Patrick Kluivert	6	1996 (1), 2000 (5), 2004
1	Ruud van Nistelrooy	6	2004 (4), 2008 (2)
3	Marco van Basten	5	1988
4	Dennis Bergkamp	4	1992 (3), 1996 (1)
5	Robin van Persie	3	2008 (2), 2012 (1)
5	Georginio Wijnaldum	3	2020
5	Memphis Depay	3	2020 (2), 2024 (1)
5	Cody Gakpo	3	2024

== See also ==
- Netherlands at the FIFA World Cup
