= Denmark at the UEFA European Championship =

International football delegation

The Denmark national football team have participated in ten UEFA European Championships, and won the tournament once. Their first tournament was the 1964 edition, in which they secured fourth place. In the final of UEFA Euro 1992 in Sweden, Denmark's 2–0 victory over Germany resulted in their first major tournament title.

== Overview ==
=== Overall record ===
UEFA European Championship record									Qualification record					
Year	Round	Position	Pld	W	D*	L	GF	GA	Pld	W	D*	L	GF	GA
(France) 1960	Did not qualify								2	0	1	1	3	7
(Spain) 1964	Fourth place	4th	2	0	0	2	1	6	7	4	2	1	19	8
(Italy) 1968	Did not qualify								6	1	1	4	6	16
(Belgium) 1972	Did not qualify								6	1	0	5	2	11
(Socialist Federal Republic of Yugoslavia) 1976	Did not qualify								6	0	1	5	3	14
(Italy) 1980	Did not qualify								8	1	2	5	13	17
(France) 1984	Semi-finals	3rd	4	2	1	1	9	4	8	6	1	1	17	5
(West Germany) 1988	Group stage	7th	3	0	0	3	2	7	6	3	2	1	4	2
(Sweden) 1992	Champions	1st	5	2	2	1	6	4	8	6	1	1	18	7
(England) 1996	Group stage	9th	3	1	1	1	4	4	10	6	3	1	19	9
(Belgium) (Netherlands) 2000	Group stage	16th	3	0	0	3	0	8	10	6	2	2	19	8
(Portugal) 2004	Quarter-finals	8th	4	1	2	1	4	5	8	4	3	1	15	9
(Austria) (Switzerland) 2008	Did not qualify								12	6	2	4	21	11
(Poland) (Ukraine) 2012	Group stage	12th	3	1	0	2	4	5	8	6	1	1	15	6
(France) 2016	Did not qualify								10	3	4	3	11	9
(Europe) 2020	Semi-finals	4th	6	3	0	3	12	7	8	4	4	0	23	6
(Germany) 2024	Round of 16	16th	4	0	3	1	2	4	10	7	1	2	19	10
(United Kingdom) (Republic of Ireland) 2028	To be determined								To be determined					
(Italy) (Turkey) 2032	To be determined								To be determined					
Total	1 Title	10/17	37	10	9	18	44	54	133	64	31	38	227	155

*Denotes draws including knockout matches decided via penalty shoot-out.
**Gold background colour indicates that the tournament was won.

=== List of matches ===
No.	Date	Round	Opponent	Result	Denmark scorer(s)	Attendance	Record
1	17 June 1964	Semi-finals	Soviet Union	0–3	—	38,556	0–0–1
2	20 June 1964	Third place match	Hungary	1–3 (a.e.t.)	Bertelsen 82'	3,869	0–0–2
3	12 June 1984	Group stage	France	0–1	—	47,570	0–0–3
4	16 June 1984	Group stage	Yugoslavia	5–0	Arnesen (2) 8', 69' (pen.), Berggreen 16', Elkjær 82', Lauridsen 84'	24,736	1–0–3
5	19 June 1984	Group stage	Belgium	3–2	Arnesen 41' (pen.), Brylle 60, Elkjær 84'	36,911	2–0–3
6	24 June 1984	Semi-finals	Spain	1–1 (a.e.t.) (4–5 p)	Lerby 6'	47,843	2–1–3
7	11 June 1988	Group stage	Spain (2)	2–3	Laudrup 24', Povlsen 62'	55,707	2–1–4
8	14 June 1988	Group stage	West Germany	0–2	—	64,812	2–1–5
9	17 June 1988	Group stage	Italy	0–2	—	53,951	2–1–6
10	11 June 1992	Group stage	England	0–0	—	26,385	2–2–6
11	14 June 1992	Group stage	Sweden	0–1	—	29,902	2–2–7
12	17 June 1992	Group stage	France (2)	2–1	Larsen 8', Elstrup 78'	25,673	3–2–7
13	22 June 1992	Semi-finals	Netherlands	2–2 (a.e.t.) (5–4 p)	Larsen (2) 5', 33'	37,450	3–3–7
14	26 June 1992	Final	Germany (2)	2–0	Jensen 18', Vilfort 78'	37,800	4–3–7
15	9 June 1996	Group stage	Portugal	1–1	B. Laudrup 22'	34,993	4–4–7
16	16 June 1996	Group stage	Croatia	0–3	—	33,671	4–4–8
17	19 June 1996	Group stage	Turkey	3–0	B. Laudrup (2) 50', 84', Nielsen 69'	28,671	5–4–8
18	11 June 2000	Group stage	France (3)	0–3	—	28,100	5–4–9
19	16 June 2000	Group stage	Netherlands (2)	0–3	—	51,117	5–4–10
20	21 June 2000	Group stage	Czech Republic	0–2	—	18,000	5–4–11
21	14 June 2004	Group stage	Italy (2)	0–0	—	29,595	5–5–11
22	18 June 2004	Group stage	Bulgaria	2–0	Tomasson 44', Grønkjær 90+2'	24,131	6–5–11
23	22 June 2004	Group stage	Sweden (2)	2–2	Tomasson (2) 28', 66'	26,115	6–6–11
24	27 June 2004	Quarter-finals	Czech Republic (2)	0–3	—	41,092	6–6–12
25	9 June 2012	Group stage	Netherlands (3)	1–0	Krohn-Dehli 24'	35,923	7–6–12
26	13 June 2012	Group stage	Portugal (2)	2–3	Bendtner (2) 41', 80'	31,840	7–6–13
27	17 June 2012	Group stage	Germany (3)	1–2	Krohn-Dehli 24'	32,990	7–6–14
28	12 June 2021	Group stage	Finland	0–1	—	13,790	7–6–15
29	17 June 2021	Group stage	Belgium (2)	1–2	Poulsen 2'	23,395	7–6–16
30	21 June 2021	Group stage	Russia	4–1	Damsgaard 38', Poulsen 59', Christensen 79', Mæhle 82'	23,644	8–6–16
31	26 June 2021	Round of 16	Wales	4–0	Dolberg (2) 27', 48', Mæhle 88', Braithwaite 90+4'	14,645	9–6–16
32	3 July 2021	Quarter-finals	Czech Republic (3)	2–1	Delaney 5', Dolberg 42'	16,306	10–6–16
33	7 July 2021	Semi-finals	England (2)	1–2 (a.e.t.)	Damsgaard 30'	64,950	10–6–17
34	16 June 2024	Group stage	Slovenia	1–1	Eriksen 17'	54,000	10–7–17
35	20 June 2024	Group stage	England (3)	1–1	Hjulmand 34'	46,177	10–8–17
36	25 June 2024	Group stage	Serbia	0–0	—	64,288	10–9–17
37	29 June 2024	Round of 16	Germany (4)	0–2	—	61,612	10–9–18

== 1964 European Nations' Cup ==
=== Final tournament ===
Semi-finals

17 June 1964
22:30

Denmark	0–3	Soviet Union
	Report	Voronin 19'; Ponedelnik 40'; Ivanov 87'

Camp Nou, Barcelona
Attendance: 38,556
Referee: Concetto Lo Bello (Italy)

Third place play-off

20 June 1964
20:30

Hungary	3–1 (a.e.t.)	Denmark
Bene 11'; Novák 107' (pen.), 110'	Report	Bertelsen 82'

Camp Nou, Barcelona
Attendance: 3,869
Referee: Daniel Mellet (Switzerland)

== Euro 1984 ==
=== Group stage ===
Pos	Team	Pld	W	D	L	GF	GA	GD	Pts	Qualification
1	France (H)	3	3	0	0	9	2	+7	6	Advance to knockout stage
2	Denmark	3	2	0	1	8	3	+5	4	Advance to knockout stage
3	Belgium	3	1	0	2	4	8	−4	2	
4	Yugoslavia	3	0	0	3	2	10	−8	0	

Source: UEFA
Rules for classification: Group stage tiebreakers
(H) Hosts
12 June 1984
20:30

France	1–0	Denmark
Platini 78'	Report

Parc des Princes, Paris
Attendance: 47,570
Referee: Volker Roth (West Germany)

16 June 1984
20:30

Denmark	5–0	Yugoslavia
Arnesen 8', 69' (pen.); Berggreen 16'; Elkjær 82'; Lauridsen 84'	Report

Stade de Gerland, Lyon
Attendance: 34,736
Referee: Augusto Lamo Castillo (Spain)

19 June 1984
20:30

Denmark	3–2	Belgium
Arnesen 41' (pen.); Brylle 60'; Elkjær 84'	Report	Ceulemans 26'; Vercauteren 39'

Stade de la Meinau, Strasbourg
Attendance: 36,911
Referee: Adolf Prokop (East Germany)

=== Knockout stage ===
Semi-finals

24 June 1984
20:00

Denmark	1–1 (a.e.t.)	Spain
Lerby 7'	Report	Maceda 67'
Penalties
Brylle (penalty scored); J. Olsen (penalty scored); Laudrup (penalty scored); Lerby (penalty scored); Elkjær (penalty missed)	4–5	(penalty scored) Santillana; (penalty scored) Señor; (penalty scored) Urquiaga; (penalty scored) Víctor; (penalty scored) Sarabia

Stade de Gerland, Lyon
Attendance: 47,843
Referee: George Courtney (England)

== Euro 1988 ==
=== Group stage ===
Pos	Team	Pld	W	D	L	GF	GA	GD	Pts	Qualification
1	West Germany (H)	3	2	1	0	5	1	+4	5	Advance to knockout stage
2	Italy	3	2	1	0	4	1	+3	5	Advance to knockout stage
3	Spain	3	1	0	2	3	5	−2	2	
4	Denmark	3	0	0	3	2	7	−5	0	

Source: UEFA
Rules for classification: Group stage tiebreakers
(H) Hosts
11 June 1988
15:30

Denmark	2–3	Spain
Laudrup 24'; Povlsen 82'	Report	Míchel 5'; Butragueño 53'; Gordillo 66'

Niedersachsenstadion, Hanover
Attendance: 55,707
Referee: Bep Thomas (Netherlands)

14 June 1988
17:15

West Germany	2–0	Denmark
Klinsmann 10'; Thon 85'	Report

Parkstadion, Gelsenkirchen
Attendance: 64,812
Referee: Bob Valentine (Scotland)

17 June 1988
20:15

Italy	2–0	Denmark
Altobelli 67'; De Agostini 87'	Report

Müngersdorfer Stadion, Cologne
Attendance: 53,951
Referee: Bruno Galler (Switzerland)

== Euro 1992 ==
=== Group stage ===
Pos	Team	Pld	W	D	L	GF	GA	GD	Pts	Qualification
1	Sweden (H)	3	2	1	0	4	2	+2	5	Advance to knockout stage
2	Denmark	3	1	1	1	2	2	0	3	Advance to knockout stage
3	France	3	0	2	1	2	3	−1	2	
4	England	3	0	2	1	1	2	−1	2	

Source: UEFA
Rules for classification: Group stage tiebreakers
(H) Hosts
11 June 1992
20:15

Denmark	0–0	England
	Report

Malmö Stadion, Malmö
Attendance: 26,385
Referee: John Blankenstein (Netherlands)

14 June 1992
20:15

Sweden	1–0	Denmark
Brolin 58'	Report

Råsunda Stadium, Solna
Attendance: 29,902
Referee: Aron Schmidhuber (Germany)

17 June 1992
20:15

France	1–2	Denmark
Papin 60'	Report	Larsen 8'; Elstrup 78'

Malmö Stadion, Malmö
Attendance: 25,763
Referee: Hubert Forstinger (Austria)

=== Knockout stage ===
Semi-finals

22 June 1992
20:15

Netherlands	2–2 (a.e.t.)	Denmark
Bergkamp 23'; Rijkaard 86'	Report	Larsen 5', 33'
Penalties
Koeman (penalty scored); Van Basten (penalty missed); Bergkamp (penalty scored); Rijkaard (penalty scored); Witschge (penalty scored)	4–5	(penalty scored) Larsen; (penalty scored) Povlsen; (penalty scored) Elstrup; (penalty scored) Vilfort; (penalty scored) Christofte

Ullevi, Gothenburg
Attendance: 37,450
Referee: Emilio Soriano Aladrén (Spain)

Final

26 June 1992
20:15

Denmark	2–0	Germany
Jensen 18'; Vilfort 78'	Report

Ullevi, Gothenburg
Attendance: 37,800
Referee: Bruno Galler (Switzerland)

== Euro 1996 ==
=== Group stage ===
Pos	Team	Pld	W	D	L	GF	GA	GD	Pts	Qualification
1	Portugal	3	2	1	0	5	1	+4	7	Advance to knockout stage
2	Croatia	3	2	0	1	4	3	+1	6	Advance to knockout stage
3	Denmark	3	1	1	1	4	4	0	4	
4	Turkey	3	0	0	3	0	5	−5	0	

Source: UEFA
Rules for classification: Group stage tiebreakers
9 June 1996
19:30

Denmark	1–1	Portugal
B. Laudrup 22'	Report	Sá Pinto 53'

Hillsborough, Sheffield
Attendance: 34,993
Referee: Mario van der Ende (Netherlands)

16 June 1996
18:00

Croatia	3–0	Denmark
Šuker 54' (pen.), 90'; Boban 81'	Report

Hillsborough, Sheffield
Attendance: 33,671
Referee: Marc Batta (France)

19 June 1996
16:30

Turkey	0–3	Denmark
	Report	B. Laudrup 50', 84'; A. Nielsen 69'

Hillsborough, Sheffield
Attendance: 28,951
Referee: Nikolai Levnikov (Russia)

== Euro 2000 ==
=== Group stage ===
Pos	Team	Pld	W	D	L	GF	GA	GD	Pts	Qualification
1	Netherlands (H)	3	3	0	0	7	2	+5	9	Advance to knockout stage
2	France	3	2	0	1	7	4	+3	6	Advance to knockout stage
3	Czech Republic	3	1	0	2	3	3	0	3	
4	Denmark	3	0	0	3	0	8	−8	0	

Source: UEFA
Rules for classification: Group stage tiebreakers
(H) Hosts
11 June 2000
18:00

France	3–0	Denmark
Blanc 16'; Henry 64'; Wiltord 90+2'	Report

Jan Breydel Stadium, Bruges
Attendance: 28,100
Referee: Günter Benkö (Austria)

16 June 2000
20:45

Denmark	0–3	Netherlands
	Report	Kluivert 57'; R. de Boer 66'; Zenden 77'

Feijenoord Stadion, Rotterdam
Attendance: 51,425
Referee: Urs Meier (Switzerland)

21 June 2000
20:45

Denmark	0–2	Czech Republic
	Report	Šmicer 64', 67'

Stade Maurice Dufrasne, Liège
Attendance: 20,000
Referee: Gamal Al-Ghandour (Egypt)

== Euro 2004 ==
=== Group stage ===
Pos	Team	Pld	W	D	L	GF	GA	GD	Pts	Qualification
1	Sweden	3	1	2	0	8	3	+5	5 (Note: Tied on head-to-head points (2) and goal difference (0). Head-to-head goals for: Sweden 3, Denmark 2, Italy 1.)	Advance to knockout stage
2	Denmark	3	1	2	0	4	2	+2	5	Advance to knockout stage
3	Italy	3	1	2	0	3	2	+1	5	
4	Bulgaria	3	0	0	3	1	9	−8	0	

Source: UEFA
Rules for classification: Group stage tiebreakers
Notes:
14 June 2004
17:00

Denmark	0–0	Italy
	Report

Estádio D. Afonso Henriques, Guimarães
Attendance: 29,595
Referee: Manuel Mejuto González (Spain)

18 June 2004
17:00

Bulgaria	0–2	Denmark
	Report	Tomasson 44'; Grønkjær 90+2'

Estádio Municipal de Braga, Braga
Attendance: 24,131
Referee: Lucílio Batista (Portugal)

22 June 2004
19:45

Denmark	2–2	Sweden
Tomasson 28', 66'	Report	Larsson 47' (pen.); Jonson 89'

Estádio do Bessa, Porto
Attendance: 26,115
Referee: Markus Merk (Germany)

=== Knockout stage ===
Quarter-finals

27 June 2004
19:45

Czech Republic	3–0	Denmark
Koller 49'; Baroš 63', 65'	Report

Estádio do Dragão, Porto
Attendance: 41,092
Referee: Valentin Ivanov (Russia)

== Euro 2012 ==
=== Group stage ===
Pos	Team	Pld	W	D	L	GF	GA	GD	Pts	Qualification
1	Germany	3	3	0	0	5	2	+3	9	Advance to knockout stage
2	Portugal	3	2	0	1	5	4	+1	6	Advance to knockout stage
3	Denmark	3	1	0	2	4	5	−1	3	
4	Netherlands	3	0	0	3	2	5	−3	0	

Source: UEFA
Rules for classification: Group stage tiebreakers
9 June 2012
19:00 EEST

Netherlands	0–1	Denmark
	Report	Krohn-Dehli 24'

Metalist Stadium, Kharkiv
Attendance: 35,923
Referee: Damir Skomina (Slovenia)

13 June 2012
19:00 EEST

Denmark	2–3	Portugal
Bendtner 41', 80'	Report	Pepe 24'; Postiga 36'; Varela 87'

Arena Lviv, Lviv
Attendance: 31,840
Referee: Craig Thomson (Scotland)

17 June 2012
21:45 EEST

Denmark	1–2	Germany
Krohn-Dehli 24'	Report	Podolski 19'; Bender 80'

Arena Lviv, Lviv
Attendance: 32,990
Referee: Carlos Velasco Carballo (Spain)

== Euro 2020 ==
=== Group stage ===
Pos	Team	Pld	W	D	L	GF	GA	GD	Pts	Qualification
1	Belgium	3	3	0	0	7	1	+6	9	Advance to knockout stage
2	Denmark (H)	3	1	0	2	5	4	+1	3 (Note: Tied on head-to-head points (3). Head-to-head goal difference: Denmark +2, Finland 0, Russia −2.)	Advance to knockout stage
3	Finland	3	1	0	2	1	3	−2	3	
4	Russia (H)	3	1	0	2	2	7	−5	3	

Source: UEFA
Rules for classification: Group stage tiebreakers
(H) Hosts
Notes:
12 June 2021
18:00

Denmark	0–1	Finland
	Report	Pohjanpalo 60'

Parken Stadium, Copenhagen
Attendance: 13,790
Referee: Anthony Taylor (England)

17 June 2021
18:00

Denmark	1–2	Belgium
Poulsen 2'	Report	T. Hazard 55'; De Bruyne 70'

Parken Stadium, Copenhagen
Attendance: 23,395
Referee: Björn Kuipers (Netherlands)

21 June 2021
21:00

Russia	1–4	Denmark
Dzyuba 70' (pen.)	Report	Damsgaard 38'; Poulsen 59'; Christensen 79'; Mæhle 82'

Parken Stadium, Copenhagen
Attendance: 23,644
Referee: Clément Turpin (France)

=== Knockout stage ===
Round of 16

26 June 2021
18:00

Wales	0–4	Denmark
	Report	Dolberg 27', 48'; Mæhle 88'; Braithwaite 90+4'

Johan Cruyff Arena, Amsterdam
Attendance: 14,645
Referee: Daniel Siebert (Germany)

Quarter-finals

3 July 2021
18:00 (20:00 UTC+4)

Czech Republic	1–2	Denmark
Schick 49'	Report	Delaney 5'; Dolberg 42'

Olympic Stadium, Baku
Attendance: 16,306
Referee: Björn Kuipers (Netherlands)

Semi-finals

7 July 2021
21:00 (20:00 UTC+1)

England	2–1 (a.e.t.)	Denmark
Kjær 39' (o.g.); Kane 104'	Report	Damsgaard 30'

Wembley Stadium, London
Attendance: 64,950
Referee: Danny Makkelie (Netherlands)

== Euro 2024 ==
=== Group stage ===
Pos	Team	Pld	W	D	L	GF	GA	GD	Pts	Qualification
1	England	3	1	2	0	2	1	+1	5	Advance to knockout stage
2	Denmark	3	0	3	0	2	2	0	3 (Note: Tied on head-to-head result (Slovenia 1–1 Denmark), overall goal difference and overall goals scored. Disciplinary points: Denmark −6, Slovenia −7.)	Advance to knockout stage
3	Slovenia	3	0	3	0	2	2	0	3	Advance to knockout stage
4	Serbia	3	0	2	1	1	2	−1	2	

Source: UEFA
Notes:
16 June 2024
18:00

Slovenia	1–1	Denmark
Janža 77'	Report	Eriksen 17'

MHPArena, Stuttgart
Attendance: 54,000
Referee: Sandro Schärer (Switzerland)

20 June 2024
18:00

Denmark	1–1	England
Hjulmand 34'	Report	Kane 18'

Waldstadion, Frankfurt
Attendance: 46,177
Referee: Artur Soares Dias (Portugal)

25 June 2024
21:00

Denmark	0–0	Serbia
	Report

Allianz Arena, Munich
Attendance: 64,288
Referee: François Letexier (France)

=== Knockout stage ===
Round of 16

29 June 2024
21:00

Germany	2–0	Denmark
Havertz 53' (pen.); Musiala 68'	Report

Westfalenstadion, Dortmund
Attendance: 61,612
Referee: Michael Oliver (England)

== Goalscorers ==
Player	Goals	1964	1984	1988	1992	1996	2000	2004	2012	2020	2024
Frank Arnesen	3		3								
Kasper Dolberg	3									3	
Henrik Larsen	3				3						
Brian Laudrup	3					3					
Jon Dahl Tomasson	3							3			
Nicklas Bendtner	2								2		
Mikkel Damsgaard	2									2	
Preben Elkjær	2		2								
Michael Krohn-Dehli	2								2		
Joakim Mæhle	2									2	
Yussuf Poulsen	2									2	
Klaus Berggreen	1		1								
Carl Bertelsen	1	1									
Martin Braithwaite	1									1	
Kenneth Brylle	1		1								
Andreas Christensen	1									1	
Thomas Delaney	1									1	
Lars Elstrup	1				1						
Christian Eriksen	1										1
Jesper Grønkjær	1							1			
Morten Hjulmand	1										1
John Jensen	1				1						
Michael Laudrup	1			1							
John Lauridsen	1		1								
Søren Lerby	1		1								
Allan Nielsen	1					1					
Flemming Povlsen	1			1							
Kim Vilfort	1				1						
Total	44	1	9	2	6	4	0	4	4	12	2

== See also ==
- Denmark at the FIFA World Cup
