= Denmark national football team results (2010–2019) =

This article provides details of international football games played by the Denmark national football team from 2010 to 2019.

== Results ==
Key
Win
Draw
Defeat

=== 2010 ===
3 March 2010 Friendly	Austria	2–1	Denmark	Vienna, Austria
20:30 CET	Schiemer 12'; Wallner 37'	Report	Bendtner 17'	Stadium: Ernst-Happel-Stadion; Attendance: 14,500; Referee: Pavel Královec (Czech Republic)

27 May 2010 Friendly	Denmark	2–0	Senegal	Aalborg, Denmark
20:15 CET	C. Poulsen 27'; Enevoldsen 90'	Report		Stadium: Aalborg Stadion; Attendance: 14,112; Referee: Bas Nijhuis (Netherlands)

1 June 2010 Friendly	Denmark	0–1	Australia	Roodepoort, South Africa
14:00 SAST		Report	Kennedy 71'	Stadium: Ruimsig Stadium; Attendance: 3,000; Referee: Daniel Bennett (South Africa)

5 June 2010 Friendly	South Africa	1–0	Denmark	Atteridgeville, South Africa
14:15 SAST	Mphela 76'	Report		Stadium: Atteridgeville Super Stadium; Attendance: 28,000; Referee: Matthew Dyer (South Africa)

14 June 2010 2010 World Cup Group E	Netherlands	2–0	Denmark	Johannesburg, South Africa
13:30 SAST	Agger 46' (o.g.); Kuyt 85'	Report		Stadium: Soccer City; Attendance: 83,465; Referee: Stéphane Lannoy (France)

19 June 2010 2010 World Cup Group E	Cameroon	1–2	Denmark	Pretoria, South Africa
20:30 SAST	Eto'o 10'	Report	Bendtner 33'; Rommedahl 61'	Stadium: Loftus Versfeld Stadium; Attendance: 38,074; Referee: Jorge Larrionda (Uruguay)

24 June 2010 2010 World Cup Group E	Denmark	1–3	Japan	Rustenburg, South Africa
20:30 SAST	Tomasson 81'	Report	Honda 17'; Endō 30'; Okazaki 87'	Stadium: Royal Bafokeng Stadium; Attendance: 27,967; Referee: Jerome Damon (South Africa)

11 August 2010 Friendly	Denmark	2–2	Germany	Copenhagen, Denmark
20:30 CET	Rommedahl 74'; Junker 87'	Report	Gómez 19'; Helmes 73'	Stadium: Parken Stadium; Attendance: 19,071; Referee: Alan Kelly (Ireland)

7 September 2010 Euro 2012 qualifying	Denmark	1–0	Iceland	Copenhagen, Denmark
20:15 CET	Kahlenberg 90+1'	Report		Stadium: Parken Stadium; Attendance: 18,908; Referee: Dougie McDonald (Scotland)

8 October 2010 Euro 2012 qualifying	Portugal	3–1	Denmark	Porto, Portugal
20:45 CET	Nani 29', 31'; Ronaldo 85'	Report	Carvalho 80' (o.g.)	Stadium: Estádio do Dragão; Attendance: 27,117; Referee: Eric Braamhaar (Netherlands)

12 October 2010 Euro 2012 qualifying	Denmark	2–0	Cyprus	Copenhagen, Denmark
20:15 CET	Rasmussen 47'; Lorentzen 81'	Report		Stadium: Parken Stadium; Attendance: 15,544; Referee: César Muñiz Fernández (Spain)

17 November 2010 Friendly	Denmark	0–0	Czech Republic	Aarhus, Denmark
20:15 CET		Report		Stadium: Aarhus Stadium; Attendance: 9,184; Referee: Howard Webb (England)

=== 2011 ===
9 February 2011 Friendly	Denmark	1–2	England	Copenhagen, Denmark
20:15 CET	Agger 8'	Report	Bent 10'; Cole 68'	Stadium: Parken Stadium; Attendance: 25,235; Referee: Jonas Eriksson (Sweden)

26 March 2011 Euro 2012 qualifying	Norway	1–1	Denmark	Oslo, Norway
20:00 CET	Huseklepp 81'	Report	Rommedahl 27'	Stadium: Ullevaal Stadion; Attendance: 24,828; Referee: Gianluca Rocchi (Italy)

29 March 2011 Friendly	Slovakia	1–2	Denmark	Trnava, Slovakia
20:15 CET	Holosko 32'	Report	Saláta 3' (o.g.); Krohn-Dehli 72'	Stadium: Štadión Antona Malatinského; Attendance: 3,000; Referee: David Fernández Borbalán (Spain)

4 June 2011 Euro 2012 qualifying	Iceland	0–2	Denmark	Reykjavík, Iceland
18:45 GMT		Report	Schøne 60'; Eriksen 75'	Stadium: Laugardalsvöllur; Attendance: 7,629; Referee: Fırat Aydınus (Turkey)

10 August 2011 Friendly	Scotland	2–1	Denmark	Glasgow, Scotland
19:45 BST	Kvist 22' (o.g.); Snodgrass 44'	Report	Eriksen 31'	Stadium: Hampden Park; Attendance: 17,582; Referee: Marco Borg (Malta)

6 September 2011 Euro 2012 qualifying	Denmark	2–0	Norway	Copenhagen, Denmark
20:15 CET	Bendtner 24', 44'	Report		Stadium: Parken Stadium; Attendance: 37,167; Referee: Stéphane Lannoy (France)

7 October 2011 Euro 2012 qualifying	Cyprus	1–4	Denmark	Nicosia, Cyprus
21:30 EEST	Avraam 45+1'	Report	Jacobsen 7'; Rommedahl 11', 22'; Krohn-Dehli 20'	Stadium: GSP Stadium; Attendance: 2,408; Referee: Marijo Strahonja (Croatia)

11 October 2011 Euro 2012 qualifying	Denmark	2–1	Portugal	Copenhagen, Denmark
20:15 CET	Krohn-Dehli 13'; Bendtner 63'	Report	Ronaldo 90+2'	Stadium: Parken Stadium; Attendance: 37,012; Referee: Nicola Rizzoli (Italy)

11 November 2011 Friendly	Denmark	2–0	Sweden	Copenhagen, Denmark
19:00 CET	Bendtner 35'; Krohn-Dehli 80'	Report		Stadium: Parken Stadium; Attendance: 18,057; Referee: Svein Oddvar Moen (Norway)

15 November 2011 Friendly	Denmark	2–1	Finland	Esbjerg, Denmark
20:15 CET	Agger 57'; Bendtner 59'	Report	Eremenko 18'	Stadium: Blue Water Arena; Attendance: 14,137; Referee: Kristinn Jakobsson (Iceland)

=== 2012 ===
29 February 2012 Friendly	Denmark	0–2	Russia	Copenhagen, Denmark
19:45 CET		Report	Shirokov 4'; Arshavin 45'	Stadium: Parken Stadium; Attendance: 13,593; Referee: István Vad (Hungary)

26 May 2012 Friendly	Denmark	1–3	Brazil	Hamburg, Germany
15:30 CET	Bendtner 71'	Report	Hulk 8', 40'; Zimling 44' (o.g.)	Stadium: Volksparkstadion; Attendance: 51,000; Referee: Felix Brych (Germany)

2 June 2012 Friendly	Denmark	2–0	Australia	Copenhagen, Denmark
17:00 GMT	Agger 32' (pen.); Bjelland 68'	Report		Stadium: Parken Stadium; Attendance: 15,388; Referee: Antonio Damato (Italy)

9 June 2012 Euro 2012 Group B	Netherlands	0–1	Denmark	Kharkiv, Ukraine
18:00 GMT		Report	Krohn-Dehli 24'	Stadium: Metalist Stadium; Attendance: 35,923; Referee: Damir Skomina (Slovenia)

17 June 2012 Euro 2012 Group B	Denmark	1–2	Germany	Lviv, Ukraine
20:45 GMT	Krohn-Dehli 24'	Report	Podolski 19'; Bender 80'	Stadium: Arena Lviv; Attendance: 32,990; Referee: Carlos Velasco Carballo (Spain)

13 June 2012 Euro 2012 Group B	Denmark	2–3	Portugal	Lviv, Ukraine
18:00 GMT	Bendtner 41', 80'	Report	Pepe 24'; Postiga 36'; Varela 87'	Stadium: Arena Lviv; Attendance: 31,840; Referee: Craig Thomson (Scotland)

15 August 2012 Friendly	Denmark	1–3	Slovakia	Odense, Denmark
19:15 GMT	Mikkelsen 22'	Report	Jakubko 64'; Hamšík 72'; Guldan 83'	Stadium: Odense Stadium; Attendance: 9,209; Referee: Daniel Stålhammar (Sweden)

8 September 2012 2014 World Cup qualification	Denmark	0–0	Czech Republic	Copenhagen, Denmark
19:15 GMT		Report		Stadium: Parken Stadium; Attendance: 24,004; Referee: Wolfgang Stark (Germany)

12 October 2012 2014 World Cup qualification	Bulgaria	1–1	Denmark	Sofia, Bulgaria
18:00 GMT	Rangelov 7'	Report	Bendtner 40'	Stadium: Vasil Levski National Stadium; Attendance: 20,780; Referee: Tony Chapron (France)

16 October 2012 2014 World Cup qualification	Italy	3–1	Denmark	Milan, Italy
18:45 GMT	Montolivo 34'; De Rossi 37'; Balotelli 54'	Report	Kvist 45+1'	Stadium: San Siro; Attendance: 37,027; Referee: Damir Skomina (Slovenia)

14 November 2012 Friendly	Turkey	1–1	Denmark	Istanbul, Turkey
18:00 GMT	Erdinç 69'	Report	Bendtner 65' (pen.)	Stadium: Türk Telekom Arena; Attendance: 30,000; Referee: Felix Brych (Germany)

=== 2013 ===
6 February 2013 Friendly	Macedonia	3–0	Denmark	Skopje, Macedonia
19:30 GMT	Pandev 9'; Ibraimi 17'; Noveski 24'	Report		Stadium: Philip II Arena; Attendance: 5,000; Referee: Nikola Dabanović (Montenegro)

22 March 2013 2014 World Cup qualification	Czech Republic	0–3	Denmark	Olomouc, Czech Republic
19:30 GMT		Report	Cornelius 57'; Kjær 67'; Zimling 83'	Stadium: Andrův Stadion; Attendance: 12,288; Referee: Jorge Sousa (Portugal)

26 March 2013 2014 World Cup qualification	Denmark	1–1	Bulgaria	Copenhagen, Denmark
19:15 GMT	Agger 63' (pen.)	Report	Manolev 51'	Stadium: Parken Stadium; Attendance: 22,182; Referee: Fırat Aydınus (Turkey)

5 June 2013 Friendly	Denmark	2–1	Georgia	Aalborg, Denmark
19:15 GMT	Pedersen 77'; Eriksen 89'	Report	Dzaria 52'	Stadium: Nordjyske Arena; Attendance: 6,567; Referee: Felix Brych (Germany)

11 June 2013 2014 World Cup qualification	Denmark	0–4	Armenia	Copenhagen, Denmark
19:15 GMT			Movsisyan 1', 59'; Ozbiliz 19'; Mkhitaryan 82'	Stadium: Parken Stadium; Attendance: 14,284; Referee: Alexey Nikolaev (Russia)

14 August 2013 Friendly	Poland	3–2	Denmark	Gdańsk, Poland
19:45 GMT	Klich 5'; Sobota 59'; Zieliński 60'	Report	Eriksen 18'; Braithwaite 45+1'	Stadium: PGE Arena Gdańsk; Attendance: 34,952; Referee: Yudai Yamamoto (Japan)

6 September 2013 2014 World Cup qualification	Malta	1–2	Denmark	Ta' Qali, Malta
19:00 GMT	Failla 38'	Report	Andreasen 2'; Camilleri 69' (o.g.)	Stadium: Ta' Qali National Stadium; Attendance: 10,000; Referee: Anastasios Sidiropoulos (Greece)

10 September 2013 2014 World Cup qualification	Armenia	0–1	Denmark	Yerevan, Armenia
17:00 GMT		Report	Agger 73' (pen.)	Stadium: Hrazdan Stadium; Attendance: 25,000; Referee: Bas Nijhuis (Netherlands)

11 October 2013 2014 World Cup qualification	Denmark	2–2	Italy	Copenhagen, Denmark
19:15 GMT	Bendtner 45+1', 79'	Report	Osvaldo 28'; Aquilani 90+1'	Stadium: Parken Stadium; Attendance: 35,000; Referee: Stéphane Lannoy (France)

15 October 2013 2014 World Cup qualification	Denmark	6–0	Malta	Copenhagen, Denmark
19:15 GMT	Rasmussen 8', 74'; Agger 11' (pen.), 39' (pen.); Bjelland 28'; Bille Nielsen 84'	Report		Stadium: Parken Stadium; Attendance: 11,479; Referee: Aleksandar Stavrev (Macedonia)

15 November 2013 Friendly	Denmark	2–1	Norway	Herning, Denmark
18:00 GMT	Kvist 14'; Boilesen 90'	Report	Pedersen 78'	Stadium: MCH Arena; Attendance: 6,084; Referee: Robert Schörgenhofer (Austria)

=== 2014 ===
5 March 2014 Friendly	England	1–0	Denmark	London, England
20:00 GMT	Sturridge 82'	Report		Stadium: Wembley Stadium; Attendance: 68,573; Referee: Kevin Blom (Netherlands)

22 May 2014 Friendly	Hungary	2–2	Denmark	Debrecen, Hungary
20:15 UTC+2	Dzsudzsák 25'; Varga 69'	Report	Eriksen 56'; Schöne 73'	Stadium: Nagyerdei Stadion; Attendance: 20,000; Referee: Szymon Marciniak (Poland)

28 May 2014 Friendly	Denmark	1–0	Sweden	Copenhagen, Denmark
20:15 UTC+2	Agger 90+2' (pen.)	Report		Stadium: Parken Stadium; Attendance: 27,872; Referee: Svein Oddvar Moen (Norway)

4 September 2014 Friendly	Denmark	1–2	Turkey	Odense, Denmark
20:15 UTC+2	Agger 35' (pen.)	Report	Şahan 54'; Tufan 90+2'	Stadium: TRE-FOR Park; Attendance: 13,169; Referee: Milorad Mažić (Serbia)

7 September 2014 Euro 2016 qualifying	Denmark	2–1	Armenia	Copenhagen, Denmark
18:00 UTC+2	Højbjerg 65'; Kahlenberg 80'	Report	Mkhitaryan 50'	Stadium: Telia Parken; Attendance: 20,147; Referee: Alexandru Tudor (Romania)

11 October 2014 Euro 2016 qualifying	Albania	1–1	Denmark	Elbasan, Albania
20:45 UTC+2	Lenjani 38'	Report	Vibe 81'	Stadium: Ruzhdi Bizhuta Stadium; Attendance: 12,800; Referee: Viktor Kassai (Hungary)

14 October 2014 Euro 2016 qualifying	Denmark	0–1	Portugal	Copenhagen, Denmark
20:45 UTC+2		Report	Ronaldo 90+5'	Stadium: Telia Parken; Attendance: 36,562; Referee: Felix Brych (Germany)

14 November 2014 Euro 2016 qualifying	Serbia	1–3	Denmark	Belgrade, Serbia
20:45 UTC+2	Tošić 4'	Report	Bendtner 60', 84'; Kjær 62'	Stadium: Partizan Stadium; Attendance: 0 (Note: Played behind closed doors due to a sanction imposed on Serbia after the abandoned match against Albania.); Referee: Cüneyt Çakır (Turkey)

18 November 2014 Friendly	Romania	2–0	Denmark	Bucharest, Romania
20:30 UTC+2	Keserü 53', 58'	Report		Stadium: Arena Nationala; Attendance: 5,000; Referee: Slavko Vinčić (Slovenia)

=== 2015 ===
25 March 2015 Friendly	Denmark	3–2	United States	Aarhus, Denmark
20:15 UTC+2	Bendtner 33', 83', 90+1'	Report	Altidore 19'; Jóhannsson 66'	Stadium: Atletion; Attendance: 10,505; Referee: Mattias Gestranius (Finland)

29 March 2015 Centralised Friendly	France	2–0	Denmark	Saint-Étienne, France
20:45 UTC+2	Lacazette 14'; Giroud 38'	Raport		Stadium: Stade Geoffroy-Guichard; Attendance: 35,000; Referee: Ivan Kružliak (Slovakia)

8 June 2015 Friendly	Denmark	2–1	Montenegro	Viborg, Denmark
20:00 UTC+2	Eriksen 71'; Fischer 86' (pen.)	Report	Jovetić 17'	Stadium: Energi Viborg Arena; Attendance: 9,180; Referee: Ken Henry Johnsen (Norway)

13 June 2015 Euro 2016 qualifying	Denmark	2–0	Serbia	Copenhagen, Denmark
20:45 UTC+2	Y. Poulsen 13'; J. Poulsen 87'	Report		Stadium: Telia Parken; Attendance: 30,887; Referee: Björn Kuipers (Netherlands)

4 September 2015 Euro 2016 qualifying	Denmark	0–0	Albania	Copenhagen, Denmark
20:45 UTC+2		Report		Stadium: Telia Parken; Attendance: 35,648; Referee: Willie Collum (Scotland)

7 September 2015 Euro 2016 qualifying	Armenia	0–0	Denmark	Yerevan, Armenia
18:00 UTC+2		Report		Stadium: Hrazdan Stadium; Attendance: 7,500; Referee: Svein Oddvar Moen (Norway)

8 October 2015 Euro 2016 qualifying	Portugal	1–0	Denmark	Braga, Portugal
20:45 UTC+2	Moutinho 66'	Report		Stadium: Estádio Municipal de Braga; Attendance: 29,860; Referee: Mark Clattenburg (England)

11 October 2015 Centralised Friendly	Denmark	1–2	France	Copenhagen, Denmark
20:45 UTC+2	Sviatchenko 90+1'	Report	Giroud 4', 6'	Stadium: Parken Stadium; Attendance: 18,145; Referee: Jonas Eriksson (Sweden)

14 November 2015 Euro 2016 qualifying play-offs	Sweden	2–1	Denmark	Solna, Sweden
20:45 UTC+1	Forsberg 45'; Ibrahimović 50' (pen.)	Report	N. Jørgensen 80'	Stadium: Friends Arena; Attendance: 49,053; Referee: Nicola Rizzoli (Italy)

17 November 2015 Euro 2016 qualifying play-offs	Denmark	2–2 (3–4 agg.)	Sweden	Copenhagen, Denmark
20:45 UTC+1	Y. Poulsen 82'; Vestergaard 90+1'	Report	Ibrahimović 19', 76'	Stadium: Parken Stadium; Attendance: 36,051; Referee: Martin Atkinson (England)

=== 2016 ===
24 March 2016 Friendly	Denmark	2–1	Iceland	Herning, Denmark
20:00 UTC+1	N. Jørgensen 50', 54'	Report	Traustason 90'	Stadium: MCH Arena; Attendance: 9,194; Referee: Tore Hansen (Norway)

29 March 2016 Friendly	Scotland	1–0	Denmark	Glasgow, Scotland
20:45 UTC+1	Ritchie 8'	Report		Stadium: Hampden Park; Attendance: 18,385; Referee: Svein Oddvar Moen (Norway)

3 June 2016 2016 Kirin Cup SF	Bosnia and Herzegovina	2–2 (a.e.t.) (4–3 p)	Denmark	Aichi, Japan
16:00 UTC+9	Đurić 52', 83'	Report	Kjær 22'; Fischer 41'	Stadium: Toyota Stadium; Attendance: 14,001; Referee: Ben Williams (Australia)
	Penalties
	Vrančić (penalty missed); Krunić (penalty scored); Hodžić (penalty scored); Stevanović (penalty scored); Medunjanin (penalty scored)		(penalty scored) Rasmussen; (penalty missed) Vestergaard; (penalty missed) Christensen; (penalty scored) Schöne; (penalty scored) Eriksen

7 June 2016 2016 Kirin Cup 3rd place	Bulgaria	0–4	Denmark	Osaka, Japan
16:00 UTC+9			Rasmussen 39'; Eriksen 72', 74', 82'	Stadium: Suita City Football Stadium; Attendance: 14,223; Referee: Ryuji Sato (Japan)

31 August 2016 Friendly	Denmark	5–0	Liechtenstein	Horsens, Denmark
	N. Jørgensen 30', 33'; Cornelius 49'; Fischer 62'; Stryger Larsen 84'	Report		Stadium: CASA Arena; Attendance: 8,004; Referee: Thoroddur Hjaltalin (Iceland)

4 September 2016 2018 World Cup qualification	Denmark	1–0	Armenia	Copenhagen, Denmark
18:00 UTC+2	Eriksen 17'	Report		Stadium: Parken Stadium; Attendance: 21,700; Referee: Harald Lechner (Austria)

8 October 2016 2018 World Cup qualification	Poland	3–2	Denmark	Warsaw, Poland
20:45 UTC+2	Lewandowski 20', 36', 48'	Report	Glik 49' (o.g.); Y. Poulsen 68'	Stadium: National Stadium; Attendance: 56,811; Referee: Gianluca Rocchi (Italy)

11 October 2016 2018 World Cup qualification	Denmark	0–1	Montenegro	Copenhagen, Denmark
20:45 UTC+2		Report	Bećiraj 32'	Stadium: Parken Stadium; Attendance: 20,582; Referee: Alberto Undiano Mallenco (Spain)

11 November 2016 2018 World Cup qualification	Denmark	4–1	Kazakhstan	Copenhagen, Denmark
20:45 UTC+1	Cornelius 15'; Eriksen 36' (pen.), 90+2'; Ankersen 78'	Report	Suyumbayev 17'	Stadium: Parken Stadium; Attendance: 18,901; Referee: Alon Yefet (Israel)

15 November 2016 Friendly	Czech Republic	1–1	Denmark	Mladá Boleslav, Czech Republic
20:30 UTC+1	Barák 8'	Report	N. Jørgensen 39'	Stadium: Městský stadion (Mladá Boleslav); Attendance: 1,765; Referee: Manuel Schüttengruber (Austria)

=== 2017 ===
26 March 2017 2018 World Cup qualification	Romania	0–0	Denmark	Cluj-Napoca, Romania
21:45 EEST (UTC+03:00)		Report		Stadium: Cluj Arena; Attendance: 26,895; Referee: Martin Atkinson (England)

6 June 2017 Friendly	Denmark	1–1	Germany	Brøndby, Denmark
20:45 CEST (UTC+02:00)	Eriksen 18'	Report	Kimmich 88'	Stadium: Brøndby Stadium; Attendance: 15,488; Referee: Michael Oliver (England)

10 June 2017 2018 World Cup qualification	Kazakhstan	1–3	Denmark	Almaty, Kazakhstan
22:00 ALMT (UTC+06:00)	Kuat 76'	Report	N. Jørgensen 27'; Eriksen 51' (pen.); Dolberg 81'	Stadium: Almaty Central Stadium; Attendance: 19,165; Referee: Vladislav Bezborodov (Russia)

1 September 2017 2018 World Cup qualification	Denmark	4–0	Poland	Copenhagen, Denmark
20:45 CEST (UTC+02:00)	Delaney 15'; Cornelius 42'; N. Jørgensen 59'; Eriksen 80'	Report		Stadium: Parken Stadium; Attendance: 34,505; Referee: Milorad Mažić (Serbia)

4 September 2017 2018 World Cup qualification	Armenia	1–4	Denmark	Yerevan, Armenia
20:00 AMT (UTC+04:00)	Koryan 6'	Report	Delaney 17', 82', 90+3'; Eriksen 29'	Stadium: Hrazdan Stadium; Attendance: 6,800; Referee: Bobby Madden (Scotland)

5 October 2017 2018 World Cup qualification	Montenegro	0–1	Denmark	Podgorica, Montenegro
20:45 CEST (UTC+02:00)		Report	Eriksen 16'	Stadium: City Stadium; Attendance: 10,779; Referee: Björn Kuipers (Netherlands)

8 October 2017 2018 World Cup qualification	Denmark	1–1	Romania	Copenhagen, Denmark
18:00 CEST (UTC+02:00)	Eriksen 60' (pen.)	Report	Deac 88'	Stadium: Telia Parken; Attendance: 36,084; Referee: Deniz Aytekin (Germany)

11 November 2017 2018 World Cup qualification R2	Denmark	0–0	Republic of Ireland	Copenhagen, Denmark
20:45 CET (UTC+01:00)		Report		Stadium: Telia Parken; Attendance: 36,189; Referee: Milorad Mažić (Serbia)

14 November 2017 2018 World Cup qualification R2	Republic of Ireland	1–5 (1–5 agg.)	Denmark	Dublin, Ireland
19:45 GMT (UTC±00:00)	Duffy 6'	Report	Christensen 29'; Eriksen 32', 63', 74'; Bendtner 90' (pen.)	Stadium: Aviva Stadium; Attendance: 51,500; Referee: Szymon Marciniak (Poland)

=== 2018 ===
15 January 2018 Friendly	Jordan	3–2	Denmark	Abu Dhabi, United Arab Emirates
20:00 (UTC+2)	Al-Maharmeh 25'; Al-Dardour 57'; Al-Mardi 83'	Report	Gammelby 48'; Duelund 87'	Stadium: Zayed Sports City Stadium; Attendance: 272; Referee: Adel Al Naqbi (United Arab Emirates)

22 March 2018 Friendly	Denmark	1–0	Panama	Brøndby, Denmark
20:00 (UTC+2)	Sisto 69'	Report		Stadium: Brøndby Stadium; Attendance: 11,160; Referee: Neil Doyle (Ireland)

27 March 2018 Friendly	Denmark	0–0	Chile	Aalborg, Denmark
20:00 UTC+2		Report		Stadium: Aalborg Stadium; Attendance: 11,527; Referee: John Beaton (Scotland)

2 June 2018 Friendly	Sweden	0–0	Denmark	Stockholm, Sweden
19:45 UTC+2		Report		Stadium: Friends Arena; Attendance: 41,558; Referee: Tobias Stieler (Germany)

9 June 2018 Friendly	Denmark	2–0	Mexico	Brøndby, Denmark
20:00 UTC+2	Y. Poulsen 71'; Eriksen 74'	Report		Stadium: Brøndby Stadium; Attendance: 16,376; Referee: Kai Erik Steen (Norway)

16 June 2018 2018 World Cup Group C	Peru	0–1	Denmark	Saransk, Russia
19:00 UTC+3		Report	Y. Poulsen 59'	Stadium: Mordovia Arena; Attendance: 40,502; Referee: Bakary Gassama (Gambia)

21 June 2018 2018 World Cup Group C	Denmark	1–1	Australia	Samara, Russia
16:00 UTC+4	Eriksen 7'	Report	Jedinak 38' (pen.)	Stadium: Cosmos Arena; Attendance: 40,727; Referee: Antonio Mateu Lahoz (Spain)

26 June 2018 2018 World Cup Group C	Denmark	0–0	France	Moscow, Russia
17:00 UTC+3		Report		Stadium: Luzhniki Stadium; Attendance: 78,011; Referee: Sandro Ricci (Brazil)

1 July 2018 2018 World Cup R16	Croatia	1–1 (a.e.t.) (3–2 p)	Denmark	Nizhny Novgorod, Russia
21:00 MSK (UTC+3)	Mandžukić 4'	Report	M. Jørgensen 1'	Stadium: Nizhny Novgorod Stadium; Attendance: 40,851; Referee: Néstor Pitana (Argentina)
	Penalties
	Badelj (penalty missed); Kramarić (penalty scored); Modrić (penalty scored); Pivarić (penalty missed); Rakitić (penalty scored)		(penalty missed) Eriksen; (penalty scored) Kjær; (penalty scored) Krohn-Dehli; (penalty missed) Schöne; (penalty missed) N. Jørgensen

5 September 2018 Friendly	Slovakia	3–0	Denmark	Trnava, Slovakia
20:45 UTC+2	Nemec 11'; Rusnák 37'; Fogt 79' (o.g.)	Report		Stadium: Štadión Antona Malatinského; Attendance: 6,432; Referee: Julian Weinberger (Austria)

9 September 2018 2018–19 Nations League	Denmark	2–0	Wales	Aarhus, Denmark
18:00 UTC+2	Eriksen 32', 63' (pen.)	Report		Stadium: Ceres Park; Attendance: 17,506; Referee: Deniz Aytekin (Germany)

13 October 2018 2018–19 Nations League	Republic of Ireland	0–0	Denmark	Dublin, Ireland
19:45 UTC+1		Report		Stadium: Aviva Stadium; Attendance: 41,220; Referee: Xavier Estrada Fernández (Spain)

16 October 2018 Friendly	Denmark	2–0	Austria	Herning, Denmark
20:45 UTC+2	Lerager 29'; Braithwaite 90+3'	Report		Stadium: MCH Arena; Attendance: 7,386; Referee: Ola Hobber Nilsen (Norway)

16 November 2018 2018–19 Nations League	Wales	1–2	Denmark	Cardiff, Wales
19:45 UTC±0	Bale 89'	Report	N. Jørgensen 42'; Braithwaite 88'	Stadium: Cardiff City Stadium; Attendance: 32,354; Referee: Ivan Kružliak (Slovakia)

19 November 2018 2018–19 Nations League	Denmark	0–0	Republic of Ireland	Aarhus, Denmark
20:45 UTC+1		Report		Stadium: Ceres Park; Attendance: 11,130; Referee: Aliyar Aghayev (Azerbaijan)

=== 2019 ===
21 March 2019 Friendly	Kosovo	2–2	Denmark	Pristina, Kosovo
19:00 UTC+1	Rrahmani 42'; Celina 66'	Report	Eriksen 63'; Højbjerg 90+1'	Stadium: Fadil Vokrri Stadium; Attendance: 13,000; Referee: Ali Palabıyık (Turkey)

26 March 2019 Euro 2020 qualifying	Switzerland	3–3	Denmark	Basel, Switzerland
20:45 UTC+1	Freuler 19'; Xhaka 66'; Embolo 76'	Report	M. Jørgensen 84'; Gytkjær 88'; Dalsgaard 90+3'	Stadium: St. Jakob-Park; Attendance: 18,352; Referee: Damir Skomina (Slovenia)

7 June 2019 Euro 2020 qualifying	Denmark	1–1	Republic of Ireland	Copenhagen, Denmark
20:45 UTC+2	Højbjerg 76'	Report	Duffy 85'	Stadium: Parken Stadium; Attendance: 34,610; Referee: Cüneyt Çakır (Turkey)

10 June 2019 Euro 2020 qualifying	Denmark	5–1	Georgia	Copenhagen, Denmark
20:45 UTC+2	Dolberg 14', 63'; Eriksen 30' (pen.); Y. Poulsen 73'; Braithwaite 90+3'	Report	Lobzhanidze 25'	Stadium: Parken Stadium; Attendance: 15,387; Referee: Robert Schörgenhofer (Austria)

5 September 2019 Euro 2020 qualifying	Gibraltar	0–6	Denmark	Gibraltar
20:45 UTC+2		Report	Skov 6'; Eriksen 34' (pen.), 50' (pen.); Delaney 69'; Gytkjær 73', 78'	Stadium: Victoria Stadium; Attendance: 2,076; Referee: Jonathan Lardot (Belgium)

8 September 2019 Euro 2020 qualifying	Georgia	0–0	Denmark	Tbilisi, Georgia
20:00 UTC+4		Report		Stadium: Boris Paichadze Dinamo Arena; Attendance: 21,456; Referee: François Letexier (France)

12 October 2019 Euro 2020 qualifying	Denmark	1–0	Switzerland	Copenhagen, Denmark
18:00 UTC+2	Y. Poulsen 84'	Report		Stadium: Parken Stadium; Attendance: 35,964; Referee: Aleksei Kulbakov (Belarus)

15 October 2019 Friendly	Denmark	4–0	Luxembourg	Aalborg, Denmark
20:00 UTC+2	Braithwaite 13'; Dolberg 21', 59'; Gytkjær 67'	Report		Stadium: Aalborg Stadium; Attendance: 9,043; Referee: Bojan Pandžić (Sweden)

15 November 2019 Euro 2020 qualifying	Denmark	6–0	Gibraltar	Copenhagen, Denmark
20:45 UTC+1	Skov 12', 64'; Gytkjær 47'; Braithwaite 51'; Eriksen 85', 90+4'	Report		Stadium: Parken Stadium; Attendance: 24,033; Referee: István Vad (Hungary)

18 November 2019 Euro 2020 qualifying	Republic of Ireland	1–1	Denmark	Dublin, Ireland
19:45 UTC±0	Doherty 85'	Report	Braithwaite 73'	Stadium: Aviva Stadium; Attendance: 50,000; Referee: Felix Brych (Germany)

== Sources ==
- (in Danish) Landsholdsdatabasen at DBU.dk
- (in Danish) haslund.info
