= UEFA Euro 2012 Group B =

Football tournament group stage

Group B of UEFA Euro 2012 began on 9 June 2012 and ended on 17 June 2012. The pool was made up of the Netherlands, Denmark, Germany and Portugal. Germany and Portugal progressed to the quarter-finals, while Denmark and the Netherlands were eliminated from the tournament.

Group B was dubbed by many the "group of death" of Euro 2012. All four teams were in the top 10 of the FIFA World Rankings at the start of the tournament.

In the first round, Denmark upset Netherlands 1–0 with a 24th-minute goal from Michael Krohn-Dehli. In the next match, Germany defeated Portugal 1–0 with a 72nd-minute goal from Mario Gómez, leaving Germany and Denmark tied at three points at the top of the group with Portugal and the Netherlands at the bottom of the group with no points.

In the second round, when Portugal played Denmark, Portugal went ahead 2–0 with a 24th-minute goal from Pepe and a 36th-minute goal from Hélder Postiga, but with two goals from Nicklas Bendtner (41st and 80th minute), Denmark equalized. However, Portugal's Silvestre Varela scored in the 87th minute to give Portugal the win. In the next match, Netherlands and Germany continued their longstanding rivalry. Striker Mario Gómez scored twice in the first half (24th and 38th minute) to put the Germans ahead 2–0, and despite a 73rd-minute goal from Robin van Persie, Germany won 2–1.

Leading into the third round, all four teams were still able to qualify and no team was already qualified, despite the fact that Germany had 6 points and Netherlands had 0 points. Ultimately, Germany defeated Denmark 2–1 after Lukas Podolski and Lars Bender scored for Germany in the 19th and 80th minutes, respectively, despite an equalizer from Michael Krohn-Dehli in the 24th minute. In the other match (played simultaneously in order to prevent the teams from gaining a strategic advantage by knowing the result of the other match on the same day) between Portugal and Netherlands, Rafael van der Vaart scored to give the Netherlands a lead for the first time in the entire tournament, but after much criticism in the media for his failure to score in the first two matches, Cristiano Ronaldo scored twice to secure a 2–1 victory for Portugal. With these results, Germany and Portugal qualified, in first and second place, respectively, and Denmark and Netherlands were eliminated.

== Teams ==
Draw position	Team	Pot	Method of qualification	Date of qualification	Finals appearance	Last appearance	Previous best performance	UEFA Rankings November 2011 (Note: The UEFA rankings of November 2011 were used for seeding for the final draw.)	FIFA Rankings June 2012
B1	Netherlands	1	Group E winner	6 September 2011	9th	2008	Winners (1988)	2	4
B2	Denmark	4	Group H winner	11 October 2011	8th	2004	Winners (1992)	11	9
B3	Germany (Note: From 1972 to 1988, Germany competed as West Germany.)	2	Group A winner	2 September 2011	11th	2008	Winners (1972, 1980, 1996)	3	3
B4	Portugal	3	Play-off winner	15 November 2011	6th	2008	Runners-up (2004)	9	10

== Standings ==
Pos	Team	Pld	W	D	L	GF	GA	GD	Pts	Qualification
1	Germany	3	3	0	0	5	2	+3	9	Advance to knockout stage
2	Portugal	3	2	0	1	5	4	+1	6	Advance to knockout stage
3	Denmark	3	1	0	2	4	5	−1	3	
4	Netherlands	3	0	0	3	2	5	−3	0	

Source: UEFA
Rules for classification: Group stage tiebreakers

In the quarter-finals,

- The winner of Group B, Germany, advanced to play the runner-up of Group A, Greece.
- The runner-up of Group B, Portugal, advanced to play the winner of Group A, Czech Republic.

== Matches ==
=== Netherlands vs Denmark ===
9 June 2012
19:00

Netherlands	0–1	Denmark
	Report	Krohn-Dehli 24'

Metalist Stadium, Kharkiv
Attendance: 35,923
Referee: Damir Skomina (Slovenia)

Netherlands	Denmark

GK	1	Maarten Stekelenburg
RB	2	Gregory van der Wiel		(substituted off) 85'
CB	3	John Heitinga
CB	13	Ron Vlaar
LB	15	Jetro Willems
CM	8	Nigel de Jong		(substituted off) 71'
CM	6	Mark van Bommel (c)	(yellow card) 67'
RW	11	Arjen Robben
AM	10	Wesley Sneijder
LW	20	Ibrahim Afellay		(substituted off) 71'
CF	16	Robin van Persie
Substitutions:
MF	23	Rafael van der Vaart		(substituted on) 71'
FW	9	Klaas-Jan Huntelaar		(substituted on) 71'
FW	7	Dirk Kuyt		(substituted on) 85'
Manager:
Bert van Marwijk

GK	1	Stephan Andersen
RB	6	Lars Jacobsen
CB	3	Simon Kjær
CB	4	Daniel Agger (c)
LB	5	Simon Poulsen	(yellow card) 78'
CM	7	William Kvist	(yellow card) 81'
CM	21	Niki Zimling
RW	10	Dennis Rommedahl		(substituted off) 84'
AM	8	Christian Eriksen		(substituted off) 74'
LW	9	Michael Krohn-Dehli
CF	11	Nicklas Bendtner
Substitutions:
MF	14	Lasse Schøne		(substituted on) 74'
FW	23	Tobias Mikkelsen		(substituted on) 84'
Manager:
Morten Olsen

Man of the Match:
Michael Krohn-Dehli (Denmark)

Assistant referees:
Primoz Arhar (Slovenia)
Matej Žunič (Slovenia)
Fourth official:
Pavel Královec (Czech Republic)
Additional assistant referees:
Matej Jug (Slovenia)
Slavko Vinčić (Slovenia)
Reserve assistant referee:
Roman Slyško (Slovakia)

=== Germany vs Portugal ===
9 June 2012
21:45

Germany	1–0	Portugal
Gómez 72'	Report

Arena Lviv, Lviv
Attendance: 32,990
Referee: Stéphane Lannoy (France)

Germany	Portugal

GK	1	Manuel Neuer
RB	20	Jérôme Boateng	(yellow card) 69'
CB	5	Mats Hummels
CB	14	Holger Badstuber	(yellow card) 43'
LB	16	Philipp Lahm (c)
CM	6	Sami Khedira
CM	7	Bastian Schweinsteiger
RW	13	Thomas Müller		(substituted off) 90+4'
AM	8	Mesut Özil		(substituted off) 87'
LW	10	Lukas Podolski
CF	23	Mario Gómez		(substituted off) 80'
Substitutions:
FW	11	Miroslav Klose		(substituted on) 80'
MF	18	Toni Kroos		(substituted on) 87'
MF	15	Lars Bender		(substituted on) 90+4'
Manager:
Joachim Löw

GK	12	Rui Patrício
RB	21	João Pereira
CB	2	Bruno Alves
CB	3	Pepe
LB	5	Fábio Coentrão	(yellow card) 60'
CM	16	Raul Meireles		(substituted off) 80'
CM	4	Miguel Veloso
CM	8	João Moutinho
RF	17	Nani
CF	23	Hélder Postiga	(yellow card) 13'	(substituted off) 70'
LF	7	Cristiano Ronaldo (c)
Substitutions:
FW	11	Nélson Oliveira		(substituted on) 70'
FW	18	Silvestre Varela		(substituted on) 80'
Manager:
Paulo Bento

Man of the Match:
Mesut Özil (Germany)

Assistant referees:
Frédéric Cano (France)
Michaël Annonier (France)
Fourth official:
Marcin Borski (Poland)
Additional assistant referees:
Fredy Fautrel (France)
Ruddy Buquet (France)
Reserve assistant referee:
Marcin Borkowski (Poland)

=== Denmark vs Portugal ===
13 June 2012
19:00

Denmark	2–3	Portugal
Bendtner 41', 80'	Report	Pepe 24'; Postiga 36'; Varela 87'

Arena Lviv, Lviv
Attendance: 31,840
Referee: Craig Thomson (Scotland)

Denmark	Portugal

GK	1	Stephan Andersen
RB	6	Lars Jacobsen	(yellow card) 81'
CB	3	Simon Kjær
CB	4	Daniel Agger (c)
LB	5	Simon Poulsen
DM	7	William Kvist
CM	21	Niki Zimling		(substituted off) 16'
RW	10	Dennis Rommedahl		(substituted off) 60'
AM	8	Christian Eriksen
LW	9	Michael Krohn-Dehli		(substituted off) 90+2'
CF	11	Nicklas Bendtner
Substitutions:
MF	19	Jakob Poulsen	(yellow card) 56'	(substituted on) 16'
FW	23	Tobias Mikkelsen		(substituted on) 60'
MF	14	Lasse Schøne		(substituted on) 90+2'
Manager:
Morten Olsen

GK	12	Rui Patrício
RB	21	João Pereira
CB	2	Bruno Alves
CB	3	Pepe
LB	5	Fábio Coentrão
CM	16	Raul Meireles	(yellow card) 29'	(substituted off) 84'
CM	4	Miguel Veloso
CM	8	João Moutinho
RF	17	Nani		(substituted off) 89'
CF	23	Hélder Postiga		(substituted off) 64'
LF	7	Cristiano Ronaldo (c)	(yellow card) 90+2'
Substitutions:
FW	11	Nélson Oliveira		(substituted on) 64'
FW	18	Silvestre Varela		(substituted on) 84'
DF	14	Rolando		(substituted on) 89'
Manager:
Paulo Bento

Man of the Match:
Pepe (Portugal)

Assistant referees:
Alasdair Ross (Scotland)
Derek Rose (Scotland)
Fourth official:
Viktor Shvetsov (Ukraine)
Additional assistant referees:
William Collum (Scotland)
Euan Norris (Scotland)
Reserve assistant referee:
Oleksandr Voytyuk (Ukraine)

=== Netherlands vs Germany ===
13 June 2012
21:45

Netherlands	1–2	Germany
Van Persie 73'	Report	Gómez 24', 38'

Metalist Stadium, Kharkiv
Attendance: 37,750
Referee: Jonas Eriksson (Sweden)

Netherlands	Germany

GK	1	Maarten Stekelenburg
RB	2	Gregory van der Wiel
CB	3	John Heitinga
CB	4	Joris Mathijsen
LB	15	Jetro Willems	(yellow card) 90'
CM	8	Nigel de Jong	(yellow card) 80'
CM	6	Mark van Bommel (c)		(substituted off) 46'
RW	11	Arjen Robben		(substituted off) 83'
AM	10	Wesley Sneijder
LW	20	Ibrahim Afellay		(substituted off) 46'
CF	16	Robin van Persie
Substitutions:
MF	23	Rafael van der Vaart		(substituted on) 46'
FW	9	Klaas-Jan Huntelaar		(substituted on) 46'
FW	7	Dirk Kuyt		(substituted on) 83'
Manager:
Bert van Marwijk

GK	1	Manuel Neuer
RB	20	Jérôme Boateng	(yellow card) 87'
CB	5	Mats Hummels
CB	14	Holger Badstuber
LB	16	Philipp Lahm (c)
CM	6	Sami Khedira
CM	7	Bastian Schweinsteiger
RW	13	Thomas Müller		(substituted off) 90+2'
AM	8	Mesut Özil		(substituted off) 81'
LW	10	Lukas Podolski
CF	23	Mario Gómez		(substituted off) 72'
Substitutions:
FW	11	Miroslav Klose		(substituted on) 72'
MF	18	Toni Kroos		(substituted on) 81'
MF	15	Lars Bender		(substituted on) 90+2'
Manager:
Joachim Löw

Man of the Match:
Mario Gómez (Germany)

Assistant referees:
Stefan Wittberg (Sweden)
Mathias Klasenius (Sweden)
Fourth official:
Tom Harald Hagen (Norway)
Additional assistant referees:
Markus Strömbergsson (Sweden)
Stefan Johannesson (Sweden)
Reserve assistant referee:
Damien MacGraith (Republic of Ireland)

=== Portugal vs Netherlands ===
17 June 2012
21:45

Portugal	2–1	Netherlands
Ronaldo 28', 74'	Report	Van der Vaart 11'

Metalist Stadium, Kharkiv
Attendance: 37,445
Referee: Nicola Rizzoli (Italy)

Portugal	Netherlands

GK	12	Rui Patrício
RB	21	João Pereira	(yellow card) 90+2'
CB	2	Bruno Alves
CB	3	Pepe
LB	5	Fábio Coentrão
CM	16	Raul Meireles		(substituted off) 72'
CM	4	Miguel Veloso
CM	8	João Moutinho
RF	17	Nani		(substituted off) 87'
CF	23	Hélder Postiga		(substituted off) 64'
LF	7	Cristiano Ronaldo (c)
Substitutions:
FW	11	Nélson Oliveira		(substituted on) 64'
MF	6	Custódio		(substituted on) 72'
DF	14	Rolando		(substituted on) 87'
Manager:
Paulo Bento

GK	1	Maarten Stekelenburg
RB	2	Gregory van der Wiel
CB	13	Ron Vlaar
CB	4	Joris Mathijsen
LB	15	Jetro Willems	(yellow card) 51'	(substituted off) 67'
DM	8	Nigel de Jong
CM	23	Rafael van der Vaart (c)
RW	11	Arjen Robben
AM	16	Robin van Persie	(yellow card) 69'
LW	10	Wesley Sneijder
CF	9	Klaas-Jan Huntelaar
Substitutions:
MF	20	Ibrahim Afellay		(substituted on) 67'
Manager:
Bert van Marwijk

Man of the Match:
Cristiano Ronaldo (Portugal)

Assistant referees:
Renato Faverani (Italy)
Andrea Stefani (Italy)
Fourth official:
Martin Atkinson (England)
Additional assistant referees:
Gianluca Rocchi (Italy)
Paolo Tagliavento (Italy)
Reserve assistant referee:
Michael Mullarkey (England)

=== Denmark vs Germany ===
17 June 2012
21:45

Denmark	1–2	Germany
Krohn-Dehli 24'	Report	Podolski 19'; Bender 80'

Arena Lviv, Lviv
Attendance: 32,990
Referee: Carlos Velasco Carballo (Spain)

Denmark	Germany

GK	1	Stephan Andersen
RB	6	Lars Jacobsen
CB	3	Simon Kjær
CB	4	Daniel Agger (c)
LB	5	Simon Poulsen
DM	7	William Kvist
CM	19	Jakob Poulsen	(substituted off) 82'
CM	21	Niki Zimling	(substituted off) 78'
RW	8	Christian Eriksen
LW	9	Michael Krohn-Dehli
CF	11	Nicklas Bendtner
Substitutions:
MF	2	Christian Poulsen	(substituted on) 78'
FW	23	Tobias Mikkelsen	(substituted on) 82'
Manager:
Morten Olsen

GK	1	Manuel Neuer
RB	15	Lars Bender
CB	5	Mats Hummels
CB	14	Holger Badstuber
LB	16	Philipp Lahm (c)
CM	6	Sami Khedira
CM	7	Bastian Schweinsteiger
RW	13	Thomas Müller	(substituted off) 84'
AM	8	Mesut Özil
LW	10	Lukas Podolski	(substituted off) 64'
CF	23	Mario Gómez	(substituted off) 74'
Substitutions:
MF	9	André Schürrle	(substituted on) 64'
FW	11	Miroslav Klose	(substituted on) 74'
MF	18	Toni Kroos	(substituted on) 84'
Manager:
Joachim Löw

Man of the Match:
Lukas Podolski (Germany)

Assistant referees:
Roberto Alonso Fernández (Spain)
Juan Carlos Yuste Jiménez (Spain)
Fourth official:
Mark Clattenburg (England)
Additional assistant referees:
David Fernández Borbalán (Spain)
Carlos Clos Gómez (Spain)
Reserve assistant referee:
Peter Kirkup (England)

== See also ==
- Denmark at the UEFA European Championship
- Germany at the UEFA European Championship
- Netherlands at the UEFA European Championship
- Portugal at the UEFA European Championship
