= UEFA Euro 2000 Group D =

Football tournament group stage

Group D of UEFA Euro 2000 began on 11 June and ended on 21 June 2000. The joint-hosts of the tournament, the Netherlands, won the group ahead of 1998 world champions France. Czech Republic and Denmark were eliminated.

By the time of the final round of matches, both Czech Republic and Denmark had already been eliminated from the tournament, having each lost their opening two matches.

== Teams ==
Draw position	Team	Pot	Method of qualification	Date of qualification	Finals appearance	Last appearance	Previous best performance	UEFA Rankings November 1999 (Note: The UEFA rankings of November 1999 were used for seeding for the final draw.)	FIFA Rankings June 2000
D1	Netherlands	1	Co-host	14 July 1995	6th	1996	Winners (1988)	5	21
D2	Czech Republic (Note: From 1960 to 1980, the Czech Republic competed as Czechoslovakia.)	2	Group 9 winner	9 June 1999	5th	1996	Winners (1976)	6	3
D3	France	3	Group 4 winner	9 October 1999	5th	1996	Winners (1984)	12	2
D4	Denmark	4	Play-off winner	17 November 1999	6th	1996	Winners (1992)	19	13

== Standings ==
Pos	Team	Pld	W	D	L	GF	GA	GD	Pts	Qualification
1	Netherlands (H)	3	3	0	0	7	2	+5	9	Advance to knockout stage
2	France	3	2	0	1	7	4	+3	6	Advance to knockout stage
3	Czech Republic	3	1	0	2	3	3	0	3	
4	Denmark	3	0	0	3	0	8	−8	0	

Source: UEFA
Rules for classification: Group stage tiebreakers
(H) Hosts

In the quarter-finals,

- The winner of Group D, Netherlands, advanced to play the runner-up of Group C, FR Yugoslavia.
- The runner-up of Group D, France, advanced to play the winner of Group C, Spain.

== Matches ==
=== France vs Denmark ===
11 June 2000
18:00

France	3–0	Denmark
Blanc 16'; Henry 64'; Wiltord 90+2'	Report

Jan Breydel Stadium, Bruges
Attendance: 28,100
Referee: Günter Benkö (Austria)

France	Denmark

GK	16	Fabien Barthez
RB	15	Lilian Thuram
CB	8	Marcel Desailly
CB	5	Laurent Blanc
LB	3	Bixente Lizarazu
CM	7	Didier Deschamps (c)
CM	17	Emmanuel Petit
AM	10	Zinedine Zidane
RF	6	Youri Djorkaeff	(substituted off) 58'
CF	9	Nicolas Anelka	(substituted off) 82'
LF	12	Thierry Henry
Substitutions:
MF	4	Patrick Vieira	(substituted on) 58'
FW	13	Sylvain Wiltord	(substituted on) 82'
Manager:
Roger Lemerre

GK	1	Peter Schmeichel (c)
RB	12	Søren Colding
CB	3	René Henriksen
CB	2	Michael Schjønberg	(yellow card) 90'
LB	5	Jan Heintze
RM	19	Morten Bisgaard		(substituted off) 72'
CM	15	Stig Tøfting		(substituted off) 72'
CM	7	Allan Nielsen
LM	8	Jesper Grønkjær
SS	9	Jon Dahl Tomasson		(substituted off) 79'
CF	11	Ebbe Sand
Substitutions:
FW	10	Martin Jørgensen		(substituted on) 72'
MF	20	Thomas Gravesen		(substituted on) 72'
FW	21	Mikkel Beck		(substituted on) 79'
Manager:
(Sweden) Bo Johansson

Man of the Match:
Thierry Henry (France)

Assistant referees:
Ivan Lekov (Bulgaria)
Yuri Dupanov (Belarus)
Fourth official:
Michel Piraux (Belgium)

=== Netherlands vs Czech Republic ===
11 June 2000
20:45

Netherlands	1–0	Czech Republic
F. de Boer 89' (pen.)	Report

Amsterdam Arena, Amsterdam
Attendance: 50,800
Referee: Pierluigi Collina (Italy)

Netherlands	Czech Republic

GK	1	Edwin van der Sar
RB	2	Michael Reiziger
CB	3	Jaap Stam		(substituted off) 75'
CB	4	Frank de Boer (c)	(yellow card) 36'
LB	12	Giovanni van Bronckhorst	(yellow card) 89'
RM	6	Clarence Seedorf		(substituted off) 57'
CM	7	Phillip Cocu
CM	8	Edgar Davids
LM	5	Boudewijn Zenden		(substituted off) 78'
SS	10	Dennis Bergkamp
CF	9	Patrick Kluivert
Substitutions:
MF	16	Ronald de Boer		(substituted on) 57'
DF	13	Bert Konterman		(substituted on) 75'
MF	11	Marc Overmars		(substituted on) 78'
Manager:
Frank Rijkaard

GK	1	Pavel Srníček
CB	2	Tomáš Řepka	(yellow card) 66'
CB	19	Karel Rada
CB	21	Petr Gabriel
DM	3	Radoslav Látal	(red card) 90'	(substituted off) 70'
RM	8	Karel Poborský	(yellow card) 48'
CM	11	Tomáš Rosický
CM	4	Pavel Nedvěd	(yellow card) 22'	(substituted off) 89'
LM	7	Jiří Němec (c)
CF	17	Vladimír Šmicer		(substituted off) 83'
CF	10	Jan Koller
Substitutions:
MF	13	Radek Bejbl		(substituted on) 70'
FW	9	Pavel Kuka		(substituted on) 83'
FW	12	Vratislav Lokvenc		(substituted on) 89'
Manager:
Jozef Chovanec

Man of the Match:
Pavel Nedvěd (Czech Republic)

Assistant referees:
Sergio Zuccolini (Italy)
Turgay Güdü (Turkey)
Fourth official:
Kyros Vassaras (Greece)

=== Czech Republic vs France ===
16 June 2000
18:00

Czech Republic	1–2	France
Poborský 35' (pen.)	Report	Henry 7'; Djorkaeff 60'

Jan Breydel Stadium, Bruges
Attendance: 27,243
Referee: Graham Poll (England)

Czech Republic	France

GK	1	Pavel Srníček
CB	2	Tomáš Řepka
CB	19	Karel Rada
CB	21	Petr Gabriel	(yellow card) 14'	(substituted off) 46'
DM	13	Radek Bejbl		(substituted off) 49'
RM	8	Karel Poborský
CM	11	Tomáš Rosický		(substituted off) 62'
CM	4	Pavel Nedvěd
LM	7	Jiří Němec (c)	(yellow card) 67'
CF	17	Vladimír Šmicer
CF	10	Jan Koller
Substitutions:
DF	5	Milan Fukal		(substituted on) 46'
FW	12	Vratislav Lokvenc		(substituted on) 49'
MF	15	Marek Jankulovski	(yellow card) 69'	(substituted on) 62'
Manager:
Jozef Chovanec

GK	16	Fabien Barthez
RB	15	Lilian Thuram	(yellow card) 62'
CB	8	Marcel Desailly
CB	5	Laurent Blanc
LB	2	Vincent Candela
DM	7	Didier Deschamps (c)
RM	4	Patrick Vieira
LM	17	Emmanuel Petit		(substituted off) 46'
AM	10	Zinedine Zidane
CF	9	Nicolas Anelka		(substituted off) 55'
CF	12	Thierry Henry		(substituted off) 89'
Substitutions:
MF	6	Youri Djorkaeff		(substituted on) 46'
FW	21	Christophe Dugarry		(substituted on) 55'
FW	13	Sylvain Wiltord		(substituted on) 89'
Manager:
Roger Lemerre

Man of the Match:
Thierry Henry (France)

Assistant referees:
Philip Sharp (England)
Eddie Foley (Republic of Ireland)
Fourth official:
Hugh Dallas (Scotland)

=== Denmark vs Netherlands ===
16 June 2000
20:45

Denmark	0–3	Netherlands
	Report	Kluivert 57'; R. de Boer 66'; Zenden 77'

Feijenoord Stadion, Rotterdam
Attendance: 51,425
Referee: Urs Meier (Switzerland)

Denmark	Netherlands

GK	1	Peter Schmeichel (c)
RB	12	Søren Colding
CB	3	René Henriksen
CB	2	Michael Schjønberg		(substituted off) 82'
LB	5	Jan Heintze
RM	19	Morten Bisgaard
CM	20	Thomas Gravesen		(substituted off) 67'
CM	7	Allan Nielsen	(yellow card) 50'	(substituted off) 61'
LM	8	Jesper Grønkjær
SS	9	Jon Dahl Tomasson
CF	11	Ebbe Sand
Substitutions:
MF	15	Stig Tøfting		(substituted on) 61'
MF	14	Brian Steen Nielsen		(substituted on) 67'
DF	6	Thomas Helveg		(substituted on) 82'
Manager:
(Sweden) Bo Johansson

GK	1	Edwin van der Sar	(yellow card) 80'	(substituted off) 89'
RB	2	Michael Reiziger	(yellow card) 10'
CB	13	Bert Konterman	(yellow card) 56'
CB	4	Frank de Boer (c)
LB	12	Giovanni van Bronckhorst	(yellow card) 4'
RM	5	Boudewijn Zenden
CM	7	Phillip Cocu
CM	8	Edgar Davids
LM	11	Marc Overmars		(substituted off) 62'
SS	10	Dennis Bergkamp		(substituted off) 76'
CF	9	Patrick Kluivert
Substitutions:
MF	16	Ronald de Boer		(substituted on) 62'
MF	20	Aron Winter		(substituted on) 76'
GK	22	Sander Westerveld		(substituted on) 89'
Manager:
Frank Rijkaard

Man of the Match:
Frank de Boer (Netherlands)

Assistant referees:
Nicolae Grigorescu (Romania)
Leif Lindberg (Sweden)
Fourth official:
Ľuboš Micheľ (Slovakia)

=== Denmark vs Czech Republic ===
21 June 2000
20:45

Denmark	0–2	Czech Republic
	Report	Šmicer 64', 67'

Stade Maurice Dufrasne, Liège
Attendance: 20,000
Referee: Gamal Al-Ghandour (Egypt)

Denmark	Czech Republic

GK	1	Peter Schmeichel (c)
RB	6	Thomas Helveg
CB	3	René Henriksen
CB	2	Michael Schjønberg
LB	5	Jan Heintze		(substituted off) 68'
RM	17	Bjarne Goldbæk
CM	14	Brian Steen Nielsen
CM	15	Stig Tøfting	(yellow card) 56'
LM	8	Jesper Grønkjær	(yellow card) 52'
SS	9	Jon Dahl Tomasson
CF	21	Mikkel Beck		(substituted off) 74'
Substitutions:
DF	12	Søren Colding		(substituted on) 68'
FW	18	Miklos Molnar	(yellow card) 85'	(substituted on) 74'
Manager:
(Sweden) Bo Johansson

GK	1	Pavel Srníček
CB	5	Milan Fukal	(yellow card) 62'
CB	19	Karel Rada	(yellow card) 69'
CB	2	Tomáš Řepka
DM	13	Radek Bejbl		(substituted off) 62'
RM	8	Karel Poborský	(yellow card) 52'
CM	4	Pavel Nedvěd
CM	7	Jiří Němec (c)
LM	20	Patrik Berger
CF	17	Vladimír Šmicer		(substituted off) 79'
CF	10	Jan Koller		(substituted off) 74'
Substitutions:
MF	15	Marek Jankulovski		(substituted on) 62'
FW	9	Pavel Kuka		(substituted on) 74'
FW	12	Vratislav Lokvenc		(substituted on) 79'
Manager:
Jozef Chovanec

Man of the Match:
Vladimír Šmicer (Czech Republic)

Assistant referees:
Carlos Martín Nieto (Spain)
Ivan Lekov (Bulgaria)
Fourth official:
José María García-Aranda (Spain)

=== France vs Netherlands ===
21 June 2000
20:45

France	2–3	Netherlands
Dugarry 8'; Trezeguet 31'	Report	Kluivert 14'; F. de Boer 51'; Zenden 59'

Amsterdam Arena, Amsterdam
Attendance: 50,000
Referee: Anders Frisk (Sweden)

France	Netherlands

GK	1	Bernard Lama
RB	19	Christian Karembeu
CB	8	Marcel Desailly (c)	(yellow card) 75'
CB	18	Frank Leboeuf
LB	2	Vincent Candela
RM	11	Robert Pires
CM	4	Patrick Vieira	(yellow card) 90'	(substituted off) 90+2'
LM	14	Johan Micoud
RF	21	Christophe Dugarry	(yellow card) 45'	(substituted off) 67'
CF	20	David Trezeguet
LF	13	Sylvain Wiltord		(substituted off) 80'
Substitutions:
MF	6	Youri Djorkaeff		(substituted on) 67'
FW	9	Nicolas Anelka		(substituted on) 80'
MF	7	Didier Deschamps		(substituted on) 90+2'
Manager:
Roger Lemerre

GK	22	Sander Westerveld
RB	15	Paul Bosvelt
CB	3	Jaap Stam
CB	4	Frank de Boer (c)
LB	19	Arthur Numan
RM	11	Marc Overmars		(substituted off) 89'
CM	7	Phillip Cocu	(yellow card) 85'
CM	8	Edgar Davids	(yellow card) 81'
LM	5	Boudewijn Zenden
SS	10	Dennis Bergkamp		(substituted off) 78'
CF	9	Patrick Kluivert		(substituted off) 60'
Substitutions:
FW	21	Roy Makaay		(substituted on) 60'
MF	20	Aron Winter		(substituted on) 78'
FW	14	Peter van Vossen		(substituted on) 89'
Manager:
Frank Rijkaard

Man of the Match:
Edgar Davids (Netherlands)

Assistant referees:
Leif Lindberg (Sweden)
Sergio Zuccolini (Italy)
Fourth official:
Markus Merk (Germany)

== See also ==
- Czech Republic at the UEFA European Championship
- Denmark at the UEFA European Championship
- France at the UEFA European Championship
- Netherlands at the UEFA European Championship
