= Lars Elstrup =

Danish footballer (born 1963)

Personal information
- Full name: Lars Dahl Elstrup
- Date of birth: 24 March 1963 (age 63)
- Place of birth: Råby, Denmark
- Height: 1.82 m (6 ft 0 in)
- Position: Forward

Youth career
- –1980: IF Fjorden i Havndal

Senior career*
Years	Team	Apps	(Gls)
1981–1985	Randers Freja	136	(59)
1986	Brøndby IF	7	(2)
1986–1988	Feyenoord	65	(9)
1988–1989	Odense BK	28	(17)
1989–1991	Luton Town	60	(19)
1991–1993	Odense BK	44	(24)
Total		340	(130)

International career
1988–1993	Denmark	34	(13)
Medal record
Men's football
Representing Denmark
UEFA European Championship
Winner	1992 Sweden
CONMEBOL–UEFA Cup of Champions
Runner-up	1993 Argentina
- * Club domestic league appearances and goals

Lars Dahl Elstrup (born 24 March 1963) is a Danish former professional footballer, who played as a forward for a number of Danish clubs, as well as Dutch club Feyenoord and English club Luton Town. He played 34 matches and scored 13 goals for the Denmark national team, and was part of the Denmark team which won the 1992 European Championship.

== Club career ==
Born in the village of Råby, 20 km NE of Randers, Lars Elstrup made his senior debut for local club Randers Sportsklub Freja in 1982. Over the next four seasons, he became a proven goalscorer in Danish football's mostly 2nd highest divisions, and before the 1986 season Elstrup moved to the defending champions Brøndby IF. He played just seven league games for Brøndby, scoring twice, before he moved abroad to play for Dutch club Feyenoord. He played there for two years, but only scored nine goals for the Rotterdam outfit.

In 1988, Elstrup moved back to Denmark to play for Odense BK. He scored 14 goals in 16 games in his first season at Odense, and was called up for the Denmark national team by national manager Sepp Piontek.

The 1989 Danish 1st Division saw Elstrup score three times in 12 league games, before he left to try his hand at English football. Elstrup signed for English First Division club Luton Town on 21 August 1989 in a £850,000 transfer deal, setting a club transfer record. Playing at Kenilworth Road for two seasons, he soon settled and scored a total of 18 goals to keep Luton up in 1990–91.

After only two years in England, Elstrup moved back to Denmark to rejoin Odense. Odense only paid £200,000, despite having sold him to Luton only two years before for more than four times that amount, and having attained an impressive goalscoring record at the English club, as well as still being in his twenties. Sure enough, after selling Elstrup, Luton were relegated. He played two more seasons for Odense, scoring 24 goals, before retiring in strange circumstances. These strange circumstances were due to damage to body and mind, quote Lars Elstrup himself.

== International career ==
Elstrup made his national team debut in August 1988 against Sweden, and scored both goals in a 2–1 victory.

Elstrup was part of the Denmark squad for the 1992 European Championship. He played in two matches at the tournament, and scored the winning goal in the 2–1 win against France in the group stages. He also scored one of Denmark's five penalties in the semi-final penalty shootout against Netherlands, though he was an unused substitute, as Denmark beat Germany 2–0 in the final.

== Personal life ==
In 1993, Elstrup had doubts about his footballing future, as he felt he was living under the expectations of others. He joined a spiritual sect, and took the spiritual name "Darando", meaning "The River that Flows into the Sea". He moved away from the sect in December 1999 after being arrested for punching a school child. In January 2000, Odense gave Elstrup a chance to re-enter professional football by giving him a trial, but he left the club soon after when the club refused to pay him during the trial. He now lives in Odense, and stays out of the public eye.

== Honours ==
Odense BK

- Danish 1st Division: 1989
- Danish Cup: 1993

Denmark

- UEFA European Championship: 1992
