= Ronald de Boer =

Dutch footballer (born 1970)

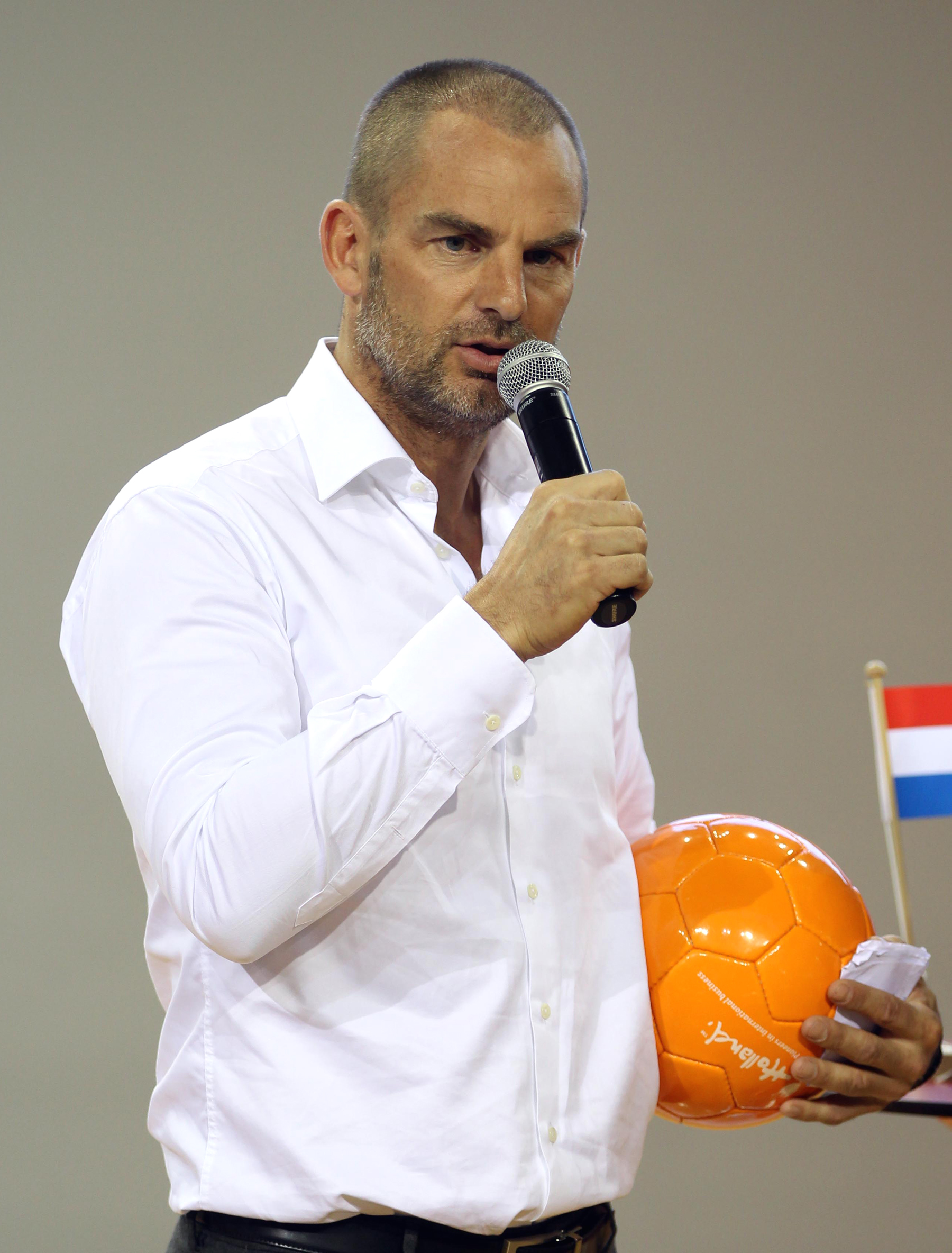
- De Boer in 2012

Personal information
- Full name: Ronaldus de Boer
- Date of birth: 15 May 1970 (age 56)
- Place of birth: Hoorn, Netherlands
- Height: 1.80 m (5 ft 11 in)
- Positions: Midfielder; winger

Youth career
- VV De Zouaven
- 1983–1988: Ajax

Senior career*
Years	Team	Apps	(Gls)
1988–1991	Ajax	52	(14)
1991–1993	Twente	49	(22)
1993–1999	Ajax	172	(36)
1999–2000	Barcelona	33	(1)
2000–2004	Rangers	91	(32)
2004–2005	Al-Rayyan	22	(3)
2005–2008	Al-Shamal	56	(8)
Total		475	(116)

International career
1993–2003	Netherlands	67	(13)

Managerial career
- 2010–2011: Qatar Olympic (assistant)
- 2010–2011: Qatar U–23 (assistant)
Medal record
Men's football
Representing Netherlands
UEFA European Championship
Bronze medal – third place	2000
- * Club domestic league appearances and goals

Ronaldus de Boer (Dutch pronunciation: [ˈroːnɑl də ˈbuːr]; born 15 May 1970) is a Dutch former professional footballer who played as a right or attacking midfielder or right winger. He played for the Netherlands national team as well as a host of professional clubs in Europe. He is the twin brother of Frank de Boer. The majority of his success as a football player was with Ajax. He works as the Ajax A1 assistant manager.

== Club career ==
De Boer's first youth club was De Zouaven in Lutjebroek where he played before being selected for the Ajax youth programme in 1983. On the professional club level, De Boer played for Ajax (1988–91 and 1993–99), Twente (1991–93), Barcelona (1999–2000), Rangers (2000–04), Al-Rayyan (2004–05) and Al-Shamal (2005–08). In both Qatari clubs, he was reunited again with his brother Frank, his teammate at Ajax, Barcelona and Rangers.

In his first spell at Ajax from 1988 to 1991, he won the Eredivisie title in 1989–90 under manager Leo Beenhakker. After two seasons at Twente from 1991 to 1993, he returned to Ajax under manager Louis van Gaal, and had his most successful spell as a player, winning three consecutive Eredivisie titles in 1993–94, 1994–95 and 1995–96. He also won the 1995 UEFA Champions League, the 1995 Intercontinental Cup, and the 1995 UEFA Super Cup. He was also a runner-up of the 1996 UEFA Champions League, where Ajax lost on penalties to Juventus. When Louis van Gaal left Ajax for Barcelona in July 1997, Morten Olsen became the new Ajax manager, and De Boer won a fifth Eredivisie title in 1997–98 and also won the 1997–98 KNVB Cup.

There was then controversy soon after De Boer and his twin brother Frank signed a six-year contract extension with Ajax at the start 1998–99 season, when Ronald and Frank took successful legal action to have the contract voided. Ajax had agreed verbally that if a lucrative offer for one brother came by, he would be released provided the other stayed. Ajax, however, apparently backed down on that agreement after floating the club on the stock market and pledging to shareholders that it would hold both of the De Boers and build around them a team to recapture the UEFA Champions League.

The fallout over the contract situation led to an increasing conflict between the De Boer twins and the Ajax hierarchy, with match results for Ajax suffering and manager Morten Olsen soon getting sacked. In January 1999, Frank and Ronald signed for Barcelona for £22 million, joining their former Ajax manager Louis van Gaal at the Camp Nou.

While De Boer was impressive at Ajax during the 1990s and for the Netherlands up to and including the 1998 FIFA World Cup, his high-profile transfer to Barcelona in January 1999 marked what would be an unlikely bad patch for a prolific goal-scoring midfielder, as he managed to feature in only 33 La Liga games for the club and scored just one goal in La Liga. In the 2000–01 season, he opted to join the Dutch legion at Rangers under the manager Dick Advocaat. Among the Dutch internationals who at that time played for Rangers were Bert Konterman, Arthur Numan, Fernando Ricksen and Giovanni van Bronckhorst. De Boer made his debut in a Scottish League Cup tie against Aberdeen on 6 September 2000, and scored his first goal for the club in a UEFA Champions League tie against Sturm Graz. De Boer didn't win any silverware at the end of his first season at the club, but the following season (2001–02) Rangers won both the Scottish League Cup and the Scottish Cup, though De Boer missed the former final through injury. The following season, 2002–03, brought even more success as De Boer helped Rangers win a domestic treble of League, Scottish Cup and Scottish League Cup. In total he spent four seasons with the club before joining Al-Rayyan after the 2003–04 season.

De Boer recovered from surgery on a neck injury and decided not to play in Al-Shamal's last two games of the 2006–07 season. On 19 March 2008, De Boer canceled his contract with Qatari outfit Al-Shamal and retired.

== International career ==
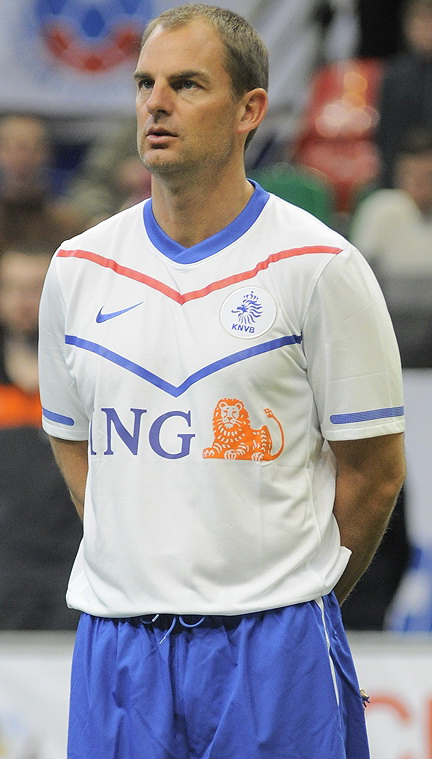
Ronald de Boer in Netherlands colours

De Boer won 67 caps and scored 13 goals for the Netherlands national team. He played for the Netherlands in the 1994 and the 1998 World Cups, where he played in six matches and scored two goals. He missed a penalty in the penalty shootout against Brazil in the 1998 semi-finals. De Boer also played in Euro 1996 and Euro 2000.

In the Dutch national team, De Boer was used in various positions, including right-half, centre forward and attacking midfielder. In his early Ajax years, De Boer played either centre forward or attacking midfielder. In later years, he shifted to right midfield.

De Boer was never officially captain of the Dutch national team or Ajax, but he has worn the captain's armband on several occasions for both club teams and the national team when the first-choice captain was not playing. In most teams, this was his brother Frank, with whom he has played side by side for most of his career.

== Managerial career ==
De Boer is Ajax A1 assistant manager.

== Media ==
De Boer featured in EA Sports' FIFA video game series; he was on the cover for the International edition of FIFA 96, alongside Jason McAteer.

== Career statistics ==
=== Club ===
Appearances and goals by club, season and competition
Club	Season	League			National cup		League cup		Continental		Other		Total	
Club	Season	Division	Apps	Goals	Apps	Goals	Apps	Goals	Apps	Goals	Apps	Goals	Apps	Goals
Ajax	1987–88	Eredivisie	1	1	0	0	–						1	1
Ajax	1988–89	Eredivisie	17	5	1	0	–						18	5
Ajax	1989–90	Eredivisie	20	7	3	0	–		2	0			25	7
Ajax	1990–91	Eredivisie	14	1	3	0	–						17	1
Ajax	Total		52	14	7	0	0	0	2	0	0	0	61	14
Twente	1991–92	Eredivisie	33	11	1	0	–						34	11
Twente	1992–93	Eredivisie	16	11	2	0	–						18	11
Twente	Total		49	22	3	0	0	0	0	0	0	0	52	22
Ajax	1992–93	Eredivisie	15	5	3	0	–						18	5
Ajax	1993–94	Eredivisie	28	5	4	2	–		6	2	1	0	39	9
Ajax	1994–95	Eredivisie	25	5	3	4	–		10	2	1 (Note: Appearance in Johan Cruyff Shield)	0	39	11
Ajax	1995–96	Eredivisie	31	7	1	1	–		11	1	3 (Note: One appearance in Intercontinental Cup, one appearance in UEFA Super Cup, one appearance and one goal in Johan Cruyff Shield)	1	46	10
Ajax	1996–97	Eredivisie	28	5	1	0	–		10	1	1	0	40	6
Ajax	1997–98	Eredivisie	31	7	4	0	–		8	0	–		43	7
Ajax	1998–99	Eredivisie	15	2	1	0	–		6	0			22	2
Ajax	Total		173	36	17	7	0	0	51	6	6	1	247	50
Barcelona	1998–99	La Liga	13	0	4	1	–						17	1
Barcelona	1999–2000	La Liga	20	1	6	0	–		11	0	1 (Note: Appearance in Supercopa de España)	1	38	2
Barcelona	Total		33	1	10	1	0	0	11	0	1	1	55	3
Rangers	2000–01	Scottish Premier League	17	6	1	0	1	0	7	1	–		26	7
Rangers	2001–02	Scottish Premier League	25	8	4	0	3	0	7	2	–		39	10
Rangers	2002–03	Scottish Premier League	33	16	5	1	3	1	2	2	–		43	20
Rangers	2003–04	Scottish Premier League	16	2	2	1	1	0	2	0	–		21	3
Rangers	Total		91	32	12	2	8	1	18	5	0	0	129	40
Al-Rayyan	2004–05	Qatar Stars League	22	3							–		22	3
Al-Shamal	2005–06	Qatar Stars League	17	5							–		22	3
Al-Shamal	2006–07	Qatar Stars League	24	3							–		22	3
Al-Shamal	2007–08	Qatar Stars League	15	0							–		22	3
Al-Shamal	Total		56	8	0	0	0	0	0	0	0	0	56	8
Career total			476	116	49	10	8	1	82	11	7	2	622	140

=== International ===
Appearances and goals by national team and year
National team	Year	Apps	Goals
Netherlands	1993	4	3
Netherlands	1994	11	3
Netherlands	1995	7	0
Netherlands	1996	10	3
Netherlands	1997	4	0
Netherlands	1998	13	3
Netherlands	1999	7	0
Netherlands	2000	7	1
Netherlands	2001	1	0
Netherlands	2002	2	0
Netherlands	2003	1	0
Total		67	13

International goals

Scores and results list Netherlands' goal tally first

Goal	Date	Venue	Opponent	Score	Result	Competition
1.	24 March 1993	Stadion Galgenwaard, Utrecht, Netherlands	San Marino	4–0	6–0	1994 FIFA World Cup qualification
2.	22 September 1993	Stadio Renato Dall'Ara, Bologna, Italy	San Marino	4–0	7–0	1994 FIFA World Cup qualification
3.	17 November 1993	Stadion Miejski, Poznań, Poland	Poland	3–1	3–1	1994 FIFA World Cup qualification
4.	7 September 1994	Stade Josy Barthel, Luxembourg City, Luxembourg	Luxembourg	2–0	4–0	UEFA Euro 1996 qualifying
5.	7 September 1994	Stade Josy Barthel, Luxembourg City, Luxembourg	Luxembourg	3–0	4–0	UEFA Euro 1996 qualifying
6.	14 December 1994	De Kuip, Rotterdam, Netherlands	Luxembourg	4–0	5–0	UEFA Euro 1996 qualifying
7.	31 August 1996	Amsterdam Arena, Amsterdam, Netherlands	Brazil	1–1	2–2	Friendly
8.	5 October 1996	Cardiff Arms Park, Cardiff, Wales	Wales	3–1	3–1	1998 FIFA World Cup qualification
9.	9 November 1996	Philips Stadion, Eindhoven, Netherlands	Wales	2–0	7–1	1998 FIFA World Cup qualification
10.	21 February 1998	Pro Player Stadium, Miami Gardens, United States	United States	1–0	2–0	Friendly
11.	20 June 1998	Stade Vélodrome, Marseille, France	South Korea	5–0	5–0	1998 FIFA World Cup
12.	25 June 1998	Stade Geoffroy-Guichard, Saint-Étienne, France	Mexico	2–0	2–2	1998 FIFA World Cup
13.	16 June 2000	De Kuip, Rotterdam, Netherlands	Denmark	2–0	3–0	UEFA Euro 2000

== Honours ==
Ajax

- Eredivisie: 1989–90, 1993–94, 1994–95, 1995–96, 1997–98
- KNVB Cup: 1997–98
- Johan Cruyff Shield: 1993, 1994, 1995
- UEFA Champions League: 1994–95
- UEFA Super Cup: 1995
- Intercontinental Cup: 1995

Barcelona

- La Liga: 1998–99

Rangers

- Scottish Premier League: 2002–03
- Scottish Cup: 2001–02, 2002–03
- Scottish League Cup: 2002–03

Al Rayyan

- Emir of Qatar Cup: 2005

Individual

- Dutch Footballer of the Year: 1994, 1996
- Ballon d'Or: 1996 (28th), 1998 (21st)
