= Michael Krohn-Dehli =

Danish footballer (born 1983)

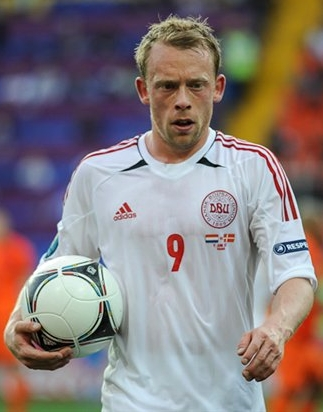
- Krohn-Dehli with Denmark at UEFA Euro 2012

Personal information
- Full name: Michael Krohn-Dehli
- Date of birth: 6 June 1983 (age 43)
- Place of birth: Copenhagen, Denmark
- Height: 1.71 m (5 ft 7 in)
- Position: Midfielder

Youth career
- Rosenhøj BK
- Hvidovre
- 2000–2002: Brøndby
- 2002–2004: Ajax

Senior career*
Years	Team	Apps	(Gls)
2004–2006	RKC Waalwijk	48	(2)
2006–2008	Ajax	4	(0)
2006–2007	→ Sparta Rotterdam (loan)	12	(1)
2008–2012	Brøndby	122	(26)
2012–2015	Celta Vigo	101	(3)
2015–2018	Sevilla	42	(2)
2018–2019	Deportivo La Coruña	25	(0)
Total		354	(34)

International career
2000–2001	Denmark U19	5	(0)
2002–2004	Denmark U20	10	(4)
2004–2006	Denmark U21	8	(2)
2006–2018	Denmark	62	(6)
- * Club domestic league appearances and goals

Michael Krohn-Dehli (Danish: [ˈmiˌkʰɛˀl ˈkʰʁoˀn ˈte̝ːli]; born 6 June 1983) is a Danish former professional footballer. He played mostly as an attacking midfielder, but was also deployed as a winger.

A technically gifted player, Krohn-Dehli started his professional career in the Netherlands, but would make his breakthrough for native childhood club, Brøndby IF, where he amassed 26 goals in 122 Danish Superliga appearances. This earned him a move to Celta in Spain, where he remained for the rest of his career, also representing Sevilla and Deportivo La Coruña.

A Danish international, Krohn-Dehli won 62 caps for the country, representing it at the 2018 World Cup and at Euro 2012.

== Club career ==
=== Early career ===
Born in Copenhagen, Krohn-Dehli began playing football at Rosenhøj BK in Denmark. After that he played for Danish clubs Hvidovre IF and Brøndby IF.

In 2002, Krohn-Dehli joined Ajax from Brøndby. He excelled as a youth team player for Ajax under Danny Blind. In 2004, however, he was allowed to leave Ajax by manager Ronald Koeman and he joined RKC Waalwijk on a free transfer. There he made his professional debut on 15 August 2004 in a goalless draw against Groningen.

=== Return to Ajax ===
Two years later, Krohn-Dehli was re-signed by Ajax on a free transfer until 2009. The midfielder made his debut for Ajax on 17 September 2006 in a 2–0 league win against Roda JC Kerkrade. After the winter break with only three appearances for Ajax he was sent on loan to Sparta Rotterdam on 31 January 2007 for the remainder of the season. Five days later he made his first out of 12 appearances for Sparta against Roda JC Kerkrade. After his spell at Sparta and the summer break he returned to Ajax for the 2007–08 season.

=== Return to Brøndby ===
Ajax announced on 29 August 2008 that they would transfer Krohn-Dehli to Danish club Brøndby IF. He made his debut two days later on 31 August against FC Copenhagen.

=== Celta ===
On 21 August 2012, it was announced that Krohn-Dehli would be joining Celta de Vigo after completing a medical. His performances in 2014 led to interest from Newcastle United.

=== Sevilla ===
On 1 June 2015, Krohn-Dehli officially signed a two-year contract with fellow La Liga team Sevilla.

On 28 April 2016, he dislocated his left kneecap shortly after being subbed on in the first UEFA Europa League semi-final at Arena Lviv against Shakhtar Donetsk, much to the dismay of both teammates and opponents. He had knee surgery performed the following day at Clínica Sagrado Corazón de Sevilla after having flown back home with the rest of the squad. Later that day, following the surgery, Sevilla FC released a statement on the club's website, revealing that he would miss seven to eight months of action, depending on his rehabilitation. Almost six months later to the day, on 27 October, Sevilla released footage of a recovering Krohn-Dehli running on one of the club's training grounds. One month later, Krohn-Dehli was back on the training pitch with the rest of the squad.

=== Deportivo La Coruña ===
On 29 January 2018, Krohn-Dehli joined La Liga side Deportivo La Coruña on a free transfer and a one-and-a-half-year contract. Following the club's relegation from the highest tier, Krohn-Dehli was released in July 2019. On 10 July 2020, a year after leaving Deportivo, Krohn-Dehli announced through his agent that he had officially retired from professional football and would pursuit a career as a pundit.

== International career ==
Krohn-Dehli made his debut for the Denmark national team in a Euro 2008 qualification match against Liechtenstein on 11 October 2006.

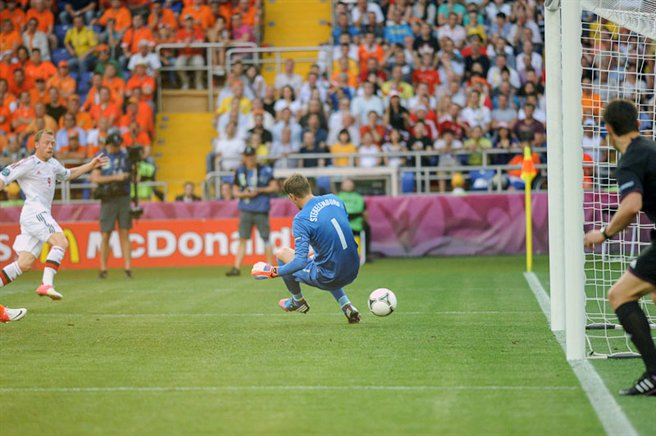
Krohn-Dehli scoring the winner against the Netherlands at Euro 2012

Krohn-Dehli scored the only goal in Denmark's 1–0 victory over the Netherlands in UEFA Euro 2012. After that match, Krohn-Dehli said he was satisfied with scoring and told reporters after the game, "It's a little bit special for me as I played for eight years in Holland and have a Dutch girlfriend, so I think the whole family was cheering in Holland". He also scored the lone goal for Denmark in the final group stage game against Germany, a 1–2 loss.

In May 2018 he was named in Denmark's preliminary 35-man squad for the 2018 FIFA World Cup in Russia, returning after a 3-year absence.

After the World Cup, he announced his retirement from the national team.

== Career statistics ==
=== Club ===
Appearances and goals by club, season and competition
Club	Season	League			National Cup (Note: Includes Danish Cup, Copa del Rey)		Europe (Note: Includes UEFA Europa League, UEFA Champions League, UEFA Super Cup)		Total	
Club	Season	Division	Apps	Goals	Apps	Goals	Apps	Goals	Apps	Goals
RKC Waalwijk	2004–05	Eredivisie	31	2	—		—		31	2
RKC Waalwijk	2005–06	Eredivisie	17	0	—		—		17	0
RKC Waalwijk	Total		48	2	0	0	0	0	48	2
Ajax	2006–07	Eredivisie	3	0	—		—		3	0
Ajax	2007–08	Eredivisie	1	0	—		—		1	0
Ajax	Total		4	0	0	0	0	0	4	0
Sparta Rotterdam	2006–07	Eredivisie	12	1	—		—		12	1
Brøndby IF	2008–09	Superligaen	28	5	—		2	1	30	6
Brøndby IF	2009–10	Superligaen	32	4	—		6	0	38	4
Brøndby IF	2010–11	Superligaen	29	12	—		5	0	34	12
Brøndby IF	2011–12	Superligaen	27	5	1	0	2	1	30	6
Brøndby IF	2012–13	Superligaen	6	0	—		—		6	0
Brøndby IF	Total		122	26	1	0	15	2	138	28
Celta Vigo	2012–13	La Liga	34	1	3	0	—		37	1
Celta Vigo	2013–14	La Liga	31	0	2	0	—		33	0
Celta Vigo	2014–15	La Liga	36	1	2	0	—		38	1
Celta Vigo	Total		101	2	7	0	0	0	108	2
Sevilla	2015–16	La Liga	27	1	6	3	14	0	47	4
Sevilla	2016–17	La Liga	2	0	0	0	—		2	0
Sevilla	2017–18	La Liga	13	1	2	0	3	0	18	1
Sevilla	Total		42	2	8	3	17	0	67	5
Deportivo La Coruña	2017–18	La Liga	11	0	0	0	—		11	0
Deportivo La Coruña	2018–19	Segunda División	14	0	1	0	—		15	0
Deportivo La Coruña	Total		25	0	1	0	—		26	0
Career total			354	33	17	3	32	2	403	38

=== International ===
Appearances and goals by national team and year
Team	Year	Apps	Goals
Denmark
Denmark	2006	1	0
Denmark	2007	–	–
Denmark	2008	2	0
Denmark	2009	–	–
Denmark	2010	8	0
Denmark	2011	10	4
Denmark	2012	11	2
Denmark	2013	11	0
Denmark	2014	7	0
Denmark	2015	9	0
Denmark	2016	–	–
Denmark	2017	–	–
Denmark	2018	3	0
Total		62	6

Denmark score listed first, score column indicates score after each Krohn-Dehli goal.

List of international goals scored by Michael Krohn-Dehli
No.	Date	Venue	Opponent	Score	Result	Competition
1.	29 March 2011	Štadión Antona Malatinského, Trnava, Slovakia	Slovakia	2–1	2–1	Friendly
2.	7 October 2011	GSP Stadium, Nicosia, Cyprus	Cyprus	3–0	4–1	UEFA Euro 2012 qualifying
3.	11 October 2011	Parken, Copenhagen, Denmark	Portugal	1–0	2–1	UEFA Euro 2012 qualifying
4.	11 November 2011	Parken, Copenhagen, Denmark	Sweden	2–0	2–0	Friendly
5.	9 June 2012	Metalist Stadium, Kharkiv, Ukraine	Netherlands	1–0	1–0	UEFA Euro 2012
6.	17 June 2012	Arena Lviv, Lviv, Ukraine	Germany	1–1	1–2	UEFA Euro 2012

== Honours ==
Sevilla

- UEFA Europa League: 2015–16
