= 2001–02 Rangers F.C. season =

Rangers
2001–02 season
- Chairman: David Murray
- Manager: Dick Advocaat (until 12 December); Alex McLeish (from 13 December)
- Ground: Ibrox Stadium
- Scottish Premier League: 2nd
- Scottish Cup: Winners
- League Cup: Winners
- Champions League: Third qualifying round
- UEFA Cup: Fourth round
- Top goalscorer: League: Tore André Flo (18); All: Tore André Flo (25)
Home colours	Away colours	Third colours

The 2001–02 season was the 122nd season of competitive football by Rangers.

== Overview ==
Rangers played a total of 59 competitive matches during the 2001–02 season. The side won both the Scottish League Cup and Scottish Cup in 2001–02, while finishing second in the Scottish Premier League.

The season started under the Management of Dutchman Dick Advocaat. Inconsistent form including two losses to Celtic meant that by December, Rangers were behind Celtic in the league. Advocaat announced his resignation in December, moving to the position of Director of Football and Hibernian manager Alex McLeish took over. Rangers league form improved under McLeish with only one defeat taking place under him before the end of the season, but the gap opened up by Celtic meant no challenge to win the league was possible.

McLeish lead Rangers to success in the two domestic cup competitions. In the League Cup semi-final Rangers beat Celtic 2-1 after extra time with a long range Bert Konterman goal proving to be the winner. They would then go on to win the competition with a 4–0 win over Ayr United in the final. In the Scottish Cup Rangers against faced Celtic, this time in the final. A dramatic last minute goal from Peter Løvenkrands saw Rangers win the game 3–2.

In Europe Rangers went out of the UEFA Champions League third qualifying round to Fenerbache and therefore dropped into the UEFA Cup. Rangers progressed in this competition and a penalty shoot-out win over PSG saw them stay in Europe beyond Christmas for the first time in nine years. Rangers then narrowly lost the next round to eventual UEFA Cup winners Feyenoord.

== Players ==
=== Appearances ===
				Total			Scottish Premier League		Scottish Cup		League Cup		Champions League		UEFA Cup	
No.	Pos.	Nat.	Name	Sts	App	Gls	App	Gls	App	Gls	App	Gls	App	Gls	App	Gls
1	GK	(Germany)	Stefan Klos	57	57		36		6		4		4		7	
2	DF	(Netherlands)	Fernando Ricksen	47	47	5	31	4	4		3		4	1	5	
3	DF	(Australia)	Craig Moore	29	29	3	18	3	2		2		3		4	
4	DF	(Italy)	Lorenzo Amoruso	47	47	6	28	4	6	1	4		2		7	1
5	DF	(Netherlands)	Arthur Numan	43	45	2	30	1	2		3	1	3		7	
6	MF	(Scotland)	Barry Ferguson	37	39	6	22	1	5	2	3	1	2		7	2
7	FW	(Argentina)	Claudio Caniggia	31	42	9	24	5	3		4	2	4	2	7	
8	MF	(Germany)	Christian Nerlinger	10	11	4	8	1	1	2			2	1		
9	FW	(Norway)	Tore André Flo	39	46	25	30	18	3	2	2	1	4	3	7	1
10	FW	(Netherlands)	Michael Mols	10	24	2	15	2	2		2		2		3	
11	MF	(Scotland)	Neil McCann	22	38	7	25	6	5		2		3		3	1
12	MF	(United States)	Claudio Reyna	17	17	3	10	2			1	1	3		3	
14	MF	(Netherlands)	Ronald de Boer	31	39	10	25	8	4		3		1		6	2
15	DF	(Netherlands)	Bert Konterman	41	42	5	26	2	2	1	3	1	4		7	1
16	FW	(Scotland)	Billy Dodds	6	16	6	11	2	3	4	1		1			
17	MF	(Russia)	Andrei Kanchelskis	9	14	2	10	1	3	1			1			
18	DF	(England)	Michael Ball	8	11	1	7				2				2	1
19	DF	(Scotland)	Scott Wilson	10	12		6		1		1		3		1	
20	MF	(Trinidad and Tobago)	Russell Latapy	21	29	5	16	5	3		3		2		5	
21	DF	(Scotland)	Maurice Ross	24	29		21		4		1		1		2	
22	GK	(Denmark)	Jesper Christiansen													
23	FW	(Scotland)	Kenny Miller		3		3									
24	MF	(Scotland)	Allan Johnston	1	1		1									
24	FW	(Georgia (country))	Shota Arveladze	27	30	17	22	11	5	3	3	3				
25	DF	(Australia)	Tony Vidmar	34	38	1	24	1	5		3		3		3	
26	MF	(Denmark)	Peter Løvenkrands	18	32	7	19	2	4	3	3	1			6	1
27	MF	(Scotland)	Stephen Hughes	18	28	1	17	1	4		2		3		2	
28	DF	(Poland)	Dariusz Adamczuk													
29	DF	(Finland)	Tero Penttilä		1		1									
31	DF	(Scotland)	Robert Malcolm	7	8		7		1							
33	GK	(Scotland)	Allan McGregor	3	3		2		1							
36	DF	(Scotland)	Andy Dowie		1		1									
39	MF	(Scotland)	Jimmy Gibson		2		1				1					
46	FW	(Scotland)	Tom Brighton	1	1		1									
48	MF	(Scotland)	Chris Burke	1	2	1	2	1								

Ordered by number
0 shown as blank

== Transfers ==
=== In ===
Date	Player	From	Fee
25 June 2001	(Argentina) Claudio Caniggia	(Scotland) Dundee	£900,000
26 June 2001	(Germany) Christian Nerlinger	(Germany) Borussia Dortmund	£1,800,000
3 July 2001	(Trinidad and Tobago) Russell Latapy	(Scotland) Hibernian	Free
17 August 2001	(England) Michael Ball	(England) Everton	£6,500,000
29 August 2001	(Georgia (country)) Shota Arveladze	(Netherlands) Ajax	£3,000,000

=== Out ===
Date	Player	To	Fee
22 May 2001	(Finland) Tero Penttilä	(Finland) FC Haka	Loan
24 May 2001	(Germany) Jörg Albertz	(Germany) Hamburger SV	£3,000,000
30 May 2001	(Scotland) Mark Brown	(Scotland) Motherwell	Free
1 June 2001	(Italy) Sergio Porrini	(Italy) Alessandria	Free
1 June 2001	(England) Rod Wallace	(England) Bolton Wanderers	Free
20 June 2001	(Netherlands) Giovanni van Bronckhorst	(England) Arsenal	£8,500,000
19 July 2001	(Turkey) Tugay Kerimoğlu	(England) Blackburn Rovers	£1,300,000
3 August 2001	(Scotland) Peter MacDonald	(Scotland) St Johnstone	£125,000
6 August 2001	(Northern Ireland) Stephen Carson	(Scotland) Dundee United	£150,000
7 August 2001	(Jamaica) Marcus Gayle	(England) Watford	£900,000
9 August 2001	(Poland) Dariusz Adamczuk	(England) Wigan Athletic	Loan
31 August 2001	(Scotland) Allan Johnston	(England) Middlesbrough	£600,000
7 December 2001	(United States) Claudio Reyna	(England) Sunderland	£4,000,000
14 December 2001	(Scotland) Kenny Miller	(England) Wolverhampton Wanderers	£3,000,000
28 January 2002	(Denmark) Jesper Christiansen	(Denmark) Vejle Boldklub	Loan
28 January 2002	(England) Paul Reid	(England) Preston North End	Loan
28 March 2002	(Scotland) Scott Wilson	(England) Portsmouth	Loan

- Expenditure: ▼£12,200,000
- Income: ▲£21,575,000
- Total loss/gain: ▲£9,375,000

== Results ==
All results are written with Rangers' score first.

=== Friendlies ===
Date	Opponent	Venue	Result	Attendance	Scorers
5 July 2001	VV DOVO	A	7–0	4,000	Miller (3), de Boer, Numan, Dodds, Kanchelskis
7 July 2001	VV Capelle	A	5–1	3,500	Johnston (2), Caniggia, de Boer, Gayle
9 July 2001	WHC Wezep/VSCO	A	8–0	2,200	Miller (3), Flo (2), Dodds, Nerlinger, Caniggia
15 July 2001	FC Copenhagen	A	1–1	10,484	Nerlinger
17 July 2001	Malmö	A	3–1	6,000	McCann, Caniggia, Flo
21 July 2001	Anderlecht	H	1–2	25,200	Caniggia

=== Scottish Premier League ===
Date	Opponent	Venue	Result	Attendance	Scorers
28 July 2001	Aberdeen	A	3–0	18,800	Nerlinger, Latapy (pen.), Caniggia
4 August 2001	Livingston	H	0–0	47,805	
11 August 2001	Dunfermline Athletic	A	4–1	10,902	Latapy, Flo, Konterman (2)
18 August 2001	Hibernian	H	2–2	45,940	Hughes, Flo
26 August 2001	Dundee	H	2–0	48,038	Mols, Ricksen
8 September 2001	Heart of Midlothian	A	2–2	14,014	Latapy, Flo
16 September 2001	Motherwell	H	3–0	41,137	Flo, de Boer, Caniggia
22 September 2001	Dundee United	A	6–1	11,117	Buchan (o.g.), Flo (3), de Boer, McCann
30 September 2001	Celtic	H	0–2	50,097	
13 October 2001	Kilmarnock	H	3–1	49,379	Arveladze, Caniggia, Flo
21 October 2001	St Johnstone	A	2–0	8,331	Arveladze, Flo
27 October 2001	Livingston	A	2–0	10,012	Reyna (2)
4 November 2001	Aberdeen	H	2–0	49,739	Flo (2)
17 November 2001	Dunfermline Athletic	H	4–0	48,554	Arveladze (2), Flo (2)
25 November 2001	Celtic	A	1–2	59,609	Løvenkrands
1 December 2001	Dundee	A	0–0	11,085	
9 December 2001	Heart of Midlothian	H	3–1	47,891	de Boer, Latapy, Arveladze
12 December 2001	Hibernian	H	1–1	46,179	Ricksen
15 December 2001	Motherwell	A	2–2	9,864	Arveladze, McCann
22 December 2001	Dundee United	H	3–2	47,315	Arveladze (2), Amoruso
26 December 2001	Hibernian	A	3–0	14,021	Moore, Flo, Arveladze
29 December 2001	St Johnstone	H	1–0	48,827	Mols
12 January 2002	Livingston	H	3–0	48,044	Flo, Caniggia (2)
19 January 2002	Aberdeen	A	1–0	17,846	Amoruso
23 January 2002	Dunfermline Athletic	A	4–2	8,795	Vidmar, de Boer (2), Arveladze (pen)
30 January 2002	Kilmarnock	A	2–2	11,589	de Boer, Flo
2 February 2002	Dundee	H	2–1	48,861	Arveladze, Moore
9 February 2002	Heart of Midlothian	A	2–0	14,128	de Boer, McCann
16 February 2002	Motherwell	H	3–0	49,284	Latapy, Flo, Ricksen
3 March 2002	Dundee United	A	1–0	9,386	Amoruso (pen.)
6 March 2002	St Johnstone	A	2–0	6,382	Flo, Ricksen
10 March 2002	Celtic	H	1–1	50,111	Numan
20 March 2002	Kilmarnock	H	5–0	40,768	McCann (3), Kanchelskis, Burke
7 April 2002	Heart of Midlothian	H	2–0	47,492	Dodds (2)
13 April 2002	Livingston	A	1–2	10,019	Amoruso
21 April 2002	Celtic	A	1–1	59,384	Løvenkrands
27 April 2002	Aberdeen	H	2–0	48,878	McCann, Ferguson
12 May 2002	Dunfermline Athletic	A	1–1	8,716	Moore

=== Scottish League Cup ===
Date	Round	Opponent	Venue	Result	Attendance	Scorers
9 October 2001	R3	Airdrieonians	H	3–0	34,075	Arveladze (2), Numan
28 November 2001	QF	Ross County	A	2–1	5,972	Arveladze, Reyna
5 February 2002	SF	Celtic	N	2–1	43,457	Løvenkrands, Konterman
17 March 2002	F	Ayr United	N	4–0	50,076	Flo, Ferguson (pen.), Caniggia (2)

=== Scottish Cup ===
Date	Round	Opponent	Venue	Result	Attendance	Scorers
15 January 2002	R3	Berwick Rangers	A	0–0	4,280	
21 January 2002	R3 R	Berwick Rangers	H	3–0	17,662	Amoruso, Konterman, Arveladze
26 January 2002	R4	Hibernian	H	4–1	25,636	Flo (2), Løvenkrands, Dodds
24 February 2002	QF	Forfar Athletic	A	6–0	4,504	Dodds (3), Arveladze (2), Kanchelskis
24 March 2002	SF	Partick Thistle	N	3–0	31,969	Nerlinger (2), Ferguson
4 May 2002	F	Celtic	N	3–2	51,138	Løvenkrands (2), Ferguson

=== UEFA Champions League ===
Date	Round	Opponent	Venue	Result	Attendance	Scorers
25 July 2001	QR2	(Slovenia) NK Maribor	A	3–0	6,100	Flo (2, 1 pen.), Nerlinger
1 August 2001	QR2	(Slovenia) NK Maribor	H	3–1	50,045	Flo, Caniggia (2)
8 August 2001	QR3	(Turkey) Fenerbahçe	H	0–0	49,472	
22 August 2001	QR3	(Turkey) Fenerbahçe	A	1–2	18,272	Ricksen

=== UEFA Cup ===
Date	Round	Opponent	Venue	Result	Attendance	Scorers
27 September 2001	R1	(Russia) Anzhi Makhachkala	N	1–0	4,200	Konterman
18 October 2001	R2	(Russia) Dynamo Moscow	H	3–1	45,008	Amoruso, Ball, de Boer
1 November 2001	R2	(Russia) Dynamo Moscow	A	4–1	6,000	de Boer, Ferguson, Flo, Løvenkrands
22 November 2001	R3	(France) Paris Saint-Germain	H	0–0	49,223	
6 December 2001	R3	(France) Paris Saint-Germain	A	0–0*	35,000	
21 February 2002	R4	(Netherlands) Feyenoord	H	1–1	49,041	Ferguson (pen.)
28 February 2002	R4	(Netherlands) Feyenoord	A	2–3	45,000	McCann, Ferguson (pen.)

*Rangers won the match 4–3 on penalties

== League table ==
Pos	Team	Pld	W	D	L	GF	GA	GD	Pts	Qualification or relegation (Note: Teams played each other three times (33 matches), before the league split into two groups (the top six and the bottom six) for the last five matches.)
1	Celtic (C)	38	33	4	1	94	18	+76	103	Qualification for the Champions League third qualifying round
2	Rangers	38	25	10	3	82	27	+55	85	Qualification for the UEFA Cup first round
3	Livingston	38	16	10	12	50	47	+3	58	Qualification for the UEFA Cup qualifying round (Note: As both finalists of the 2001–02 Scottish Cup, Rangers and Celtic, qualified for European competition via their league position, the cup berth for 2002–03 UEFA Cup was passed to the next-placed team in the league, fourth-placed Aberdeen.)
4	Aberdeen	38	16	7	15	51	49	+2	55	Qualification for the UEFA Cup qualifying round
5	Heart of Midlothian	38	14	6	18	52	57	−5	48	

Source: Scottish Professional Football League
Rules for classification: (1) Points; (2) Goal difference; (3) Goals scored
(C) Champions
