= 2001–02 in Scottish football =

Football in Scotland
- Season: 2001–02

2001–02 in Scottish football

Premier League champions
- Celtic

First Division champions
- Partick Thistle

Second Division champions
- Queen of the South

Third Division champions
- Brechin City

Scottish Cup winners
- Rangers

League Cup winners
- Rangers

Challenge Cup winners
- Airdrieonians

Junior Cup winners
- Linlithgow Rose

Teams in Europe
- Celtic, Hibernian, Kilmarnock, Rangers

Scotland national team
- 2002 World Cup qualification

The 2001–02 season was the 105th season of competitive football in Scotland.

== Key events ==
Celtic, domestic treble winners a year earlier, retain their Premier League title.

After failing to win anything the previous season, Rangers won the Scottish Cup and League Cup under their new manager Alex McLeish.

Airdrieonians, who narrowly missed out on promotion to the Premier League as First Division runners-up, went out of business of 1 May with debts of nearly £3million. Later that month, however, a new club representing the town of Airdrie - Airdrie United - was formed, with ambitions of gaining Scottish league status for the 2002–03 season.

Livingston, in the Premier League for the first time, finished third and qualified for the UEFA Cup. Livingston, who were known as Meadowbank Thistle until relocating from Edinburgh to Livingston in 1995 and played their first season in their new location as a Third Division club.

Falkirk avoided relegation from the First Division and Stenhousemuir avoided relegation from the Second as a result of the league losing a member. The vacant place in the Third Division was occupied by Gretna, who until then had played in the English non-league system.

Despite Gretna beating Airdrie United to the vacant league place, Airdrie United still gained a league place for the 2002–03 season – in the Second Division – as they bought out the debt-ridden club Clydebank.

Queen of the South won the Second Division league title for the first time in 51-years since they won the Division B league title in season 1950–51. These were the only two occasions that the Dumfries club had won a league title in their history, that was up until they won their third ever league title in season 2012–13, when they won the Second Division once again.

== League Competitions ==
=== Scottish Premier League ===
The 2001–02 Scottish Premier League was won by Celtic. Rangers finished second and therefore qualified for a UEFA Champions League place alongside Celtic. Livingston, in their debut season in Scotland's top division, qualified for the UEFA Cup along with Aberdeen. St Johnstone were relegated to the First Division.

Pos	Team	Pld	W	D	L	GF	GA	GD	Pts	Qualification or relegation (Note: Teams played each other three times (33 matches), before the league split into two groups (the top six and the bottom six) for the last five matches.)
1	Celtic (C)	38	33	4	1	94	18	+76	103	Qualification for the Champions League third qualifying round
2	Rangers	38	25	10	3	82	27	+55	85	Qualification for the UEFA Cup first round
3	Livingston	38	16	10	12	50	47	+3	58	Qualification for the UEFA Cup qualifying round (Note: As both finalists of the 2001–02 Scottish Cup, Rangers and Celtic, qualified for European competition via their league position, the cup berth for 2002–03 UEFA Cup was passed to the next-placed team in the league, fourth-placed Aberdeen.)
4	Aberdeen	38	16	7	15	51	49	+2	55	Qualification for the UEFA Cup qualifying round
5	Heart of Midlothian	38	14	6	18	52	57	−5	48	
6	Dunfermline Athletic	38	12	9	17	41	64	−23	45	
7	Kilmarnock	38	13	10	15	44	54	−10	49	
8	Dundee United	38	12	10	16	38	59	−21	46	
9	Dundee	38	12	8	18	41	55	−14	44	
10	Hibernian	38	10	11	17	51	56	−5	41	
11	Motherwell	38	11	7	20	49	69	−20	40	
12	St Johnstone (R)	38	5	6	27	24	62	−38	21	Relegation to the First Division

Source: Scottish Professional Football League
Rules for classification: (1) Points; (2) Goal difference; (3) Goals scored
(C) Champions; (R) Relegated

=== Scottish First Division ===
Pos	Team	Pld	W	D	L	GF	GA	GD	Pts	Promotion or relegation
1	Partick Thistle (C, P)	36	19	9	8	61	38	+23	66	Promotion to the Premier League
2	Airdrieonians (R)	36	15	11	10	59	40	+19	56	Club folded after the season
3	Ayr United	36	13	13	10	53	44	+9	52	
4	Ross County	36	14	10	12	51	43	+8	52	
5	Clyde	36	13	10	13	51	56	−5	49	
6	Inverness CT	36	13	9	14	60	51	+9	48	
7	Arbroath	36	14	6	16	42	59	−17	48	
8	St Mirren	36	11	12	13	43	53	−10	45	
9	Falkirk (Note: Falkirk were reprieved from relegation due to Airdrieonians folding.)	36	10	9	17	49	73	−24	39	
10	Raith Rovers (R)	36	8	11	17	50	62	−12	35	Relegation to the Second Division

Source: "2001-2002 First Division - SPFL Archive". SPFL.
Rules for classification: 1) points; 2) goal difference; 3) number of goals scored.
(C) Champions; (P) Promoted; (R) Relegated

=== Scottish Second Division ===
Pos	Team	Pld	W	D	L	GF	GA	GD	Pts	Promotion or relegation
1	Queen of the South (C, P)	36	20	7	9	64	42	+22	67	Promotion to the First Division
2	Alloa Athletic (P)	36	15	14	7	55	33	+22	59	Promotion to the First Division
3	Forfar Athletic	36	15	8	13	51	47	+4	53	
4	Clydebank (Note: Clydebank folded at the end of the season; their place in the Scottish Football League was subsequently purchased by Airdrie United for the following season.)	36	14	9	13	44	45	−1	51	Club folded after the season
5	Hamilton Academical	36	13	9	14	49	44	+5	48	
6	Berwick Rangers	36	12	11	13	44	52	−8	47	
7	Stranraer	36	10	15	11	48	51	−3	45	
8	Cowdenbeath	36	11	11	14	49	51	−2	44	
9	Stenhousemuir (Note: Stenhousemuir were reprieved from relegation due to Aidrieonians folding.)	36	8	12	16	33	57	−24	36	
10	Greenock Morton (R)	36	7	14	15	48	63	−15	35	Relegation to the Third Division

Source: "2001-2002 Second Division - SPFL Archive". SPFL.
Rules for classification: 1) points; 2) goal difference; 3) number of goals scored.
(C) Champions; (P) Promoted; (R) Relegated

=== Scottish Third Division ===
Pos	Team	Pld	W	D	L	GF	GA	GD	Pts	Promotion
1	Brechin City (C, P)	36	22	7	7	67	38	+29	73	Promotion to the Second Division
2	Dumbarton (P)	36	18	7	11	59	48	+11	61	Promotion to the Second Division
3	Albion Rovers	36	16	11	9	51	32	+19	59	
4	Peterhead	36	17	5	14	63	52	+11	56	
5	Montrose	36	16	7	13	43	39	+4	55	
6	Elgin City	36	13	8	15	45	47	−2	47	
7	East Stirlingshire	36	12	4	20	51	58	−7	40	
8	East Fife	36	11	7	18	39	56	−17	40	
9	Stirling Albion	36	9	10	17	45	68	−23	37	
10	Queen's Park	36	9	8	19	38	53	−15	35	

Source: "2001-2002 Third Division - SPFL Archive". SPFL.
Rules for classification: 1) points; 2) goal difference; 3) number of goals scored.
(C) Champions; (P) Promoted

== Other honours ==
=== Cup honours ===
Competition	Winner	Score	Runner-up	Report
Scottish Cup 2001–02	Rangers	3 – 2	Celtic	Wikipedia article
League Cup 2001–02	Rangers	4 – 0	Ayr United	Wikipedia article
Challenge Cup 2001–02	Airdrieonians	2 – 1	Alloa Athletic	Wikipedia article
Youth Cup	Rangers	4 – 2	Ayr United	
Junior Cup	Linlithgow Rose	1 – 0	Auchinleck Talbot	

=== Individual honours ===
==== SPFA awards ====
Award	Player	Team
Players' Player of the Year	(Italy) Lorenzo Amoruso	Rangers
Young Player of the Year	(Scotland) Kevin McNaughton	Aberdeen

==== SFWA awards ====
Award	Player	Team
Footballer of the Year	(Scotland) Paul Lambert	Celtic
Young Player of the Year	(Scotland) James McFadden	Motherwell
Manager of the Year	(Northern Ireland) Martin O'Neill	Celtic

== Scottish clubs in Europe ==
Club	Competition(s)	Final round	Coef.
Celtic	UEFA Champions League; UEFA Cup	Group stage Third round	10.00
Rangers	UEFA Champions League; UEFA Cup	Third qualifying round Fourth round	11.50
Kilmarnock	UEFA Cup	First round	3.00
Hibernian	UEFA Cup	First round	2.00

Average coefficient - 6.625

== Scotland national team ==
Date	Venue	Opponents	Score (Note: Scotland's score is shown first.)	Competition	Scotland scorer(s)	Report
1 September	Hampden Park, Glasgow (H)	Croatia	0–0	WCQG6		BBC Sport
5 September	Stade Roi Baudouin, Brussels (A)	Belgium	0–2	WCQG6		BBC Sport
6 October	Hampden Park, Glasgow (H)	Latvia	2–1	WCQG6	Dougie Freedman, David Weir	BBC Sport
27 March	Stade de France, Saint-Denis (A)	France	0–5	Friendly		BBC Sport
17 April	Pittodrie, Aberdeen (H)	Nigeria	1–2	Friendly	Christian Dailly	BBC Sport
16 May	Asiad Main Stadium, Busan (A)	South Korea	1–4	Friendly	Scott Dobie	BBC Sport
20 May	Mongkok Stadium, Hong Kong (N)	South Africa	0–2	Friendly		BBC Sport

Key:

- (H) = Home match
- (A) = Away match
- WCQG6 = World Cup Qualifying - Group 6

== See also ==
- 2001–02 Aberdeen F.C. season
- 2001–02 Celtic F.C. season
- 2001–02 Dundee United F.C. season
- 2001–02 Rangers F.C. season
