= 2003 Scottish League Cup final =

- Event: 2002–03 Scottish League Cup
Celtic	Rangers
1	2
- Date: 16 March 2003
- Venue: Hampden Park, Glasgow
- Referee: Kenny Clark
- Attendance: 52,000

The 2003 Scottish League Cup final was played on 16 March 2003 at Hampden Park in Glasgow and was the final of the 56th Scottish League Cup. The final was contested by Celtic and Rangers. Rangers won the match 2–1, thanks to goals from Claudio Caniggia and Peter Løvenkrands. John Hartson missed a penalty kick late in the game that would potentially have taken the match into extra time.

== Match details ==
16 March 2003

Celtic	1–2	Rangers
Larsson 57'	Report	Caniggia 23'; Løvenkrands 35'

Hampden Park, Glasgow
Attendance: 52,000
Referee: Kenny Clark

Celtic	Rangers

CELTIC :
GK	20	(Scotland) Robert Douglas
CB	35	(Sweden) Johan Mjällby	(substituted off) 88'
CB	6	(Guinea) Bobo Baldé
CB	5	(Belgium) Joos Valgaeren
RM	39	(Scotland) Jamie Smith	(substituted off) 66'
CM	18	(Northern Ireland) Neil Lennon	(red card) 88'
CM	14	(Scotland) Paul Lambert (c)
CM	9	(England) Chris Sutton	(substituted off) 80'
LM	8	(England) Alan Thompson
CF	7	(Sweden) Henrik Larsson
CF	10	(Wales) John Hartson
Substitutes:
GK	22	(Scotland) David Marshall
DF	4	(Scotland) Jackie McNamara
MF	19	(Bulgaria) Stiliyan Petrov	(substituted in) 88'
MF	3	(Guinea) Momo Sylla	(substituted in) 66'
FW	29	(Scotland) Shaun Maloney	(substituted in) 80'
Manager:
(Northern Ireland) Martin O'Neill

RANGERS :
GK	1	(Germany) Stefan Klos
RB	2	(Netherlands) Fernando Ricksen
CB	4	(Italy) Lorenzo Amoruso
CB	3	(Australia) Craig Moore
LB	5	(France) Jérôme Bonnissel	(substituted off) 64'
RM	7	(Argentina) Claudio Caniggia
CM	6	(Scotland) Barry Ferguson (c)
CM	8	(Spain) Mikel Arteta	(substituted off) 78'
LM	11	(Denmark) Peter Løvenkrands
CF	9	(Netherlands) Ronald de Boer	(substituted off) 86'
CF	10	(Netherlands) Michael Mols
Substitutes:
GK	17	(Scotland) Allan McGregor
DF	15	(Scotland) Maurice Ross	(substituted in) 64'
DF	12	(Netherlands) Bert Konterman	(substituted in) 78'
MF	16	(Scotland) Neil McCann
FW	14	(Georgia (country)) Shota Arveladze	(substituted in) 86'
Manager:
(Scotland) Alex McLeish
