= Løvenkrands =

Løvenkrands is a Danish surname. Notable people with the surname include:

- Peter Løvenkrands (born 1980), Danish footballer and manager
- Tommy Løvenkrands (born 1974), Danish footballer
