= Shota Arveladze =

Georgian football manager (born 1973)

Shota Arveladze შოთა არველაძე
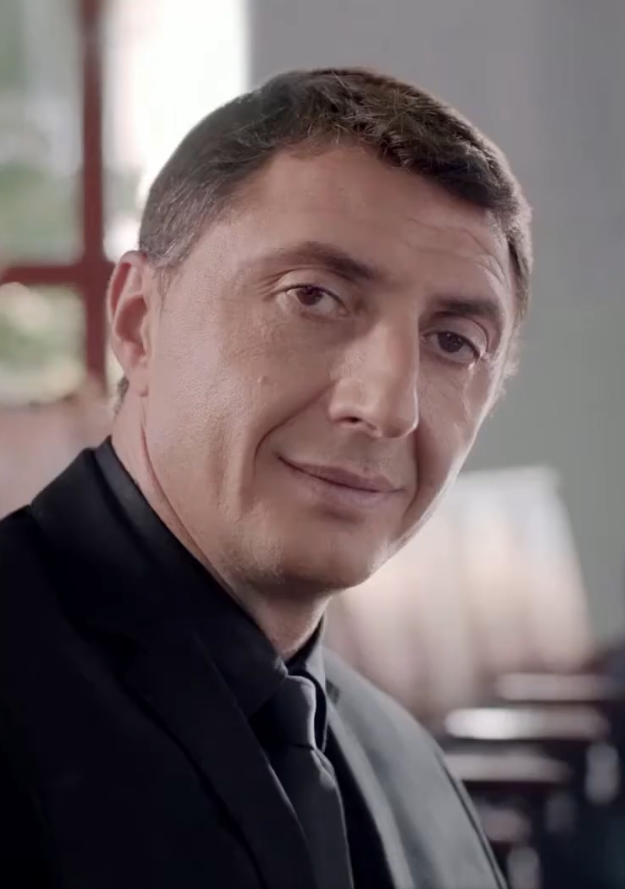
- Arveladze in 2018

Personal information
- Date of birth: 22 February 1973 (age 53)
- Place of birth: Tbilisi, Georgian SSR, Soviet Union
- Height: 1.82 m (6 ft 0 in)
- Position: Striker

Youth career
- 1987–1990: Dinamo Tbilisi

Senior career*
Years	Team	Apps	(Gls)
1990–1991	Martve Tbilisi	30	(33)
1991–1994	Dinamo Tbilisi	67	(51)
1993–1994	→ Trabzonspor (loan)	18	(15)
1995–1997	Trabzonspor	76	(46)
1997–2001	Ajax	96	(55)
2001–2005	Rangers	95	(44)
2005–2007	AZ	60	(36)
2007–2008	Levante	4	(0)
Total		426	(258)

International career
1992–2007	Georgia	61	(26)

Managerial career
- 2010–2012: Kayserispor
- 2012–2015: Kasımpaşa
- 2015: Trabzonspor
- 2016–2017: Maccabi Tel Aviv
- 2017–2020: Pakhtakor Tashkent
- 2022: Hull City
- 2023–2024: Fatih Karagümrük
- 2025: Kasımpaşa
- * Club domestic league appearances and goals

Shota Arveladze (Georgian: შოთა არველაძე; born 22 February 1973) is a Georgian professional football manager and former player who most recently coached Turkish club Kasımpaşa.

Arveladze played at Dinamo Tbilisi, Trabzonspor, Ajax, Rangers, AZ and Levante. He is Georgia's all-time top scorer with 291 goals in his 410 league games for his clubs and 26 goals in his 61 games for the national team.

His 27 goals scored in the UEFA Cup competition, including qualifiers ranks him third in the tournament's history before it became the Europa League. He has the best strike record of independent Georgian Football. He was nominated as the best player of Georgia as well as the best player by the Georgian Professional Football league survey.

== Club career ==
=== Tbilisi and Trabzonspor ===
Arveladze played at Dinamo Tbilisi, Trabzonspor, and Ajax, and finished at least one season as the top goal scorer at all three. In 1993, he scored an effective first Euro Tournament goal in the history of independent Georgian Football in the match against Linfield, Northern Ireland. When he led Trabzonspor in goals in 1995–96, he also led the Süper Lig, making him the second non-Turk to date to lead that league in goals after Tarik Hodžić 1983–84. He is recorded as "most loved foreign player" for Trabzonspor supporters.

=== Ajax ===
In summer 1997, Arveladze signed for Ajax. Later, he declared that he was so nervous during his first training session, that he even forgot to take football boots with him. He became a close friend to Ronald de Boer during his spell in Amsterdam. His first game at the Amsterdam Arena was a special day for the Georgian player. On 15 August 1997, Ajax faced Brazilian side Grêmio in a friendly game. Arveladze scored a goal, while his wife Tamuna gave birth to their first child, Giorgi hours before the game.

Arveladze made a debut for Ajax against Vitesse, where he replaced Gerald Sibon and scored the fourth goal for the club. During his first season, he scored three hat-tricks in Eredivisie and total 25 goals in 31 appearances. The manager of the Amsterdam-based club Morten Olsen was very pleased with the performance of the young striker. Arveladze was a key figure for the club during 1997–98 UEFA Cup as well. He scored seven goals in eight games for the club, including hat-trick against NK Maribor. Ajax were eliminated in quarter-finals, against Spartak Moscow. Arveladze scored the club's single goal in a tie. During his first season, he faced twice NAC Breda, where his twin brother Archil played. This remains as one of the most memorable facts in Shota's career.

In summer 1998, Ajax signed Arveladze's close friend Giorgi Kinkladze from Manchester City for £5 million. They had been friends since their childhood and that looked like a dream move for both. However, Kinkladze's spell at Ajax proved unsuccessful.

=== Rangers ===
Arveladze joined Rangers from Ajax for £3 million in 2001. He agreed a four-year deal with the club. It was obvious that the Georgian would face a fierce competitions for the starting place in the Rangers' strike force from the players like Tore Andre Flo, Claudio Caniggia, Michael Mols, Kenny Miller, Billy Dodds, Ronald de Boer and Russell Latapy.

During the first season with Glasgow-based club, Arveladze scored 17 goals overall, including 11 in Scottish Premier League. He only managed to take part in 30 games, after being injured in February in the quarterfinal of the Scottish Cup against Forfar Athletic, an injury which meant he missed the 2002 Scottish League Cup Final. However, he scored six goals for his club, which managed to win the title. Arveladze played in the final, replacing Claudio Caniggia. This was his first title with the Scottish club.

The following season was the most successful in the career of the Georgian player. Rangers won treble. In March 2003, Rangers defeated their arch-rivals Celtic in the League Cup Final. Later in the Scottish Cup Final, Rangers won another title, after they managed to defeat Dundee with a goal from Lorenzo Amoruso. Arveladze's two compatriots Georgi Nemsadze and Zurab Khizanishvili also took part in this game. The latter joined Arveladze at Rangers during that summer.

In May 2005, Arveladze declared that he would leave the club after the end of the season, in which he managed to score 9 goals. He confirmed receiving offers from various clubs in Europe, including teams from England, Germany, the Netherlands and Turkey.

During his time at Rangers, Arveladze had a nickname, Mr. Bean, because of his facial likeness to Rowan Atkinson.

During a legal case in 2015, Arveladze's agent claimed that the true transfer fee had been 12 million Euro, the equivalent of £8.5 million at the time. Arveladze scored the 300th goal in the SPL and was part of Rangers squads that won the domestic treble in 2002–03 and a double in 2004–05.

=== AZ ===
Arveladze departed Rangers for Dutch side AZ on a free transfer before the start of 2005–06 season, signing a two-year deal with the club.

Under the guidance of Louis van Gaal, Arveladze became the key figure of the club. He scored 22 goals in Eredivisie, becoming the second best top-scorer of the league after Klaas-Jan Huntelaar, who scored 33 goals during the season. Alkmaar participated in UEFA Cup this time as well. In 6 games for the club, Arveladze made 2 assists and scored 2 goals, one of them against Real Betis. At the end of the season, AZ Alkmaar and Arveladze agreed a contract extension to keep the Georgian international striker at the Dutch club until the summer of 2008.

During the second and the final season with the club, Arveladze was appointed as the new captain of the club. He was offered the armband after Denny Landzaat and Joris Mathijsen left for Wigan Athletic and Hamburger SV respectively. The Georgian was praised by Louis van Gaal, under whose guidance he played at Ajax as well. Van Gaal compared Arveladze to Danny Blind and Frank Rijkaard in terms of personality, calling him "the top professional in the squad".

He scored 23 goals, accumulating total 48 goals for AZ in 89 competitive appearances. The Georgian striker scored seven goals in UEFA Cup as well, two of them at the Ramón Sánchez Pizjuán Stadium in a 2–1 away win against Sevilla.

=== Levante ===
In July 2007, Arveladze passed a medical and agreed a one-year contract with the Spanish club Levante. He was injured in summer training and missed nearly ten months, undergoing surgery in Amsterdam. He returned and made his debut against Villarreal on 23 March, replacing Juanma. He managed to take part in other 3 games until the end of the season.

In April, Levante confirmed that Arveladze would retire at the end of the season. In the last game of his career he played at the Santiago Bernabeu against Real Madrid, losing 5–2.

== International career ==
Shota Arveladze was a regular in the Georgian national team and is its all-time leading scorer with 26 goals in his 61 games. 16 of these 26 goals came in European Championship qualifiers.

He made his international debut in Georgia's first official game on 2 September 1992, a 1–0 friendly loss away to Lithuania. Fifteen days later, he scored his first goal in the country's first home game, a 6–3 win over neighbours Azerbaijan. His first competitive goal was on 16 November, in a 5–0 win over Wales in Tbilisi for UEFA Euro 1996 qualifying.

On 30 March 1997, Arveladze scored a hat-trick in a 7–0 home friendly win against neighbours Armenia. With Georgia he won in 1998 the Malta International Football Tournament. On 18 August 2006, he scored a hat-trick away to the Faroe Islands in a 6–0 win in the opening game of UEFA Euro 2008 qualifying. His final game was the following 24 March in another qualifier, equalising in a 2–1 loss away to Scotland.

== Coaching career ==
After retiring as a player, Arveladze was appointed as assistant manager of AZ under head coach and former Ajax coach Louis van Gaal in July 2008. He maintained this position in the 2009–10 season under Ronald Koeman and Dick Advocaat.

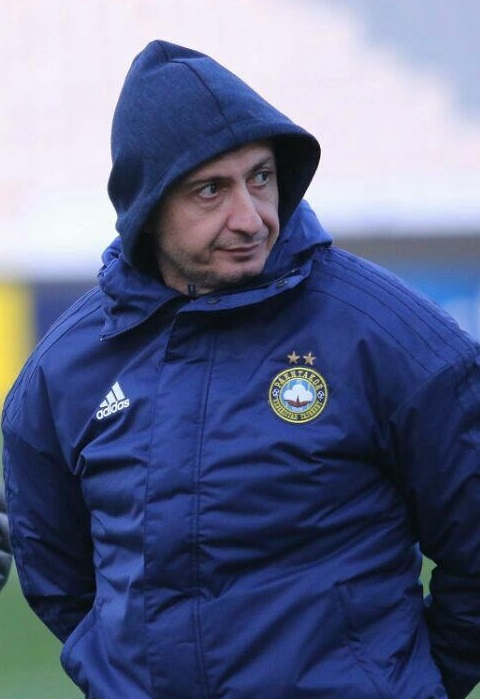
Arveladze as manager of Pakhtakor in 2019

For the 2010–11 season, Arveladze served as manager of Turkish side Kayserispor. From 2012 to 2015, he managed Istanbul-based Kasımpaşa. In his final game, the team scored away to Konyaspor while their players were attending to his injured player, Ryan Babel. Arveladze then allowed Konyaspor to score an equaliser in the name of fair play, and Konyaspor won the game 2–1. He resigned after the game.

On 3 July 2015, Arveladze was named as manager of Turkish side Trabzonspor. He resigned in November. Under him and his successor Hami Mandıralı, the side lost a record 17 games that season.

In June 2016, Arveladze was announced as the new head coach of Israeli club Maccabi Tel Aviv Around the middle of the season, he was fired; it was the first time that Maccabi had dismissed a coach during a season since 2011.

In 2017, Arveladze was announced as head coach of Pakhtakor Tashkent in Uzbekistan. He won the Uzbekistan Super League and Cup in 2019 and 2020. On 21 December 2020, he left.

On 27 January 2022, Arveladze was announced as the new head coach of Hull City on a 2 1/2-year deal. On his debut two days later, the team won 2–0 at home to Swansea City. Arveladze was dismissed by Hull City on 30 September 2022, with the team 20th in the EFL Championship after four consecutive defeats.

On 11 December 2023, it was announced that a deal was agreed in principle for him to become the head coach of Fatih Karagümrük.

== Personal life ==
Arveladze's brothers Archil (twin) and Revaz (older) also played international football, as did Revaz's son Vato.

== Career statistics ==
=== Club ===
Appearances and goals by club, season and competition
Club	Season	League			Cup (Note: Includes Georgian Cup, Turkish Cup, KNVB Cup, Scottish Cup, Scottish League Cup and Copa del Rey)		Europe		Total	
Club	Season	Division	Apps	Goals	Apps	Goals	Apps	Goals	Apps	Goals
Dinamo Tbilisi	1990–91	Umaglesi Liga	7	3	0	0	—		7	3
Dinamo Tbilisi	1991–92	Umaglesi Liga	30	22	0	0	—		30	22
Dinamo Tbilisi	1992–93	Umaglesi Liga	23	18	0	0	—		23	18
Dinamo Tbilisi	1993–94	Umaglesi Liga	7	8	0	0	2	1	9	9
Dinamo Tbilisi	1994–95	Umaglesi Liga	8	11	0	0	—		8	11
Dinamo Tbilisi	Total		75	62	0	0	2	1	77	63
Trabzonspor	1993–94	1.Lig	18	15	4	4	—		22	19
Trabzonspor	1994–95	1.Lig	17	12	6	6	—		23	18
Trabzonspor	1995–96	1.Lig	34	25	3	2	4	1	41	28
Trabzonspor	1996–97	1.Lig	27	9	6	3	4	4	37	16
Trabzonspor	Total		96	61	19	15	8	5	123	81
Ajax	1997–98	Eredivisie	31	25	5	5	8	7	44	37
Ajax	1998–99	Eredivisie	19	7	3	1	3	0	25	8
Ajax	1999–2000	Eredivisie	17	5	1	0	2	1	20	6
Ajax	2000–01	Eredivisie	27	18	1	0	3	2	31	20
Ajax	2001–02	Eredivisie	2	0	0	0	2	1	4	1
Ajax	Total		96	55	10	6	18	11	124	72
Rangers	2001–02	Scottish Premier League	22	11	8	6	—		30	17
Rangers	2002–03	Scottish Premier League	30	15	8	1	2	0	40	16
Rangers	2003–04	Scottish Premier League	19	12	4	2	6	1	29	15
Rangers	2004–05	Scottish Premier League	24	6	2	1	7	2	33	9
Rangers	Total		95	44	22	10	15	3	132	57
AZ	2005–06	Eredivisie	31	22	5	1	6	2	42	25
AZ	2006–07	Eredivisie	29	14	7	2	11	7	47	23
AZ	Total		60	36	12	3	17	9	89	48
Levante	2007–08	La Liga	4	0	0	0	—		4	0
Career total			426	258	63	34	60	29	549	321

=== International ===
Appearances and goals by national team and year
National team	Year	Apps	Goals
Georgia	1992	2	1
Georgia	1994	6	3
Georgia	1995	6	2
Georgia	1996	5	0
Georgia	1997	6	5
Georgia	1998	5	0
Georgia	1999	3	3
Georgia	2000	3	0
Georgia	2001	6	1
Georgia	2002	2	1
Georgia	2003	4	3
Georgia	2004	4	0
Georgia	2005	3	1
Georgia	2006	5	5
Georgia	2007	1	1
Total		61	26

Scores and results list Georgia's goal tally first, score column indicates score after each Arveladze goal.

List of international goals scored by Shota Arveladze
No.	Date	Venue	Opponent	Score	Result	Competition
1	17 September 1992	David Kipiani Stadium, Gurjaani, Georgia	Azerbaijan	4–1	6–3	Friendly
2	19 July 1992	Boris Paichadze Stadium, Tbilisi, Georgia	Malta	1–1	1–1	Friendly
3	16 November 1994	Boris Paichadze Stadium, Tbilisi, Georgia	Wales	5–0	5–0	UEFA Euro 1996 qualifier
4	16 November 1994	Qemal Stafa Stadium, Tirana, Albania	Albania	1–0	1–0	UEFA Euro 1996 qualifier
5	26 April 1995	Boris Paichadze Stadium, Tbilisi, Georgia	Albania	1–0	2–0	UEFA Euro 1996 qualifier
6	11 October 1995	Boris Paichadze Stadium, Tbilisi, Georgia	Bulgaria	1–0	2–1	UEFA Euro 1996 qualifier
7.	30 March 1997	Boris Paichadze Stadium, Tbilisi, Georgia	Armenia	1–0	7–0	Friendly
8	30 March 1997	Boris Paichadze Stadium, Tbilisi, Georgia	Armenia	3–0	7–0	Friendly
9	30 March 1997	Boris Paichadze Stadium, Tbilisi, Georgia	Armenia	6–0	7–0	Friendly
10	7 June 1997	Central Stadium, Batumi, Georgia	Moldova	1–0	2–0	1998 FIFA World Cup qualifier
11	14 June 1997	Stadion GKS Katowice, Katowice, Poland	Poland	1–0	1–4	1998 FIFA World Cup qualifier
12	4 September 1999	Bežigrad Stadium, Ljubljana, Slovenia	Slovenia	1–1	1–2	UEFA Euro 2000 qualifier
13	8 September 1999	Boris Paichadze Stadium, Tbilisi, Georgia	Latvia	1–0	2–2	UEFA Euro 2000 qualifier
14	9 October 1999	Qemal Stafa Stadium, Tirana, Albania	Albania	1–2	1–2	UEFA Euro 2000 qualifier
15	1 September 2001	Mikheil Meskhi Stadium, Tbilisi, Georgia	Hungary	1–0	3–1	2002 FIFA World Cup qualifier
16	8 September 2002	St. Jakob Park, Basel, Switzerland	Switzerland	1–1	1–4	UEFA Euro 2004 qualifier
17	6 September 2003	Boris Paichadze Stadium, Tbilisi, Georgia	Albania	1–0	3–0	UEFA Euro 2004 qualifier
18	6 September 2003	Boris Paichadze Stadium, Tbilisi, Georgia	Albania	3–0	3–0	UEFA Euro 2004 qualifier
19	11 September 2003	Qemal Stafa Stadium, Tirana, Albania	Albania	1–1	1–2	UEFA Euro 2004 qualifier
20	27 May 2005	Sportzentrum, Altenkirchen, Germany	New Zealand	1–2	1–3	Friendly
21	18 August 2006	Svangaskarð, Toftir, Iceland	Faroe Islands	3–0	6–0	UEFA Euro 2008 qualifier
22	18 August 2006	Svangaskarð, Toftir, Iceland	Faroe Islands	5–0	6–0	UEFA Euro 2008 qualifier
23	18 August 2006	Svangaskarð, Toftir, Iceland	Faroe Islands	6–0	6–0	UEFA Euro 2008 qualifier
24	6 September 2006	Olimpiyskiy National Sports Complex, Kyiv, Ukraine	Ukraine	1–1	2–3	UEFA Euro 2008 qualifier
25	16 November 2006	Mikheil Meskhi Stadium, Tbilisi, Georgia	Jordan	3–2	3–2	Friendly
26	24 March 2007	Hampden Park, Glasgow, Scotland	Scotland	1–1	1–2	UEFA Euro 2008 qualifier

=== Managerial statistics ===
As of 29 November 2025

Managerial record by team and tenure
Team	From	To	Record							
Team	From	To	G	W	D	L	GF	GA	GD	Win %
Kayserispor	29 June 2010	3 October 2012	86	33	16	37	109	117	−8	38.37
Kasımpaşa	8 October 2012	13 March 2015	91	33	28	30	144	126	+18	36.26
Trabzonspor	3 July 2015	11 November 2015	15	6	3	6	18	18	+0	40.00
Maccabi Tel Aviv	16 June 2016	4 January 2017	30	16	7	7	52	33	+19	53.33
Pakhtakor	23 June 2017	21 December 2020	124	90	18	16	289	90	+199	72.58
Hull City	27 January 2022	30 September 2022	30	9	6	15	30	46	−16	30.00
Fatih Karagümrük	11 December 2023	9 March 2024	17	6	4	7	21	24	−3	35.29
Kasımpaşa	1 July 2025	4 December 2025	13	3	4	6	13	19	−6	23.08
Career totals			406	196	85	125	676	473	+203	48.28

== Honours ==
=== Player ===
Dinamo Tbilisi

- Umaglesi Liga: 1990–91, 1991–92, 1992–93, 1993–94
- Georgian Cup: 1990–91, 1991–92, 1992–93, 1993–94

Trabzonspor

- Turkish Cup: 1994–95
- Turkish Super Cup: 1995
- Prime Minister's Cup: 1994, 1996

Ajax

- Eredivisie: 1997–98
- KNVB Cup: 1997–98, 1998–99

Rangers

- Scottish Premier League: 2002–03, 2004–05
- Scottish Cup: 2001–02, 2002–03
- Scottish League Cup: 2002–03

Individual

- CIS Cup top goalscorer: 1993
- Turkish Footballer of the Year: 1994
- Georgian Footballer of the Year: 1994, 1998, 2007
- Turkish Cup top scorer: 1994–95
- Süper Lig top scorer: 1995–96
- SPL Player of the Month: September 2003

=== Manager ===
Pakhtakor Tashkent

- Uzbekistan Super League: 2019, 2020
- Uzbekistan Cup: 2019, 2020
- Uzbekistan League Cup: 2019

== See also ==
- List of Süper Lig top scorers
