= Barry Ferguson =

Scottish footballer (born 1978)

Barry Ferguson MBE
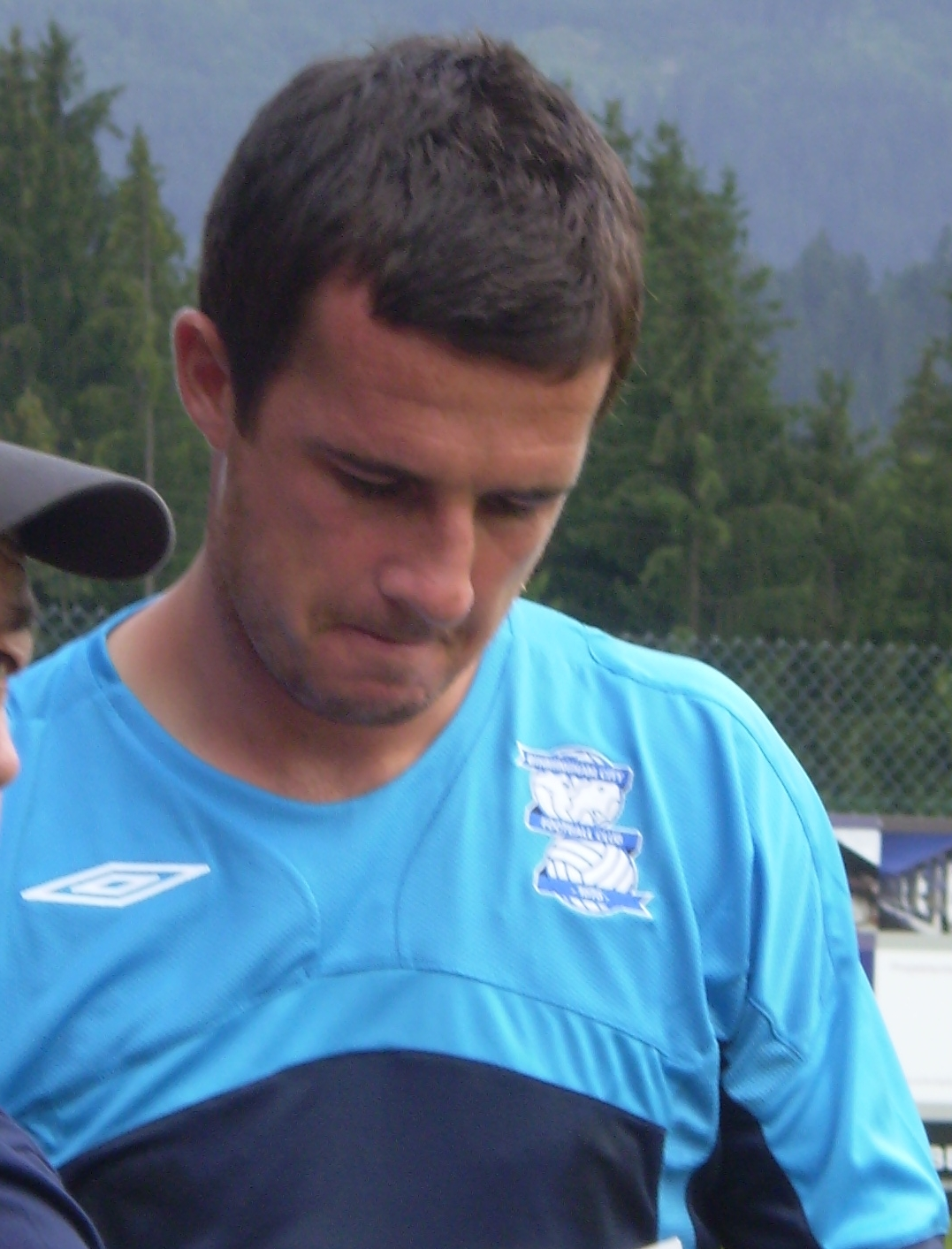
- Ferguson in 2009

Personal information
- Date of birth: 2 February 1978 (age 48)
- Place of birth: Hamilton, Scotland
- Height: 5 ft 10 in (1.78 m)
- Position: Midfielder

Youth career
- Rangers SABC
- 1994–1997: Rangers

Senior career*
Years	Team	Apps	(Gls)
1997–2003	Rangers	151	(24)
2003–2005	Blackburn Rovers	36	(3)
2005–2009	Rangers	137	(20)
2009–2011	Birmingham City	72	(0)
2011–2014	Blackpool	80	(1)
2012	→ Fleetwood Town (loan)	6	(0)
2014–2015	Clyde	1	(0)
Total		484	(48)

International career
1997–1998	Scotland U21	12	(1)
1998–2009	Scotland	45	(3)

Managerial career
- 2014: Blackpool (caretaker)
- 2014–2017: Clyde
- 2018–2021: Kelty Hearts
- 2021–2022: Alloa Athletic
- 2025: Rangers (interim)
- * Club domestic league appearances and goals

Barry Ferguson (born 2 February 1978) is a Scottish football coach, former player and pundit who was most recently interim head coach of Scottish Premiership club Rangers.

Ferguson spent most of his playing career at Rangers, in two spells either side of a £7.5 million transfer to English club Blackburn Rovers. He totalled 431 games and 60 goals for Rangers, whom he captained between 2000 and 2003 and again between 2005 and 2009. Ferguson won the Scottish Premier League, Scottish Cup and Scottish League Cup five times apiece for Rangers, including a treble in 2003, which earned him the honour of SFWA Footballer of the Year. He also helped Rangers to reach the 2008 UEFA Cup final.

Ferguson made 45 appearances for the Scotland national team, starting from 1998. In 2009, following behavioural incidents while on national duty, he was stripped of the captaincy of Rangers and told he would no longer be considered for international selection.

Later in his career, he returned to England with Birmingham City, Blackpool and Fleetwood Town. Towards the end of his playing spell with Blackpool, he served as caretaker manager of the club. Ferguson was appointed player-manager of Clyde in June 2014; he resigned from this position in February 2017. He became manager of Kelty Hearts in October 2018, and he left them in May 2021 after guiding them to promotion to the SPFL for the first time. Ferguson then became manager of Alloa Athletic soon after, but left the club on 14 February after a run of one win in eleven games. In February 2025, he was appointed interim head coach of Rangers.

== Early life ==
Born in Hamilton into a Rangers-supporting family, Ferguson's older brother Derek played for the club in the same midfield position in the 1980s, with the younger sibling often being invited behind the scenes at Ibrox Stadium as a child.

Around the age of 8 he began playing for Mill United in Hamilton. In his early teens, although highly rated, he made it into the last thirty or so candidates for the Scotland Schoolboys squad at trials in Largs only to be rejected due to his 5 feet 5 inches (1.65 m) stature.

Having trained with Rangers since 1991, Ferguson signed a professional contract upon finishing his education at Brannock High School in 1994. Aside from his brother, Ferguson's idol was Ian Durrant, who was still an important player when he joined the club.

== Playing career ==
=== Club ===
==== Rangers (first spell) ====
Ferguson was promoted to the first-team squad for the 1996–97 season. He made his debut on the last day of that season against Hearts on 10 May 1997. He made a number of sporadic appearances the following season under manager Walter Smith's policy of easing him into the first team.

Ferguson became a regular fixture in the first team during the 1998–99 season under new manager Dick Advocaat (displacing fellow youth graduate Charlie Miller). The Dutchman soon secured Ferguson on a long-term contract as he became an important member of the squad. He scored his first career goal in a League Cup match against Alloa Athletic on 18 August 1998, and played against his brother on three occasions during that season when Rangers faced Dunfermline Athletic, with a 20-year-old Ferguson scoring his first league goal in the match at East End Park. His brother, then 31 years old, made his last appearance at Ibrox in the reverse fixture. Injury prevented him from being involved in the 1998–99 season run-in as the club achieved the treble; Ferguson watched the 1999 Scottish Cup final from the stands as Rangers won by a single goal, scored by Rod Wallace three minutes into the second half.

Ferguson was so influential the following season that he was given an extended six-year deal at Rangers in October 1999. He was named the Scottish Football Writers' Association Footballer of the Year for 1999–2000, a season in which Rangers retained the Premier League and Scottish Cup, beating Aberdeen in the final.

Ferguson received minor facial injuries after engaging in a drunken hotel brawl following a 6–2 defeat to Celtic in August 2000. After being sent off in the match, he had made obscene gestures to the crowd and then went drinking in Bothwell in his club tracksuit. When the club crashed out of the UEFA Champions League group stage at the hands of AS Monaco, largely because of a mistake by captain Lorenzo Amoruso, the Italian was stripped of the captaincy and it instead went to the 22-year-old Ferguson. An incident in which two bags of ice were thrown at the Celtic dug-out during a 2–0 defeat at Ibrox in September 2001 was attributed to Ferguson, who was criticised for his petulance and immaturity. Celtic manager Martin O'Neill played down the incident, saying he thought the ice had been thrown by his club's doctor. The young Ferguson went on to successfully guide his team to a League Cup and Scottish Cup later that season under manager Alex McLeish, who had replaced Advocaat in December 2001. In the latter final, another Old Firm clash, Ferguson tied the score at 2–2 with a free kick (Peter Lovenkrands scored the winning goal).

During their second season together, 2002–03, Ferguson captained the side to a domestic treble. After scoring 18 goals from midfield, he also won Scottish Football Writers' Association Footballer of the Year and Scottish PFA Players' Player of the Year.

==== Blackburn Rovers ====
On 29 August 2003, Ferguson joined Premier League club Blackburn Rovers for a fee of £7.5 million. With Everton also chasing Ferguson, Rangers had initially denied that he was leaving. He made his Blackburn debut in a Premier League match against Liverpool on 19 September at Ewood Park, and scored his first goal against the same team, also at Ewood Park, during a League Cup match on 29 October.

Graeme Souness made Ferguson captain of Blackburn in July 2004 and he seemed to be adapting well to Premiership football, despite the team still struggling and a managerial change, which saw Mark Hughes replacing Souness. However, after 16 months at the club, including a lengthy period out through injury after fracturing his kneecap in a Premiership match against Newcastle United, during the January 2005 transfer window, Ferguson submitted a written transfer request, admitting that the draw of playing in the Premiership and a Lancashire derby could not compare with an Old Firm match, nor could the team's desire to win be matched.

==== Rangers (second spell) ====
After much discussion between the clubs, a fee of £4.5 million was agreed and Ferguson rejoined Rangers just before the close of the transfer window. Ferguson later said that the fee Rangers paid was actually £100,000 plus the fees Blackburn owed from the original transfer. Ferguson's second debut for Rangers came in a League Cup semi-final victory over Dundee United. He was a 69th-minute substitute for Alex Rae during the 7–1 win. His first goal after his return was the opening goal in a 1–1 draw against Inverness CT on 5 March 2005. Ferguson played in the 2005 Scottish League Cup final and was part of the Rangers team that won the league title on the last day of the season.

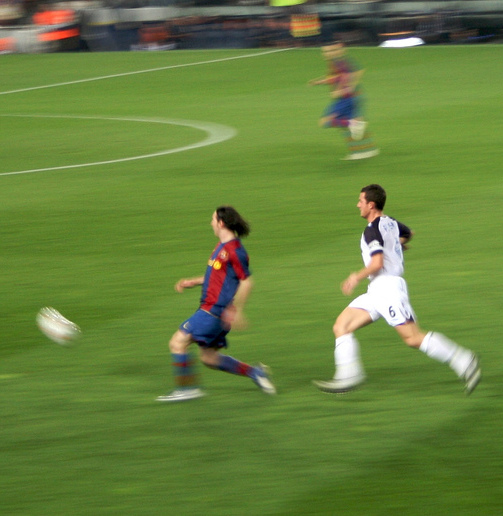
Ferguson (right, with Lionel Messi) playing for Rangers against Barcelona in a UEFA Champions League match in 2007

At the start of the 2005–06 season, manager Alex McLeish re-appointed Ferguson as club captain. McLeish had not wanted to remove the captaincy mid-season from Fernando Ricksen. Ferguson played the latter part of the season carrying an ankle injury as Rangers ended up in a third-place finish in the Premier League. At the end of the season, Ferguson revealed that he had snapped ligaments and confessed that he should have undergone the surgery sooner.

After an incident in the dressing room at Caledonian Stadium, Inverness, on 27 December 2006, it was announced on BBC Radio Scotland's New Year's Day broadcast of Sportsound that Ferguson had been stripped of the Rangers captaincy after a meeting with then manager Paul Le Guen. He was also dropped from the squad for the next match. Later Le Guen claimed Ferguson was undermining him. "I'll go on record as saying I never had one bust-up with him, never had one argument with him. I don't know where all this comes from," explained Ferguson eleven years later. "No disrespect to Inverness Caley – they had good players, no doubt – but we're Rangers here. We were dropping points against teams that we should be beating. So, I let it out a wee bit. There was no arguments, nothing in the dressing room. After I had said that, we flew back down to Glasgow. We were playing Motherwell next, I think, and I came in the day of, or the day before, the Motherwell game. I came in, put my bag down, Yves Colleu, who was the assistant manager, comes in and says, 'Paul wants to speak to you'. I went into his office and went to sit down, and [Le Guen] said, 'Don't sit down. That's you finished; you won't play with Rangers again.'"

The match at Motherwell was won 1–0 by Rangers, and goalscorer Kris Boyd reportedly showed solidarity with the deposed skipper by holding up six fingers, in reference to Ferguson's shirt number. Following the resignation of Le Guen as manager on 4 January, Ferguson was re-instated to the Rangers side by caretaker manager Ian Durrant and was also re-appointed as captain. Later that year, sports journalist Graham Spiers published Paul Le Guen: Enigma, documenting his tenure at the club. According to Spiers, Le Guen left because he was being "undermined" by other Rangers personnel, including Ferguson and then club doctor, Ian McGuinness.

The 2007–08 season began with Ferguson scoring twice in the first SPL match against Inverness. His scoring form continued and he netted the second in a 3–0 win over rivals Celtic, as well as in the UEFA Champions League against VfB Stuttgart. The Old Firm goal was Ferguson's first against Celtic since the 2002 Scottish Cup Final.

In January 2008, he scored a controversial goal in Rangers' 2007–08 Scottish League Cup semi-final win against Hearts. He later admitted to handling the ball in the buildup to the goal but that the infringement was unintentional. Rangers went on to win both the League Cup final and the Scottish Cup final.

On 14 May 2008, Ferguson made his 400th appearance for Rangers in the UEFA Cup Final against Zenit Saint Petersburg at the City of Manchester Stadium; he captained the side to a 2–0 defeat.

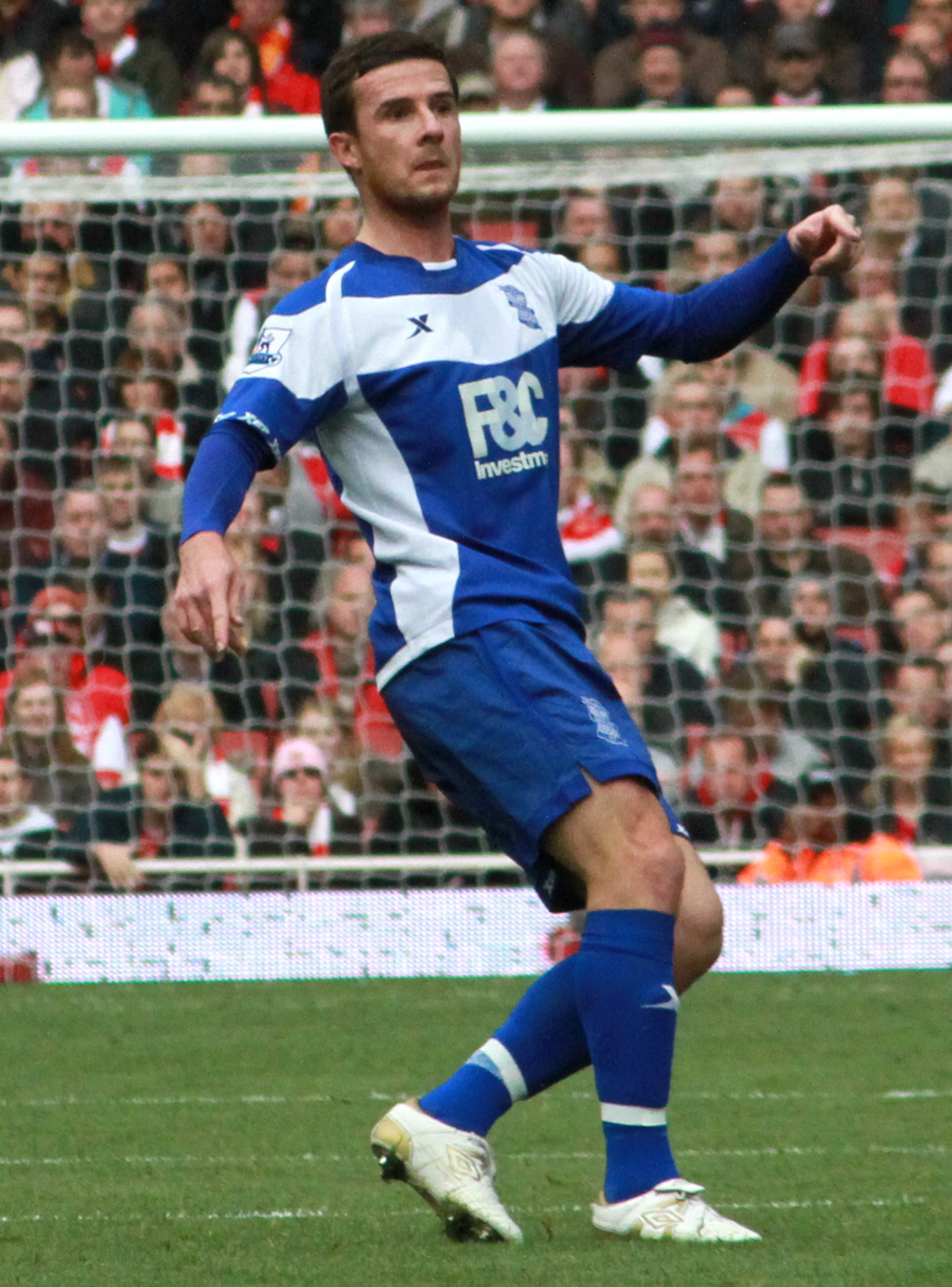
Ferguson playing for Birmingham City in 2010

The summer of 2008 saw Ferguson undergo an operation on a fresh injury problem that would see him ruled out until early November; the injury was not the same one that plagued him towards the end of the season prior. He returned to the first team on 1 November in a 5–0 league win over Inverness at Ibrox.

In April 2009, after an extended hotel drinking session with Rangers teammate Allan McGregor after Scotland's defeat to the Netherlands, followed by both players making inappropriate gestures while on the bench during the next match against Iceland, Ferguson was stripped of the captain's armband for both club and country. He recovered from this setback to help Rangers win the 2009 Scottish Cup Final against Falkirk (his last match for the club, having not started since the Scotland incident). Rangers also won the SPL title but missed out on another treble with a defeat in the 2009 Scottish League Cup Final.

Ferguson was inducted into the Rangers F.C. Hall of Fame in 2004 at the age of 26.

==== Appearance records ====
Ferguson made 82 appearances in European competitions, all of them for Rangers, which made him the record European appearance holder at the club. Ferguson overtook David Narey's record for the number of European appearances made whilst playing for a Scottish club by starting in a UEFA Cup match against Werder Bremen. He broke Kenny Dalglish's record for the number of competitive European appearances by a Scottish footballer when he played in his 80th match in Europe, against Sporting CP.

==== Birmingham City ====
On 17 July 2009, Ferguson completed a move to English Premier League newcomers Birmingham City on a three-year contract for an undisclosed fee, reported as "in the region of £1.2m". Joining up with boss Alex McLeish once again, the former Rangers manager said that Ferguson has "unfinished business in England" and that he believed the former Scottish international to be "very capable of competing with the best players in the Premier League." He made his debut in the opening game of the season, against Manchester United on 15 August 2009, and his first goal for the club came as the only goal of the FA Cup third round replay against Nottingham Forest in January 2010. Ferguson won the Birmingham City players' Player of the Year award for 2009–10.

Ferguson helped Birmingham beat Arsenal in the 2011 League Cup Final at Wembley, despite playing the last hour of the game with a broken rib. During both of his two seasons with Birmingham, Ferguson made over two thousand passes without recording an assist. In season 2009–10 Ferguson had the highest number of completed passes of any player in the Barclays Premier League, according to Opta statistics.

==== Blackpool ====
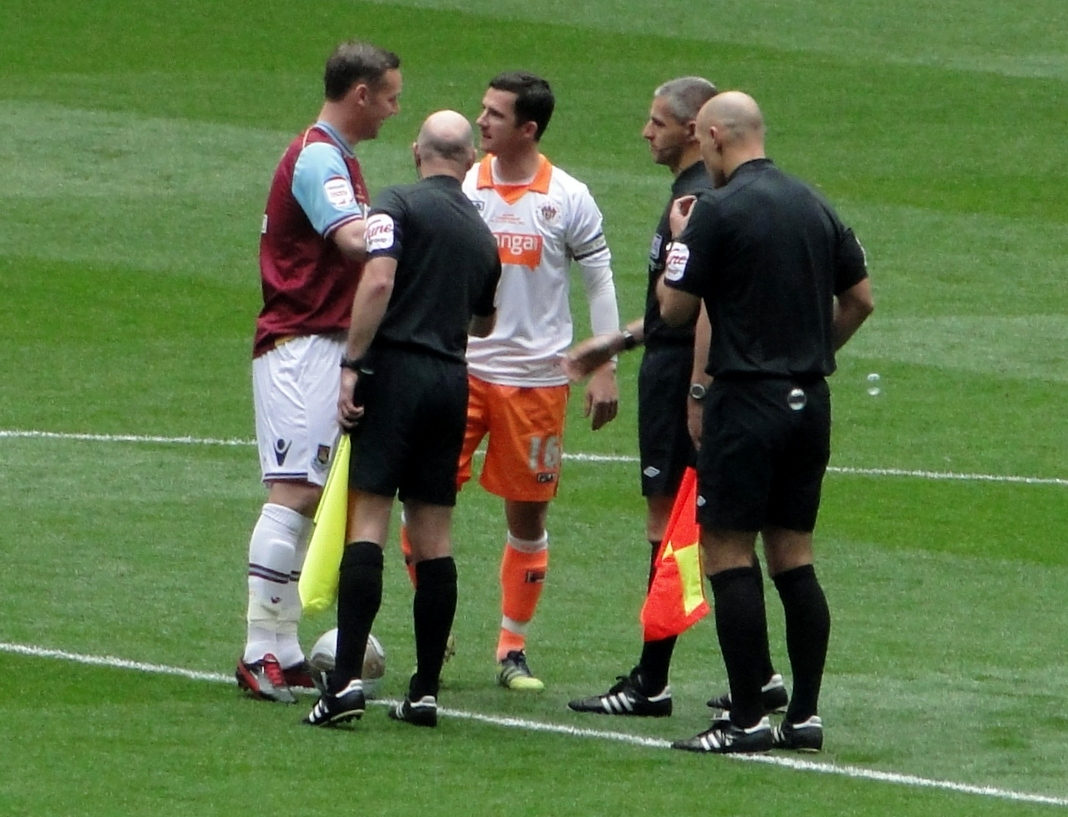
Ferguson, as captain of Blackpool, with Kevin Nolan before the 2012 Football League Championship play-off final

With Birmingham needing to reduce their wage bill following their relegation from the Premier League, Ferguson joined Championship club Blackpool on 22 July 2011 for an undisclosed fee, reported to be around £750,000. This enabled him to move closer to his family in Scotland, and he signed a two-year deal, with the option of staying on for a further year. He was given the captain's armband (taking over from Charlie Adam, who had departed for Liverpool) for the club's opening League fixture at Hull City on 5 August.

Ferguson scored his first goal for the Seasiders in a 2–0 victory over Ipswich Town at Bloomfield Road on 10 September. It was his first goal in English league football for seven years.

In late October 2012, after a falling out with chairman Karl Oyston, Ferguson was made to train with the Blackpool youth team. Early the following month, he received a call from Micky Mellon, manager of nearby Fleetwood Town. Although he doubted Ferguson would want to play in League Two, Mellon put forward the offer of coming on loan. Ferguson accepted, the only such move of his career, and spent three months at Highbury Avenue.

Ferguson was reinstated to the side by Paul Ince on 20 February in his first game in charge, a 2–0 defeat at Leeds United. He had been named as a substitute for the previous couple of games, under the caretaker-managership of Steve Thompson. He was given the captain's armband, in the absence of Alex Baptiste, for the home victory over Derby County on 26 April.

In October 2013, Ferguson had a sixth and final operation on his ankle, which kept him out until 3 December. "After the surgery, the surgeon said, "Right, it's over. Don't try [playing] again."

On 21 January 2014, Ferguson was installed as Blackpool's caretaker manager in the wake of Ince's sacking. "I didn't want to take it, but nobody else would take the job," Ferguson explained in 2020. "And it was a chance to keep the club up." He initially stated that he would not be playing while in the managerial role, but on 12 April, at Leeds, he named himself in the starting line-up in an attempt to stave off the threat of relegation. "Bob [Malcolm] says to me, 'You'll need to come back in.' I said, 'Bob, I've not trained for six weeks.' He said, 'You'll need to come back and play; we're struggling.'"

Although Blackpool won only three of their twenty games with Ferguson in charge, they avoided relegation by two points. Ferguson left Blackpool at the end of the 2013–14 season.

=== International ===
Ferguson made twelve appearances for Scotland's under-21 team. He made his full international debut at the age of 20 against Lithuania on 5 September 1998. However, an injury-plagued season prevented him from picking up more caps. Indeed, Ferguson did not return to the Scotland set up until a year later, starting in a 2–1 win against Bosnia-Herzegovina on 4 September 1999.

He was appointed captain of the national side in 2004 by then-manager Berti Vogts, following the retirement of Paul Lambert. Ferguson captained Scotland a total of 28 times. He led the side to a single-goal victory over former World Champions France 1–0 at the Parc des Princes in Paris on 12 September 2007. This completed a double-header of single-goal victories against the French during the UEFA Euro 2008 qualifying campaign.

Ferguson received criticism for being a disruptive influence on the team despite captaining his country for years. On 3 April 2009, he was banned from ever representing Scotland again after serious breaches of squad discipline, and the captain's armband was given to Darren Fletcher. Additionally, Ferguson's club, Rangers, stripped him of the captain's role and suspended him for two weeks without pay.

Following the dismissal of George Burley as manager of Scotland, SFA chief executive Gordon Smith confirmed that the incoming manager would be free to select Ferguson should he so wish. On 6 July 2010, Scotland coach Craig Levein confirmed that Ferguson will not play for Scotland again. Levein had hoped he would return, but Ferguson informed him that he wanted to focus on club football instead.

== Coaching career ==
=== Clyde ===
In June 2014, Ferguson was appointed player-manager of Scottish League Two club Clyde. Clyde were drawn away to Rangers in the Challenge Cup after a 2–0 home win against Ayr United; Rangers won 8–1. On 27 September, Ferguson made his playing debut against Annan Athletic in a 1–1 draw at Broadwood, but came off early in the second half with an injury. Towards the end of the 2–0 defeat to Lowland League club Spartans in the second round of the Scottish Cup, Ferguson was sent to the stands after a verbal altercation with Clyde supporters. In April 2015, Ferguson said that he had retired as a player.

In his second season at Clyde, the team came third and reached the play-offs, in which they defeated Elgin City 5–1 on aggregate in the semi-finals. In the final, however, they lost 3–2 to Queen's Park, despite winning the second leg 1–0 at Hampden. Clyde went on a poor run of form during his third season, failing to win a league match in December, January or February. With the club sitting in eighth place in late February, Ferguson resigned.

=== Kelty Hearts ===
In October 2018, Ferguson had discussions with Lowland League club Kelty Hearts about becoming their new manager. He was offered and accepted the position later that month. Hearts finished third in the Lowland League in Ferguson's first season in charge. They won the championship the following season, 2019–20, after it was curtailed due to the COVID-19 pandemic.

Ferguson guided Kelty into the SPFL for the first time in their history when they beat Brechin City over two legs in the Scottish League Two play-offs at the end of the 2020–21 campaign. The result also ended Brechin City's 67-year stint in the senior leagues. A day after the play-offs ended, Ferguson left Kelty.

=== Alloa Athletic ===
Shortly after leaving Kelty, Ferguson was appointed manager of Alloa Athletic. After struggling in the league, the club announced on 14 February 2022 that Ferguson had tendered his resignation.

=== Rangers ===
On 24 February 2025, Ferguson was appointed as interim head coach of Scottish Premiership club Rangers following the dismissal of Philippe Clement. He brought former teammates Neil McCann, Billy Dodds and Allan McGregor onto the coaching team.

== Media career ==
Ferguson regularly appears on STV's Peter & Roughie's Football Show and the online sports show PLZ Soccer – Football Show. He also has a regular column in the Daily Record newspaper.

== Personal life ==
Ferguson is married to Margaret, a trained psychologist. They have three children. His son, Kyle, is also a professional footballer, a centre back who signed for Harrogate Town in June 2022.

During the 2014 Scottish independence referendum Ferguson was a supporter of the Better Together campaign against Scottish independence.

In July 2017 it was reported that Ferguson successfully applied for bankruptcy after running up debts of £1,425,633, whilst having only £3,000 worth of assets to help pay off his creditors. Ferguson exited bankruptcy in July 2018, having co-operated with an insolvency firm.

== Career statistics ==
=== Club ===
Appearances and goals by club, season and competition
Club	Season	League			National cup (Note: Includes Scottish Cup, FA Cup)		League cup (Note: Includes Scottish League Cup, Football League Cup)		Europe		Other		Total	
Club	Season	Division	Apps	Goals	Apps	Goals	Apps	Goals	Apps	Goals	Apps	Goals	Apps	Goals
Rangers	1996–97	Scottish Premier Division	1	0	0	0	0	0	0	0	–		1	0
Rangers	1997–98	Scottish Premier Division	7	0	4	0	0	0	0	0	–		11	0
Rangers	1998–99	Scottish Premier League	23	1	3	0	4	1	10 (Note: Appearances in UEFA Cup)	0	–		40	2
Rangers	1999–2000	Scottish Premier League	31	4	5	1	1	0	12 (Note: Ten appearances in UEFA Champions League, two in UEFA Cup)	0	–		49	5
Rangers	2000–01	Scottish Premier League	30	2	3	1	3	1	11 (Note: Ten appearances in UEFA Champions League, one in UEFA Cup)	0	–		47	4
Rangers	2001–02	Scottish Premier League	22	1	5	2	3	1	9 (Note: Two appearances in UEFA Champions League, seven appearances two goals in UEFA Cup)	2	–		39	6
Rangers	2002–03	Scottish Premier League	36	16	6	2	4	0	2	0	–		48	18
Rangers	2003–04	Scottish Premier League	3	0	–		–		2 (Note: Appearances in UEFA Champions League)	0	–		5	0
Rangers	Total		153	24	26	6	15	3	46	2	–		240	35
Blackburn Rovers	2003–04	Premier League	15	1	0	0	1	1	–		–		16	2
Blackburn Rovers	2004–05	Premier League	21	2	1	0	0	0	–		–		22	2
Blackburn Rovers	Total		36	3	1	0	1	1	–		–		38	4
Rangers	2004–05	Scottish Premier League	13	2	–		2	0	–		–		15	2
Rangers	2005–06	Scottish Premier League	32	5	2	0	2	0	10	0	–		46	5
Rangers	2006–07	Scottish Premier League	32	4	1	0	0	0	8	3	–		41	7
Rangers	2007–08	Scottish Premier League	38	7	3	0	3	1	18 (Note: Ten appearances and one goal in UEFA Champions League, eight in UEFA Cup)	1	–		62	9
Rangers	2008–09	Scottish Premier League	22	2	3	0	2	0	0	0	–		27	2
Rangers	Total		137	20	9	0	9	1	36	4	–		191	25
Birmingham City	2009–10	Premier League	37	0	5	2	1	0	–		–		43	2
Birmingham City	2010–11	Premier League	35	0	1	0	5	0	–		–		41	0
Birmingham City	Total		72	0	6	2	6	0	–		–		84	2
Blackpool	2011–12	Championship	42	1	0	0	0	0	–		3 (Note: Appearances in Football League play-offs)	0	45	1
Blackpool	2012–13	Championship	19	0	–		1	0	–		–		20	0
Blackpool	2013–14	Championship	19	0	1	0	1	0	–		–		21	0
Blackpool	Total		80	1	1	0	2	0	–		3	0	86	1
Fleetwood Town (loan)	2012–13	League Two	6	0	2	0	–		–		–		8	0
Clyde	2014–15	Scottish League Two	1	0	0	0	0	0	–		0	0	1	0
Career total			485	47	45	8	33	5	82	7	3	0	648	67

=== International ===
Scores and results list Scotland's goal tally first, score column indicates score after each Ferguson goal.

List of international goals scored by Barry Ferguson
No.	Date	Venue	Opponent	Score	Result	Competition
1	30 May 2000	Lansdowne Road, Dublin, Ireland	Republic of Ireland	2–1	2–1	Friendly
2	7 September 2002	Svangaskarð, Toftir, Faroe	Faroe Islands	2–2	2–2	UEFA Euro 2004 qualifying
3	17 November 2007	Hampden Park, Glasgow, Scotland	Italy	1–1	1–2	UEFA Euro 2008 qualifying

=== Managerial record ===
As of match played 17 May 2025

Managerial record by team and tenure
Team	From	To	Record				
Team	From	To	P	W	D	L	Win %
Blackpool (caretaker)	21 January 2014	3 May 2014	20	3	5	12	15.0
Clyde	13 June 2014	26 February 2017	120	46	23	51	38.3
Kelty Hearts	18 October 2018	24 May 2021	70	46	12	12	65.7
Alloa Athletic	27 May 2021	14 February 2022	33	9	8	16	27.3
Rangers (interim)	24 February 2025	18 May 2025	15	6	5	4	40.0
Total			257	110	53	94	42.8

== Honours ==
=== As a player ===
Rangers

- Scottish Premier League: 1998–99, 1999–2000, 2002–03, 2004–05, 2008–09
- Scottish Cup: 1999–2000, 2001–02, 2002–03, 2007–08, 2008–09
- Scottish League Cup: 1998–99, 2001–02, 2002–03, 2004–05, 2007–08
- UEFA Cup runner-up: 2007–08

Birmingham City

- Football League Cup: 2010–11

Individual

- PFA Scotland Young Player of the Year:1998–99
- SFWA Footballer of the Year: 1999–2000, 2002–03
- SPFA Players' Player of the Year: 2002–03
- SPL Player of the Month: November 2000, December 2000, February 2002, January 2003
- Ferguson became a Member of the Order of the British Empire (MBE) on 17 June 2006.

=== As a manager ===
Kelty Hearts

- Lowland League: 2019–20, 2020–21 (promoted after winning the Scottish League Two play-offs)

== See also ==
- List of Scotland national football team captains
- List of Scottish football families
