= 2002 Scottish League Cup final =

- Event: 2001–02 Scottish League Cup
Ayr United	Rangers
0	4
- Date: 17 March 2002
- Venue: Hampden Park, Glasgow
- Man of the Match: Claudio Caniggia
- Referee: Hugh Dallas
- Attendance: 50,076

The 2001–02 Scottish League Cup final was played on 17 March 2002 at Hampden Park in Glasgow and was the final of the 55th Scottish League Cup. The final was contested by Ayr United and Rangers, and was Ayr's first appearance in a national final. Rangers won the match 4–0, thanks to goals from Tore Andre Flo, a penalty from Barry Ferguson and a double from Claudio Caniggia.

== Match details ==
17 March 2002

Ayr United	0–4	Rangers
	Report	Flo 44'; Ferguson 49' (pen.); Caniggia 75', 90'

Hampden Park, Glasgow
Attendance: 50,076
Referee: Hugh Dallas

Ayr United	Rangers

AYR UNITED :
GK	1	(Scotland) Craig Nelson
RB	2	(Scotland) John Robertson
CB	5	(Scotland) John Hughes (c)
CB	6	(Scotland) David Craig
LB	3	(Scotland) Paul Lovering
RM	8	(Scotland) Pat McGinlay
CM	7	(Scotland) Marvyn Wilson	(substituted off) 88'
CM	4	(Scotland) Neil Duffy
LM	11	(Scotland) Paul Sheerin
CF	9	(Scotland) Brian McLaughlin	(substituted off) 81'
CF	10	(Scotland) James Grady
Substitutes:
GK	17	(Scotland) John Dodds
DF	12	(Scotland) Craig McEwan
MF	14	(Scotland) Lee Sharp
MF	16	(Scotland) Scott Chaplain	(substituted in) 88'
FW	15	(Scotland) Stewart Kean	(substituted in) 81'
Manager:
(Scotland) Gordon Dalziel

RANGERS :
GK	1	(Germany) Stefan Klos
RB	25	(Australia) Tony Vidmar	(substituted off) 74'
CB	4	(Italy) Lorenzo Amoruso
CB	15	(Netherlands) Bert Konterman
LB	5	(Netherlands) Arthur Numan
RM	2	(Netherlands) Fernando Ricksen
CM	20	(Trinidad and Tobago) Russell Latapy	(substituted off) 77'
CM	6	(Scotland) Barry Ferguson (c)
LM	26	(Denmark) Peter Løvenkrands	(substituted off) 64'
CF	7	(Argentina) Claudio Caniggia
CF	9	(Norway) Tore André Flo
Substitutes:
GK	33	(Scotland) Allan McGregor
MF	17	(Russia) Andrei Kanchelskis
MF	27	(Scotland) Stephen Hughes	(substituted in) 74'
MF	11	(Scotland) Neil McCann	(substituted in) 64'
FW	16	(Scotland) Billy Dodds	(substituted in) 77'
Manager:
(Scotland) Alex McLeish
