= 2002 Scottish Cup final =

2002 Scottish Cup Final
- Event: 2001–02 Scottish Cup
| Celtic | Rangers |
| 2 | 3 |
- Date: 4 May 2002
- Venue: Hampden Park, Glasgow
- Man of the Match: Peter Løvenkrands
- Referee: Hugh Dallas
- Attendance: 51,138

The 2002 Scottish Cup Final was played on 4 May 2002 at Hampden Park in Glasgow and was the final of the 117th Scottish Cup. Celtic and Rangers contested the match, Rangers won the match 3–2, thanks to Peter Løvenkrands's last-minute goal.

This was the last Old Firm Scottish Cup final for 22 years until 2024.

== Match details ==
4 May 2002

| Celtic | 2–3 | Rangers |
|---|---|---|
| Hartson 19'; Baldé 50' | Report | Løvenkrands 21', 90'; Ferguson 69' |

Hampden Park, Glasgow
Attendance: 51,138
Referee: Hugh Dallas

CELTIC:
| GK | 20 | (Scotland) Robert Douglas |
| DF | 35 | (Sweden) Johan Mjällby |
| DF | 6 | (Guinea) Bobo Baldé |
| DF | 17 | (France) Didier Agathe |
| MF | 18 | (Northern Ireland) Neil Lennon |
| MF | 14 | (Scotland) Paul Lambert (c) | (substituted off) 45' |
| MF | 19 | (Bulgaria) Stiliyan Petrov |
| MF | 8 | (England) Alan Thompson |
| FW | 7 | (Sweden) Henrik Larsson |
| FW | 9 | (England) Chris Sutton |
| FW | 10 | (Wales) John Hartson |
Substitutes:
| GK | 1 | (Scotland) Jonathan Gould |
| DF | 2 | (Scotland) Tom Boyd |
| DF | 4 | (Scotland) Jackie McNamara | (substituted on) 45' |
| MF | 25 | (Slovakia) Ľubomír Moravčík |
| MF | 30 | (England) Steve Guppy |
Manager:
(Northern Ireland) Martin O'Neill

RANGERS:
| GK | 1 | (Germany) Stefan Klos |
| DF | 8 | (Scotland) Maurice Ross |
| DF | 4 | (Italy) Lorenzo Amoruso |
| DF | 3 | (Australia) Craig Moore |
| DF | 5 | (Netherlands) Arthur Numan |
| MF | 6 | (Scotland) Barry Ferguson (c) |
| MF | 10 | (Netherlands) Ronald de Boer |
| MF | 2 | (Netherlands) Fernando Ricksen |
| MF | 9 | (Denmark) Peter Løvenkrands |
| FW | 11 | (Scotland) Neil McCann |
| FW | 7 | (Argentina) Claudio Caniggia | (substituted off) 22' |
Substitutes:
| GK | 12 | (Scotland) Allan McGregor |
| DF | 14 | (Australia) Tony Vidmar |
| MF | 15 | (Germany) Christian Nerlinger |
| FW | 16 | (Norway) Tore André Flo |
| FW | 17 | (Georgia (country)) Shota Arveladze | (substituted on) 22' |
Manager:
(Scotland) Alex McLeish
