= Alex McLeish =

Scottish football manager (born 1959)

Alex McLeish OBE
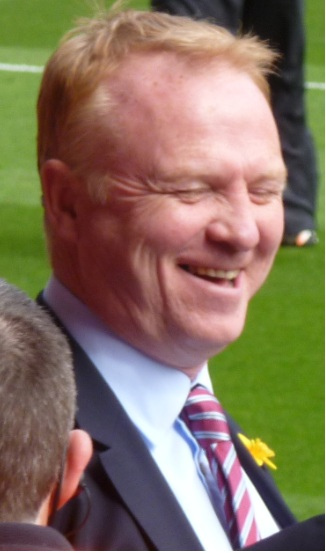
- McLeish as Aston Villa manager in 2012

Personal information
- Full name: Alexander McLeish
- Date of birth: 21 January 1959 (age 67)
- Place of birth: Glasgow, Scotland
- Height: 6 ft 1 in (1.85 m)
- Position: Defender

Youth career
- Glasgow United
- 1976–1978: Aberdeen

Senior career*
Years	Team	Apps	(Gls)
1978–1994	Aberdeen	493	(25)
1976	→ Lewis United		
1994–1995	Motherwell	3	(0)
Total		496	(25)

International career
1978–1987	Scotland U21	6	(0)
1980–1993	Scotland	77	(0)

Managerial career
- 1994–1998: Motherwell
- 1998–2001: Hibernian
- 2001–2006: Rangers
- 2007: Scotland
- 2007: Scotland B
- 2007–2011: Birmingham City
- 2011–2012: Aston Villa
- 2012–2013: Nottingham Forest
- 2014–2015: Genk
- 2016: Zamalek
- 2018–2019: Scotland
- * Club domestic league appearances and goals

Alexander McLeish OBE (born 21 January 1959) is a Scottish professional football manager and former player. He played as a defender for Aberdeen during their 1980s glory years, making nearly 500 League appearances for the club, and won 77 caps for Scotland.

McLeish started his managerial career with spells at Motherwell and Hibernian, before guiding Rangers to two championships and five cup wins in five years. McLeish spent ten months as manager of the Scotland national team which narrowly failed to qualify for the finals of the 2008 UEFA European championship. He then resigned this post in November 2007 to become manager of Birmingham City, who were in the Premier League at the time. Though Birmingham were relegated at the end of the season, McLeish guided them back to the Premier League in 2009. Birmingham then won the 2011 Football League Cup Final, but were relegated again from the Premier League at the end of the 2010–11 season.

Following this relegation, he resigned his post at Birmingham to become the manager of their city rivals, Aston Villa. This made him the first manager to move directly from Birmingham City to Aston Villa, and only the second manager after Ron Saunders to manage both clubs. Having only narrowly avoided relegation in the 2011–12 Premier League season, his contract was terminated by Villa at the end of his first season. McLeish was appointed manager of Championship club Nottingham Forest in December 2012, but left after 40 days by mutual consent. He managed Belgian Pro League club Genk in the 2014–15 season, and Zamalek of the Egyptian Premier League in 2016. He then had a second stint as Scotland national team manager.

In recognition of his distinguished service to Scottish sport, in 2008, McLeish was awarded an honorary doctorate by the University of Aberdeen.

== Early years ==
McLeish was born in Duke Street Hospital, Glasgow to parents Alex, a shipyard worker, and Jean. He has younger siblings Angela and Ian. After living in the Parkhead and Kinning Park districts of the city, the family moved to Barrhead, Renfrewshire soon after McLeish had reached school age. He attended Springhill Primary, Barrhead High School – where he was one year below future Aberdeen and Scotland teammate Peter Weir – and John Neilson High School in Paisley.

As a juvenile, he played for Barrhead Youth Club, alongside Weir, and Glasgow United as well as training for a short period with Hamilton Accies. After a local cup final with Glasgow United in 1976, which was watched by a delegation from Aberdeen, including then manager Ally MacLeod, McLeish signed for the Pittodrie club the following day.

== Playing career ==
=== Club ===
McLeish spent the majority of his first two seasons at Aberdeen in the reserves and also had a loan spell at local Junior side Lewis United. McLeish won the Scottish 2nd XI Cup with the Dons in 1978. He made his competitive debut under Billy McNeill in a New Year fixture against Dundee United on 2 January 1978. His first major final appearance was under the management of Alex Ferguson as a substitute in a 2–1 defeat to Rangers in the 1978–79 League Cup and most of his appearances during the 1970s were as a midfielder, with Willie Garner and Doug Rougvie preferred in defence. However, McLeish eventually made the centre-back position his own, and over the next seven seasons he enjoyed great success, winning eight domestic and two European trophies. Highlights included scoring in a 4–1 victory over Rangers in the 1982 Scottish Cup Final on his 200th Dons appearance, and a vital goal against Bayern Munich during the campaign leading to the European Cup Winners' Cup win over Real Madrid in 1983.

During this period, McLeish formed a formidable defensive triumvirate with Willie Miller and Jim Leighton for both club and country. Even after he had won his first Scotland cap, McLeish's father asked then Aberdeen boss Alex Ferguson to persuade him to continue training as an accountant. When Ferguson left in 1986 to go to Manchester United, he tried to get McLeish to sign, but it did not work out; he also had talks with Tottenham Hotspur. A testimonial match was arranged for McLeish in December 1988, with the club's 'Gothenburg' (Cup Winners' Cup) squad taking on an 'International legends' team. He won the Scottish player of the year in 1990, after a season in which Aberdeen won both domestic cups.

He became captain of Aberdeen after the retirement of Willie Miller. His 692 competitive appearances for the club ranks as the second-most in its history (100 behind Miller, but almost 100 more than Bobby Clark).

=== International ===
McLeish is Scotland's seventh most capped player, having gained 77 international caps between 1980 and 1993. He was first capped for the Scotland under-21 team while still a reserve player at Aberdeen by his former club manager Ally MacLeod, eventually gaining six caps at that level. His full international debut came on 26 March 1980 against Portugal, manager Jock Stein playing him in midfield alongside Archie Gemmill and Graeme Souness. He played in three World Cups with Scotland, in 1982, 1986 and 1990. He is a member of the Scottish Football Hall of Fame, the Scotland national football team roll of honour and Scottish Television's fan poll Scotland's Greatest Team. On the occasion of his 50th cap, against Luxembourg in 1987, McLeish was appointed team captain for the game. His final cap came on 17 February 1993 in a 3–0 win over Malta at Hampden Park during the 1994 World Cup qualifiers.

== Management career ==
=== Motherwell ===
After his successful playing career, he quickly went into football management with Motherwell in 1994, one year before he retired as a player. His first season at Motherwell saw him take the Lanarkshire club to second in the Premier Division behind Walter Smith's Rangers. However, he failed to build on this success and the next two seasons were spent in relegation battles. He resigned as manager to take over at Hibernian in 1998.

=== Hibernian ===
McLeish took over a struggling Hibernian side, which was relegated from the Scottish Premier Division in 1998 despite a slight upturn in fortunes under McLeish. He then guided the Edinburgh team back to the Scottish Premier League at the first attempt by winning the First Division championship.

Hibernian consolidated in their first season back in the top division, finishing mid-table and reaching the Scottish Cup semi-final. In the 2000–01 season, Hibs started very strongly. Eventually, they had to settle for third place and a Scottish Cup final appearance. This performance attracted the attention of bigger clubs, including West Ham United and Rangers.

McLeish attracted players such as Russell Latapy and former French international Franck Sauzée to Hibs. He also helped develop young striker Kenny Miller, who would later go on to play 69 games for Scotland.

During this period, McLeish worked towards and was awarded a UEFA Pro Licence.

=== Rangers ===
His work at Hibs was noticed, and he was linked with several moves to England, before he was appointed as Rangers manager in December 2001 after outgoing Rangers manager Dick Advocaat recommended McLeish to chairman David Murray.

McLeish was an instant success at Rangers, winning both the Scottish Cup and Scottish League Cup in his first season, but the big prize of the league title was essentially lost before his arrival. His second season saw him go one better when he won the domestic treble, with the help of players such as Ronald de Boer and Barry Ferguson.

Rangers' worsening financial state saw many of his top players leave in the summer of 2003. Celtic won the league comfortably in 2003–04 season, and Rangers failed to win any trophies. McLeish was consequently put under pressure from fans after his poor signings and a record run of seven consecutive Old Firm derby losses to Celtic.

The high-profile Bosman signings of Jean-Alain Boumsong and Dado Pršo in the close season of 2004–05 gave Rangers renewed hope of regaining the title from Celtic's grasp. McLeish's team won the 2005 league title on a dramatic last day, an outcome that had looked highly unlikely after Rangers fell five points behind leaders Celtic with just four games remaining.

After this unexpected success, McLeish and his Rangers team headed into the 2005–06 SPL campaign as favourites to retain the championship. McLeish made a number of signings, including Julien Rodriguez and Ian Murray, despite having little money to spend. After a reasonable start to the season, including a win over Celtic, Rangers suffered a series of poor results between September and November. This period included a club record of ten games without a win. However, the tenth match of this run, a 1–1 draw with Inter Milan in the Champions League, took Rangers into the knockout stages of the tournament for the first time.

Despite the poor domestic form, McLeish guided Rangers to the last 16 of the Champions League, where they were defeated on the away goals rule by Villarreal. They became the first Scottish team to progress this far in the European Cup since 1993, and the first Scottish team to progress through a European group stage. In December, chairman David Murray publicly announced his support for McLeish. Rangers then went on a good run of results in December and January.

This run of good results came to a sudden halt when they were defeated 3–0 by Hibernian in the Scottish Cup, prompting protests outside Ibrox against both McLeish and David Murray. On 9 February 2006, it was announced by chairman David Murray that McLeish would be standing down as manager at the end of that season.

It was later announced that he would be succeeded by former Lyon manager Paul Le Guen. Rangers beat Hearts 2–0 at Ibrox in his final match as manager.

=== Scotland national team ===
McLeish said after leaving Rangers that he would not manage another Scottish club, because he felt that he had achieved everything in the Scottish game. He was linked in the media with a number of managerial positions in England while he worked as a television pundit for the BBC and Setanta Sports.

McLeish took charge of the Scotland national team on 29 January 2007. His assistants in the job were Roy Aitken and Andy Watson. McLeish's first game in charge of the national team was a UEFA Euro 2008 qualifying match, a 2–1 victory against Georgia on 24 March 2007 at Hampden Park. His second game was an away fixture against Italy on 28 March 2007 which ended in a 2–0 defeat.

McLeish's Scotland side then went on to defeat the Faroe Islands away in June, Lithuania at home in September before recording a historic victory in Paris four days later by defeating France 1–0 at the Parc des Princes. James McFadden's 64th-minute strike from 30 yards was enough to earn Scotland the win and returned them to the top of Group B with three games to play. This result has been hailed as one of the Scotland national team's greatest victories. Scotland's next success was at home to Ukraine, winning 3–1 at Hampden on 13 October. McLeish suffered his second defeat as manager, away in Georgia on 17 October. This result left Scotland facing a decider against the World Champions, Italy. Scotland lost the game 2–1, McLeish's last, and Italy qualified for the finals.

=== Birmingham City ===
Premier League club Birmingham City's approach to the SFA for permission to speak to McLeish about their managerial vacancy was refused; but, on his return on 27 November 2007 from attending the draw for 2010 FIFA World Cup qualification in South Africa, he resigned his post as manager of Scotland and was announced as Birmingham's new manager the following day. His assistants with Scotland, Roy Aitken and Andy Watson, were to accompany him. McLeish said he wanted to return to working with players on a daily basis and had "always harboured a desire" to manage in the Premier League.

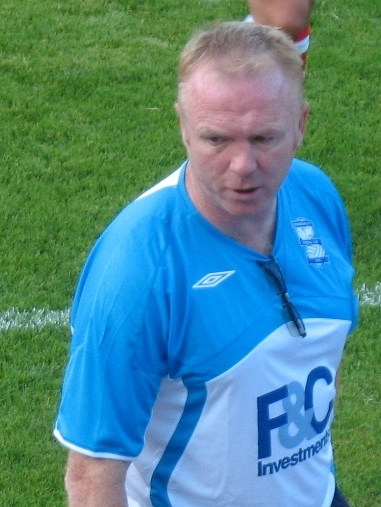
McLeish as Birmingham City manager in 2009

He enjoyed a positive managerial debut with Birmingham, winning 3–2 away to Tottenham Hotspur. In the January 2008 transfer window, McLeish strengthened Birmingham's squad, buying David Murphy and James McFadden and signing Argentina under-20 international Mauro Zárate on loan, while generating funds by allowing fringe players to leave. He was unable to save Birmingham from relegation, despite the team recording an impressive 4–1 victory over Blackburn Rovers on the last day of the season.

McLeish changed the club's backroom staff and training procedures, appointed David Watson as goalkeeping coach, and overhauled the scouting setup, bringing in Paul Montgomery – the scout who recommended a relatively unknown Didier Drogba to West Ham United – to oversee player recruitment.

On the final day of the 2008–09 season, McLeish secured Birmingham's return to the top flight of English football at the first attempt with a 2–1 away victory over Reading. By mid-January 2010, he had guided them to a 12-game unbeaten run, a club record in the top division, set a Premier League record by selecting the same starting eleven for nine consecutive games, and been named Premier League Manager of the Month for December 2009, the first Birmingham manager to receive the award. By the end of the season McLeish had led Birmingham to ninth place, their highest finish for more than 50 years.

Following Birmingham's success during the 2009–10 season, McLeish agreed a new three-year deal with the club in September 2010. In February 2011, McLeish led Birmingham to victory in the League Cup, defeating favourites Arsenal 2–1 in the final at Wembley in what he described as "relatively speaking, ... [his] greatest achievement". However, a poor run of form followed the League Cup win, and Birmingham were relegated to the Championship on the last day of the 2010–11 season. The directors confirmed that McLeish would keep his job, and would be expected to return the club to the Premier League at the first opportunity. McLeish however opted to quit Birmingham City on 12 June 2011 by email.

=== Aston Villa ===
On 17 June 2011, Aston Villa appointed McLeish as manager, just five days after leaving their local rivals Birmingham City. There was much controversy surrounding his appointment as Birmingham City claimed McLeish was still under contract and filed a complaint against Aston Villa to the Premier League while Villa claimed McLeish was a free agent. Aston Villa fans protested outside Villa Park and anti-McLeish graffiti had to be removed from outside Villa's training ground. McLeish made out of favour Manchester City goalkeeper Shay Given his first signing, and then recruited winger Charles N'Zogbia. McLeish's first competitive game as Villa manager ended in a 0–0 draw with Fulham at Craven Cottage. He gained his first Premier League win as manager of Villa in a 3–1 win over Blackburn Rovers. Following victory over Blackburn, Villa drew their next four Premier League games until winning against Wigan 2–0. Aston Villa finally ended their unbeaten start with a 4–1 defeat away at Manchester City. McLeish's side secured a surprise win over Chelsea just before signing LA Galaxy striker Robbie Keane on loan. Keane helped to secure Villa a crucial win against rivals Wolves in a 3–2 victory. McLeish led the 2011–12 Villa team to 16th place in the Premier League, avoiding relegation by two points, and set an unwanted club record of only four home wins. McLeish's contract was terminated on 14 May, the day after the season ended. The reasons cited for his termination were the poor results and style of play used throughout his term as manager.

=== Nottingham Forest ===
McLeish was appointed manager of Football League Championship club Nottingham Forest on 27 December 2012. His first game in charge was on 29 December 2012, a 2–2 draw against Crystal Palace at the City Ground, with Billy Sharp scoring an injury-time equaliser for Nottingham Forest. McLeish earned his first win as Nottingham Forest manager on 12 January 2013, a 2–1 victory against Peterborough at home. McLeish took charge of his only East Midlands derby against Derby County on 19 January 2013, drawing 1–1 at Pride Park.

On 2 February 2013, after a 2–1 defeat to former club Birmingham City on his first return to St Andrew's, he refused to commit his future to Nottingham Forest and claimed he was unhappy. This came after the Nottingham Forest board pulled out of a deal to sign George Boyd on the final day of the January transfer window. On 5 February 2013, he left the club by mutual consent.

=== Genk ===
McLeish stated in November 2013 that he would like to re-enter football management in some capacity, in England, Scotland or abroad. In August 2014, he was appointed manager of Belgian club Genk. McLeish made his managerial debut on 30 August, in which Genk drew Oostende 1–1 away. It was reported in March 2015 that McLeish would leave Genk at the end of the 2014-15 season, as the club had failed to qualify for the Championship play-offs, although they did reach Europa League play-offs.

=== Zamalek ===
McLeish was appointed manager of Egyptian Premier League club Zamalek on 28 February 2016. After a series of poor performances from the team, he was sacked on 2 May with ten matches of the season remaining.

=== Scotland national team (second spell) ===
McLeish was reappointed Scotland manager on 16 February 2018, on a two-year contract. Scotland won their 2018–19 UEFA Nations League group against Albania snd Israel. McLeish was sacked on 18 April 2019 following a shocking 3–0 defeat by Kazakhstan. During his tenure, McLeish also convinced Scott McTominay to play for Scotland.

== Outside of football ==
McLeish had a cameo appearance in the Laurel and Hardy biopic Stan & Ollie, after a chance meeting with director and Aberdeen fan Jon S. Baird on a flight. In the film, McLeish can be briefly seen reading a newspaper in the lobby of the Savoy Hotel behind Steve Coogan.

During the 2014 Scottish independence referendum, McLeish was a supporter of the Better Together campaign against Scottish independence.

McLeish was appointed Officer of the Order of the British Empire (OBE) in the 2024 New Year Honours for services to charity.

== Career statistics ==
=== Club ===
Appearances and goals by club, season and competition
Club	Season	League		Scottish Cup		League Cup		Europe		Total	
Club	Season	Apps	Goals	Apps	Goals	Apps	Goals	Apps	Goals	Apps	Goals
Aberdeen	1977–78	1	0	0	0	0	0	0	0	1	0
Aberdeen	1978–79	19	1	3	0	4	0	3	0	25	1
Aberdeen	1979–80	35	2	4	0	11	1	1	0	51	3
Aberdeen	1980–81	33	3	2	0	5	0	3	0	43	3
Aberdeen	1981–82	32	5	6	1	8	0	4	0	50	6
Aberdeen	1982–83	34	2	5	0	7	0	10	1	54	3
Aberdeen	1983–84	32	2	7	0	10	0	10	0	59	2
Aberdeen	1984–85	30	1	6	0	1	0	2	0	38	1
Aberdeen	1985–86	34	3	6	1	6	0	6	0	52	4
Aberdeen	1986–87	40	3	3	0	3	0	2	0	48	3
Aberdeen	1987–88	36	1	5	0	2	0	4	0	47	1
Aberdeen	1988–89	34	0	5	0	5	0	2	0	46	0
Aberdeen	1989–90	32	2	5	0	4	0	2	0	43	2
Aberdeen	1990–91	33	0	1	0	3	0	4	0	41	0
Aberdeen	1991–92	7	0	0	0	0	0	0	0	7	0
Aberdeen	1992–93	27	0	6	0	2	0	0	0	35	0
Aberdeen	1993–94	35	0	4	0	3	1	3	0	45	1
Motherwell	1994–95	3	0	0	0	0	0	1	0	4	0
Career total		496	25	68	2	74	2	57	1	696	30

=== International ===
Appearances and goals by national team and year
National team	Year	Apps	Goals
Scotland	1980	7	0
Scotland	1981	6	0
Scotland	1982	4	0
Scotland	1983	10	0
Scotland	1984	6	0
Scotland	1985	8	0
Scotland	1986	3	0
Scotland	1987	6	0
Scotland	1988	8	0
Scotland	1989	8	0
Scotland	1990	8	0
Scotland	1991	2	0
Scotland	1992	0	0
Scotland	1993	1	0
Total		77	0

=== Managerial record ===
Managerial record by team and tenure
Team	From	To	Record				
Team	From	To	P	W	D	L	Win %
Motherwell	13 July 1994	10 February 1998	156	48	45	63	30.8
Hibernian	11 February 1998	11 December 2001	164	77	42	45	47.0
Rangers	13 December 2001	8 May 2006	235	155	44	36	66.0
Scotland	29 January 2007	27 November 2007	10	7	0	3	70.0
Scotland B	7 February 2007	20 November 2007	2	0	2	0	0.0
Birmingham City	28 November 2007	12 June 2011	168	62	51	55	36.9
Aston Villa	17 June 2011	14 May 2012	42	9	17	16	21.4
Nottingham Forest	27 December 2012	5 February 2013	7	1	2	4	14.3
Genk	22 August 2014	22 June 2015	35	18	10	7	51.4
Zamalek	28 February 2016	2 May 2016	10	6	2	2	60.0
Scotland	16 February 2018	18 April 2019	12	5	0	7	41.7
Total			841	388	215	238	46.1

== Honours ==
=== Player ===
Aberdeen

- Scottish Premier Division: 1979–80, 1983–84, 1984–85
- Scottish Cup: 1981–82, 1982–83, 1983–84, 1985–86, 1989–90
- Scottish League Cup: 1985–86, 1989–90
- Drybrough Cup: 1980
- European Cup Winners' Cup: 1982–83
- European Super Cup: 1983

Scotland

- Rous Cup: 1985

Individual

- Scotland national football team roll of honour: 1987
- SFWA Footballer of the Year: 1990

=== Manager ===
Hibernian

- Scottish First Division: 1998–99

Rangers

- Scottish Premier League: 2002–03, 2004–05
- Scottish Cup: 2001–02, 2002–03
- Scottish League Cup: 2001–02, 2002–03, 2004–05

Birmingham City

- Football League Championship runner-up (promotion): 2008–09
- Football League Cup: 2010–11

Individual

- Scottish Football Hall of Fame: inducted 2005
- Scottish Premier League Manager of the Month: October 2000, February 2002, September 2002, February 2003, August 2003, September 2003, November 2004, February 2005, January 2006
- Premier League Manager of the Month: December 2009

== See also ==
- List of Scotland national football team captains
