= Bert Konterman =

Dutch football manager (born 1971)

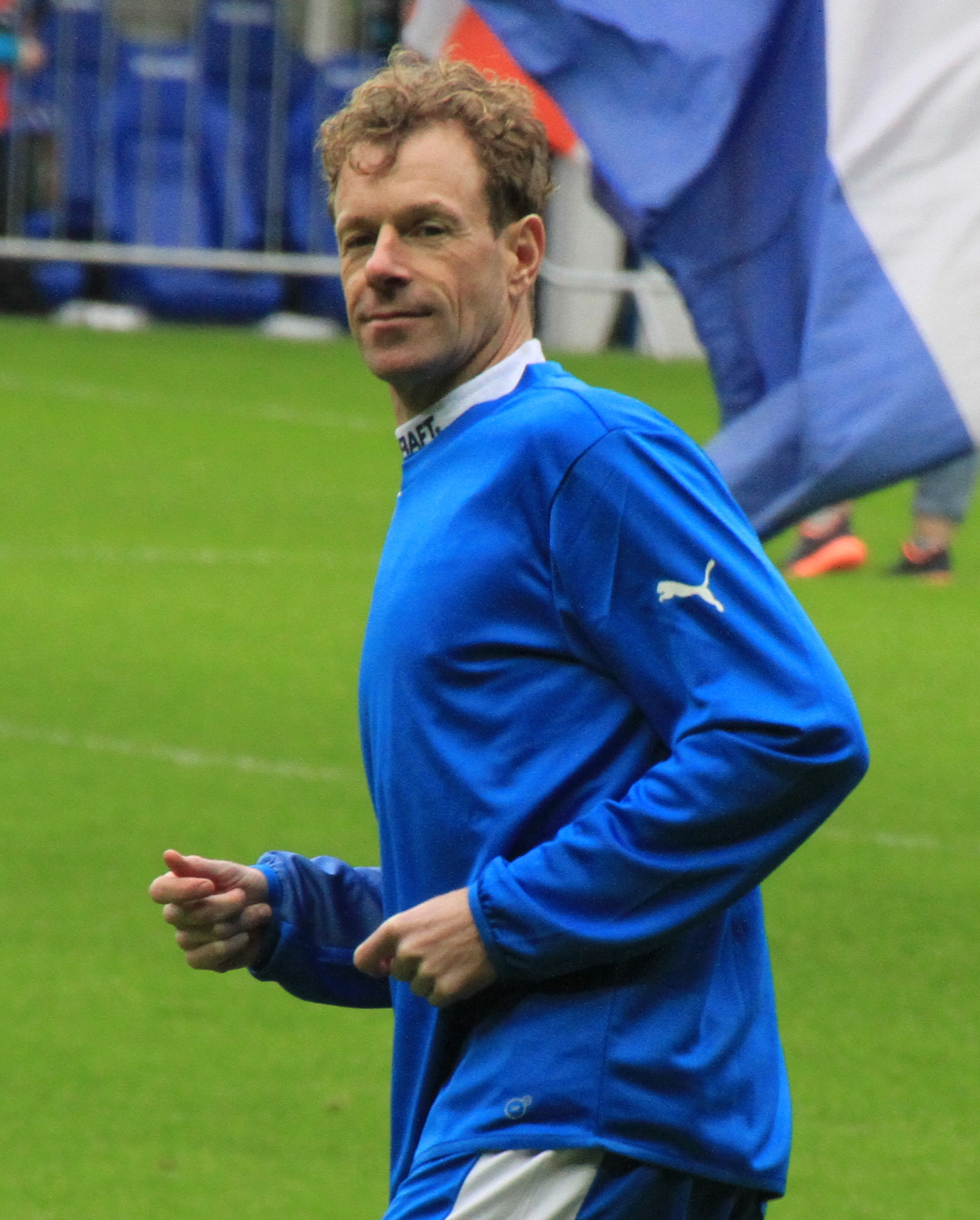
- Konterman in 2015

Personal information
- Date of birth: 14 January 1971 (age 55)
- Place of birth: Rouveen, Netherlands
- Height: 1.88 m (6 ft 2 in)
- Position: Defender

Senior career*
Years	Team	Apps	(Gls)
1989–1993	FC Zwolle	121	(7)
1993–1996	Cambuur	96	(19)
1996–1998	Willem II	78	(10)
1998–2000	Feyenoord	65	(4)
2000–2003	Rangers	79	(5)
2003–2004	Vitesse	31	(0)
Total		470	(45)

International career
1999–2000	Netherlands	12	(0)

Managerial career
- 2010–2012: FC Zwolle (U15)
- 2011–2014: Netherlands U19 (assistant)
- 2013–2014: Jong Twente (assistant)
- 2014–2015: Netherlands U20 (assistant)
- 2014–2017: Twente (U19)
- 2017–2018: Netherlands U18
- 2017–2018: Netherlands U17 (assistant)
- 2017–2018: Netherlands U20
- 2020–: Netherlands U19
- 2021: PEC Zwolle (caretaker)
Medal record
Men's football
Representing Netherlands
UEFA European Championship
Bronze medal – third place	2000 Belgium-Netherlands
- * Club domestic league appearances and goals

Bert Konterman (Dutch pronunciation: [ˈbɛrt ˈkɔntərmɑn], born 14 January 1971) is a Dutch former professional footballer who played as a defender.

== Playing career ==
Born in Rouveen, Konterman's career began with the local amateur club SC Rouveen, then went on to play for clubs in the Dutch Eredivisie including FC Zwolle, Cambuur and Willem II.

In summer 1998, he moved to Feyenoord on a four-year contract.

Konterman was snapped up by Dick Advocaat in 2000 to play for Rangers for a fee of £4.5 million. He was part of a growing Dutch influence at Ibrox under Advocaat, but did not make a similarly impressive impact to the likes of Ronald de Boer and Arthur Numan. He endured a difficult start at Ibrox in defence; however, following the arrival of Alex McLeish, Konterman was often used in an advanced role in the heart of the midfield. In this position, he had a more successful spell at the club including netting a winning strike after extra time from 30 yards against arch rivals Celtic in a League Cup semi-final. Konterman went on to play in the final against Ayr United, however a persistent toe injury meant the League Cup Final was his final appearance of the season. This meant he missed out on Rangers' victory in the 2002 Scottish Cup Final. The following season, 2002–03, brought even more success as Konterman helped Rangers win a domestic treble of league, Scottish Cup and Scottish League Cup. Konterman contributed 16 league appearances to their title winning campaign and also played as they won the 2003 Scottish League Cup Final. However he didn't feature in the 2003 Scottish Cup Final.

After a three-year spell with Rangers, and winning six caps for the Netherlands national team, Konterman returned home in the summer of 2003, signing for Vitesse.

He retired in June 2004.

== Managerial career ==
After retiring, Konterman began coaching at football camps. In 2009, he took up the position of technical director at Dutch club FC Zwolle. Konterman was going to be the head coach of the club's U15s and support the other coaches at the club.

In October 2011, he was also appointed assistant manager of Wim van Zwam for Netherlands U19 national team. On 1 July 2012, he stepped down from his position at Zwolle.

On 3 September 2013, he was appointed assistant manager for Jong Twente. In addition to his work for Jong Twente, Konterman would also continue as an assistant coach for Netherlands' 19s. Konterman had several roles at Twente, including supporting the coaches of the U19s and the first team. From 2014 to 2017, he was the head coach of the U19s.

In June 2017, Konterman took charge of Netherlands U18 national team and was also going to be assistant manager of the U17s. In the following season, he was promoted to U20 national team manager. On 26 February 2020, he was also appointed caretaker manager of the U19s, following Maarten Stekelenburg's promotion to the A-team.

== Personal life ==
Konterman is a Christian.

== Honours ==
Feyenoord

- Eredivisie: 1998–99
- Johan Cruyff Shield: 1999

Rangers

- Scottish Premier League: 2003
- Scottish League Cup: 2002, 2003
