= 2002–03 Scottish League Cup =

2002–03 Co-operative Insurance Cup
Tournament details
- Country: Scotland

Final positions
- Champions: Rangers
- Runners-up: Celtic

The 2002–03 Scottish League Cup was the 57th staging of the Scotland's football knockout competition, also known for sponsorship reasons as the CIS Insurance Cup.

The competition was won by Rangers, who defeated Celtic 2–1 in the Final.

== First round ==
Home team	Score	Away team
Stirling Albion	(p)3 – 3	Stenhousemuir
Clyde	0–1	Ross County
Cowdenbeath	3–2	Montrose
Falkirk	2–0	Peterhead
Inverness Caledonian Thistle	2–0	Dumbarton
Raith Rovers	2–3	Alloa Athletic
Airdrie United	1–0	Elgin City
Albion Rovers	0–1	Hamilton Academical
Berwick Rangers	4–2	Arbroath
Gretna	1–2	East Fife
Morton	2–3	St Mirren
Queen of the South	2–0	Forfar Athletic
Queen's Park	1–0	East Stirlingshire
Stranraer	6–1	Brechin City

== Second round ==
Home team	Score	Away team
Dundee	3–1	Queen of the South
Stirling Albion	2–3	Heart of Midlothian
Alloa Athletic	0–2	Hibernian
Ayr United	0–2	Falkirk
Berwick Rangers	0–3	Partick Thistle
Cowdenbeath	1–2	Dunfermline Athletic
Dundee United	4–1	Queen's Park
East Fife	0–2	Motherwell
Inverness Caledonian Thistle	3–1	St Mirren
Kilmarnock	0 – 0(p)	Airdrie United
Ross County	3–0	Hamilton Academical
Stranraer	1–3	St Johnstone

== Third round ==
22 October 2002

Dunfermline Athletic	2–0	Falkirk
Crawford 2', 79'	Report

East End Park, Dunfermline
Attendance: 6,933
Referee: Willie Young

22 October 2002

Partick Thistle	1–0	Dundee
Hardie 83'	Report

Firhill Stadium, Glasgow
Attendance: 2,652
Referee: Stuart Dougal

23 October 2002

Celtic	4–2	Inverness Caledonian Thistle
Maloney 4'; Hartson 20', 61'; Thompson 44'	Report	Ritchie 10'; Wyness 72'

Celtic Park, Glasgow
Attendance: 34,592
Referee: Mike McCurry

23 October 2002

Heart of Midlothian	3–0	Ross County
Pressley 56' (pen.); Valois 59'; Simmons 85'	Report

Tynecastle Stadium, Edinburgh
Attendance: 6,454
Referee: John Rowbotham

24 October 2002

Hibernian	2–3	Rangers
Murray 6'; O'Connor 72'	Report	Townsley 22' (o.g.); Caniggia 25'; Løvenkrands 78'

Easter Road, Edinburgh
Referee: Hugh Dallas

29 October 2002

Airdrie United	1–2	Dundee United
Vella 90'	Report	Thompson 61', 68'

Excelsior Stadium, Airdrie
Attendance: 1,768
Referee: Dougie McDonald

5 November 2002

St Johnstone	0–1	Livingston
	Report	Dadi 60'

McDiarmid Park, Perth
Attendance: 2,688
Referee: Tom Brown

6 November 2002

Aberdeen	3–1	Motherwell
Mike 23'; Deloumeaux 24'; Michie 42'	Report	Adams 41'

Pittodrie Stadium, Aberdeen
Attendance: 6,557
Referee: John Rowbotham

== Quarter-finals ==
6 November 2002

Celtic	1–1 (a.e.t.) (5–4 pen.)	Partick Thistle
Lambert 42'	Report	Burns 50'

Celtic Park, Glasgow
Attendance: 26,333
Referee: Willie Young

7 November 2002

Dunfermline Athletic	0–1	Rangers
	Report	Caniggia 79'

East End Park, Dunfermline
Attendance: 8,415
Referee: Dougie McDonald

12 November 2002

Aberdeen	0–1	Heart of Midlothian
	Report	McKenna 66'

Pittodrie Stadium, Aberdeen
Attendance: 7,576
Referee: John Underhill

13 November 2002

Livingston	0–2	Dundee United
	Report	Lilley 38', 73' (pen.)

Almondvale Stadium, Livingston
Attendance: 3,592
Referee: Mike McCurry

== Semi-finals ==
4 February 2003

Heart of Midlothian	0–1	Rangers
	Report	De Boer 27'

Hampden Park, Glasgow
Attendance: 31,609
Referee: Mike McCurry

6 February 2003

Celtic	3–0	Dundee United
Baldé 52', 90'; Larsson 80'	Report

Hampden Park, Glasgow
Attendance: 18,856
Referee: Stuart Dougal

== Final ==
16 March 2003

Celtic	1–2	Rangers
Larsson 57'	Report	Caniggia 23'; Løvenkrands 35'

Hampden Park, Glasgow
Attendance: 52,000
Referee: Kenny Clark
