= 2001–02 Scottish League Cup =

2001–02 Co-operative Insurance Cup
Tournament details
- Country: Scotland

Final positions
- Champions: Rangers
- Runners-up: Ayr United

The 2001–02 Scottish League Cup was the 56th staging of the Scotland's second most prestigious football knockout competition, also known for sponsorship reasons as the CIS Insurance Cup.

The competition was won by Rangers, who defeated Ayr United 4–0 in the final.

== First round ==
Home team	Score	Away team
Queen's Park	0–1	Hamilton Academical
Stirling Albion	3–2	Cowdenbeath
Airdrieonians	3–0	Morton
Albion Rovers	0–2	Inverness Caledonian Thistle
Alloa Athletic	4–0	Peterhead
Berwick Rangers	0–3	Partick Thistle
Clyde	(p)2 – 2	Stenhousemuir
Dumbarton	2–0	Clydebank
East Fife	1–0	Arbroath
East Stirlingshire	0–3	Queen of the South
Forfar Athletic	1–2	Falkirk
Raith Rovers	1–0	Montrose
Ross County	3–0	Brechin City
Elgin City	2–3	Stranraer

== Second round ==
Home team	Score	Away team
Clyde	1–2	St Johnstone
Dunfermline Athletic	3–0	Alloa Athletic
Hamilton Academical	0–2	Dundee
Inverness Caledonian Thistle	(p)3 – 3	Partick Thistle
Livingston	3–0	East Fife
Stirling Albion	2–1	St Mirren
Airdrieonians	2–1	Motherwell
Ayr United	4–0	Stranraer
Dundee United	3–0	Dumbarton
Falkirk	0–2	Raith Rovers
Queen of the South	1–2	Aberdeen
Ross County	(p)0 – 0	Heart of Midlothian

== Third round ==
Home team	Score	Away team
Celtic	8–0	Stirling Albion
Aberdeen	1–6	Livingston
Ayr United	(p)0 – 0	Kilmarnock
Dundee United	3–2	St Johnstone
Dunfermline Athletic	1 – 1(p)	Inverness Caledonian Thistle
Raith Rovers	0–2	Hibernian
Rangers	3–0	Airdrieonians
Ross County	2–1	Dundee

== Quarter-finals ==
Home team	Score	Away team
Livingston	0–2	Celtic
Ayr United	5–1	Inverness Caledonian Thistle
Ross County	1–2	Rangers
Hibernian	2–0	Dundee United

== Semi-finals ==
5 February 2002

Rangers	2–1 (a.e.t.)	Celtic
Løvenkrands 45'; Konterman 105'	Report	Baldé 74'

Hampden Park, Glasgow
Attendance: 43,457
Referee: Kenny Clark

6 February 2002

Hibernian	0–1 (a.e.t.)	Ayr United
	Report	Annand 101' (pen.)

Hampden Park, Glasgow
Attendance: 11,779
Referee: Mike McCurry

== Final ==
17 March 2002

Ayr United	0–4	Rangers
	Report	Flo 44'; Ferguson 49' (pen.); Caniggia 75', 90'

Hampden Park, Glasgow
Attendance: 50,076
Referee: Hugh Dallas
