= Peter Løvenkrands =

Danish footballer (born 1980)

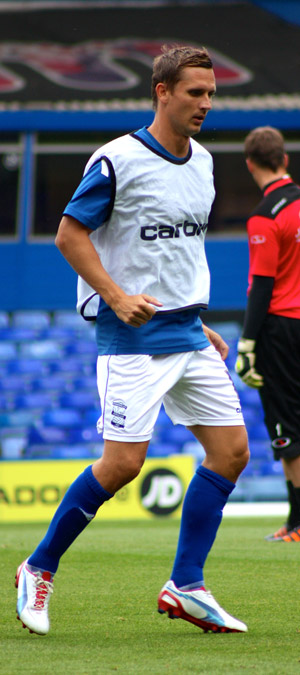
- With Birmingham City in 2012 pre-season

Personal information
- Full name: Peter Rosenkrands Løvenkrands
- Date of birth: 29 January 1980 (age 46)
- Place of birth: Hørsholm, Denmark
- Height: 1.81 m (5 ft 11 in)
- Positions: Striker; winger

Youth career
- 1985–1997: Lillerød

Senior career*
Years	Team	Apps	(Gls)
1998–2000	AB	32	(7)
2000–2006	Rangers	129	(37)
2006–2009	Schalke 04	44	(6)
2008–2009	Schalke 04 II	3	(2)
2009	Newcastle United	12	(3)
2009–2012	Newcastle United	63	(19)
2012–2014	Birmingham City	37	(4)
Total		313	(76)

International career
1997–1999	Denmark U19	8	(5)
1998–2001	Denmark U21	13	(7)
2002–2010	Denmark	22	(1)

Managerial career
- 2017–2018: Rangers (academy coach)
- 2018–2020: Rangers B
- 2021–2022: Fremad Amager
- 2023–2024: AaB Fodbold (U-19 manager)
- 2023–2024: AaB Fodbold (first team assistant)
- * Club domestic league appearances and goals

Peter Rosenkrands Løvenkrands (born 29 January 1980) is a Danish professional football manager and former player. He played mainly as a striker or as a winger, and was known for his pace.

Løvenkrands began his career in his native Denmark, winning the 1999 Danish Cup with Akademisk Boldklub. He then moved to Scottish club Rangers where he played for six years and won seven major honours, including two Scottish Premier League titles. He signed for German team Schalke 04 in 2006, but eventually fell out of favour during his last season there, and transferred to Premier League side Newcastle United in the winter of 2008. After three and a half seasons he moved to Birmingham City, who released him at the end of the 2013–14 season and he subsequently retired.

He won the 1998 Danish Under-19 Player of the Year award. He played 21 times and scored a single goal for the Danish national team, representing them at the 2002 FIFA World Cup and Euro 2004 tournaments.

== Club career ==
=== Akademisk Boldklub ===
Born in Hørsholm, Løvenkrands signed his first professional contract with Danish Superliga club Akademisk Boldklub (AB) in February 1998. He made his Superliga debut in July 1998, and was quickly touted as a future Danish national team player by his manager Christian Andersen. He was a part of the 1999 Danish Cup-winning AB team, though he did not play in the final against Aalborg BK.

=== Rangers ===
Løvenkrands joined Scottish club Rangers for £1.4 million in June 2000. After making his debut in a league match against Dunfermline he only played sporadically in his first season at Rangers, making just 10 appearances in all competitions. The following season, 2001-02, he played more frequently and scored his first goal for the club in a UEFA Cup tie against Dynamo Moscow. He went on to play 182 games for Rangers, winning two Scottish Premier League championships. He scored 54 goals for Rangers, including a last-minute winner against Old Firm rivals Celtic in the 2002 Scottish Cup Final. During his time at Rangers, he was often played out of position as a left winger instead of his natural position of centre forward. He played the 2005–06 season in the centre forward position, as well as on the left wing, and had his highest-scoring season at Rangers.

In August 2005, he trialled for English Premier League club Middlesbrough, but decided not to move. He started the 2005–06 season still with Rangers. He played an important role in Rangers' run to the last 16 of the UEFA Champions League, scoring four goals during the 2005–06 campaign. In the group stage, he opened the scoring in the 3–2 win against Porto, and with his goal in the 1–1 draw against Inter Milan he secured Rangers' progression to the knock-out round. In the round of 16, he scored in both the home and away game, though Rangers were eventually eliminated by Villarreal on the away goals rule. He netted a total of fourteen goals during the 2005–06 SPL season, the highest tally of his Ibrox career.

=== Schalke 04 ===
After six years at Rangers, his contract expired in summer 2006 and he left the club on a free transfer. Løvenkrands was reportedly in talks with a number of clubs, including Spanish club Osasuna, Roma from Italy and English side Newcastle United. He eventually signed for German club Schalke 04 on 23 May 2006, joining fellow Danish international Søren Larsen.

Løvenkrands enjoyed a successful first season at Schalke, playing as a left winger and contributing six goals and four assists. In the decisive part of the season, however, he picked up an injury and was side-lined as Schalke missed out on the Bundesliga title. Løvenkrands' second season proved less successful. After a series of unfortunate performances without any goal, partly due to injuries, he lost his place in the starting line-up. Although fit again in February 2008, Løvenkrands did not start for Schalke under interim coaches Mike Büskens and Youri Mulder. New coach Fred Rutten chose not to employ Løvenkrands, even as Schalke struggled to remain in the race for the Bundesliga and were eliminated from the 2008–09 UEFA Cup group stage. During the winter break, Schalke announced that Løvenkrands was one of the players the club would seek to sell, and moved the player to the club's reserve team, along with Albert Streit and Carlos Grossmüller. Having played only nine minutes for the first team in the 2008–09 season, he was finally released by the club in January 2009.

=== Newcastle United ===
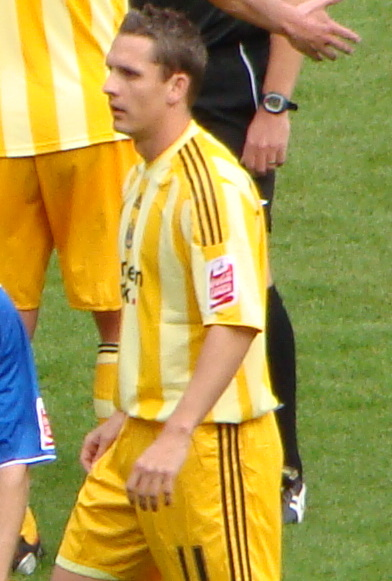
Løvenkrands playing for Newcastle United away at Cardiff City on 13 September 2009.

Løvenkrands joined Newcastle United on a two-week trial and soon signed a contract on 23 January 2009, with a duration until the end of the season. He made his first appearance coming on as a substitute in the 2–1 loss to Manchester City. Following another substitute appearance in the 1–1 draw against Sunderland, Løvenkrands made his first start against West Bromwich Albion on 7 February and scored Newcastle's second goal in their 3–2 victory in the ninth minute to make it 1–2. On 4 March, he scored the opening goal against Manchester United. This was the first goal that goalkeeper Edwin van der Sar had conceded in 1,311 minutes of football, dating back to 8 November 2008. On 11 May 2009, Løvenkrands scored Newcastle's third goal in a 3–1 victory over Middlesbrough with two games left to play. Despite the victory, Newcastle lost those last two games of the season against Fulham and Aston Villa, thus relegating them to the Championship for the 2009–10 season. He left Newcastle on 1 July 2009 after his contract with the club expired.

Løvenkrands joined Newcastle for a second spell on 1 September 2009 on a three-year contract. He was handed the number 11 shirt, formerly occupied by Damien Duff, as his previous number, 24, from his first spell at the club had been taken by Andy Carroll.

After his return to St James' Park, Løvenkrands did not start as well as he did in his first spell and played only few games. His few appearances were on the left wing, a position he felt less comfortable in. He featured in Newcastle's 2–0 defeat against Peterborough United in the League Cup, starting on the right wing. He later admitted to having "personal problems" and that was the reason for his frequent absence, he claimed that they were behind him and he was to fully concentrate on football. Shortly afterwards, he scored his first goal of the season in a 3–0 victory over Swansea City, his fourth goal for Newcastle. On 13 January 2010, Løvenkrands scored his first Newcastle hat-trick in a 3–0 FA Cup victory against Plymouth Argyle. He made himself available for the 18 January match against West Brom despite having just returned to Denmark upon his father's death. He increased his tally to nine goals by heading in a José Enrique cross to put Newcastle level in a 2–2 draw and dedicated it to his late father. From January onwards, Løvenkrands' Newcastle career picked up and he formed a strong forward partnership with Andy Carroll.

Løvenkrands found himself out of the team for the away draw with Leicester City and remained on the bench. New signing Leon Best was then selected ahead of Løvenkrands for the fixture at St James' Park against Cardiff City. Løvenkrands replaced Best after 60 minutes, and he went on to score the fourth and fifth goals of the game in an emphatic 5–1 win for Newcastle. He scored the winning goal for Newcastle in their last game of their successful season against Queens Park Rangers finishing off a successful season for both Løvenkrands and Newcastle. He did not start Newcastle's opening Premier League games, starting on the bench. He played alongside Shola Ameobi in a 3–2 away win against Accrington Stanley in the League Cup. He got his first goal of the season there, scoring the winner with a close range acrobatic volley. After a brief substitute appearance against Blackpool, he started in Newcastle's 4–3 away win against Chelsea, also in the League Cup. He scored the only goal in the 3–1 defeat to West Brom. With Carroll injured throughout January, Løvenkrands had a successful month, scoring once in a 5–0 win over West Ham and playing well a week earlier against Wigan Athletic. After the sale of Carroll to Liverpool in January, Løvenkrands gained more opportunities up front along with the likes of Leon Best and Nile Ranger. He rekindled his partnership with Best upon the injury of Ameobi in February, and Løvenkrands scored in a 2–0 victory over Birmingham City on 15 February. He continued as a regular striker until the end of the season as Best picked up an ankle injury. He ended his season by scoring in a 3–3 draw with West Bromwich Albion.

In the 2011–12 season, Løvenkrands scored twice (a goal and a penalty) in a League Cup victory over Nottingham Forest. He added one more in the next League Cup fixture, a 4–3 extra time loss to Blackburn Rovers, scoring from the spot to push the game into its latter stages. He was sidelined for much of the season with a knee injury. He was released by Newcastle on 1 June 2012.

=== Birmingham City ===
On 9 July 2012, Løvenkrands signed a two-year deal with Championship club Birmingham City, with an option for a further year. He was given squad number 11.

Løvenkrands scored his first goal for his new club on his competitive debut on 14 August, making the score 4–1 in the 5–1 defeat of Barnet in the League Cup, and kept his place for the opening match of the 2012–13 Football League season, a 1–1 draw at home to Charlton Athletic.

Birmingham confirmed he would be released when his contract expired at the end of the 2013–14 season. He finished his Birmingham career having scored 8 goals from 42 appearances in all competitions. Løvenkrands confirmed his retirement on 19 November 2014.

== International career ==
Alongside Akademisk Boldklub teammate and later Danish international Martin Albrechtsen, Løvenkrands made his debut with the Denmark under-19 national team in September 1997. He scored five goals in eight matches for the Danish under-19 national team, and was named 1998 Danish under-19 Player of the Year. He was called up for the under-21 side in March 1999, and played 12 games and scored 7 goals for the under-21s until October 2001.

While at Rangers, Løvenkrands made his senior international debut under national team coach Morten Olsen, in the 13 February 2002 friendly match 1–0 win against Saudi Arabia. Having played a total four international games, he was a part of the Danish squad at the 2002 FIFA World Cup, and played one minute in the 1–1 group stage draw with Senegal. He also participated at UEFA Euro 2004, playing five minutes in the 0–3 quarter-final defeat against the Czech Republic. In his 17th national team game on 15 November 2006, he scored his first international goal in a 1–1 friendly match draw with the Czech Republic. On 10 September 2008, he played his 21st national team game in the 3–2 2010 World Cup qualification win against Portugal, whereafter his international career went on hiatus.

His effort in the Portugal game was praised by Morten Olsen, but following the turmoil in his Schalke career, Løvenkrands had fallen out of contention for a place in the national team by September 2009. Although talks of a recall surfaced in 2010 following his impressive form at Newcastle, Løvenkrands stated that his mind was not on the recall, and he prioritised aiding the club back to the Premier League. After Newcastle's return to the Premier League, Løvenkrands played his first game for Denmark in over two years, coincidentally against Portugal, as part of a 3–1 defeat.

== Coaching career ==
Løvenkrands returned to Rangers in May 2017 as a part-time coach in the clubs Academy. On 13 June 2018, Løvenkrands announced he would be taking on the role of Reserve Team Coach at Rangers. He left Rangers in June 2020 with the intention of taking a coaching position in Japan, but COVID-19 travel restrictions meant that he had not moved there as of December 2020. On 18 June 2021, he was announced as manager of Danish 1st Division side Fremad Amager. After a mixed season in which Fremad Amager finished in 10th place, it was confirmed in June 2022 that Løvenkrands wouldn't continue at the club.

On 16 October 2023, he was announced as head coach of the under-19 team at AaB Fodbold. In addition, Løvenkrands would also act as second assistant to the first team squad. On 31 May 2024 AaB confirmed that Løvenkrands would leave the club this summer for personal reasons.

== Personal life ==
He is the younger brother of fellow footballer Tommy Løvenkrands. Their father died aged 61 on 15 January 2010 after a long illness and Løvenkrands dedicated his goal against West Bromwich Albion three days later to him. Løvenkrands has since started a charity appeal to fund research into a cure for Alzheimer's disease, from which his father suffered during the final five years of his life.

A fluent speaker of English, he developed a Glaswegian accent during his time with Rangers.

== Career statistics ==
=== Club ===
Appearances and goals by club, season and competition
Club	Season	League			National cup		League cup		Europe		Total	
Club	Season	Division	Apps	Goals	Apps	Goals	Apps	Goals	Apps	Goals	Apps	Goals
Akademisk Boldklub	1998–99	Danish Superliga	18	2							18	2
Akademisk Boldklub	1999–2000	Danish Superliga	14	5							14	5
Akademisk Boldklub	Total		32	7							32	7
Rangers	2000–01	Scottish Premier League	8	0	0	0	1	0	1	0	10	0
Rangers	2001–02	Scottish Premier League	19	2	4	3	3	1	6	1	32	7
Rangers	2002–03	Scottish Premier League	27	9	1	1	3	2	2	0	33	12
Rangers	2003–04	Scottish Premier League	25	9	2	1	2	1	7	2	36	13
Rangers	2004–05	Scottish Premier League	17	3	0	0	1	0	6	1	24	4
Rangers	2005–06	Scottish Premier League	33	14	2	0	2	0	10	4	47	18
Rangers	Total		129	37	9	5	12	4	32	8	182	54
Schalke 04	2006–07	Bundesliga	24	6	2	1	0	0	2	0	28	7
Schalke 04	2007–08	Bundesliga	20	0	2	1	0	0	5	0	27	1
Schalke 04	2008–09	Bundesliga	0	0	0	0	0	0	1	0	1	0
Schalke 04	Total		44	6	4	2	0	0	8	0	56	8
Newcastle United	2008–09	Premier League	12	3	0	0	0	0	–		12	3
Newcastle United	2009–10	Championship	29	13	2	3	1	0	–		32	16
Newcastle United	2010–11	Premier League	25	6	1	0	3	1	–		29	7
Newcastle United	2011–12	Premier League	8	0	0	0	3	3	–		11	3
Newcastle United	Total		74	22	3	3	7	4	–		84	29
Birmingham City	2012–13	Championship	22	3	1	0	2	2	–		25	5
Birmingham City	2013–14	Championship	15	1	1	0	1	2	–		17	3
Birmingham City	Total		37	4	2	0	3	4	–		42	8
Career total			313	76	18	10	22	12	40	8	401	106

== Honours ==
Akademisk Boldklub

- Danish Cup: 1998–99

Rangers

- Scottish Premier League: 2002–03, 2004–05
- Scottish Cup: 2001–02, 2002–03
- Scottish League Cup: 2001–02, 2002–03, 2004–05

Newcastle United

- Football League Championship: 2009–10

Individual

- Danish U-19 Player of the Year: 1998
