= 2001–02 Scottish Cup =

2001–02 Tennent's Scottish Cup
Tournament details
- Country: Scotland

Final positions
- Champions: Rangers
- Runners-up: Celtic

Tournament statistics
- Top goal scorer: Shota Arveladze (6)

The 2001–02 Scottish Cup was the 117th staging of Scotland's most prestigious football knockout competition. The Cup was won by Rangers, who defeated Old Firm rivals Celtic in the final.

== First round ==
Home team	Score	Away team
Albion Rovers	0 – 0	Elgin City
Alloa Athletic	3 – 1	Dumbarton
Brechin City	4 – 0	Stenhousemuir
Clydebank	1 – 0	Peterhead
Greenock Morton	1 – 2	Queen of the South
Stirling Albion	2 – 1	Buckie Thistle
Tarff Rovers	1 – 4	Montrose
Wick Academy	2 – 3	Threave Rovers

=== Replay ===
Home team	Score	Away team
Elgin City	0 – 1	Albion Rovers

== Second round ==
Home team	Score	Away team
Alloa Athletic	1 – 0	Queen of the South
Berwick Rangers	1 – 0	Cowdenbeath
Brechin City	0 – 1	Albion Rovers
Clydebank	0 – 1	Stranraer
Deveronvale	0 – 0	Spartans
East Stirlingshire	0 – 0	Forres Mechanics
Forfar Athletic	2 – 0	Threave Rovers
Gala Fairydean	1 – 0	Stirling Albion
Hamilton Academical	4 – 0	Montrose
Queen’s Park	0 – 0	East Fife

=== Replays ===
Home team	Score	Away team
East Fife	2 – 2 (4 – 2 pen.)	Queen’s Park
Forres Mechanics	3 – 1	East Stirlingshire
Spartans	1 – 2	Deveronvale

== Third round ==
Home team	Score	Away team
Albion Rovers	1 – 4	Livingston
Alloa Athletic	0 – 5	Celtic
Arbroath	0 – 2	Inverness CT
Berwick Rangers	0 – 0	Rangers
Clyde	1 – 0	St Mirren
Deveronvale	0 – 6	Ayr United
Dundee	1 – 1	Falkirk
Dundee United	3 – 0	Forres Mechanics
Dunfermline Athletic	3 – 1	Motherwell
East Fife	2 – 4	Partick Thistle
Gala Fairydean	0 – 5	Forfar Athletic
Hamilton Academical	1 – 0	Raith Rovers
Hearts	2 – 1	Ross County
Kilmarnock	3 – 0	Airdrieonians
St Johnstone	0 – 2	Aberdeen
Stranraer	0 – 0	Hibernian

=== Replays ===
Home team	Score	Away team
Falkirk	0 – 1	Dundee
Hibernian	4 – 0	Stranraer
Rangers	3 – 0	Berwick Rangers

== Fourth round ==
Home team	Score	Away team
Aberdeen	2 – 0	Livingston
Ayr United	3 – 0	Dunfermline Athletic
Clyde	1 – 2	Forfar Athletic
Dundee United	4 – 0	Hamilton Academical
Hearts	1 – 3	Inverness CT
Kilmarnock	0 – 2	Celtic
Partick Thistle	1 – 1	Dundee
Rangers	4 – 1	Hibernian

=== Replay ===
Home team	Score	Away team
Dundee	1 – 2	Partick Thistle

== Quarter-finals ==
Home team	Score	Away team
Aberdeen	0 – 2	Celtic
Dundee United	2 – 2	Ayr United
Forfar Athletic	0 – 6	Rangers
Partick Thistle	2 – 2	Inverness CT

=== Replays ===
Home team	Score	Away team
Ayr United	2 – 0	Dundee United
Inverness CT	0 – 1	Partick Thistle

== Semi-finals ==
23 March 2002

Celtic	3–0	Ayr United
Larsson 49'; Thompson 81', 88'	Report

Hampden Park, Glasgow
Attendance: 26,774
Referee: Stuart Dougal

24 March 2002

Rangers	3–0	Partick Thistle
Nerlinger 10', 72'; Ferguson 78'	Report

Hampden Park, Glasgow
Attendance: 31,969
Referee: Mike McCurry

== Final ==
4 May 2002

Celtic	2–3	Rangers
Hartson 19'; Baldé 50'	Report	Løvenkrands 21', 90'; Ferguson 69'

Hampden Park, Glasgow
Attendance: 51,138
Referee: Hugh Dallas

== Largest Wins ==
A list of the largest wins from the competition.

Score	Home team	Away team	Stage
0-6	Deveronvale	Ayr United	Third Round
0-6	Forfar Athletic	Rangers	Quarter Finals
0-5	Alloa Athletic	Celtic	Third Round
0-5	Gala Fairydean	Forfar Athletic	Third Round
