= 2002–03 Hibernian F.C. season =

Hibernian
2002–03 season
- Manager: Bobby Williamson
- SPL: 7th
- Scottish Cup: R4
- CIS Cup: R3
- Top goalscorer: League: McManus, 11; All: McManus, 11
- Highest home attendance: 13686
- Lowest home attendance: 7518
- Average home league attendance: 9937 (down 1666)

Season 2002–03 was a disappointment for Hibernian, as the team finished in the bottom half of the Scottish Premier League in Bobby Williamson's first full season in charge. The team were also knocked out of the two domestic cup competitions at an early stage. In a preview for the next season, BBC Sport commented that the biggest problem "was a fragile defence that developed a nasty habit of conceding late goals".

== League season ==
Hibs got off to a very poor start to the league season, collecting only three points from a possible 18. This included heavy defeats by Hearts and Dunfermline. Former Hibs player Ulrik Laursen commented in the match programme for his new club, Celtic, that he believed former Hibs manager Alex McLeish (now at Rangers) was to blame for this decline in fortunes, due to his decision to release popular players such as Mixu Paatelainen and Stuart Lovell. Hibs lost the game 1–0 at Celtic Park and remained bottom of the early league table, but fortunes immediately improved, as Hibs won their next five league games in succession.

This revival meant that they were in a good league position going into the third Edinburgh derby of the season, on 2 January, where victory would mean that Hibs would leapfrog Hearts into third place. Hibs twice took a two-goal lead, but conceded two goals (both scored by Graham Weir) late in stoppage time to gift Hearts a 4–4 draw. Hibs then lost their next five league games and drifted down the league, eventually finishing in 7th place.

=== Results ===
3 August 2002 SPL	Hibernian	1–2	Aberdeen	Easter Road, Edinburgh
	Luna 31'		Mackie 64'; Clark 90'	Attendance: 13,340; Referee: Toner

11 August 2002 SPL	Heart of Midlothian	5–1	Hibernian	Tynecastle, Edinburgh
	Kirk 18' de Vries 40', 66', 90', 90'		Murray 51'	Attendance: 15,245; Referee: McCurry

18 August 2002 SPL	Hibernian	2–4	Rangers	Easter Road, Edinburgh
	Townsley 35'; O'Connor 89'		de Boer 6'; Ferguson 45' (pen.); Løvenkrands 65', 87'	Attendance: 11,633; Referee: Dallas

24 August 2002 SPL	Dundee	2–1	Hibernian	Dens Park, Dundee
	Caballero 79'; Lovell 90'		O'Connor 10'	Attendance: 6,411; Referee: Young

31 August 2002 SPL	Motherwell	0–2	Hibernian	Fir Park, Motherwell
			Townsley 15', 72'	Attendance: 5,888; Referee: Clark

11 September 2002 SPL	Hibernian	1–4	Dunfermline Athletic	Easter Road, Edinburgh
	Paatelainen 42'		Walker 11'; Brewster 24', 57'; Crawford 32'	Attendance: 9,837; Referee: Dougal

14 September 2002 SPL	Celtic	1–0	Hibernian	Celtic Park, Glasgow
	Hartson 31'			Attendance: 56,703; Referee: McDonald

21 September 2002 SPL	Hibernian	2–0	Kilmarnock	Easter Road, Edinburgh
	Murray 8'; McManus 11'			Attendance: 8,680; Referee: Rowbotham

28 September 2002 SPL	Hibernian	1–0	Livingston	Easter Road, Edinburgh
	Murray 45'			Attendance: 9,541; Referee: Freeland

5 October 2002 SPL	Hibernian	2–1	Dundee United	Easter Road, Edinburgh
	O'Connor 29'; Murray 51'		Thompson 76'	Attendance: 9,175; Referee: Underhill

19 October 2002 SPL	Partick Thistle	0–3	Hibernian	Firhill Stadium, Glasgow
			O'Connor 44', 88'; Paatelainen 81'	Attendance: 5,946; Referee: Rowbotham

27 October 2002 SPL	Aberdeen	0–1	Hibernian	Pittodrie Stadium, Aberdeen
			Brebner 70'	Attendance: 12,321; Referee: Clark

3 November 2002 SPL	Hibernian	1–2	Heart of Midlothian	Easter Road, Edinburgh
	Paatelainen 36'		McKenna 86'; Stamp 90'	Attendance: 15,560; Referee: Young

10 November 2002 SPL	Rangers	2–1	Hibernian	Ibrox Stadium, Glasgow
	Mols 11'; Arveladze 35'		McManus 45'	Attendance: 48,798; Referee: McCurry

16 November 2002 SPL	Hibernian	2–1	Dundee	Easter Road, Edinburgh
	Paatelainen 12', 49' (pen.)		Novo 90'	Attendance: 8,870; Referee: Dallas

23 November 2002 SPL	Hibernian	3–1	Motherwell	Easter Road, Edinburgh
	Paatelainen 59'; McManus 64'; O'Neil 90' (pen.)		Ferguson 47'	Attendance: 8,859; Referee: McDonald

30 November 2002 SPL	Dunfermline Athletic	1–1	Hibernian	East End Park, Dunfermline
	Crawford 66'		McManus 57'	Attendance: 7,515; Referee: Fyfe

4 December 2002 SPL	Hibernian	0–1	Celtic	Easter Road, Edinburgh
			Petrov 76'	Attendance: 12,042; Referee: McCurry

7 December 2002 SPL	Dundee United	1–1	Hibernian	Tannadice Park, Dundee
	Wilson 3'		Murray 7'	Attendance: 5,673; Referee: McDonald

14 December 2002 SPL	Livingston	1–2	Hibernian	Almondvale, Livingston
	Brinquin 90'		Murray 55'; James 66'	Attendance: 6,501; Referee: Brines

21 December 2002 SPL	Kilmarnock	2–1	Hibernian	Rugby Park, Kilmarnock
	McSwegan 63'; Fulton 88'		Luna 83'	Attendance: 5,814; Referee: Dallas

26 December 2002 SPL	Hibernian	1–1	Partick Thistle	Easter Road, Edinburgh
	O'Neil 89' (pen.)		Burns 78'	Attendance: 10,317; Referee: Thomson

29 December 2002 SPL	Hibernian	2–0	Aberdeen	Easter Road, Edinburgh
	Paatelainen 70'; McManus 85'			Attendance: 11,604; Referee: Rowbotham

2 January 2003 SPL	Heart of Midlothian	4–4	Hibernian	Tynecastle, Edinburgh
	Pressley 30' (pen.) de Vries 62'; Weir 90', 90'		Townsley 11'; McManus 17'; James 89'; Brebner 90'	Attendance: 17,732; Referee: Dougal

29 January 2003 SPL	Hibernian	0–2	Rangers	Easter Road, Edinburgh
			Ferguson 58'; Caniggia 85'	Attendance: 13,686; Referee: Clark

8 February 2003 SPL	Motherwell	2–1	Hibernian	Fir Park, Motherwell
	Clarkson 31'; Fagan 41'		O'Connor 71'	Attendance: 4,999; Referee: Richmond

15 February 2003 SPL	Hibernian	1–3	Dunfermline Athletic	Easter Road, Edinburgh
	O'Connor 67'		Mason 20'; Crawford 39', 55'	Attendance: 9,175; Referee: McCurry

25 February 2003 SPL	Dundee	3–0	Hibernian	Dens Park, Dundee
	Rae 9'; Milne 86'; Murray 90' (o.g.)			Attendance: 8,414; Referee: Freeland

2 March 2003 SPL	Celtic	3–2	Hibernian	Celtic Park, Glasgow
	Hartson 1', 23'; Mjallby 90'		McManus 37', 60'	Attendance: 57,512; Referee: Young

9 March 2003 SPL	Hibernian	1–1	Dundee United	Easter Road, Edinburgh
	McManus 3'		McIntyre 69'	Attendance: 7,518; Referee: Somers

15 March 2003 SPL	Partick Thistle	0–1	Hibernian	Firhill Stadium, Glasgow
			McManus 15'	Attendance: 4,551; Referee: Mitchell

5 April 2003 SPL	Kilmarnock	6–2	Hibernian	Rugby Park, Kilmarnock
	McDonald 11'; McSwegan 24', 42', 47', 62'; Boyd 90' (pen.)		Murray 18'; Jack 83'	Attendance: 5,558; Referee: J Underhill

12 April 2003 SPL	Hibernian	2–2	Livingston	Easter Road, Edinburgh
	Orman 44'; Riordan 53'		Wilson 87'; O'Brien 89'	Attendance: 8,150; Referee: Rowbotham

26 April 2003 SPL	Dundee United	1–2	Hibernian	Tannadice Park, Dundee
	McCracken 32'		McManus 58' (pen.); Murray 90'	Attendance: 6,758; Referee: McCurry

3 May 2003 SPL	Hibernian	3–1	Aberdeen	Easter Road, Edinburgh
	Jack 42'; Riordan 61', 72'		Tiernan 88'	Attendance: 7,904; Referee: Richmond

10 May 2003 SPL	Hibernian	1–0	Motherwell	Easter Road, Edinburgh
	Brebner 66' (pen.)			Attendance: 7,809; Referee: Young

17 May 2003 SPL	Livingston	1–2	Hibernian	Almondvale, Livingston
	Pasquinelli 87'		Brown 38', 69'	Attendance: 5,423; Referee: Fyfe

24 May 2003 SPL	Hibernian	2–3	Partick Thistle	Easter Road, Edinburgh
	Jack 8'; Brown 34'		Britton 29'; Rowson 52'; Burns 86'	Attendance: 9,286; Referee: Underhill

=== Final table ===
Pos	Team	Pld	W	D	L	GF	GA	GD	Pts	Qualification or relegation (Note: Teams played each other three times (33 matches), before the league split into two groups (the top six and the bottom six) for the last five matches.)
5	Dunfermline Athletic	38	13	7	18	54	71	−17	46	
6	Dundee	38	10	14	14	50	60	−10	44	Qualification for the UEFA Cup first round (Note: As Rangers, the 2002–03 Scottish Cup winners, qualified for the UEFA Champions League via their league position, the place in the UEFA Cup was passed onto Dundee, the cup runners-up)
7	Hibernian	38	15	6	17	56	64	−8	51	
8	Aberdeen	38	13	10	15	41	54	−13	49	
9	Livingston	38	9	8	21	48	62	−14	35	

Source: Scottish Professional Football League
Rules for classification: 1) Points; 2) Goal difference; 3) Goals scored

== Scottish League Cup ==
As one of the SPL clubs who had not automatically qualified for European competition, Hibs entered at the last 32 stage (second round) of the competition, in which they defeated Alloa Athletic 2–0. Hibs were then drawn against Rangers, managed by former Hibs boss Alex McLeish, at home in the last 16. The match proved to be a "miserable night" for Hibs, as the tie was lost 3–2 despite taking an early lead. The lead was quickly turned into a deficit by an own goal and a defensive error by Derek Townsley. Despite Garry O'Connor's goal levelling the score midway through the second half, Rangers scored what proved to be the winning goal soon afterwards. Gary Smith was sent off late on, reducing Hibs to ten men. To top things off, midfielder Alen Orman had what appeared to be an epileptic seizure during the first half and had to be substituted.

=== Results ===
24 September 2002 Scottish League Cup	Alloa Athletic	0–2	Hibernian	Recreation Park, Alloa
			Brebner 59'; O'Connor 72'	Attendance: 1,842; Referee: McCurry

24 October 2002 Scottish League Cup	Hibernian	2–3	Rangers	Easter Road, Edinburgh
	Murray 6'; O'Connor 72'		Townsley 22' (o.g.); Caniggia 25'; Løvenkrands 78'	Attendance: 10,000; Referee: Dallas

== Scottish Cup ==
=== Results ===
25 January 2003 Scottish Cup	Dundee United	2–3	Hibernian	Tannadice Park, Dundee
	O'Donnell 70'; Hamilton 79' (pen.)		Brebner 10', 28', 87'	Attendance: 8,986; Referee: Brown

22 February 2003 Scottish Cup	Dunfermline Athletic	1–1	Hibernian	East End Park, Dunfermline
	Nicholson 58'		Murray 42'	Attendance: 6,619; Referee: Dougal

6 March 2003 Scottish Cup	Hibernian	0–2	Dunfermline Athletic	Easter Road, Edinburgh
			Crawford 57'; Wilson 79'	Attendance: 5,851; Referee: Dallas

== Transfers ==
During this period, Hibs were experiencing severe financial problems, due to a "collapse in television revenues". Hibs chairman Ken Lewandowski stated that the club's debt burden at the financial year end would be approximately £17M, and that the club could only continue to operate due to the support offered by majority shareholder Tom Farmer. At the end of the season, the club explored the possibility of selling Easter Road and sharing a new ground with Edinburgh derby rivals Hearts. During the summer of 2002, Hibs somewhat addressed these financial deficits by selling Ulises de la Cruz and Ulrik Laursen. De la Cruz was sold just one season after Hibs had bought him for a club record fee.

=== Players in ===
Player	From	Fee
(Finland) Mixu Paatelainen	RC Strasbourg	Free
(France) Yannick Zambernardi	Troyes AC	Free
(Hungary) Janos Matyus	Energie Cottbus	Free
(Sweden) Daniel Andersson	AIK	Free

=== Players out ===
Player	To	Fee
(Ecuador) Ulises de la Cruz	Aston Villa	£1,500,000
(Denmark) Ulrik Laursen	Celtic	£1,500,000
(Scotland) Mark Dempsie	St Mirren	Free
(England) Tony Caig	Newcastle United	Free
(Spain) Paco Luna	UD Almería	Free
(France) Frederic Daquin	FC Rouen	Free

=== Loans in ===
Player	From
(England) Craig James	Sunderland

=== Loans out ===
Player	To
(Scotland) Paul Hilland	Cowdenbeath
(Scotland) Derek Riordan	Cowdenbeath

== Player stats ==
During the 2002–03 season, Hibs used 30 different players in competitive games. The table below shows the number of appearances and goals scored by each player.

No.	Pos	Nat	Player	Total		SPL		Scottish Cup		League Cup	
No.	Pos	Nat	Player	Apps	Goals	Apps	Goals	Apps	Goals	Apps	Goals
	GK	(Sweden) SWE	Daniel Andersson	3	0	3	0	0	0	0	0
	GK	(England) ENG	Tony Caig	6	0	6	0	0	0	0	0
	GK	(Ireland) EIR	Nick Colgan	35	0	30	0	3	0	2	0
	DF	(Scotland) SCO	Allan Dempsie	2	0	2	0	0	0	0	0
	DF	(Scotland) SCO	Mark Dempsie	3	0	3	0	0	0	0	0
	DF	(France) FRA	Mathias Kouo-Doumbé	15	0	13	0	2	0	0	0
	DF	(Canada) CAN	Paul Fenwick	36	0	31	0	3	0	2	0
	DF	(England) ENG	Craig James	25	2	22	2	2	0	1	0
	DF	(Hungary) HUN	Janos Matyus	15	0	14	0	0	0	1	0
	DF	(Scotland) SCO	Gary Smith	37	0	32	0	3	0	2	0
	DF	(Scotland) SCO	Steven Whittaker	6	0	6	0	0	0	0	0
	DF	(France) FRA	Yannick Zambernardi	31	0	28	0	1	0	2	0
	MF	(France) FRA	Frederic Arpinon	9	0	8	0	1	0	0	0
	MF	(Scotland) SCO	Grant Brebner	37	7	32	3	3	3	2	1
	MF	(Germany) GER	Mathias Jack	21	3	19	3	2	0	0	0
	MF	(Scotland) SCO	Ian Murray	40	10	36	8	3	1	1	1
	MF	(Scotland) SCO	Kevin Nicol	1	0	1	0	0	0	0	0
	MF	(Scotland) SCO	John O'Neil	24	2	21	2	3	0	0	0
	MF	(Austria) AUT	Alen Orman	28	1	25	1	1	0	2	0
	MF	(Scotland) SCO	Alan Reid	7	0	7	0	0	0	0	0
	MF	(Scotland) SCO	Darran Thomson	2	0	2	0	0	0	0	0
	MF	(England) ENG	Derek Townsley	30	4	25	4	3	0	2	0
	MF	(Finland) FIN	Jarkko Wiss	27	0	24	0	1	0	2	0
	FW	(Scotland) SCO	Scott Brown	4	3	4	3	0	0	0	0
	FW	(France) FRA	Frederic Daquin	2	0	2	0	0	0	0	0
	FW	(Spain) ESP	Paco Luna	20	2	18	2	0	0	2	0
	FW	(Scotland) SCO	Tam McManus	39	11	35	11	3	0	1	0
	FW	(Scotland) SCO	Garry O'Connor	28	9	23	7	3	0	2	2
	FW	(Finland) FIN	Mixu Paatelainen	29	7	24	7	3	0	2	0
	FW	(Scotland) SCO	Derek Riordan	11	3	10	3	0	0	1	0

== See also ==
- List of Hibernian F.C. seasons
