= 2001–02 Hibernian F.C. season =

Hibernian
2001–02 season
- Chairman: Malcolm McPherson
- Manager: Alex McLeish (until 13 December 2001); Franck Sauzée (December 2001 – February 2002); Bobby Williamson (from February 2002)
- SPL: 10th
- Scottish Cup: R4
- League Cup: Semi
- UEFA Cup: R1
- Top goalscorer: League: O'Connor, 9 All: Luna, 10
- Highest home attendance: 14701
- Lowest home attendance: 7701
- Average home league attendance: 11603 (up 810)

Season 2001–02 was a turbulent one for Hibernian, as the team had three different permanent managers during the season. Alex McLeish left the club in December to manage Rangers; Hibs surprisingly replaced him with star player Franck Sauzée, who retired as a player when he was appointed manager. Sauzee's brief tenure saw a long winless run in the SPL and domestic cup defeats by Rangers and Ayr United. The winless run in the league dragged Hibs into the fringes of a relegation battle, and Sauzee was sacked after just 69 days in charge. Kilmarnock manager Bobby Williamson was hired as Sauzee's replacement, and a brief winning run averted any danger of relegation. Earlier in the season, Hibs had been knocked out of the UEFA Cup in the first round by AEK Athens, but only after a dramatic second leg at Easter Road that went to extra time.

== League season ==
Hibs began the 2001–02 league season in reasonable form, winning convincingly against Dunfermline Athletic and St Johnstone on successive Sundays in September. A poor run of one win in nine followed their elimination from the UEFA Cup, however, leaving Hibs in eighth place in the 12 team SPL. Nonetheless, manager Alex McLeish, who had guided Hibs to promotion back to the top flight in 1998–99, third place in 2000–01 and the 2001 Scottish Cup Final, was linked with the Rangers job when it was indicated that the incumbent, Dick Advocaat, would be moved to another role within that club. A few days later, McLeish was unveiled as Rangers manager, with Hibs and Rangers still negotiating over compensation. Donald Park managed the team on a caretaker basis for a 1–1 draw against Rangers the following day, and Franck Sauzee was swiftly appointed as manager two days later. Park was also promoted from the role of reserve team manager to assistant manager. BBC Sport commented:

the speed of the appointment will come as a surprise considering the Easter Road board only met on Thursday night with a view to drawing up a shortlist and because the Frenchman has no previous coaching experience.

Hibs were already on a poor run of form when Sauzee was appointed, and this was greatly extended during his time in charge. After just 69 days in the job, Sauzee was sacked by Hibs. Another factor appeared to be that the last place club, St Johnstone, had just won a game and reduced the gap between the clubs to nine points, with Hibs due to play the Perth club in their next game. Sauzee spoke to the media after his dismissal, insisting that he was not worried that Hibs may be relegated. Two days later, Hibs agreed a deal with Bobby Williamson to be the new manager, subject to compensation being agreed with Kilmarnock. In Williamson's first game in charge, the key match with St. Johnstone, Hibs won 3–0 and all but ensured their survival in the SPL. The result gave Hibs their first win in 19 SPL games, since an Edinburgh derby win in October. Despite the positive result, some of the Hibs supporters chanted Sauzee's name. The match reporter writing in The Observer reckoned that this was a sarcastic criticism of the Hibs board's decisions in hiring and then so quickly firing Sauzee. Further wins towards the end of the season meant that Hibs, although finishing in a lowly 10th, ended up 20 points ahead of St Johnstone.

=== Results ===
28 July 2001 SPL	Hibernian	2–2	Kilmarnock	Easter Road, Edinburgh
	Sauzee 39' (pen.); Laursen 82'		Ngonge 4'; Cocard 45'	Attendance: 12,717; Referee: Somers

4 August 2001 SPL	Dundee	2–1	Hibernian	Dens Park, Dundee
	Sara 9'; Caballero 62'		O'Neil 59'	Attendance: 9,447; Referee: Dallas

11 August 2001 SPL	Hibernian	2–0	Aberdeen	Easter Road, Edinburgh
	Sauzee 6' (pen.); McManus 45'			Attendance: 13,150; Referee: Rowbotham

18 August 2001 SPL	Rangers	2–2	Hibernian	Ibrox Stadium, Glasgow
	Hughes 26'; Flo 49'		McManus 19'; Orman 59'	Attendance: 45,540; Referee: Underhill

25 August 2001 SPL	Hibernian	1–4	Celtic	Easter Road, Edinburgh
	Fenwick 85'		Moravcik 16'; Sutton 17'; Sutton 20'; Larsson 31'	Attendance: 14,701; Referee: Clark

8 September 2001 SPL	Motherwell	1–3	Hibernian	Fir Park, Motherwell
	Kelly 15' (pen.)		Sauzee 17' (pen.), 50'; Fenwick 66'	Attendance: 5,784; Referee: Dougal

16 September 2001 SPL	Hibernian	5–1	Dunfermline Athletic	Easter Road, Edinburgh
	Brewster 18'; Brewster 32'; McManus 45'; Luna 73'; Luna 82'		Crawford 38'	Attendance: 11,035; Referee: Dallas

23 September 2001 SPL	Hibernian	4–0	St Johnstone	Easter Road, Edinburgh
	Luna 25'; Fenwick 57'; Brebner 59'; Smart 62'			Attendance: 10,404; Referee: McDonald

30 September 2001 SPL	Livingston	1–0	Hibernian	Almondvale, Livingston
	Quino 64'			Attendance: 10,016; Referee: Orr

13 October 2001 SPL	Dundee United	3–1	Hibernian	Tannadice Park, Dundee
	Hamilton 65'; Hamilton 71'; Griffin 84'		Brebner 4'	Attendance: 7,950; Referee: Underhill

21 October 2001 SPL	Hibernian	2–1	Heart of Midlothian	Easter Road, Edinburgh
	de la Cruz 1' de la Cruz 24'		Simmons 66'	Attendance: 13,774; Referee: McCurry

27 October 2001 SPL	Hibernian	1–2	Dundee	Easter Road, Edinburgh
	Brewster 45'		Rae 19'; Milne 90'	Attendance: 11,130; Referee: Young

3 November 2001 SPL	Kilmarnock	0–0	Hibernian	Rugby Park, Kilmarnock
				Attendance: 7,460; Referee: Brown

17 November 2001 SPL	Aberdeen	2–0	Hibernian	Pittodrie Stadium, Aberdeen
	Winters 90'; Zerouali 90'			Attendance: 12,226; Referee: Clark

24 November 2001 SPL	Hibernian	0–3	Livingston	Easter Road, Edinburgh
			Xausa 8'; Xausa 34'; Lowndes 86'	Attendance: 11,146; Referee: Fyfe

1 December 2001 SPL	Celtic	3–0	Hibernian	Celtic Park, Glasgow
	Hartson 11'; Hartson 40'; Lennon 72'			Attendance: 59,415; Referee: Young

8 December 2001 SPL	Hibernian	1–1	Motherwell	Easter Road, Edinburgh
	O'Neil 7'		Elliott 83'	Attendance: 11,158; Referee: Somers

12 December 2001 SPL	Rangers	1–1	Hibernian	Ibrox Stadium, Glasgow
	Ricksen 58'		Luna 22'	Attendance: 46,179; Referee: Rowbotham

15 December 2001 SPL	Dunfermline Athletic	1–0	Hibernian	East End Park, Dunfermline
	Nicholson 74'			Attendance: 6,617; Referee: McDonald

22 December 2001 SPL	St Johnstone	0–0	Hibernian	McDiarmid Park, Perth
				Attendance: 4,056; Referee: Toner

26 December 2001 SPL	Hibernian	0–3	Rangers	Easter Road, Edinburgh
			Moore 16'; Flo 85'; Arveladze 88' (pen.)	Attendance: 14,021; Referee: McCurry

29 December 2001 SPL	Heart of Midlothian	1–1	Hibernian	Tynecastle, Edinburgh
	McKenna 11'		O'Neil 90'	Attendance: 17,474; Referee: Dougal

2 January 2002 SPL	Hibernian	0–1	Dundee United	Easter Road, Edinburgh
			Paterson 87'	Attendance: 11,155; Referee: McDonald

12 January 2002 SPL	Dundee	1–0	Hibernian	Dens Park, Dundee
	Fan 66'			Attendance: 7,326; Referee: Somers

19 January 2002 SPL	Hibernian	2–2	Kilmarnock	Easter Road, Edinburgh
	Hurtado 11'; Fowler 63' (o.g.)		Johnson 65'; McGowne 90'	Attendance: 9,592; Referee: Clark

23 January 2002 SPL	Hibernian	3–4	Aberdeen	Easter Road, Edinburgh
	Luna 18'; Townsley 36'; Luna 68'		Dadi 17'; Winters 28'; Guntveit 48'; Mackie 90'	Attendance: 10,555; Referee: Dallas

2 February 2002 SPL	Hibernian	1–1	Celtic	Easter Road, Edinburgh
	O'Connor 21'		Hartson 50'	Attendance: 12,315; Referee: Freeland

9 February 2002 SPL	Motherwell	4–0	Hibernian	Fir Park, Motherwell
	Ferrere 53'; Ferrere 66'; Lehmann 73'; Ferrere 81'			Attendance: 5,367; Referee: Dougal

16 February 2002 SPL	Hibernian	1–1	Dunfermline Athletic	Easter Road, Edinburgh
	Townsley 79'		Hampshire 59'	Attendance: 9,788; Referee: McCurry

2 March 2002 SPL	Hibernian	3–0	St Johnstone	Easter Road, Edinburgh
	Murray 2'; Murray 37'; O'Connor 67'			Attendance: 13,731; Referee: Rowbotham

9 March 2002 SPL	Livingston	0–3	Hibernian	Almondvale, Livingston
			O'Connor 15'; O'Neil 45'; Petersen 78' (o.g.)	Attendance: 6,463; Referee: Toner

16 March 2002 SPL	Hibernian	1–2	Heart of Midlothian	Easter Road, Edinburgh
	O'Connor 5'		Severin 40'; Pressley 88' (pen.)	Attendance: 13,240; Referee: Young

23 March 2002 SPL	Dundee United	1–2	Hibernian	Tannadice Park, Dundee
	Thompson 77'		Arpinon 38'; O'Connor 73'	Attendance: 5,801; Referee: Toner

7 April 2002 SPL	Dundee United	2–1	Hibernian	Tannadice Park, Dundee
	Venetis 45'; Lilley 55'		O'Connor 65'	Attendance: 5,417; Referee: Brown

13 April 2002 SPL	Kilmarnock	1–0	Hibernian	Rugby Park, Kilmarnock
	Ngonge 18'			Attendance: 6,236; Referee: Somers

21 April 2002 SPL	Hibernian	4–0	Motherwell	Easter Road, Edinburgh
	Townsley 27'; Arpinon 45'; O'Connor 81'; O'Connor 85'			Attendance: 7,701; Referee: Freeland

27 April 2002 SPL	Hibernian	2–2	Dundee	Easter Road, Edinburgh
	Townsley 15'; O'Connor 76'		Caballero 33'; Milne 88'	Attendance: 8,852; Referee: Dougal

12 May 2002 SPL	St Johnstone	0–1	Hibernian	McDiarmid Park, Perth
			Townsley 43'	Attendance: 3,372; Referee: Thomson

=== Final table ===
Pos	Team	Pld	W	D	L	GF	GA	GD	Pts	Qualification or relegation (Note: Teams played each other three times (33 matches), before the league split into two groups (the top six and the bottom six) for the last five matches.)
8	Dundee United	38	12	10	16	38	59	−21	46	
9	Dundee	38	12	8	18	41	55	−14	44	
10	Hibernian	38	10	11	17	51	56	−5	41	
11	Motherwell	38	11	7	20	49	69	−20	40	
12	St Johnstone (R)	38	5	6	27	24	62	−38	21	Relegation to the First Division

Source: Scottish Professional Football League
Rules for classification: (1) Points; (2) Goal difference; (3) Goals scored
(R) Relegated

== UEFA Cup ==
Having finished third in the previous season's Scottish Premier League, Hibs entered the UEFA Cup at the first round stage. The first leg against AEK Athens was scheduled to be played on 13 September 2001, but this was postponed by UEFA in light of the terrorist attacks on 11 September. Given the lateness of the decision, many Hibs fans had already travelled to Greece and were left out of pocket without a match to attend. The team themselves were on the runway at Edinburgh Airport when the decision from UEFA was advised to them. UEFA announced later that day that the UEFA Cup games scheduled to be played on 13 September would instead be played on 20 September.

When the match was finally played, Hibs suffered a 2–0 defeat in the "disrespectful" atmosphere of the Nikos Goumas Stadium. The match reporter for The Scotsman observed that:

the minute’s silence before kick-off in memory of those murdered in the recent terrorist atrocities was sabotaged by those wild incumbents of the notorious skepasti – "the covered ones" – end of the stadium, who whistled and jeered throughout, and then burnt the stars and stripes for good measure.

Hibs appeared to miss the "calming influence" of Franck Sauzee, who had been injured in the preceding league match. Although AEK created few chances in the early proceedings, a penalty kick early in the second half gave them the lead. A second goal from a header by Nikolaidis and the lack of an away goal left Hibs facing a "formidable challenge" to progress.

Sauzee returned for the second leg at Easter Road, while AEK made a few changes. Hibs had the early pressure but failed to score until the 53rd minute, when Paco Luna headed in from close range. Hibs then pressed to bring the aggregate score level at 2–2, but again lost Sauzee to injury with 10 minutes remaining. Nonetheless, Hibs were level a minute later, with Luna again scoring. Hibs then had a great chance to win the tie in the last minute of normal time, but Luna headed wide from a de la Cruz cross. With the aggregate score level and no away goals scored by either side, the tie headed into extra time. AEK regrouped during the break before the extra periods, and Tsiartas scored early on from long range. This left Hibs needing two goals without reply to win the tie, given the away goals rule. Tsiartas then added another goal for AEK from a corner, leaving Hibs with almost no chance to progress. David Zitelli then scored what was effectively a consolation goal, but at least gave Hibs a win on the night. Despite exiting the competition, the second leg match is still fondly remembered by Hibs supporters; Dougray Scott later named it as his favourite match.

=== Results ===
20 September 2001 UEFA Cup	AEK Athens	2–0	Hibernian	Nikos Goumas Stadium, Athens
	Tsiartas 54' (pen.); Nikolaidis 66'			Attendance: 15,525; Referee: Hanacsek

27 September 2001 UEFA Cup	Hibernian	3–2 (a.e.t.) (3–4 agg.)	AEK Athens	Easter Road, Edinburgh
	Luna 52'; Luna 82'; Zitelli 114'		Tsiartas 92', 105'	Attendance: 16,647; Referee: Granat

== Scottish League Cup ==
As one of the SPL clubs who qualified for European competition, Hibs entered at the last 16 stage (third round) of the competition, in which they defeated Raith Rovers 2–0. Another 2–0 win, against Dundee United at Easter Road, sent Hibs through to the semi-final. By the time the semi-final was played, Alex McLeish had departed and Franck Sauzee was now the manager. The shock 1–0 defeat by First Division club Ayr United in the semi-final was cited as one of the causes of Sauzee's dismissal later that month.

=== Results ===
9 October 2001 Scottish League Cup	Raith Rovers	0–2	Hibernian	Stark's Park, Kirkcaldy
			Brewster 54'; Brewster 86'	Attendance: 4,601; Referee: McDonald

27 November 2001 Scottish League Cup	Hibernian	2–0	Dundee United	Easter Road, Edinburgh
	McManus 2'; Luna 61'			Attendance: 8,825; Referee: Toner

6 February 2002 Scottish League Cup	Hibernian	0–1 (a.e.t.)	Ayr United	Hampden Park, Glasgow
			Annand 101' (pen.)	Attendance: 11,779; Referee: McCurry

== Scottish Cup ==
Hibs' brief Scottish Cup campaign during 2001–02 came during the period that Franck Sauzee was manager. It transpired that the victory in the third round replay against Stranraer, a Second Division club, was to be Sauzee's only win as Hibs manager. Hibs were heavily defeated by Rangers, now managed by Alex McLeish, in the last 16.

=== Results ===
5 January 2002 Scottish Cup	Stranraer	0–0	Hibernian	Stair Park, Stranraer
				Attendance: 2,259; Referee: Young

15 January 2002 Scottish Cup	Hibernian	4–0	Stranraer	Easter Road, Edinburgh
	Luna 6'; Zitelli 15' (pen.); Smith 47'; Hurtado 88'			Attendance: 8,536; Referee: Young

26 January 2002 Scottish Cup	Rangers	4–1	Hibernian	Ibrox Stadium, Glasgow
	Flo 23'; Løvenkrands 45'; Flo 65'; Dodds 86'		Brebner 28'	Attendance: 25,636; Referee: Rowbotham

== Transfers ==
Hibs broke their transfer record during the 2001 close season with the purchase of Ecuadorian international player Ulises de la Cruz, paying £700,000 for his services. Hibs manager Alex McLeish later claimed that the fee was "more like" £350,000.

=== Players in ===
Player	From	Fee
(Ecuador) Ulises de la Cruz	LDU Quito	£700,000
(Austria) Alen Orman	Royal Antwerp	£100,000
(Spain) Paco Luna	Monterrey	Nominal fee
(Scotland) Derek Townsley	Motherwell	Free
(England) Tony Caig	Charlton Athletic	Free
(Scotland) Craig Brewster	Ionikos	Free
(France) Mathias Kouo-Doumbé	Paris Saint-Germain	Free
(Ecuador) Eduardo Hurtado	Argentinos Juniors	Free
(Scotland) Kevin Nicol	Raith Rovers	Free
(Finland) Jarkko Wiss	Stockport County	Free
(France) Lilian Martin	Marseille	Free

=== Players out ===
Player	To	Fee
(Germany) Dirk Lehmann	Brighton & Hove Albion	Free
(Scotland) Scott Bannerman	Greenock Morton	Free
(Trinidad and Tobago) Russell Latapy	Rangers	Free
(Australia) Stuart Lovell	Livingston	Free
(Finland) Mixu Paatelainen	RC Strasbourg	Free
(Scotland) Jamie Ewart	Brechin City	Free
(Scotland) Martin McIntosh	Rotherham United	£125,000
(France) Craig Brewster	Dunfermline Athletic	Free
(Ecuador) Eduardo Hurtado	Barcelona Sporting Club	Free
(Trinidad and Tobago) Lyndon Andrews	W Connection	Free
(France) David Zitelli	FC Istres	Free
(France) Lilian Martin	Retired	Free
(France) Franck Sauzee	Retired	Free
(Scotland) Liam O'Sullivan	Deceased	N/A

=== Loans in ===
Player	From
(Scotland) Allan Smart	Watford
(Scotland) Gary Caldwell	Newcastle United

=== Loans out ===
Player	To
(Scotland) Alan Reid	Greenock Morton
(Scotland) Martin McIntosh	Rotherham United

== Player stats ==
During the 2001–02 season, Hibs used 32 different players in competitive games. The table below shows the number of appearances and goals scored by each player.

No.	Pos	Nat	Player	Total		SPL		Scottish Cup		League Cup		UEFA Cup	
No.	Pos	Nat	Player	Apps	Goals	Apps	Goals	Apps	Goals	Apps	Goals	Apps	Goals
	GK	(England) ENG	Tony Caig	10	0	8	0	0	0	2	0	0	0
	GK	(Ireland) EIR	Nick Colgan	36	0	30	0	3	0	1	0	2	0
	DF	(Scotland) SCO	Gary Caldwell	12	0	11	0	0	0	1	0	0	0
	DF	(Scotland) SCO	Allan Dempsie	3	0	3	0	0	0	0	0	0	0
	DF	(Ecuador) ECU	Ulises de la Cruz	39	2	32	2	3	0	2	0	2	0
	DF	(Canada) CAN	Paul Fenwick	29	3	22	3	3	0	2	0	2	0
	DF	(Scotland) SCO	Paul Hilland	3	0	3	0	0	0	0	0	0	0
	DF	(Denmark) DEN	Ulrik Laursen	31	1	24	1	3	0	2	0	2	0
	DF	(France) FRA	Lilian Martin	1	0	1	0	0	0	0	0	0	0
	DF	(France) FRA	Franck Sauzee	11	4	10	4	0	0	0	0	1	0
	DF	(Scotland) SCO	Gary Smith	36	1	30	0	3	1	2	0	1	0
	DF	(Scotland) SCO	Steven Whittaker	1	0	1	0	0	0	0	0	0	0
	MF	(Trinidad and Tobago) TRI	Lyndon Andrews	2	0	2	0	0	0	0	0	0	0
	MF	(France) FRA	Frederic Arpinon	23	2	20	2	2	0	1	0	0	0
	MF	(Scotland) SCO	Grant Brebner	35	3	28	2	3	1	3	0	1	0
	MF	(Germany) GER	Mathias Jack	36	0	31	0	2	0	1	0	2	0
	MF	(Scotland) SCO	Ian Murray	40	2	32	2	3	0	3	0	2	0
	MF	(Scotland) SCO	Kevin Nicol	2	0	2	0	0	0	0	0	0	0
	MF	(Scotland) SCO	John O'Neil	38	4	32	4	1	0	3	0	2	0
	MF	(Austria) AUT	Alen Orman	36	1	30	1	1	0	3	0	2	0
	MF	(Scotland) SCO	Alan Reid	2	0	2	0	0	0	0	0	0	0
	MF	(England) ENG	Derek Townsley	22	5	18	5	3	0	1	0	0	0
	MF	(Finland) FIN	Jarkko Wiss	12	0	11	0	0	0	1	0	0	0
	FW	(Scotland) SCO	Craig Brewster	28	5	25	3	0	0	1	2	2	0
	FW	(France) FRA	Frederic Daquin	2	0	2	0	0	0	0	0	0	0
	FW	(Ecuador) ECU	Eduardo Hurtado	15	2	12	1	2	1	1	0	0	0
	FW	(Spain) ESP	Paco Luna	30	10	25	6	2	1	2	1	1	2
	FW	(Scotland) SCO	Tam McManus	26	4	21	3	1	0	2	1	2	0
	FW	(Scotland) SCO	Garry O'Connor	24	9	19	9	3	0	2	0	0	0
	FW	(Scotland) SCO	Derek Riordan	9	0	6	0	2	0	1	0	0	0
	FW	(Scotland) SCO	Allan Smart	5	1	5	1	0	0	0	0	0	0
	FW	(France) FRA	David Zitelli	27	2	21	0	2	1	2	0	2	1

== See also ==
- List of Hibernian F.C. seasons
