= Steven Whittaker =

Scottish association football player and coach

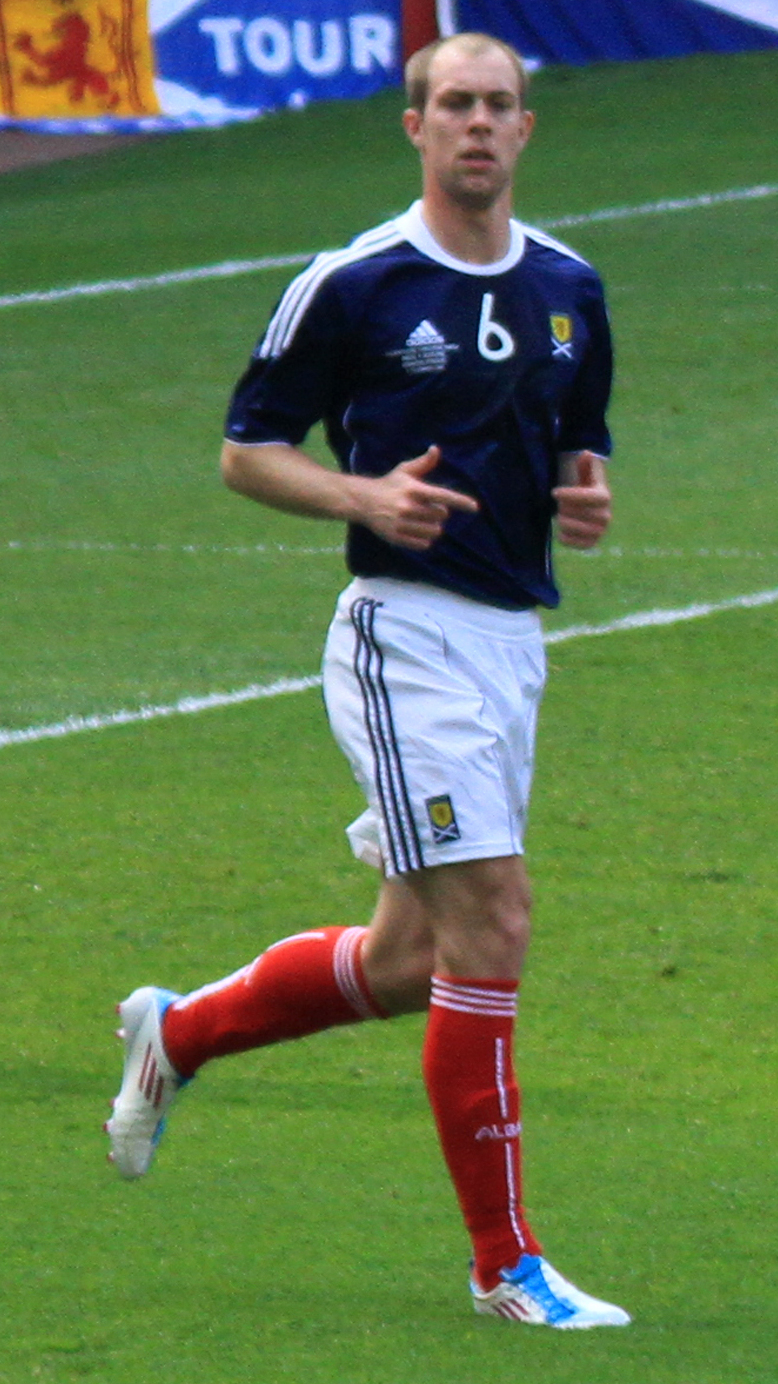
- Whittaker in 2011

Personal information
- Full name: Steven Gordon Whittaker
- Date of birth: 16 June 1984 (age 42)
- Place of birth: Edinburgh, Scotland
- Position: Defender

Team information
- Current team: Stirling Albion (manager)

Youth career
- Hutchison Vale
- 2000–2002: Hibernian

Senior career*
Years	Team	Apps	(Gls)
2002–2007	Hibernian	141	(4)
2007–2012	Rangers	150	(19)
2012–2017	Norwich City	90	(5)
2017–2020	Hibernian	48	(2)
2020–2021	Dunfermline Athletic	18	(0)
Total		447	(30)

International career
2004–2006	Scotland U21	18	(1)
2009–2016	Scotland	31	(0)

Managerial career
- 2021: Dunfermline Athletic (interim)
- 2026–: Stirling Albion
- * Club domestic league appearances and goals

Steven Gordon Whittaker (born 16 June 1984) is a Scottish football coach and former professional player, who is currently the manager of Stirling Albion. Whittaker played as a defender, primarily at right-back.

He began his senior career with Hibernian, making over 170 appearances during his first spell with the Easter Road club. Whittaker won the Scottish League Cup in 2007 before transferring to Rangers in August that year. During his time at Rangers, he won three Scottish Premier League titles, two Scottish Cups, and three Scottish League Cups.

In 2012, Whittaker joined Norwich City on a free transfer. After five years in England, he returned to Hibernian in 2017, then concluded his playing career with Dunfermline Athletic in the 2020–21 season.

Internationally, Whittaker earned 31 caps for the Scotland national football team between 2009 and 2016. He also represented the Scotland U21s earlier in his career.

Following retirement, Whittaker moved into coaching. He briefly served as interim manager of Dunfermline Athletic in 2021, then worked as an assistant coach under his former teammate Scott Brown at Fleetwood Town and Ayr United. Whittaker then became a manager in his own right with Stirling Albion.

== Club career ==
=== Hibernian ===
Despite being a boyhood Hearts fan, Whittaker joined Kenny Miller and Derek Riordan in signing for Hibernian from Hutchison Vale Boys Club.

He made his first-team debut for Hibernian on 12 May 2002, in a 1–0 win against St Johnstone. During the 2002–03 season, he made six additional appearances before establishing himself as a regular in the first team the following year. Initially lacking a fixed position, Whittaker struggled for form while being deployed at both right-back and in various midfield roles under manager Bobby Williamson.

He scored his first senior goal on 3 January 2004 in a 3–2 win against Partick Thistle. He was an unused substitute in Hibernian's defeat in the 2004 Scottish League Cup Final.

The appointment of Tony Mowbray as manager later in 2004 proved pivotal for Whittaker’s development. Mowbray established him as the team’s first-choice right-back, providing much-needed positional stability. As a result, Whittaker’s performances improved significantly, and he became a regular for the Scotland under-21s. He was also instrumental in helping Hibernian secure a third-place finish in the league.

Whittaker remained a key player under both Mowbray and his successor, John Collins, and was part of the team that won the 2007 League Cup. In total, he made 174 appearances in all competitions for Hibernian, scoring five goals.

=== Rangers ===
Whittaker completed a £2 million transfer to Rangers on 1 August 2007, signing a five-year contract. He was assigned the number 28 shirt and made his debut on 18 August 2007 against Falkirk in the Scottish Premier League, scoring the second goal in a 7–2 victory.

Initially used mainly as a left-back, Whittaker became the first-choice right-back following Alan Hutton’s transfer to Tottenham Hotspur in January 2008. On 10 April 2008, he scored Rangers’ second goal in a 2–0 away win over Sporting CP in the UEFA Cup quarter-final second leg, picking up the ball near the halfway line and "dancing through the Sporting defence" before finishing.

During the 2009–10 season, Whittaker switched to the number 16 shirt and scored 11 goals in all competitions, contributing to Rangers’ league and League Cup double. His increased goal tally was partly due to taking regular penalties.

In July 2011, Whittaker signed a new five-year contract with Rangers after the club rejected transfer bids from Turkish side Bursaspor. Later that month, during a UEFA Champions League qualifier against Malmö FF, he was sent off for throwing the ball at an opponent following a rough challenge.

In February 2012, Rangers entered administration and were later liquidated. Businessman Charles Green purchased the club’s assets and sought to transfer player contracts to a new corporate entity. Whittaker was among several players who objected to the move. According to PFA Scotland, players were entitled to become free agents if they did not consent to the transfer.

Explaining his decision, Whittaker stated in a press conference: "I'm 28 and I want to play at the top level for as much as I can. It doesn't look like Rangers will be in the SPL, and there's no European football. We owe no loyalty to the new club. There is no history there for us."

=== Norwich City ===
Whittaker signed for English Premier League club Norwich City on 30 June 2012, agreeing to a four-year deal. On 20 July, he received provisional international clearance from FIFA that allowed him to play while arbitration over his move from Rangers was ongoing.

Whittaker suffered an ankle injury during a pre-season friendly against Celtic, which caused him to miss the beginning of the 2012–13 Premier League season. Two months later, he described the injury as the worst of his career. He made his competitive debut for Norwich on 31 October, playing at right back in a 2–1 win against Tottenham Hotspur in the League Cup. He then made his league debut a few days later, again at right back, playing the full 90 minutes in a 1–0 win over Stoke City. After the match, Whittaker expressed his satisfaction at starting his Premier League career with a win. On 8 December 2012, he scored his first Premier League goal, assisted by Robert Snodgrass, in a 4–3 victory over Swansea City.

Whittaker scored in the opening match of the 2013–14 Premier League season against Everton. His initial shot struck the post, but he reacted quickly to score on the rebound. He also registered an assist, as his sliced shot fell kindly to debutant Ricky van Wolfswinkel, who headed in the equalizer. Although Norwich were relegated that season, Whittaker played regularly in the 2014–15 campaign as the club earned promotion back to the Premier League via the play-offs. He assisted one of the goals in the play-off final.

Whittaker received his first red card in a league match against Southampton in August 2015. He was booked for preventing Matt Targett from taking a throw-in, and three minutes later received a second yellow card for pulling the shirt of Dušan Tadić. Norwich went on to lose the match 3–0. Norwich were again relegated at the end of the 2015–16 season, and Whittaker saw reduced first-team action in the following campaign. In May 2017, Norwich announced he would leave the club upon the expiry of his contract.

=== Hibernian (second spell) ===
On 15 July 2017, Whittaker rejoined Hibernian on a three-year deal. He scored in his second league debut for Hibs, a 3–1 win against Partick Thistle on 5 August 2017.

A hip injury sidelined Whittaker during the latter part of the 2018–19 season.

Following the sacking of head coach Paul Heckingbottom in November 2019, Whittaker assisted caretaker manager Eddie May. After four months out of the team, Whittaker returned in January 2020, playing as a defensive midfielder in both matches of a Scottish Cup tie against Dundee United.

Whittaker was one of three first-team players released by Hibernian at the end of the 2019–20 season.

=== Dunfermline Athletic ===
Following his release from Hibernian, Whittaker signed a one-year contract with Scottish Championship club Dunfermline Athletic on 29 June 2020. The deal also included a coaching role with the club.

In June 2021, it was announced that Whittaker had retired from playing to take up a full-time coaching position with Dunfermline.

== International career ==
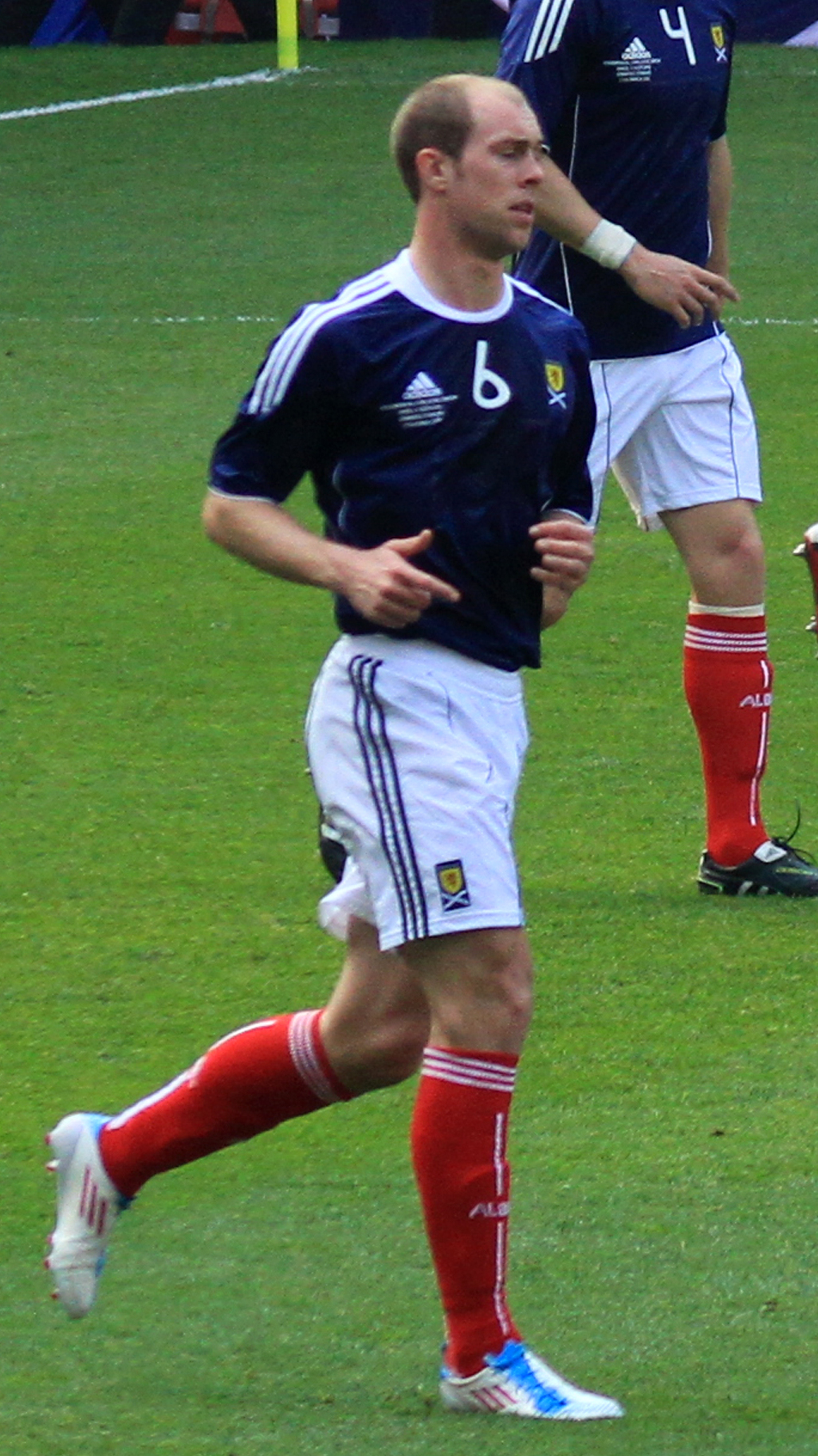
Whittaker playing for Scotland in 2011

Whittaker was a regular for the Scotland under-21 side. In October 2006, he was called up to the senior Scotland squad for a Euro 2008 qualifier against Ukraine, although he did not feature in the match.

He was later named in the Scotland B team for a match against a Republic of Ireland B side on 20 November 2007. Whittaker started the game and played 68 minutes before being replaced by Ross McCormack. He had also featured in a goalless draw between the two sides in November 2006.

Whittaker made his debut for the senior Scotland team on 12 August 2009 in a 4–0 defeat against Norway. His second cap came in a 2–0 win over Macedonia on 5 September 2009, when he replaced the injured Callum Davidson.

Whittaker earned 31 caps for Scotland, with his international career spanning from 2009 to March 2016. He was dropped from the squad after losing his place at Norwich City but was recalled in August 2017.

== Coaching career ==
Whittaker, who had been working as a coach at Dunfermline Athletic following his retirement as a player, was appointed joint interim manager—alongside Greg Shields—after the departure of Peter Grant in October 2021. Shields and Whittaker took charge of two matches before John Hughes was appointed as permanent manager.

On 13 May 2022, Whittaker joined Fleetwood Town as assistant manager under his former Hibernian and Scotland teammate Scott Brown. The pair were dismissed by the club in September 2023. They reunited at Ayr United in January 2024, with Brown taking over as manager and Whittaker again serving as his assistant.

Whittaker was appointed manager of Stirling Albion in May 2026.

== Career statistics ==
=== Club ===
As of 8 May 2021

Appearances and goals by club, season and competition
Club	Season	League			National Cup		League Cup		Other		Total	
Club	Season	Division	Apps	Goals	Apps	Goals	Apps	Goals	Apps	Goals	Apps	Goals
Hibernian	2001–02	Scottish Premier League	1	0	0	0	0	0	0	0	1	0
Hibernian	2002–03	Scottish Premier League	6	0	0	0	0	0	—		6	0
Hibernian	2003–04	Scottish Premier League	28	1	1	0	4	0	—		33	1
Hibernian	2004–05 (Note: Totals include match Vetra 1–0 Hibs. Whittaker started the match per the BBC match report, but his appearance is not recorded by soccerbase)	Scottish Premier League	37	1	4	1	2	0	2	0	45	2
Hibernian	2005–06	Scottish Premier League	34	1	4	0	0	0	2	0	40	1
Hibernian	2006–07	Scottish Premier League	35	1	6	0	4	0	4	0	49	1
Hibernian	Total		141	4	15	1	10	0	8	0	174	5
Rangers	2007–08 (Note: Totals include match Werder 1–0 Rangers. Whittaker was used as a substitute per the BBC match report, but it is not recorded by soccerbase.)	Scottish Premier League	30	4	6	0	3	0	9	1	48	5
Rangers	2008–09 (Note: Totals include both matches versus FBK Kaunas. Whittaker started both legs per the BBC match reports (1st leg)(2nd leg), but it is not recorded by soccerbase (1st leg); (2nd leg).)	Scottish Premier League	24	2	4	1	1	0	2	0	31	3
Rangers	2009–10	Scottish Premier League	35	7	5	3	4	1	6	0	50	11
Rangers	2010–11	Scottish Premier League	36	4	3	2	3	0	10	1	52	7
Rangers	2011–12	Scottish Premier League	25	2	0	0	1	0	2	0	28	2
Rangers	Total		150	19	18	6	12	1	29	2	209	28
Norwich City	2012–13	Premier League	13	1	0	0	1	0	—		14	1
Norwich City	2013–14	Premier League	20	1	2	0	3	1	—		25	2
Norwich City	2014–15	Championship	37	2	1	0	2	0	3	0	43	2
Norwich City	2015–16	Premier League	8	1	0	0	1	0	—		9	1
Norwich City	2016–17	Championship	12	0	1	1	2	0	2	0	17	1
Norwich City	Total		90	5	4	1	9	1	5	0	108	7
Hibernian	2017–18	Scottish Premiership	26	2	0	0	5	0	—		31	2
Hibernian	2018–19 (Note: Soccerbase did not record appearances made by Whittaker against NSI Runavik on 19 July and Asteras Tripolis on 26 July and 2 August 2018.)	Scottish Premiership	15	0	2	0	2	0	4	0	23	0
Hibernian	2019–20	Scottish Premiership	7	0	4	0	4	0	—		15	0
Hibernian	Total		48	2	6	0	11	0	4	0	69	2
Dunfermline Athletic	2020–21	Scottish Championship	18	0	1	0	3	0	2	0	24	0
Career total			447	30	44	8	45	2	48	2	584	42

=== International appearances ===
Scotland national team
Year	Apps	Goals
2009	4	0
2010	5	0
2011	5	0
2012	2	0
2013	7	0
2014	5	0
2015	2	0
2016	1	0
Total	31	0

=== Managerial statistics ===
As of match played on 14 November 2026

Managerial record by team and tenure
Team	From	To	Record				
Team	From	To	P	W	D	L	Win %
Dunfermline Athletic (Note: Joint caretaker manager with Greg Shields)	31 October 2021	15 November 2021	2	1	0	1	50.0
Stirling Albion	9 May 2026	Present	26	9	5	12	34.62
Total			28	10	5	13	35.7

== Honours ==
Hibernian

- Scottish League Cup: 2006–07

Rangers

- Scottish Premier League: 2008–09, 2009–10, 2010–11
- Scottish Cup: 2007–08, 2008–09
- Scottish League Cup: 2007–08, 2009–10, 2010–11
- UEFA Cup runner-up: 2007–08

Norwich City

- Football League Championship play-offs: 2015
