= Garry O'Connor =

Scottish association football player

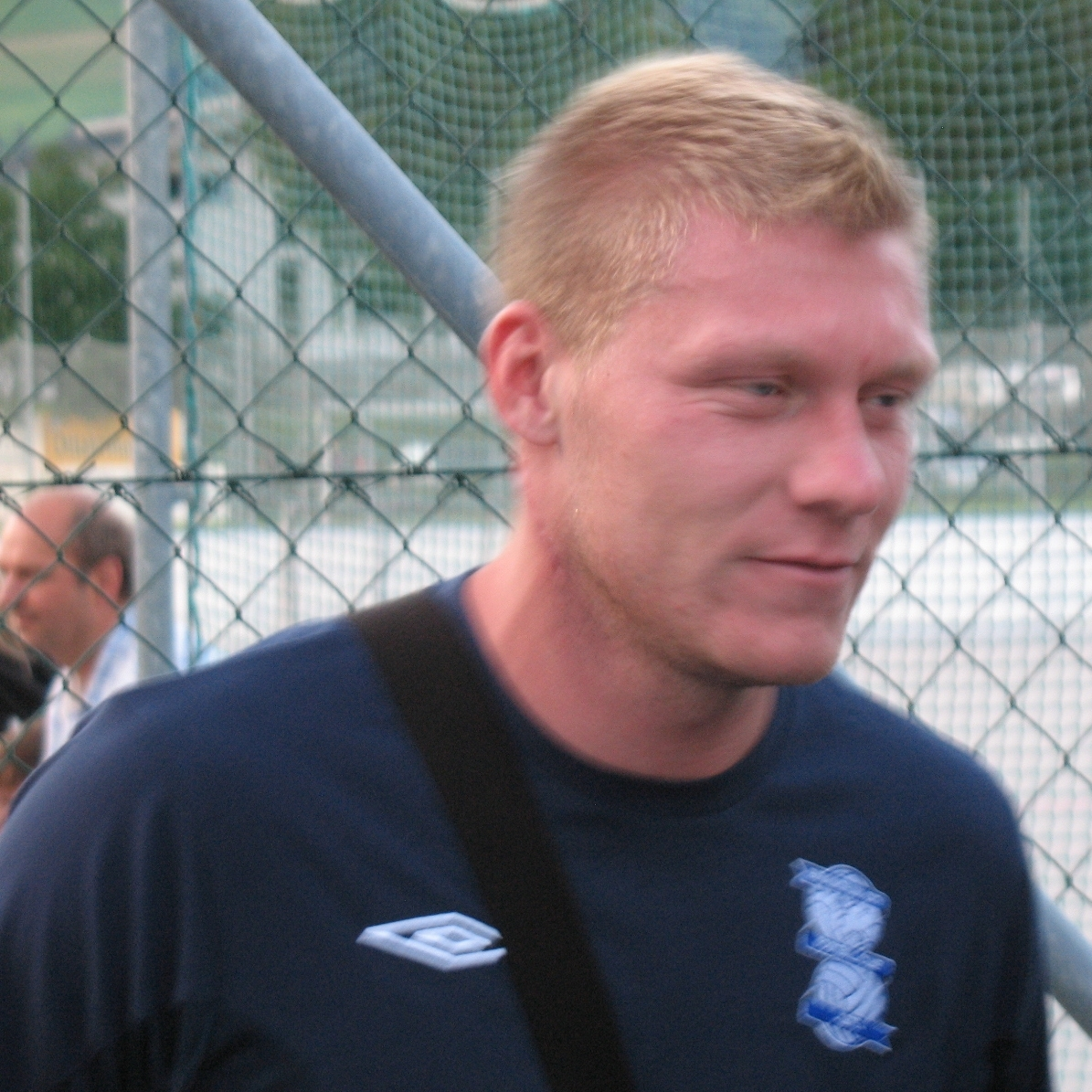
- O'Connor with Birmingham City in 2009

Personal information
- Full name: Garry Lawrence John O'Connor
- Date of birth: 7 May 1983 (age 43)
- Place of birth: Edinburgh, Scotland
- Height: 6 ft 1 in (1.86 m)
- Position: Striker

Youth career
- Granton Sports B.C.
- 1999–2000: Hibernian

Senior career*
Years	Team	Apps	(Gls)
2000–2006	Hibernian	138	(46)
2000	→ Peterhead (loan)	4	(1)
2006–2007	Lokomotiv Moscow	33	(7)
2007–2011	Birmingham City	52	(9)
2010	→ Barnsley (loan)	4	(1)
2010	→ Barnsley (loan)	5	(2)
2011	Barnsley	13	(1)
2011–2012	Hibernian	33	(12)
2012	Tom Tomsk	6	(1)
2014	Greenock Morton	11	(1)
2014–2016	Selkirk		(18)

International career
2004	Scotland U21	5	(2)
2002–2009	Scotland	16	(4)

Managerial career
- 2015–2016: Selkirk
- * Club domestic league appearances and goals

Garry Lawrence John O'Connor (born 7 May 1983) is a Scottish professional football manager and a former player. He played for Hibernian, Peterhead, Lokomotiv Moscow, Barnsley, Tom Tomsk, Birmingham City, Greenock Morton and represented Scotland.

O'Connor began his career with Hibernian, where his performances in 2002 earned him selection for Scotland as an 18-year-old, and he later earned a lucrative transfer to Lokomotiv Moscow. He scored a winning goal in the 2007 Russian Cup final for Lokomotiv. O'Connor struggled to settle in Russia, and he returned to the United Kingdom later that year by signing for Birmingham City. O'Connor struggled to hold a place in the Birmingham side due to injuries, and he spent most of the 2010–11 season with Barnsley. He then returned to Hibernian for the 2011–12 season, scoring 12 goals in 33 league appearances. O'Connor signed for Russian club Tom Tomsk in July 2012, but was released after making only six appearances.

== Club career ==
=== Hibernian (first spell) ===
Born in Edinburgh and raised in Port Seton in East Lothian, O'Connor's early mentor in football was his uncle Mark, who was killed after being struck by a car when O'Connor was 14. A Hibernian youth graduate, he made his debut for the club under manager Alex McLeish in April 2001 as a substitute against Dundee, his only appearance that season. O'Connor made just four appearances before Christmas in the following season. After the departure of McLeish to Rangers and the appointment of new manager Franck Sauzée, O'Connor featured more regularly in the first team. He scored his first goal for the club in a 1–1 draw with Celtic in February 2002. Although Sauzée was sacked later that month, O'Connor continued to feature in the first team under Sauzée's successor Bobby Williamson. O'Connor went on to score a further seven goals that season, including goals in five consecutive games between March and April.

Following two seasons in which he struggled to fulfil his early promise, the arrival of manager Tony Mowbray at Hibs in May 2004 led to improved form for both O'Connor and the team as a whole, as Hibs finished third in the 2004–05 Scottish Premier League. O'Connor formed a formidable partnership with Derek Riordan, and between them they scored 42 goals that season, as Hibs earned qualification for the UEFA Cup.

=== Lokomotiv Moscow ===
On 26 February 2006, it was reported that O'Connor was set to join Lokomotiv Moscow for approximately £1.6 million. This offer was subsequently accepted by Hibernian, with Tony Mowbray conceding that the personal terms on offer, a reported weekly wage of £16,000, were "life-changing for Garry and his family". On 6 March, it was announced that the transfer had been agreed. O'Connor scored a total of 58 goals for Hibs in all competitions and scored in his final Hibs appearance, against Falkirk in the Scottish Cup. He donated his portion of the transfer fee to the club to fund their training facilities.

On 22 March 2006, O'Connor scored for the first time for Lokomotiv Moscow, the opening goal in a 2–2 draw with Spartak Moscow in a Russian Cup tie. He opened the scoring for his side against Torpedo Moscow in a 4–1 win on 14 May. In the 2006 season, he scored seven league goals and a cup goal in the 29 matches he played in (although only on the field for the full 90 minutes in five matches – he averaged 58 minutes of playing time per match), and was yellow-carded once. In Moscow he formed a partnership with Russian international Dmitry Sychev, although Dramane Traoré, the Mali international, threatened his position.

On 27 May 2007, O'Connor came off the bench to score the winning goal for Lokomotiv Moscow in the 2006–07 Russian Cup Final against city rivals FC Moscow. The extra-time goal, coming in the 109th minute, was enough to seal a 1–0 victory for the railway team, and provided a measure of redemption for O'Connor, who had struggled to settle in Russia for family reasons.

=== Birmingham City ===
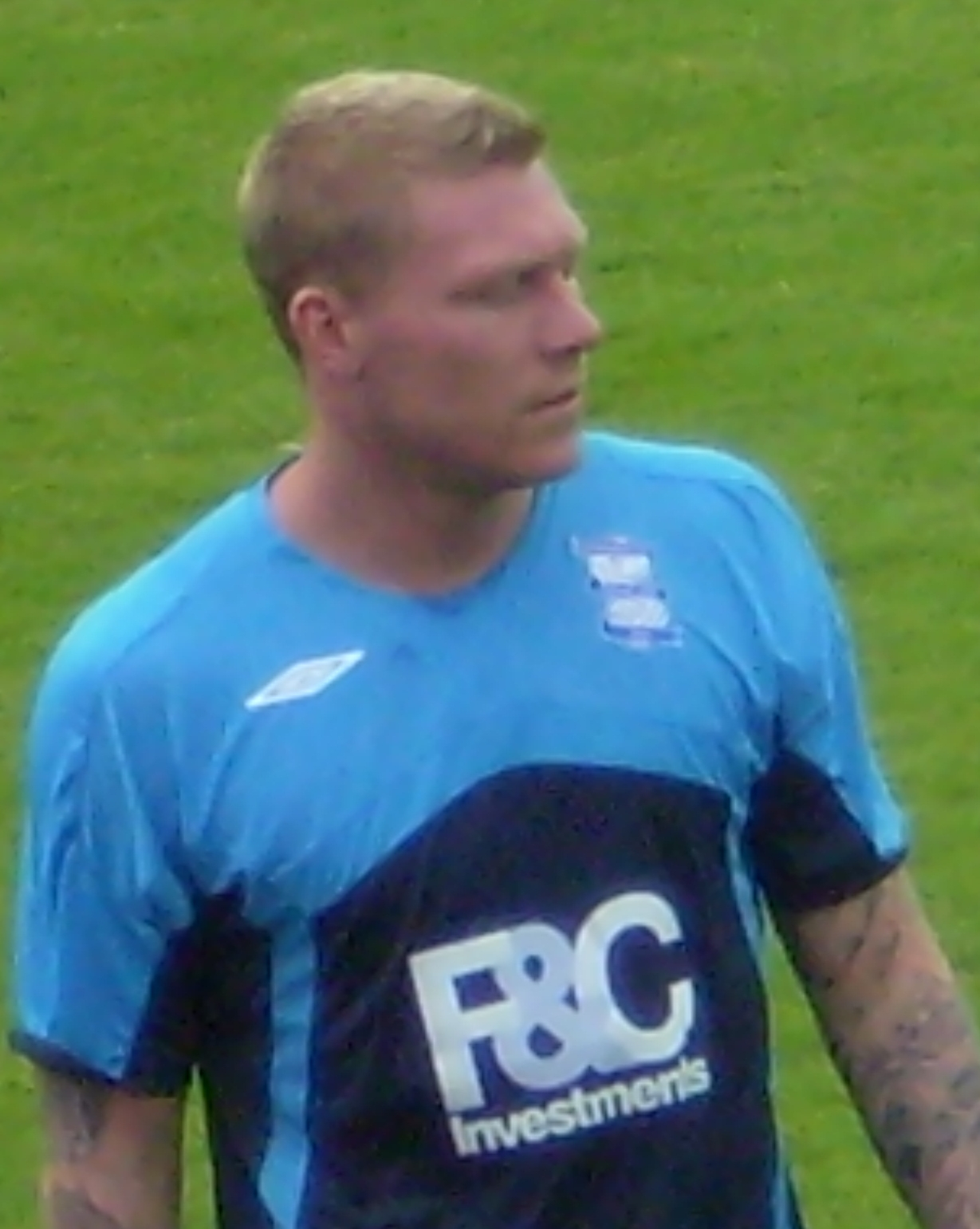
O'Connor with Birmingham City in 2009

O'Connor completed a £2.7 million move to Birmingham City on 28 June 2007, and scored his first goal for the club on his first appearance, on 15 August 2007 against Sunderland in a 2–2 draw. However, he lost his place, and manager Alex McLeish told him he needed to get fitter to return to the starting eleven. He had to wait until January 2008 for his second league goal, an equaliser against Arsenal. He missed several games in early 2008 through illness, and McLeish told him to "write the season off and come back this season all guns blazing".

O'Connor worked with a fitness coach over the summer, lost weight, and returned to training with a positive attitude towards the coming season and towards his manager. He had a successful pre-season and started well in the Championship with an assist for Kevin Phillips followed by scoring three goals in three games, but then sustained a groin injury. Returning to the team a month later, he produced some good performances and scored three more goals in two games, prompting his inclusion in the Championship Team of the Week, before again injuring his groin, this time in the pre-match warm-up at Queens Park Rangers on 29 October 2008, a match which Birmingham went on to lose. He returned to first-team action against Doncaster on 14 March 2009, and his goal on 6 April that confirmed a 2–0 win over Championship leaders Wolverhampton Wanderers for a Birmingham side reduced to ten men was voted as the club's Moment of the Season.

O'Connor missed most of the 2009–10 season after undergoing two operations on a hip injury. McLeish suggested that the injury dated back to O'Connor's time with Hibernian and had been aggravated by playing on synthetic pitches in Russia while he was with Lokomotiv Moscow. A Channel 4 documentary Dispatches, aired in September 2011, claimed that O'Connor had been sidelined due to failing a drugs test. His contract had been due to expire at the end of the season, but the club extended it for six months to give him a chance to prove his fitness.

=== Barnsley ===
To regain match fitness, O'Connor signed Championship club Barnsley on 10 September 2010 on a month's loan. He scored on his debut in a 5–2 win against Leeds United. Although Birmingham were happy for the player to remain at Barnsley, whose manager wanted to extend the loan, budgetary considerations made it impossible. Though O'Connor returned to Birmingham's first team, Cameron Jerome's recovery from injury left the player again looking for regular football, so in November he rejoined Barnsley for another month. His 89th-minute winning goal at Preston North End on his second Barnsley debut secured the club's first away win since February. O'Connor then scored the third Barnsley goal in a 3–1 win at Ipswich Town. O'Connor then signed on a permanent basis with Barnsley, from 1 January 2011 until the end of the 2010–11 season. He scored only once in 13 appearances, and his contract was cancelled by mutual consent in April 2011.

=== Later career ===
O'Connor re-signed for Hibernian on a one-year contract on 15 June 2011. He scored his first goal in his second spell with the club in their second match of the 2011–12 season, a 92nd-minute winner away to Inverness. Hibs had never previously won at the Caledonian Stadium. O'Connor made an excellent start to the season, scoring 10 goals in his first 11 appearances. This form meant that O'Connor was the subject of transfer speculation in January 2012, but injuries restricted his appearances. O'Connor was rested from matches and given additional training to improve his level of fitness. He responded by scoring in three consecutive matches, which helped to earn four league points and a place in the 2012 Scottish Cup Final. Hibs retained their place in the SPL, but then lost to Hearts in the cup final. O'Connor's contract with Hibs expired on 1 June 2012; on the same day, he was found guilty on charges of possessing cocaine and obstructing a police officer.

O'Connor returned to Russian football in July 2012, when he signed a two-year contract with FC Tom Tomsk. He was initially unable to play for the club, which was subject to a registration ban because of its failure to pay debts to players. O'Connor made his debut appearance for the club on 6 August, but was sent off after 65 minutes in the match against Baltika Kaliningrad. He was released from his contract in December 2012, having made just six appearances and scored once; he later stated that he and other players had not been paid by the club for several months.

O'Connor returned to Scottish football on 6 January 2014, agreeing a contract with Greenock Morton until the end of the 2013–14 season. He left Morton at the end of the season, having scored only one goal as they were relegated to League One. O'Connor signed a one-year contract with Lowland League club Selkirk on 1 August 2014. He scored 18 Lowland League goals in the 2014–15 season, 21 in all competitions; he then re-signed with Selkirk for the 2015–16 season.

== International career ==
Scotland national team manager Berti Vogts gave O'Connor his international debut, against South Korea in May 2002. He was then relegated to the Scotland under-21 squad for a few seasons as he struggled to find his best form. Improved form in the 2004–05 season earned him a recall to the full squad, and he scored his first Scotland goal in a 2–2 draw with Austria in August 2005.

After featuring in the 1–0 victory against France at Hampden Park on 7 October 2006, O'Connor and the rest of the team were given an evening off before reconvening ahead of the trip to Ukraine for another qualifying match. O'Connor failed to rejoin the squad and was axed from the travelling party by manager Walter Smith. O'Connor subsequently issued an apology through his agent without revealing the exact cause of his failure to appear, while assistant manager Tommy Burns announced that O'Connor was unlikely to be frozen out of the squad permanently. O'Connor said that his wife was unhappy with life in Moscow and he had decided to stay with her rather than return to training.

He was recalled to the Scotland squad in May 2007 under new manager, and his former boss at Hibs, Alex McLeish. Initially drafted in due to squad call-offs, O'Connor was given a place in the starting line-up for the friendly match with Austria and scored the only goal of the game. Seven days later, he scored in the 2–0 UEFA Euro 2008 qualifying victory over the Faroe Islands. After appearing against Ukraine in October 2007, O'Connor was left out of the Scotland squad for almost two years, was recalled for the matches in September 2009 against Macedonia and the Netherlands after Kevin Kyle withdrew due to injury.

== Coaching career ==
On 28 October 2015, O'Connor was appointed as Selkirk caretaker manager following the sacking of Steve Forrest, a role he continued until the appointment of Ian Fergus.

== Personal life ==
In August 2020, a documentary entitled "Playing the Game- Garry O'Connor" aired on BBC Scotland. The programme charted O'Connor's career and explored his troubles with substance abuse, mental health issues and early retirement from football. Whilst being interviewed for the programme, O'Connor revealed that he had considered suicide towards the end of his playing career, citing the love of his family and his responsibility towards his three children as motivation for seeking help through mental health counselling. O'Connor lost the fortune he made as a footballer, and had to move out of his mansion and into a council house.

His son Josh is also a footballer, who plays in the same position. Josh signed a first professional contract with Hibernian in January 2021, made his first team debut in March 2022, and as of July 2025 is at Elgin City.

== Career statistics ==
=== Club ===
Appearances and goals by club, season and competition
Club	Season	League			National cup (Note: Includes Scottish Cup, Russian Cup, FA Cup)		League cup (Note: Includes Scottish League Cup, Football League Cup)		Other		Total	
Club	Season	Division	Apps	Goals	Apps	Goals	Apps	Goals	Apps	Goals	Apps	Goals
Hibernian	2000–01	Scottish Premier League	1	0	0	0	0	0	—		1	0
Hibernian	2001–02	Scottish Premier League	19	9	3	0	2	0	0	0	24	9
Hibernian	2002–03	Scottish Premier League	23	7	3	0	2	2	—		28	9
Hibernian	2003–04	Scottish Premier League	33	5	1	0	5	2	—		39	7
Hibernian	2004–05	Scottish Premier League	36	14	4	3	1	1	2 (Note: Appearances in UEFA Intertoto Cup)	1	43	19
Hibernian	2005–06	Scottish Premier League	26	11	3	3	1	0	2 (Note: Appearances in UEFA Cup)	0	32	14
Hibernian	Total		138	46	14	6	11	5	4	1	167	58
Peterhead (loan)	2000–01	Scottish Second Division	4	1	0	0	—		1 (Note: Appearance in Scottish League Challenge Cup)	0	5	1
Lokomotiv Moscow	2006	Russian Premier League	24	7	3	1	—		2	0	29	8
Lokomotiv Moscow	2007	Russian Premier League	9	0	5	3	—		—		14	3
Lokomotiv Moscow	Total		33	7	8	4	—		2	0	43	11
Birmingham City	2007–08	Premier League	23	2	1	1	2	1	—		26	4
Birmingham City	2008–09	Championship	16	6	0	0	2	1	—		18	7
Birmingham City	2009–10	Premier League	10	1	0	0	2	0	—		12	1
Birmingham City	2010–11	Premier League	3	0	—		2	0	—		5	0
Birmingham City	Total		52	9	1	1	8	2	0	0	61	12
Barnsley	2010–11	Championship	22	4	1	0	—		—		23	4
Hibernian	2011–12	Scottish Premier League	33	12	4	1	3	3	0	0	40	16
Tom Tomsk	2012–13	Russian National League	6	1	—		—		—		6	1
Greenock Morton	2013–14	Scottish Championship	11	1	—		—		—		11	1
Career total			299	81	28	12	22	10	7	1	356	104

=== International ===
Appearances and goals by national team and year
National team	Year	Apps	Goals
Scotland	2002	3	0
Scotland	2003	0	0
Scotland	2004	0	0
Scotland	2005	4	1
Scotland	2006	2	1
Scotland	2007	6	2
Scotland	2008	0	0
Scotland	2009	1	0
Total		16	4

Scores and results list Scotland's goal tally first; score column indicates score after each O'Connor goal.

List of international goals scored by Garry O'Connor
No.	Date	Venue	Opponent	Score	Result	Competition	Ref.
1	17 August 2005	Graz, Austria	Austria	2–0	2–2	Friendly	
2	2 September 2006	Glasgow, Scotland	Faroe Islands	6–0	6–0	UEFA Euro 2008 qualifying	
3	30 May 2007	Vienna, Austria	Austria	1–0	1–0	Friendly	
4	6 June 2007	Toftir, Faroe Islands	Faroe Islands	2–0	2–0	UEFA Euro 2008 qualifying	

== Honours ==
Lokomotiv Moscow

- Russian Cup: 2006–07
