= Grant Brebner =

Scottish footballer (born 1977)

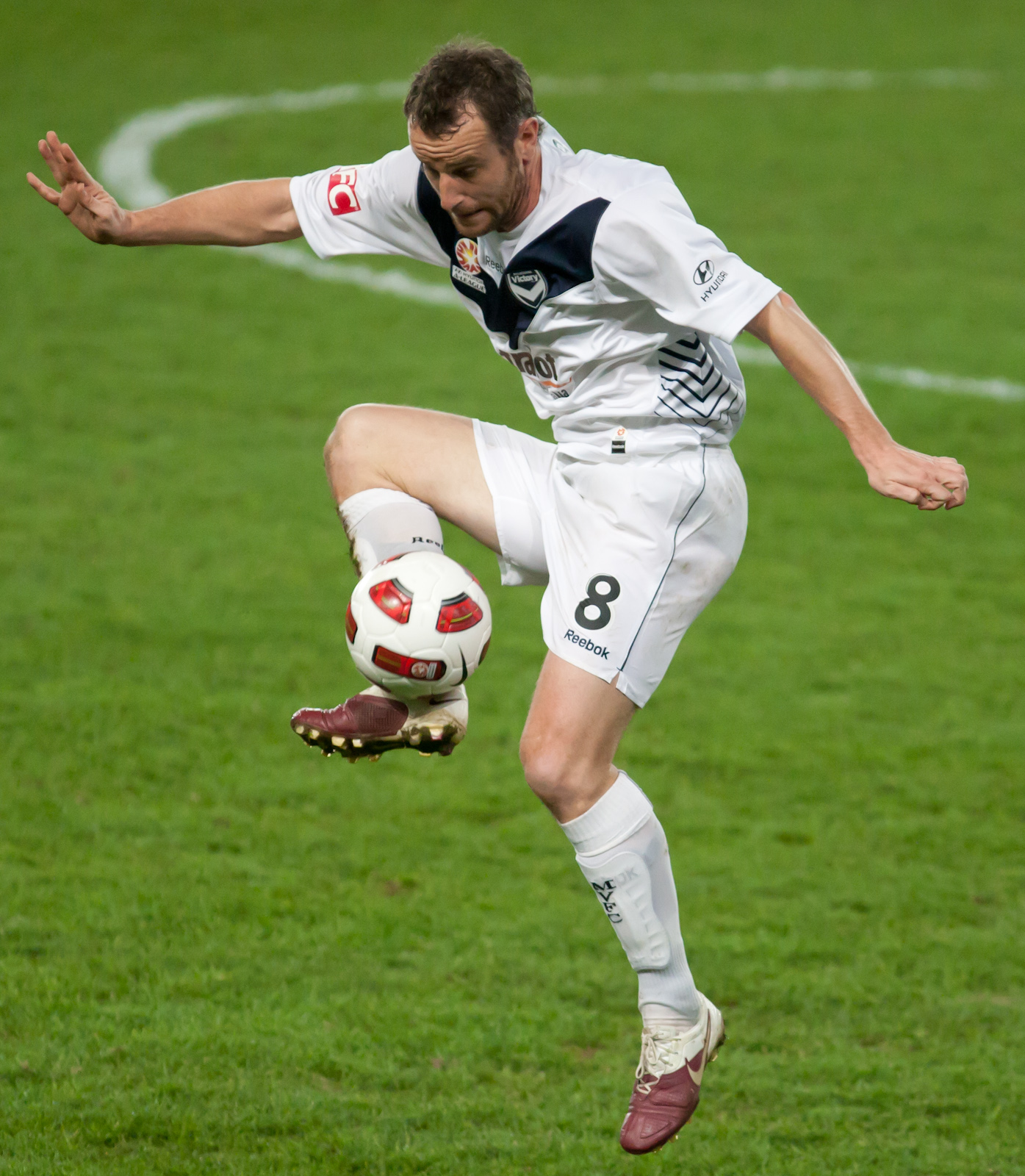
- Brebner playing for Melbourne Victory

Personal information
- Full name: Grant Ian Brebner
- Date of birth: 6 December 1977 (age 48)
- Place of birth: Edinburgh, Scotland
- Position: Defensive midfielder

Youth career
- –1994: Hutchison Vale
- 1994–1998: Manchester United

Senior career*
Years	Team	Apps	(Gls)
1998	Manchester United	0	(0)
1998	→ Cambridge United (loan)	6	(1)
1998	→ Hibernian (loan)	9	(1)
1998–1999	Reading	41	(10)
1999–2004	Hibernian	123	(6)
2000–2001	→ Stockport County (loan)	6	(0)
2004–2006	Dundee United	60	(6)
2006–2012	Melbourne Victory	120	(6)
2012	Moreland Zebras	9	(0)

International career
1997–1999	Scotland U21	17	(1)

Managerial career
- 2012: Moreland Zebras
- 2013–2014: Richmond SC
- 2015–2020: Melbourne Victory FC Youth (assistant)
- 2020: Melbourne Victory (caretaker)
- 2020–2021: Melbourne Victory
- * Club domestic league appearances and goals

Grant Ian Brebner (born 6 December 1977) is a Scottish football coach and former player who was the head coach at Australian side Melbourne Victory. Born in Edinburgh, Brebner joined Manchester United as a 16-year-old in 1994. While at Manchester United, he broke into the Scotland under-21 team, making 17 appearances between 1997 and 1999; however, he was unable to find a place in the Manchester United first team and was loaned out to Cambridge United and Hibernian, before being sold to Reading for £300,000 in 1998. He then returned to Hibernian on a permanent basis, and made more than 100 appearances in a five-year stint there that included a loan spell with Stockport County. In August 2004, he was transferred to Dundee United, before moving to Australia to play for Melbourne Victory. After six years with Melbourne Victory, he joined Victorian Premier League side Moreland Zebras. He returned to Melbourne Victory as an assistant coach in 2020, before assuming the position of manager later that year, where he served until being dismissed from the position in April 2021.

== Club career ==
=== Early career ===
On leaving school in 1994, Brebner signed for Manchester United as an apprentice, playing in the FA Youth Cup winning side of 1995 and turning professional soon after. FourFourTwo magazine hailed him as the latest big talent to be produced by Manchester United's youth system.

After four years in United's youth and reserve teams, Brebner was loaned to Cambridge United, where he scored his first senior goal while making six appearances. A further loan spell was spent back in Edinburgh at Hibernian (a team he grew up supporting), where Brebner suffered relegation at the end of the 1997–98 season. Despite the club's relegation, manager Alex McLeish praised his performance, due to "his composure and awareness in matches and has good attitude".

Brebner was then transferred permanently to Reading at the start of the 1998–99 season. He was already 21 years old, but had never played a single first-team game for Manchester United. During his time at Reading, he scored 10 goals in 41 league games. He was also responsible for scoring the first ever goal at the Madejski Stadium, but he suffered from homesickness during his time at the club.

=== Hibernian ===
After just one season with Reading, Brebner returned to Hibernian on a permanent deal for a worth cost £400k and signing a five–year contract. His first game after signing for the club on a permanent basis came on 21 August 1999, in a 1–1 draw against St Johnstone. He quickly became a first team regular for the club, playing in a midfield position. Brebner's first goal after signing for the club on a permanent basis came on 29 January 2000, in a 4–1 win against Dunfermline Athletic in the third round of the Scottish FA Cup. In his first season back at Hibernian, he made thirty–three appearances and scoring once in all competitions.

Having been dropped in the first team at the start of the 2000–01 season, Brebner moved on loan again to Stockport County. However, he suffered a cartilage injury that affected his time at Stockport County for two months and made six appearances for the side. Upon returning to Hibernian, Brebner re–established himself in the Hibs first team, playing in the 2001 Scottish Cup Final and the UEFA Cup.

During the 2001–02 season, Brebner scored three times for Hibernian, as the season was an improvement for him. Despite facing a tough start under the new management of Bobby Williamson, he continued to remain in the first team for the club. Brebner went on to score seven goals in the 2002–03 season, including a hat-trick against future employers Dundee United in a Scottish Cup match on 25 January 2003.

In his final season at Hibernian, Brebner was latterly club captain at Hibs, and was a senior player in the side with young stars like Kevin Thomson and Scott Brown. In the Edinburgh derby on 17 August 2003, he received a straight red card for a foul on Robert Sloan, in a 1–0 win. The club appealed for Brebner's red card to be overturned by the Scottish Football Association, which was successful after a review. He scored two more goals for Hibernian, including a 2–1 win against Celtic on 18 November 2003. However in a Scottish Cup match against Rangers on 10 January 2004, Brebner suffered an injury in the 12th minute, and was substituted, as the club lost 2–0. After being sidelined for three months, he returned to the starting line–up, in a 1–0 win against Dundee on 1 May 2004. By the time Brebner left Hibernian, he made four appearances for the club in the 2004–05 season.

=== Dundee United ===
Brebner was surprisingly transferred to Dundee United in August 2004, despite having just signed a three-year contract with Hibs.

He made his debut for the club, starting the whole game, in a 2–1 win against Inverness Caledonian Thistle on 28 August 2004. Brebner became a first team regular for Dundee United, playing in the central midfield position. He then scored three goals for the club throughout the 2004–05 season, including a last minute winner against Hearts on 16 April 2005. Brebner was featured in the Scottish Cup final, as Dundee United lost 1–0 against Celtic. He missed just three matches in his first season with the club and went on to make forty appearances and scoring three times in all competitions.

At the start of the 2005–06 season, Brebner started the season well when he scored two late goals, in a 5–4 win against Motherwell on 20 August 2005. Brebner scored again three weeks later on 10 September 2005, in a 2–1 loss against his former club, Hibernian. However, he suffered injuries on two occasions throughout the 2005–06 season and went on to make twenty–eight appearances and scoring four times in all competitions. Following a change in management at the club, however, Brebner was informed by his new manager Craig Brewster in April 2006 that he would be allowed to leave the club at the end of the 2005–06 season. By the time Brebner left Dundee United, he scored seven times from 64 appearances in all for the club.

=== Melbourne Victory ===
On 26 May 2006, Brebner was reported by BBC Sport to be attracting interest from Melbourne Victory. He subsequently flew to Australia for talks with the A-League club. Brebner came on as a trialist and scored for Victory with seconds remaining, in the QNI North Queensland Challenge Trophy game versus Central Coast Mariners on 18 June 2006. Securing a 2–2 draw, Brebner then scored the winning penalty to seal a 4–2 shoot-out win. On Brebner's performance, Victory manager Ernie Merrick said: "There's not too much more you can do when you're on trial than come in and win the game, is there?". In Victory's second match on 20 June 2006, Brebner completed the full 90 minutes, playing in a 3–1 win over Chinese team Changchun Yatai. Brebner completed a successful trial period by netting a 28-yard free-kick as Victory won the trophy with a 6–1 win over the Chinese team in the final, on 24 June. On the back of his impressive displays during his trial, he was signed to a full-time contract with the Melbourne Victory, having agreed on a deal to be released from his Dundee United contract.

He made his debut for the club, starting the whole game, in a 2–0 win against Adelaide United in the opening game of the season. Brebner scored his first goal for Melbourne Victory, in what turned out to be a late winner, in a 1–0 win against Perth Glory on 9 November 2006. He helped the club win the 2006–07 A-League premiership with five rounds remaining. The round 19 clash with Perth Glory away at Members Equity Stadium saw Brebner take the captain's armband for the first time in the absence of regular captain Kevin Muscat and vice-captain Archie Thompson, as Melbourne Victory drew 2–2. In the A-League Grand Final against Adelaide United, he helped the club win 6–0 to win the final. In his first season, Brebner became a first team regular for Melbourne Victory throughout the 2006–07 season, making twenty–one appearances and scoring once in all competitions.

However in the 2007–08 season, Brebner had a forgettable season when he suffered a groin injury and didn't play for the rest of the season, making fourteen appearances in all competitions. The start of the 2008–09 season saw Brebner making a recovery from his groin injury. He later regained his first team place throughout the 2008–09 season. Brebner scored the last of the five goals against Newcastle Jets in round 3 of the 2008–09 season, his first goal in three years. His second goal for the club came on 4 October 2008, in a 4–0 win against Perth Glory. On 15 December 2008, he signed a one–year contract extension with Melbourne Victory. Brebner helped the club win both A-League premiership and A-League Grand Final for the second in his Melbourne Victory's career, having previously set his aim to win it. At the end of the 2008–09 season, he made twenty appearances and scoring two times in all competitions. Following this, Brebner received Australian residency status at the start of 2009, which meant he no longer counted towards the Victory's overseas player quota.

Throughout the 2009–10 season, Brebner continued to be involved in the first team for Melbourne Victory. He scored his first goal of the season, in a 2–0 win against Adelaide United on 18 September 2009. However, during a 4–0 win against Gold Coast United on 28 November 2009, Brebner suffered ankle injury and was substituted in the 42nd minute. Initially sidelined with ankle injury for six weeks, he returned to the first team on 27 December 2009, coming on as a second-half substitute, in a 1–0 loss against North Queensland Fury. On 10 January 2010, Brebner signed a one–year contract extension with the club. In the A-League Grand Final against Sydney FC, he and Leigh Broxham were the only successful Melbourne Victory penalty taker when the club lost 4–2 after the match was played 120 minutes with a 1–1 draw. At the end of the 2009–10 season, Brebner went on to make thirty–one appearances and scoring once in all competitions.

Throughout the 2010–11 season, Brebner continued to be involved in the first team for Melbourne Victory despite being sidelined on four occasions. He scored his first goal of the season, in a 3–0 win against Brisbane Roar on 12 September 2010. On 19 November 2010, Brebner scored an own goal to give Central Coast Mariners an equaliser, in a 2–2 draw. Upon returning from suspension, he scored his second goal of the season, in a 2–1 win against Central Coast Mariners on 31 December 2010. In the absence of Muscat, Brebner captained the club against Sydney FC on 15 January 2011, as Melbourne Victory drew 1–1. Having won the Victory Medal Player of the Season, he signed a one–year contract extension with the club. At the end of the 2010–11 season, Brebner made twenty–eight appearances and scoring two times in all competitions.

Brebner started in the first three league matches of the 2011–12 season before he suffered a calf injury that saw him sidelined for a month. On 27 November 2011, Brebner made his return from injury, coming on as a 73rd-minute substitute, in a 3–2 win against Gold Coast United. However, he received a red card for a second bookable offence, in a 0–0 draw against Melbourne Heart on 4 February 2012, in what turned out to be his last appearance for the club. At the end of the 2011–12 season, Brebner made thirteen appearances in all competitions. On 1 May 2012, he was released by Melbourne Victory, ending his six years association with the club.

==== Betting controversy ====
In December 2008, Brebner was fined A$5,000 and banned for four matches after betting on Victory to lose an AFC Champions League match against Chonburi. Brebner, who won under $550 in the bet, was not part of the squad. Craig Moore and Kevin Muscat were also fined after betting on matches not involving their own clubs. Brebner had previously confessed to being a gambling addict, losing more than £100,000, and received professional help for his addiction.

=== Moreland Zebras ===
On 3 July 2012, Brebner joined Victorian Premier League side Moreland Zebras. He made six appearances for the club before retiring from professional football by the end of the year.

== International career ==
Between 1997 and 1999, Brebner represented the Scotland U21 side. He made his debut for Scotland U21, in a 2–0 loss against Colombia U21 on 26 May 1997. Brebner scored his first goal for Scotland U21, in a 1–1 draw against Portugal U21 on 31 May 1997. Throughout 1998, he began to captain Scotland U21 in a number of matches. He went on to make seventeen appearances and scoring once for the Scotland U21 side.

== Managerial career ==
In 2013, Brebner took over the management of the football teams at Mazenod College in Mulgrave, Victoria, while also playing for the local club side, Mazenod United. Later that year, he took over as manager of Richmond SC, but resigned in April 2014. In 2020, he returned to Melbourne Victory as the club's assistant manager under interim coach Carlos Pérez Salvachúa, he was later appointed as the Victory's caretaker manager upon the departure of the latter. On 24 August 2020, Brebner was appointed as Melbourne Victory's manager. Brebner's tenure as Melbourne Victory manager coincided with the worst run of results in Melbourne Victory's history. He was sacked as head coach shortly after Victory's 7–0 loss to local rivals Melbourne City in April 2021, a result which came only a month and a half after losing 6–0 to the same team.

Brebner possesses a UEFA A License.

== Career statistics ==
As of 5 February 2010

Appearances and goals by club, season and competition
Club	Season	League			National cup		League cup		Continental		Total	
Club	Season	Division	Apps	Goals	Apps	Goals	Apps	Goals	Apps	Goals	Apps	Goals
Manchester United	1997–98	Premier League	0	0	0	0	0	0	0	0	0	0
Cambridge United (loan)	1997–98	English Third Division	6	1	—		—		—		6	1
Hibernian (loan)	1997–98	Scottish Premier Division	9	1	—		—		—		9	1
Reading	1998–99	English Second Division	39	9	1	0	3	1	—		43	10
Reading	1999–2000	English Second Division	2	1	—		1	0	—		3	1
Reading	Total		41	10	1	0	4	1	—		46	11
Hibernian	1999–2000	Scottish Premier League	28	1	4	0	1	0	—		33	1
Hibernian	2000–01	Scottish Premier League	11	0	4	0	2	0	—		17	0
Stockport County (loan)	2000–01	English First Division	6	0	—		—		—		6	0
Hibernian	2001–02	Scottish Premier League	28	2	3	1	3	0	1	0	35	3
Hibernian	2002–03	Scottish Premier League	32	3	3	3	3	1	—		38	7
Hibernian	2003–04	Scottish Premier League	22	1	1	0	3	1	—		26	2
Hibernian	2004–05	Scottish Premier League	2	0	—		—		1	0	3	0
Hibernian	Total		132	8	15	4	12	2	1	0	161	14
Dundee United	2004–05	Scottish Premier League	34	2	4	0	2	1	—		40	3
Dundee United	2005–06	Scottish Premier League	26	4	—		1	0	1	0	28	4
Dundee United	Total		60	6	4	0	3	1	1	0	68	7
Melbourne Victory	2006–07	A-League	21	1	—		—		—		21	1
Melbourne Victory	2007–08	A-League	14	0	—		—		—		14	0
Melbourne Victory	2008–09	A-League	20	2	—		—		—		20	2
Melbourne Victory	2009–10	A-League	22	1	—		—		—		22	1
Melbourne Victory	Total		77	4	—		—		—		77	4
Career total			322	29	20	4	19	4	3	0	364	37

== Managerial statistics ==
As of 17 April 2021

Managerial record by team and tenure
Team	From	To	Record				
Team	From	To	P	W	D	L	Win %
Moreland Zebras	12 August 2012	16 September 2012	5	1	1	3	20.0
Richmond	24 May 2013	11 April 2014	21	4	7	10	19.0
Melbourne Victory	11 June 2020	17 April 2021	26	5	3	18	19.2
Total			52	10	11	31	19.2

== Honours ==
Melbourne Victory

- A-League Championship: 2006–07, 2008–09
- A-League Premiership: 2006–07, 2008–09
