= Yannick Zambernardi =

French footballer (born 1977)

Personal information
- Date of birth: 3 September 1977 (age 49)
- Place of birth: Ajaccio, France
- Position: Defender

Senior career*
Years	Team	Apps	(Gls)
1997–1998	Bastia	0	(0)
1998–1999	Gazélec Ajaccio	17	(0)
1999–2000	Ajaccio	18	(0)
2000–2002	Troyes	16	(0)
2002–2004	Hibernian	35	(0)
2004–2005	La Louvière	16	(0)
2005–2006	Dunfermline	15	(0)
2006–2007	Istres	5	(0)
Total		122	(0)
- * Club domestic league appearances and goals

Yannick Zambernardi (born 3 September 1977) is a French former professional footballer. During his career, Zambernardi played for French clubs SC Bastia, Gazélec Ajaccio, AC Ajaccio, Troyes and FC Istres, as well as Hibernian and Dunfermline Athletic in Scotland, and La Louvière in Belgium.

== Career ==
Born in Ajaccio, France, Zambernardi started his career with Ligue 1 side Bastia in 1997 but failed to make any appearances. He then moved to his hometown Ajaccio, firstly playing for Gazélec Ajaccio and then AC Ajaccio. From there he moved to Troyes.

Zambernardi attracted attention from Hibernian manager Bobby Williamson. He was signed in August 2002, playing 35 league games before leaving to join Belgian side La Louvière in June 2004. After spending one season in Belgium, Zambernardi returned to Scotland this time to play for Dunfermline Athletic. He made his debut against Celtic in August 2005 but after 15 league games, was released at the end of the season. He then signed for French side FC Istres, playing only five games before being released.

== Honours ==
Troyes AC

- UEFA Intertoto Cup: 2001
