= Paul Hilland =

Scottish footballer

Personal information
- Date of birth: 28 July 1983 (age 43)
- Position: Defender

Senior career*
Years	Team	Apps	(Gls)
2001–2003	Hibernian	3	(0)
2003	→ Cowdenbeath (loan)	2	(1)
2003–2004	Berwick Rangers	13	(2)
2004–2005	Queen of the South	0	(0)
2005–2006	Clyde	0	(0)
2005	→ Raith Rovers (loan)	7	(0)
2006–2007	Arthurlie	0	(0)
2007–2008	Irvine Meadow	0	(0)
- * Club domestic league appearances and goals

Paul Hilland (born 28 July 1983) is a Scottish former footballer who played for several clubs in the Scottish Premier League and Scottish Football League.

Hilland broke into the Hibs first team squad for the same time as Derek Riordan, and they were both loaned to Cowdenbeath during the 2002–03 season. Hilland played in three SPL games for Hibs, all towards the end of the 2001–02 season, when manager Bobby Williamson gave an opportunity to younger players while two senior players (Ian Murray and Ulrik Laursen) were injured. Hilland was one of many players released by Hibs during the 2003 close season, as the club sought to cut their wage bill significantly.

After being released by Hibs, Hilland moved between several SFL clubs, including Berwick Rangers, Queen of the South and Raith Rovers, the latter of whom he joined on a loan deal from Clyde. Hilland eventually moved into the junior leagues, although he briefly emigrated to Australia.

On 4 October 2013, Hilland signed for Linlithgow Rose.
