= Ian Murray (footballer) =

Scottish footballer (born 1981)

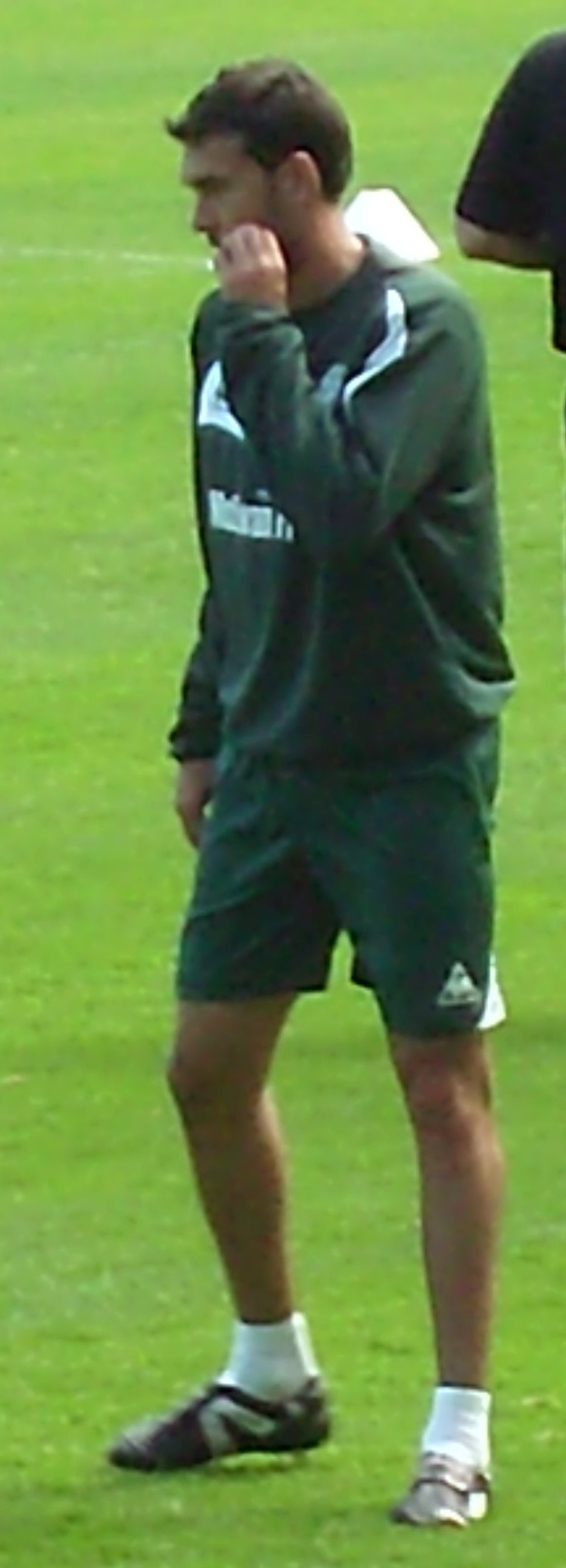
- Murray training in 2009

Personal information
- Full name: Ian William Murray
- Date of birth: 20 March 1981 (age 45)
- Place of birth: Edinburgh, Scotland
- Position: Utility player

Youth career
- Hutchison Vale
- 1998–1999: Dundee United

Senior career*
Years	Team	Apps	(Gls)
1999–2005	Hibernian	141	(13)
2000–2001	→ Alloa Athletic (loan)	2	(0)
2005–2007	Rangers	43	(0)
2007–2008	Norwich City	9	(0)
2008–2012	Hibernian	112	(0)
2012	Brechin City (trialist)	1	(0)
Total		308	(13)

International career
2002–2006	Scotland	6	(0)

Managerial career
- 2012–2015: Dumbarton
- 2015: St Mirren
- 2018–2022: Airdrieonians
- 2022–2024: Raith Rovers
- 2026: Greenock Morton
- * Club domestic league appearances and goals

Ian William Murray (born 20 March 1981) is a Scottish football player and coach, who was most recently the manager of Scottish Championship club Greenock Morton.

During his playing career, Murray represented Hibernian, Alloa Athletic (on loan), Rangers and Norwich City. He also played for Scotland in six full internationals between 2002 and 2006. His versatility meant that he was deployed in a variety of roles in his career, including centre back, full back and midfielder. Murray stated that he preferred to play at centre back or central midfield.

Murray started his career with Hibs, and captained the club during the 2004–05 season. He signed for Rangers under freedom of contract in 2005, but he was troubled with injuries during his time at Ibrox club and was eventually diagnosed with a form of arthritis. He was released by Rangers in August 2007 and signed for Norwich City, but fell out of favour there after a managerial change. He returned to Hibs in January 2008, and was made vice captain of the team in July 2009.

Murray left Hibs in May 2012 and was appointed player/manager of Dumbarton later that year. After two and a half years in charge of Dumbarton, he was appointed manager of St Mirren on 22 May 2015. He resigned from this position in December 2015. After a spell coaching in Norway, Murray was appointed Airdrieonians manager in October 2018, where he would stay for four seasons. In May 2022, he was appointed manager of Raith Rovers. After 7th and 2nd place finishes in the Scottish Championship, he was sacked by Raith in August 2024.

Murray was appointed manager of Greenock Morton in January 2026.

== Club career ==
=== Hibernian ===
Born in Edinburgh, Murray made his debut for Hibernian against Dundee Utd on 22 January 2000 and he scored his first goal for the club in his second appearance, a 4–1 win against Dunfermline. He missed most of the 2003–04 season due to a knee injury. After returning from injury, he was made captain of Hibs in the 2004–05 season and formed a defensive partnership with Gary Caldwell.

=== Rangers ===
Murray joined Rangers on a Bosman free transfer in the summer of 2005, but injuries troubled him during his time at the club. It was eventually diagnosed that he was suffering from reactive arthritis. His return to the team against Motherwell was manager Paul Le Guen's last match in charge.

=== Norwich City ===
Murray signed for Norwich City following his release by Rangers in August 2007. He made his Norwich debut against Hull City two days later, but he had a difficult start to his Norwich career due to illness. He was substituted at half-time in a League Cup tie at Rochdale after a dreadful performance, with Norwich manager Peter Grant admitting afterwards that he should not have played Murray as the player was unwell. His health problems continued as he was ruled out of subsequent matches.

Grant left the club in October 2007, and Murray failed to establish himself in the Norwich first team under new boss Glenn Roeder. In an interview given after his departure, Murray said of Roeder, "It was the first time in my life I felt like chucking it during a game, a lot of the players felt that way. He's an angry man, not nice to play for."

=== Return to Hibernian ===
After leaving Norwich, Murray moved back to his first club, Hibernian, on a contract until the end of the 2007–08 season; he subsequently signed a deal to keep him at the club until 2010. He was a candidate for the Hibs captaincy after Rob Jones left for Scunthorpe United in the summer of 2009. New manager John Hughes decided to give the armband to Chris Hogg, with Murray serving as vice captain.

Midway through the 2009–10 season, Hibs opened contract talks with Murray, whose contract was due to expire in the summer of 2010. At the same time, he started coaching East of Scotland Football League club Coldstream on a part-time basis. A two-year contract extension was agreed in February 2010.

Murray spent the majority of his second spell at Hibs as a left back, although manager Colin Calderwood used him as a defensive midfielder to good effect as Hibs won 3–0 against Rangers in November 2010. The Daily Record newspaper commented that Murray showed leadership qualities which had been previously lacking in a struggling Hibs side. He was appointed captain, on a temporary basis until the end of the season, when Chris Hogg was released by the club.

Murray was awarded a testimonial by Hibs in the 2011–12 season. He played regularly in the early part of the season, but appeared infrequently after suffering an injured hip. He left Hibs in May 2012, at the end of his contract. Over his two spells at the club he made 296 appearances in all competitions, scoring 17 goals.

After leaving Hibs, Murray had a trial spell with American club Tampa Bay Rowdies. He then returned to Scotland and played as a trialist for Dunfermline in a pre-season friendly match. He played for Brechin City in a Scottish Second Division match on 1 September 2012 as a trialist.

== International career ==
Murray captained the Scotland Under-21 side. His debut for the full national team came as a substitute against Canada in October 2002, in a 3–1 win. He did not win another cap until two years later, when he came on at half time in a 2006 FIFA World Cup qualification match against Moldova, which ended in a 1–1 draw. His only start for the national team was in a 1–0 home defeat against Belarus, during which Murray was substituted at half time. In total he has won six caps for Scotland. He admitted in October 2009 that his international career was over, after he was overlooked for selection by George Burley for a friendly match against Japan.

== Coaching career ==
=== Dumbarton ===
At the age of 31, Murray moved into management when he was appointed Dumbarton manager in November 2012. His managerial debut was delayed due to bad weather postponing fixtures following his appointment. He finally made his bow on 17 December in a 3–1 defeat to Hamilton in the fourth round of the Scottish Cup. Dumbarton's league results dramatically improved after Murray was appointed and he was voted First Division manager of the month for January 2013. He eventually led the Sons to safety from relegation, which was secured with a 3–2 win at Cowdenbeath. In his first full season in charge, Dumbarton finished just below the promotion play-off positions and reached the quarter-final of the 2013–14 Scottish Cup. He signed a new two-year contract with Dumbarton in May 2014. He did not register himself as a player for the 2014/15 season.

He left the club to join St Mirren on 22 May 2015, having won 41 of his 108 games in charge.

=== St Mirren ===
Murray took over from Saints interim manager Gary Teale, and penned a two-year deal to manage the club. Despite Murray being appointed a day before the end of the 2014–15 season, Teale remained in charge for the final game. In November, St Mirren replaced Mark Alexander Spalding with Alex Miller as assistant manager, in an attempt to turn around a bad start to the season. Murray resigned on 12 December, after a 1–0 defeat against his former club Dumbarton.

=== Asker ===
On 21 December 2016 it was revealed that he was becoming assistant manager of Norwegian club Asker on 1 January 2017.

=== Airdrieonians ===
Murray returned to Scottish football in October 2018, when he was appointed manager of League One club Airdrieonians. He signed a new contract with Airdrie in September 2019. Murray would get Airdrie to 2nd in League One, and in the Championship play-off final in 2020–21 and 2021–22, but would fall at the last hurdle both times against Greenock Morton and Queen's Park respectively.

=== Raith Rovers ===
On 24 May 2022, Scottish Championship side Raith Rovers announced that they had signed Murray on a two-year contract following the expiry of his contract with Airdrieonians.

However on the 4 August 2024, Murray was sacked just two months after almost winning promotion to the Premiership.

=== Greenock Morton ===
On 2 January 2026, Greenock Morton announced that they had signed Murray on a contract until June 2027. He left this position on 1 October, with the team sitting bottom of the Championship table.

== Career statistics ==
=== Club ===
As of 16 May 2013

Appearances and goals by club, season and competition
Club	Season	League		National cup		League cup		Europe		Total	
Club	Season	App	Goals	App	Goals	App	Goals	App	Goals	App	Goals
Hibernian	1999–00	9	0	2	1	0	0	0	0	11	1
Hibernian	2000–01	21	1	4	0	0	0	0	0	25	1
Hibernian	2001–02	32	2	3	0	3	0	2	0	40	2
Hibernian	2002–03	36	8	3	1	1	1	0	0	40	10
Hibernian	2003–04	14	1	0	0	2	1	0	0	16	2
Hibernian	2004–05	29	1	3	0	2	0	0	0	34	1
Hibernian	Total	141	13	15	2	8	2	2	0	166	17
Alloa (loan)	2000–01	2	0	0	0	0	0	0	0	2	0
Rangers	2005–06	30	0	2	0	2	0	8	0	42	0
Rangers	2006–07	13	0	1	0	0	0	4	0	18	0
Rangers	Total	43	0	3	0	2	0	12	0	60	0
Norwich	2007–08	9	0	0	0	2	0	0	0	11	0
Hibernian	2007–08	15	0	2	0	0	0	0	0	17	0
Hibernian	2008–09	28	0	1	0	1	0	2	0	32	0
Hibernian	2009–10	34	0	4	0	2	0	0	0	40	0
Hibernian	2010–11	20	0	2	0	0	0	2	0	24	0
Hibernian	2011–12	15	0	0	0	2	0	0	0	17	0
Hibernian	Total	112	0	9	0	5	0	4	0	130	0
Brechin City	2012–13	1	0	0	0	0	0	0	0	1	0
Career total		308	13	27	2	17	2	18	0	370	17

=== International ===
Appearances and goals by national team and year
National team	Year	Apps	Goals
Scotland	2002	1	0
Scotland	2003	—	
Scotland	2004	2	0
Scotland	2005	1	0
Scotland	2006	2	0
Total		6	0

=== Managerial record ===
As of match played 25 September 2026

Team	From	To	Record				
Team	From	To	G	W	D	L	Win %
Dumbarton	22 November 2012	22 May 2015	108	41	15	52	37.96
St Mirren	22 May 2015	12 December 2015	21	5	6	10	23.81
Airdrieonians	19 October 2018	24 May 2022	143	67	28	48	46.85
Raith Rovers	24 May 2022	4 August 2024	105	47	26	32	44.76
Greenock Morton	2 January 2026	1 October 2026	29	4	5	20	13.79
Total			405	164	80	161	40.49
