= Alen Orman =

Austrian footballer

Personal information
- Date of birth: 31 May 1978 (age 48)
- Place of birth: Bugojno, SFR Yugoslavia
- Height: 1.83 m (6 ft 0 in)
- Position: Right back

Senior career*
Years	Team	Apps	(Gls)
1996–2000	Admira Wacker		
2000–2001	Royal Antwerp	19	(1)
2001–2005	Hibernian	85	(4)
2005–2006	FC Thun	19	(0)
2006–2007	Dynamo Dresden	23	(1)
2007–2008	SCR Altach	18	(1)

International career
2002	Austria	1	(0)
- * Club domestic league appearances and goals

Alen Orman (born 31 May 1978) is a naturalized Austrian football player who represented the Austria national football team once.

== Club career ==
Orman, who is a wing-back, has previously played for Antwerp, Thun, Hibernian and Dynamo Dresden before moving to Altach in summer 2007.

Signed by Hibernian in 2001, Orman had an epileptic seizure during a Scottish League Cup tie against Rangers in October 2002. Another seizure prevented him from playing in a league match against Motherwell in May 2003.

== International career ==
He made one appearance for Austria, in a November 2002 friendly match against Norway.

== Statistics ==
Austria national team
Year	Apps	Goals
2002	1	0
Total	1	0
