= Frédéric Arpinon =

French footballer (born 1969)

Personal information
- Date of birth: 9 May 1969 (age 57)
- Place of birth: Nîmes, France
- Height: 1.76 m (5 ft 9 in)
- Position: Midfielder

Senior career*
Years	Team	Apps	(Gls)
1989–1994	Nîmes	79	(8)
1992–1993	→ Nice (loan)	28	(8)
1994–1995	Sedan	37	(2)
1995–1997	Metz	59	(4)
1997–1999	Strasbourg	40	(4)
1999–2001	Troyes	47	(2)
2001–2003	Hibernian	35	(2)
2003–2004	Nîmes	11	(1)

Managerial career
- 2007–2008: Istres
- 2014: Istres
- * Club domestic league appearances and goals

Frédéric Arpinon (born 9 May 1969) is a French former professional footballer. Arpinon played for several clubs in France and had a spell with Scottish side Hibernian. While coaching at FC Istres, he proposed a link-up with Hibernian. While at Metz he played in the final as they won the 1995–96 Coupe de la Ligue.
