= Tam McManus =

Scottish footballer

Personal information
- Full name: Thomas Kelly McManus
- Date of birth: 28 February 1981 (age 45)
- Place of birth: Balornock, Scotland
- Position: Forward

Senior career*
Years	Team	Apps	(Gls)
1997–2005	Hibernian	109	(19)
2000	→ East Fife (loan)	11	(3)
2000–2001	→ Airdrieonians (loan)	1	(0)
2004	→ Boston United (loan)	8	(2)
2005–2006	Dundee	37	(10)
2006–2007	Falkirk	5	(0)
2007–2008	Dunfermline Athletic	26	(3)
2008–2009	Colorado Rapids	20	(6)
2009	Derry City	22	(8)
2010	Ayr United	17	(5)
2010–2011	Falkirk	16	(7)
2011–2012	Ayr United	5	(0)
2012–2013	Rochester Rhinos	49	(8)
2014	Limerick	13	(4)
2015–2016	Gartcairn Juniors	8	(7)
Total		343	(82)

International career^{‡}
2001–2003	Scotland U21	14	(0)
- Scotland Future
- * Club domestic league appearances and goals as of 22:16, 8 February 2016 (UTC) ‡ National team caps and goals as of 6 March 2010

Thomas Kelly "Tam" McManus (born 28 February 1981) is a Scottish former footballer.

McManus started his career with Hibernian, making over 100 league appearances for the Edinburgh club. During his time there, McManus played for the Scotland under-21 team and the Scotland Future team. After leaving Hibs in January 2005, McManus had a nomadic career, including two spells in both the US and the Republic of Ireland.

== Career ==
=== Early career ===
McManus grew up in Balornock and Bishopbriggs in the north of Glasgow as a boyhood Celtic supporter, and he started his career with Hibernian, making his debut against Stranraer in 1999. He made his first start in an Edinburgh derby against Heart of Midlothian a year later. He had earlier gained first-team experience with loan spells at East Fife and then Airdrieonians. McManus went on to become a first-team regular for Hibs, enjoying his best season in 2002–03, when he scored 11 goals finishing top goalscorer at the club. On 23 August 2003, McManus scored "a magnificent volley" in a 5–2 defeat to Rangers at Ibrox.

In August 2004, new Hibs manager Tony Mowbray decided McManus would not feature in Hibs' first team plans and he was loaned to Boston United. McManus failed to settle in Lincolnshire, and returned north to sign for Dundee in January 2005. The Dark Blues were struggling in the league, and despite Calum McDonald's goal in a relegation-decider against Livingston, Dundee were demoted to the Scottish First Division. After the game McManus was photographed lying on the pitch in floods of tears. Financial difficulties at Dundee, resultant from relegation and an earlier spell in administration required them to remove the highest-earners from their wage bill and along with Lee Wilkie, McManus negotiated a release settlement in mid-2006.

=== Falkirk and Dunfermline Athletic ===
McManus signed for Falkirk in August 2006, but after playing a largely peripheral role in the first half of the 2006–07 season, he was released by the Bairns. Four weeks later, McManus signed a short-term contract with Dunfermline for the remainder of the current season. He scored two goals in six games. In June, he signed a new two-year deal at East End Park despite interest from at least three other SPL clubs. He appeared as a substitute in the UEFA Cup against BK Häcken of Sweden on 30 August 2007 and scored the winning goal on 6 October 2007 against Queen of the South.

=== Colorado Rapids ===
In March 2008, McManus was approached by MLS side Colorado Rapids and offered a trial while the club were playing friendlies in England. McManus played 45 minutes against Ipswich Town in a pre-season game for the American side and was widely expected to sign for the side. After over a week of extensive medicals, McManus eventually signed for the MLS outfit on 28 March 2008. McManus made his Colorado Rapids debut on 12 April 2008, coming on as a half-time substitute in the game against New England Revolution. He scored his first Rapids goal in a 2–1 loss to Chicago Fire on 26 April 2008. McManus won the Week 9 Sierra Mist Goal of the Week honour for his 40-yard strike against Chivas USA on 24 May 2008. He was released by the club after refusing to accept a cut in wages.

=== Derry City ===
McManus signed for League of Ireland club Derry City on 26 March 2009. McManus was signed for a second time by Stephen Kenny, who was previously his manager at Dunfermline Athletic. McManus scored his first competitive goal for Derry City on 16 July 2009, in their Europa League Second Qualifying Round first leg match away to Latvian side Skonto FC in a 1–1 draw. He left Derry City and returned to Scotland as a free agent due to an illegal contract scandal whereby Derry City were found to be paying salaries more than the 65% of turnover stipulated by the League rules.

=== Return to Scotland ===
McManus trained with Ayr United during December 2009. He then went on trial with Grimsby Town for a week, but left after the trial period ended to go back to Scotland. McManus subsequently signed for Ayr United on a deal that tied him to the club until the end of the 2009–10 season. McManus scored on his debut in a 2–1 defeat against Dundee in the fifth round of the Scottish Cup, but left the club at the end of the season.

McManus signed a short-term contract with Falkirk, one of his former clubs, on 2 September 2010. He scored two goals on his second debut for Falkirk, in a 3–1 win against Queen of the South. Despite hitting 7 goals in 11 league starts, McManus was unable to agree to new terms and left the club. McManus signed for Ayr United on a short-term contract in November 2011.

=== Later career ===
On 6 February 2012 the Rochester Rhinos of USL Pro announced the signing of McManus. On 20 March 2014 McManus confirmed his signing for League of Ireland Premier Division team Limerick. In June 2015, McManus came out of retirement to sign for newly formed Gartcairn Juniors in the SJFA Central District League Second Division but a hamstring injury ended his playing career for a second time in February 2016.

== After playing ==
=== Radio ===
McManus is now a regular live match reporter on BBC Radio Scotland's football coverage of Scottish football on Sportsound: Open All Mics.

=== Journalism ===
McManus has also moved into football journalism writing regularly about Scottish football for The Herald newspaper. He speaks on the daily internet football programme, PLZ Soccer’s The Football Show.

=== Hibs TV ===
As of season 20/21 McManus has been a regular co-commentator for matches broadcast on Hibs TV to season ticket holders/International Hibs TV subscribers.

== See also ==
- Dunfermline Athletic F.C. season 2007-08
