= Luna (footballer) =

Spanish footballer (born 1971)

Personal information
- Full name: Francisco Javier Aguilera Blanco
- Date of birth: 23 September 1971 (age 55)
- Place of birth: Jerez de la Frontera, Spain
- Height: 1.82 m (6 ft 0 in)
- Position: Striker

Youth career
- Flamenco
- Sanluqueño

Senior career*
Years	Team	Apps	(Gls)
1991	Sanluqueño	10	(0)
1991–1992	Puerto Real		
1992–1993	San Fernando	23	(9)
1993–1994	Mármol Macael	32	(6)
1994–1995	Almería	38	(14)
1995–1996	Albacete	39	(13)
1996–2000	Sporting Gijón	45	(7)
1998–1999	→ Hércules (loan)	27	(6)
2000	→ Dundee (loan)	9	(3)
2000–2001	Monterrey	24	(1)
2001–2003	Hibernian	43	(8)
2003–2006	Almería	97	(17)
2006–2009	Écija	88	(26)
Total		475	(110)
- * Club domestic league appearances and goals

Francisco Javier Aguilera Blanco (born 23 September 1971), commonly known as Luna and sometimes Paco Luna, is a Spanish former professional footballer who played as a striker.

After having spent the early part of his career in his country, his La Liga totals consisting of 60 matches and 17 goals, he appeared for two clubs in Scotland in his late 20s and early 30s.

== Club career ==
Born in Jerez de la Frontera, Province of Cádiz, Luna made his professional debut with UD Almería – also in Andalusia – in the Segunda División, after spending the first part of his career as a senior in lower league or amateur football.

In December 1995, his solid performances attracted the attention of La Liga club Albacete Balompié. He scored ten goals in the second part of the season, but the Castilla–La Mancha side were relegated after five years.

Luna signed with Sporting de Gijón also of the top division, in another winter transfer move, but his stay in Asturias would not be very successful individually, also being loaned twice, first with Hércules CF. His second loan move was with Scottish Premier League team Dundee in 2000; he impressed in his beginnings in Scotland by netting three times in five starts, but cited family reasons for leaving the country.

After one year in Mexico with C.F. Monterrey, where he again linked up with his "mentor" Benito Floro, Luna made a surprise return to Scotland with Hibernian. He had a good first season with Hibs, notably scoring twice in a UEFA Cup first-round tie against AEK Athens FC (3–2 home win, 3–4 aggregate exit).

Luna had a less successful second year, however, and was allowed to come back to Spain in January 2003, returning to former club Almería where he produced three and a half respectable seasons in the second tier. In the summer of 2006 he signed for another team in his native area, lowly Écija Balompié.
