= Frédéric Daquin =

French footballer (born 1978)

Personal information
- Full name: Frédéric Daquin
- Date of birth: 23 September 1978 (age 48)
- Place of birth: Bordeaux, France
- Height: 6 ft 0 in (1.83 m)
- Position: Winger

Youth career
- AS Cannes

Senior career*
Years	Team	Apps	(Gls)
1997–1999	AS Cannes	5	(0)
1999–2000	ES Fréjus	30	(2)
2000–2001	Etoile Carouge	35	(7)
2002	Hibernian	4	(0)
2003	FC Rouen	11	(1)
2003–2004	Hibernian	2	(0)
2004–2005	Saint-Raphaël	42	(17)
2006–2007	Dunfermline Athletic	29	(1)
2007–2009	Dundee	48	(2)
2010–2011	FC Chartres	17	(1)

International career
1995–1996	France U17		
1996–1997	France U18		
- * Club domestic league appearances and goals as of 17:37, 9 May 2009 (UTC)

Frédéric "Freddie" Daquin (born 23 September 1978) is a French association football player.

Daquin was signed for Dunfermline Athletic on 27 January 2006 by Pars manager Jim Leishman. He succeeded in becoming a regular in the team, appearing in the 2006 Scottish League Cup Final against Celtic. He scored his first and only goal for the club in a 1–0 win over Dundee United. Following Jim Leishman's resignation, however, the new manager Stephen Kenny told Daquin he was free to leave the club during January 2007.

Daquin then signed for Dundee in July 2007 although he failed to have his contract renewed when it expired in 2009.
