= Derek Riordan =

Scottish footballer (born 1983)

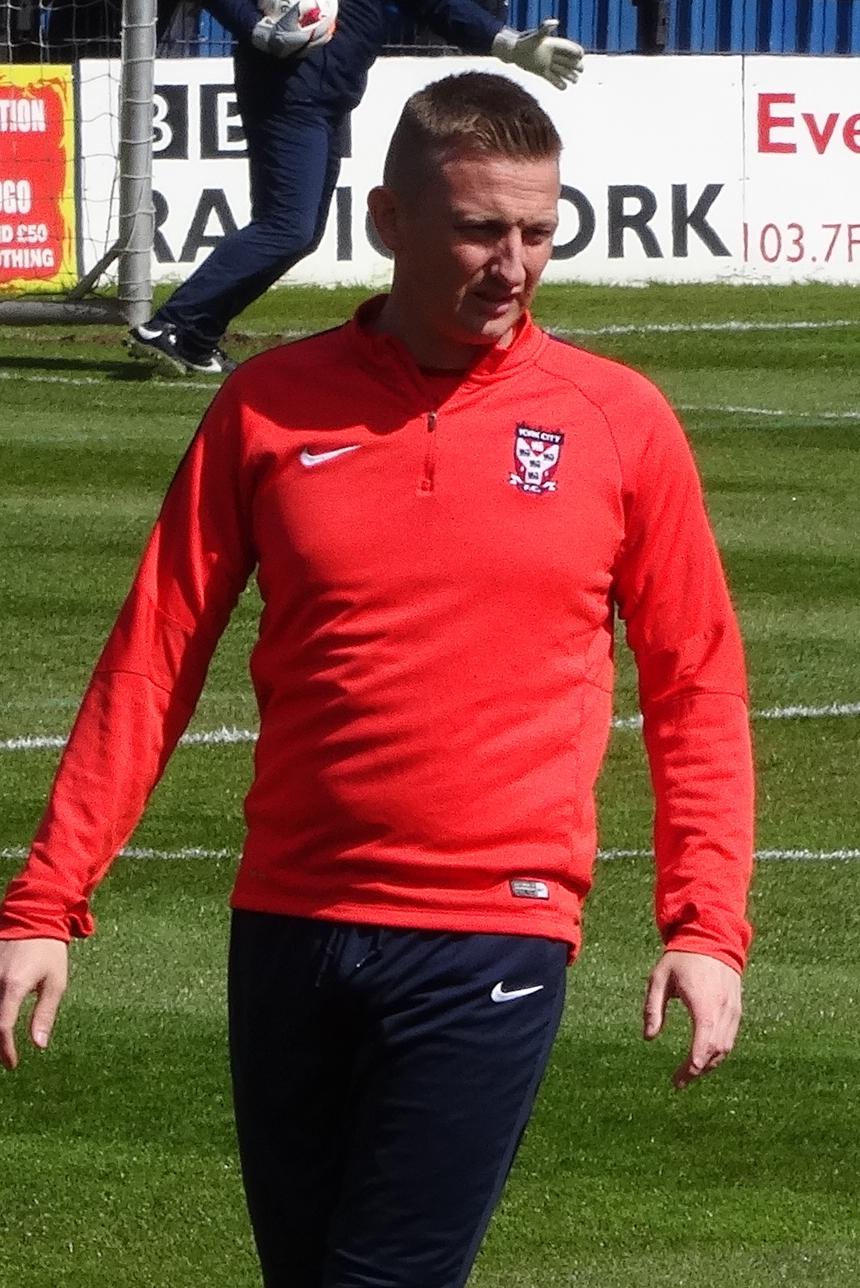
- Riordan training with York City in 2016

Personal information
- Full name: Derek George Riordan
- Date of birth: 16 January 1983 (age 43)
- Place of birth: Edinburgh, Scotland
- Height: 5 ft 10 in (1.78 m)
- Position: Striker

Youth career
- Pilton Sporting Club
- Hutchison Vale
- 1999–2001: Hibernian

Senior career*
Years	Team	Apps	(Gls)
2001–2006	Hibernian	123	(54)
2003	→ Cowdenbeath (loan)	2	(3)
2006–2008	Celtic	24	(5)
2008–2011	Hibernian	102	(36)
2011	Shaanxi Baorong Chanba	9	(1)
2012	St Johnstone	4	(0)
2012	Bristol Rovers	11	(0)
2014	Alloa Athletic	2	(0)
2014	Brechin City (trial)	1	(0)
2015	East Fife	11	(4)
2016	York City	4	(0)
2017	Edinburgh City	7	(3)
Total		300	(106)

International career
2001	Scotland U19	5	(3)
2004–2005	Scotland U21	5	(0)
2005–2009	Scotland	3	(0)
- * Club domestic league appearances and goals

Derek George Riordan (born 16 January 1983) is a Scottish former professional footballer who played as a striker. He was capped three times by the Scotland national team.

Riordan started his career with Hibernian in 2001 and had a brief spell on loan with Cowdenbeath in 2003. He became one of the top young players in the Scottish Premier League, winning the young player of the year awards in 2005. Riordan signed for Celtic in 2006, but failed to hold down a regular first-team place and returned to Hibernian in 2008. He totalled 104 goals in 260 appearances across all competitions in his two spells at Easter Road.

Riordan left Hibs as a free agent in 2011 and signed for Chinese Super League club Shaanxi Baorong Chanba, but the two-year contract was mutually terminated after just four months. He then signed for St Johnstone on a short-term contract in March 2012. Riordan then signed for Bristol Rovers, but he was released after a three-month deal. He has since had short spells with Alloa Athletic, Brechin City, East Fife, York City, Edinburgh City and amateurs St Bernard's.

== Club career ==
=== Hibernian ===
Born in Edinburgh and raised in the city's Pilton area, Riordan signed for Hibernian on 14 May 1999 and made his first-team debut in 2001 in an Edinburgh derby. In January 2003, Riordan went on loan to Cowdenbeath, along with teammate Paul Hilland. He scored four goals in three appearances for the Fife club, including a hat-trick in a 7–5 win away to Brechin City. Cowdenbeath wanted to extend the loan to the end of the 2002–03 season, but he returned to Hibernian at the end of January.

Riordan was given an extended opportunity in the Hibs first team towards the end of the 2002–03 season. He became a first team regular the following season. Riordan was the club's top goalscorer for each of the next three seasons, with 18, 23 and 20 goals respectively. This earned him recognition in the form of the PFA Scotland Young Player of the Year and SFWA Young Player of the Year awards in 2005, and selections for the Scotland national team later that year.

At the end of the 2004–05 season, Riordan rejected an offer of an extension to his contract, and Hibs made him available for transfer. A £500,000 fee was agreed with Cardiff City in August 2005, but Riordan rejected the move. During the January 2006 transfer window, Rangers made a £400,000 bid for Riordan that was rejected by Hibs. Bids from Lokomotiv Moscow and Kaiserslautern were accepted by Hibs, but Riordan rejected these moves because he did not want to move overseas.

Riordan caused controversy in 2005 when he appeared in a video that showed him singing that Hearts player Rudi Skácel was a "fuckin' refugee", to the tune of The Beatles's "Yellow Submarine". Riordan later apologised for his actions.

=== Celtic ===
Riordan signed for Celtic in a £170,000 deal in June 2006. The fee was reduced from the previous offers because Riordan's contract with Hibs was due to expire in October 2006, and Riordan had already made a pre-contract agreement to sign for Celtic on a free transfer in January 2007. Riordan made his full debut for Celtic in a Scottish League Cup tie against St Mirren, as Gordon Strachan fielded a team containing many players who were not first team regulars. He had difficulty obtaining a regular place in the Celtic team; he made only 24 league appearances in two seasons with the club.

Riordan publicly aired his disappointment at not being given more opportunities in the Celtic first team in April 2008, and he subsequently trained with the reserve team. Burnley made a £400,000 offer for Riordan in January 2008, but this was rejected by Celtic. Five other clubs, including his former club Hibernian, made loan offers for Riordan, but Celtic rejected these and informed Riordan that he would have to leave on a "permanent" deal. Hibernian made another loan offer to Celtic for Riordan in August 2008, but this was also rejected by Celtic.

=== Return to Hibernian ===
Riordan returned to Hibernian on the final day of the 2008 summer transfer window for an "undisclosed" fee believed to be around £400,000. Hibs initially gave Riordan the unusual squad number 01, as number 10 had already been allocated to Colin Nish. Riordan was given the number 10 shirt for the 2009–10 season; he was able to do this as Nish had taken number 9 after Steven Fletcher left the club to join Burnley in the summer of 2009. Riordan made his second debut for Hibernian on 13 September 2008, when he came on as a 61st-minute substitute for Joe Keenan against Dundee United. In his second appearance, he scored the only goal of the match against Hamilton Academical. Riordan ended the 2008–09 season as Hibs' top goalscorer with 12 goals.

A good run of form at the start of the following season led to a recall to the Scotland squad and a player of the month award from the SPL. Riordan scored his 100th goal in senior football later that season; he brought up the milestone with a trademark free kick against Kilmarnock that gave Hibs a 1–0 win. Riordan had been omitted from Craig Levein's first Scotland squad, but Hibs manager John Hughes commented that Riordan had "worked very hard" in trying to win an international recall. His consistent goalscoring in the 2008–09 and 2009–10 seasons came about despite often playing in a wide midfield role.

Hughes again praised Riordan during the 2010 pre-season. Soon afterwards, Riordan declared that he wanted to agree a new contract with the club. He was however also linked with a £500,000 move to Azerbaijan Premier League club Gabala, who at the time where managed by Tony Adams. After the sale of Anthony Stokes to Celtic, Hughes started using Riordan as a central striker. Despite scoring three goals in the early part of the season, Riordan was omitted from the Scotland squad in October 2010.

After Hughes was replaced by Colin Calderwood as Hibs manager in October 2010, the new manager gave Riordan the team captaincy. In his second match as captain, the first Edinburgh derby of the season, Riordan was sent off for a reckless lunge on Rudi Skácel in the dying minutes of a 2–0 loss. Riordan bounced back by scoring both goals in a 2–1 win against Motherwell the following weekend. He registered his 100th goal for Hibs in all competitions during a 2–1 defeat at Kilmarnock in December. Riordan was the first player to achieve this milestone since Arthur Duncan thirty years ago. A goal against Hamilton in March 2011 meant that Riordan became the third highest goalscorer in the Scottish Premier League era, behind only the prolific Old Firm goalscorers Kris Boyd and Henrik Larsson.

In April 2011, the Daily Express reported that Riordan would leave Hibernian when his contract expired at the end of the 2010–11 season. The newspaper claimed that Riordan had turned down an offer of a new deal on reduced terms.

=== Shaanxi Baorong Chanba ===
Riordan signed a two-year contract with Chinese Super League club Shaanxi Baorong Chanba in July 2011. On 10 July 2011, Riordan made his debut for Shaanxi Baorong Chanba as a substitute coming on for Fabio Firmani in the 76th minute as they lost 1–0 to Liaoning Whowin, and made his start in a 1–1 draw against Shenzhen Ruby on 14 July. His first goal came when he scored against Chengdu Blades in a 3–1 win on 21 August. He became a favourite player of the fans, but the team performed poorly in the 2011 season. The team manager, Gao Hongbo, criticised Riordan after a defeat by Dalian Shide. Riordan decided to leave the club and his contract was terminated by mutual consent in November 2011.

=== St Johnstone ===
Sky Sports reported that clubs in Italy and Turkey were interested in signing Riordan in January. Riordan trained with Kilmarnock and Blackpool in January, and St Johnstone in March. On 30 March, Riordan signed for St Johnstone until the end of the 2011–12 season. On 21 April 2012, Riordan made his first start in a 2–0 defeat against Dundee United and played 90 minutes in a 5–1 loss against Motherwell on 28 April 2012. The Courier newspaper reported on 15 May that his contract with St Johnstone would not be extended.

Riordan agreed in July 2012 to go on trial with an unnamed club in La Liga. Later in July, Riordan trained with League One club Milton Keynes Dons. In August, Ross County made contact with his agent.

=== Bristol Rovers ===
On 27 September 2012, Riordan signed for League Two club Bristol Rovers on a three-month deal. He made his debut on 29 September, in a 2–1 victory against local rivals Exeter City. He made his home debut on 3 October in a 1–0 defeat to Cheltenham Town. Riordan was released at the end of his contract, having made 12 appearances without scoring a goal.

=== Later career ===
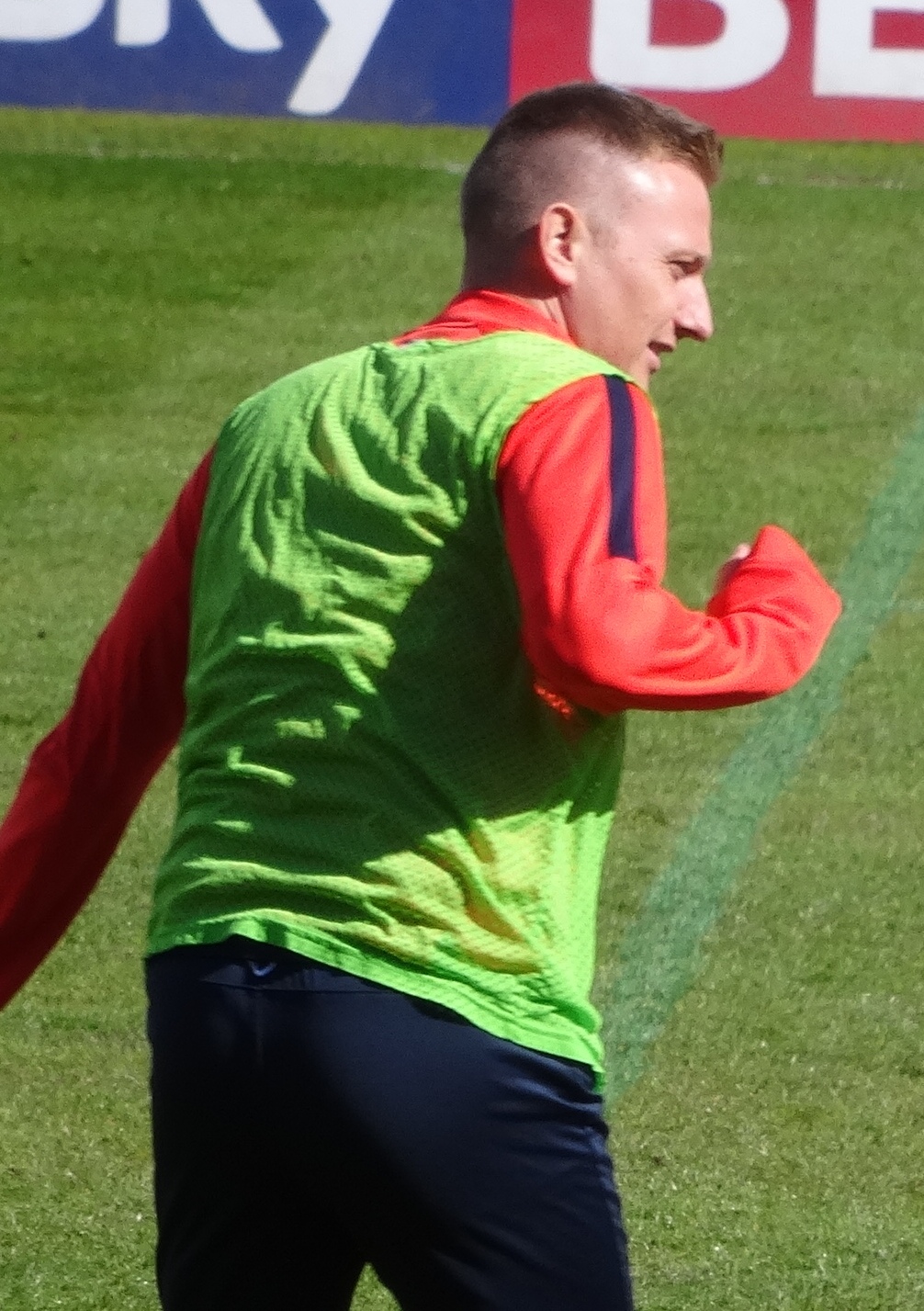
Riordan training with York City in 2016

Riordan trained with Scottish Championship club Alloa Athletic in November 2013. On 14 February 2014, Alloa signed Riordan on a deal until the end of the season. He made only two substitute appearances in a spell that was affected by an ankle injury. Riordan was released by Alloa at the end of the 2013–14 season.

Riordan played as a trialist for Brechin City in October 2014. He was involved in three matches for Brechin, the maximum permitted for a trialist, after which Riordan turned down a contract offer.

He trained with Livingston for a spell, then played as a trialist for East Fife in February 2015, scoring the winning goal in a match against Annan Athletic. East Fife manager Gary Naysmith then offered Riordan a contract to the end of the season, which was signed in early March. Riordan left East Fife at the end of the 2014–15 season. He trained with Hibernian in September 2015, with manager Alan Stubbs commenting that Riordan had been provided with their facilities due to his previous service for the club.

On 29 January 2016, Riordan signed for League Two club York City on a contract until the end of the 2015–16 season. He was released by York when his contract expired.

Riordan signed a short-term contract with Scottish League Two club Edinburgh City on 27 February 2017. He scored on his debut on 11 March 2017, with a 75th-minute goal in a 2–1 away win over Forfar Athletic. Riordan left the club at the end the 2016–17 season following the end of his contract, having scored three goals in seven appearances.

He signed for Edinburgh amateur club St Bernard's in April 2018.

== International career ==
Riordan was capped five times by the Scotland national under-19 team (2001), five times by the under-21 team (2004 to 2005) and three times by the senior team (2005 to 2009).

== Post-football career ==
In January 2020, Riordan took over popular Easter Road bar The Four in Hand, renaming it 'R10rdan's Sports Bar' (styled after the Number 10 shirt number that he had worn at Hibernian).

== Career statistics ==
=== Club ===
As of match played 6 May 2017

Appearances and goals by club, season and competition
Club	Season	League			National Cup (Note: Appearances in Scottish Cup and FA Cup)		League Cup		Other		Total	
Club	Season	Division	Apps	Goals	Apps	Goals	Apps	Goals	Apps	Goals	Apps	Goals
Hibernian	2001–02	Scottish Premier League	6	0	2	0	1	0	0	0	9	0
Hibernian	2002–03	Scottish Premier League	10	3	—		1	0	—		11	3
Hibernian	2003–04	Scottish Premier League	34	15	1	0	5	3	—		40	18
Hibernian	2004–05	Scottish Premier League	37	20	4	1	3	2	0	0	44	23
Hibernian	2005–06	Scottish Premier League	36	16	3	1	2	2	1 (Note: Appearance in UEFA Cup)	1	42	20
Hibernian	Total		123	54	10	2	12	7	1	1	146	64
Cowdenbeath (loan)	2002–03	Scottish Second Division	2	3	1	1	—		—		3	4
Celtic	2006–07	Scottish Premier League	16	4	3	3	2	0	0	0	21	7
Celtic	2007–08	Scottish Premier League	8	1	1	0	1	0	1 (Note: Appearance in UEFA Champions League)	0	11	1
Celtic	2008–09	Scottish Premier League	0	0	—		—		—		0	0
Celtic	Total		24	5	4	3	3	0	1	0	32	8
Hibernian	2008–09	Scottish Premier League	32	12	1	0	—		—		33	12
Hibernian	2009–10	Scottish Premier League	37	13	4	3	2	1	—		43	17
Hibernian	2010–11	Scottish Premier League	33	11	2	0	1	0	2 (Note: Appearances in UEFA Europa League)	0	38	11
Hibernian	Total		102	36	7	3	3	1	2	0	114	40
Shaanxi Baorong Chanba	2011	Chinese Super League	9	1	—		—		—		9	1
St Johnstone	2011–12	Scottish Premier League	4	0	—		—		—		4	0
Bristol Rovers	2012–13	League Two	11	0	1	0	—		—		12	0
Alloa Athletic	2013–14	Scottish Championship	2	0	—		—		—		2	0
Brechin City (trial)	2014–15	Scottish League One	1	0	0	0	—		—		1	0
East Fife	2014–15	Scottish League Two	11	4	—		—		2 (Note: Appearances in Scottish League One play-offs)	0	13	4
York City	2015–16	League Two	4	0	—		—		—		4	0
Edinburgh City	2016–17	Scottish League Two	7	3	—		—		—		7	3
Career total			300	106	23	9	18	8	6	1	347	124

=== International ===
As of match played 14 November 2009

Appearances and goals by national team and year
National team	Year	Apps	Goals
Scotland	2005	1	0
Scotland	2009	2	0
Total		3	0

== Honours ==
Celtic

- Scottish Premier League: 2006–07, 2007–08
- Scottish Cup: 2006–07

Individual

- SFWA Young Player of the Year: 2004–05
- PFA Scotland Young Player of the Year: 2004–05
- Scottish Premier League Player of the Month: September 2009
- Scottish Premier League Young Player of the Month: April 2004, September 2004, November 2004, December 2004, January 2005, May 2005
