= Allan Dempsie =

Scottish footballer (1982–2026)

Personal information
- Date of birth: 5 November 1982
- Place of birth: Bellshill, Scotland
- Date of death: November 2026 (aged 44)
- Height: 5 ft 7 in (1.70 m)
- Position: Right-back

Youth career
- 2000–2002: Hibernian

Senior career*
Years	Team	Apps	(Gls)
2002–2003	Hibernian	5	(0)
2003–2008	Elgin City	129	(1)
2008–2009	Ayr United	32	(0)
2009–2011	Elgin City	50	(0)
2011	Albion Rovers	1	(0)
Total		217	(1)
- * Club domestic league appearances and goals

Allan Dempsie (5 November 1982 – November 2026) was a Scottish footballer who played as a right-back.

== Career ==
Dempsie began his career at Hibernian but made only five league appearances before being released in 2003. He moved down the divisions to sign for Elgin City, where he played for four seasons before joining Ayr United in 2008. Dempsie then returned to Elgin City for a second stint.

He moved to Albion Rovers in summer 2011, ahead of the 2011–12 season but left Rovers after just three games.

== Death ==
Dempsie died in November 2026, aged 44.
