= Kevin Nicol =

Scottish footballer

Personal information
- Full name: Kevin Andrew Nicol
- Date of birth: 19 January 1982 (age 44)
- Place of birth: Kirkcaldy, Scotland
- Position: Defensive midfielder

Team information
- Current team: Fredrikstad (assistant)

Youth career
- 1997–1998: Hill o' Beath
- 1998–1999: Raith Rovers

Senior career*
Years	Team	Apps	(Gls)
1999–2002	Raith Rovers	24	(1)
2002–2005	Hibernian	19	(1)
2005	→ Strømsgodset (loan)	7	(1)
2006	Peterhead	12	(3)
2007–2008	Haugesund	41	(3)
2009	Mjøndalen	25	(1)
2010	Moss	17	(1)
2011	Frigg	24	(6)
2012–2014	Asker	45	(1)

Managerial career
- 2015–2019: Asker
- 2021–2022: Mjøndalen (assistant)
- 2022: Mjøndalen (interim manager)
- 2022–2026: Mjøndalen
- 2026–: Fredrikstad (assistant)
- * Club domestic league appearances and goals as of 2 January 2016

Kevin Nicol (born 19 January 1982, in Kirkcaldy) is a Scottish football manager and former player.

He was the manager of Asker for five seasons. In 2020 he became player developer of Mjøndalen IF. As of 2022, he is the manager of the club.
