= Paul Fenwick =

Canadian soccer player (born 1969)

Personal information
- Full name: Paul Joseph Fenwick
- Date of birth: 25 August 1969 (age 57)
- Place of birth: London, England
- Height: 1.87 m (6 ft 2 in)
- Position: Defender

Senior career*
Years	Team	Apps	(Gls)
1986–1987	Club Roma		
1990	Kitchener Spirit	5	(0)
1991	Hamilton Steelers	12	(0)
1991	Toronto Blizzard	6	(0)
1992	Winnipeg Fury	15	(1)
1992–1994	Birmingham City	19	(0)
1994–1995	Dunfermline Athletic	3	(0)
1995–1998	St Mirren	81	(10)
1998–2000	Greenock Morton	45	(5)
2000	→ Raith Rovers (loan)	2	(0)
2000–2004	Hibernian	84	(4)
Total		234	(19)

International career
1988	Canada U20	2	(0)
1991–1992	Canada U23	8	(1)
1994–2003	Canada	33	(0)
Medal record
Representing Canada
Men's soccer
CONCACAF Gold Cup
Winner	2000 United States
- * Club domestic league appearances and goals

Paul Joseph Fenwick (born 25 August 1969) is a Canadian retired international soccer player. Born in England, he made 33 appearances for the Canada national team. He later worked as a physiotherapist with the Canada national team.

== Club career ==
Fenwick played in Canada for Club Roma, Hamilton Steelers and Winnipeg Fury, in England for Birmingham City, and in Scotland for Dunfermline Athletic, St Mirren, Greenock Morton, Raith Rovers (on loan) and Hibernian. On 30 April 2012, he was inducted into the St. Catharines Sports Hall of Fame.

== International career ==
Fenwick made his debut for Canada in a June 1994 friendly match against the Netherlands and went on to earn a total of 33 caps, scoring no goals. He has represented Canada in 6 FIFA World Cup qualification matches and played in the 1996, 2000 and the 2003 CONCACAF Gold Cups.

His final international was a November 2003 friendly match against Ireland.

== Honours ==
Canada

- CONCACAF Gold Cup: 2000
