= 1990–91 Middlesbrough F.C. season =

Middlesbrough
1990–91 season
- Chairman: Colin Henderson
- Manager: Colin Todd
- Stadium: Ayresome Park
- Second Division: 7th
- FA Cup: Fourth round
- League Cup: Fourth round
- Full Members' Cup: Second round
- Top goalscorer: League: Slaven (16); All: Slaven (19)

During the 1990–91 English football season, Middlesbrough F.C. competed in the Football League Second Division.

== Season summary ==
In the 1990–91 season, Boro finished 7th in the Second Division on goal difference, qualifying for the end of season play-offs. However, they lost in the semifinals of the playoffs against Notts County.

== Squad ==
=== Appearances and goals ===
Appearance and goalscoring records for all the players who were in the Middlesbrough F.C. first team squad during the 1990–91 season.

No.	Pos	Nat	Player	Total		Division 2		FA Cup		League Cup	
No.	Pos	Nat	Player	Apps	Goals	Apps	Goals	Apps	Goals	Apps	Goals
	GK	(England) ENG	Stephen Pears	35	0	27	0	2	0	6	0
	GK	(Wales) WAL	Andy Dibble	21	0	21	0	0	0	0	0
	GK	(England) ENG	Kevin Poole	1	0	0	0	1	0	0	0
	DF	(Republic of Ireland) IRL	Alan Kernaghan	32	0	26	0	0	0	6	0
	DF	(England) ENG	Simon Coleman	23	1	21	1	2	0	0	0
	DF	(England) ENG	Colin Cooper	40	0	33	0	1	0	6	0
	DF	(England) ENG	Tony Mowbray	51	5	42	4	3	0	6	1
	DF	(England) ENG	Jimmy Phillips	55	3	46	3	3	0	6	0
	DF	(England) ENG	Gary Parkinson	12	1	10	1	2	0	0	0
	DF	(England) ENG	Owen McGee	9	1	8	1	1	0	0	0
	MF	(England) ENG	Paul Kerr	30	8	24	6	2	1	4	1
	MF	(England) ENG	Robbie Mustoe	50	8	42	5	2	0	6	3
	MF	(England) ENG	Jamie Pollock	1	0	1	0	0	0	0	0
	MF	(England) ENG	Mark Proctor	21	0	20	0	1	0	0	0
	MF	(England) ENG	Trevor Putney	28	1	25	1	2	0	1	0
	MF	(England) ENG	Stuart Ripley	47	6	40	6	3	0	4	0
	MF	(Republic of Ireland) IRL	Martin Russell	14	2	12	2	0	0	2	0
	MF	(Scotland) SCO	Colin Walsh	13	1	12	1	1	0	0	0
	MF	(Scotland) SCO	John Wark	39	2	32	2	2	0	5	0
	MF	(Scotland) SCO	John Hendrie	52	4	43	3	3	0	6	1
	FW	(England) ENG	Ian Arnold	2	0	2	0	0	0	0	0
	FW	(England) ENG	Ian Baird	55	15	46	14	3	1	6	0
	FW	(Republic of Ireland) IRL	Bernie Slaven	56	19	48	16	3	0	5	3

== Transfers ==
=== In ===
Date	Player	Previous club	Fee
July 1990	(Scotland) John Hendrie	Leeds United	£568,000
July 1990	(England) Robbie Mustoe	Oxford United	£396,000
July 1990	(Scotland) John Wark	Ipswich Town	Free
July 1990	(Republic of Ireland) Martin Russell	Scarborough	Free
January 1991	(Scotland) Colin Walsh	Charlton Athletic	Loan
February 1991	(Wales) Andy Dibble	Manchester City	Loan

=== Out ===
Date	Player	New Club	Fee
July 1990	(England) Mark Brennan	Manchester City	£500,000
July 1990	(England) Peter Davenport	Sunderland	£394,000
October 1990	(England) Mark Burke	Wolves	Loan
March 1991	(England) Mark Burke	Wolves	£32,000
January 1990	(England) Kevin Poole	Hartlepool United	Loan

== Final league table ==
Pos	Team	Pld	W	D	L	GF	GA	GD	Pts	Qualification or relegation
5	Millwall	46	20	13	13	70	51	+19	73	Qualification for the Second Division play-offs
6	Brighton & Hove Albion	46	21	7	18	63	69	−6	70	Qualification for the Second Division play-offs
7	Middlesbrough	46	20	9	17	66	47	+19	69	Qualification for the Second Division play-offs
8	Barnsley	46	19	12	15	63	48	+15	69	
9	Bristol City	46	20	7	19	68	71	−3	67	

Rules for classification: 1) Points; 2) Goal difference; 3) Goals scored

== Results ==
=== Football League Second Division ===
25 August 1990 1	Middlesbrough	0–0	West Ham United	Middlesbrough
				Stadium: Ayresome Park; Attendance: 20,680

1 September 1990 2	Plymouth Argyle	1–1	Middlesbrough	Plymouth
			Bernie Slaven	Stadium: Home Park; Attendance: 6,266

8 September 1990 3	Middlesbrough	1–0	Notts County	Middlesbrough
	Wark			Stadium: Ayresome Park; Attendance: 17,301

15 September 1990 4	Swindon Town	1–3	Middlesbrough	Swindon
			Mustoe; Slaven	Stadium: County Ground; Attendance: 9,127

17 September 1990 5	Port Vale	3–1	Middlesbrough	Stoke
			Russell	Stadium: Vale Park; Attendance: 7,880

22 September 1990 6	Middlesbrough	0–1	Oldham Athletic	Middlesbrough
				Stadium: Ayresome Park; Attendance: 19,363

29 September 1990 7	Middlesbrough	6–0	Leicester City	Middlesbrough
	Kerr; Baird; Hendrie; Phillips; Slaven			Stadium: Ayresome Park; Attendance: 16,237

3 October 1990 8	Newcastle United	0–0	Middlesbrough	Newcastle
				Stadium: St James' Park; Attendance: 17,023

6 October 1990 9	Watford	0–3	Middlesbrough	Watford
			Baird; Mowbray	Stadium: Vicarage Road; Attendance: 8,057

13 October 1990 10	Middlesbrough	2–1	Millwall	Middlesbrough
	Hendrie (o.g.)			Stadium: Ayresome Park; Attendance: 20,277

20 October 1990 11	Middlesbrough	1–2	Bristol Rovers	Middlesbrough
	Kerr			Stadium: Ayresome Park; Attendance: 18,589

23 October 1990 12	Wolverhampton Wanderers	1–0	Middlesbrough	Wolverhampton
				Stadium: Molineux; Attendance: 17,285

27 October 1990 13	Brighton and Hove Albion	2–4	Middlesbrough	Hove
			Baird; Slaven	Stadium: Goldstone Ground; Attendance: 7,532

3 November 1990 14	Middlesbrough	1–0	Barnsley	Middlesbrough
	Kerr			Stadium: Ayresome Park; Attendance: 18,470

6 November 1990 15	West Bromwich Albion	0–1	Middlesbrough	West Bromwich
			Slaven	Stadium: The Hawthorns; Attendance: 10,521

10 November 1990 16	Middlesbrough	1–2	Charlton Athletic	Middlesbrough
	Baird			Stadium: Ayresome Park; Attendance: 17,998

17 November 1990 17	Portsmouth	0–3	Middlesbrough	Portsmouth
			Baird; Slaven (o.g.)	Stadium: Fratton Park; Attendance: 8,433

24 November 1990 18	Oxford United	2–5	Middlesbrough	Oxford
			Baird (pen.); Mustoe; Slaven	Stadium: Manor Ground; Attendance: 5,262

1 December 1990 19	Middlesbrough	3–0	Hull City	Middlesbrough
	Kerr; Baird; Slaven			Stadium: Ayresome Park; Attendance: 17,024

15 December 1990 20	West Ham United	0–0	Middlesbrough	London
				Stadium: Upton Park; Attendance: 23,705

22 December 1990 21	Middlesbrough	0–1	Blackburn Rovers	Middlesbrough
				Stadium: Ayresome Park; Attendance: 17,206

26 December 1990 22	Ipswich Town	0–1	Middlesbrough	Portman Road
				Stadium: Ipswich; Attendance: 12,508

29 December 1990 23	Bristol City	3–0	Middlesbrough	Ashton Gate
				Stadium: Bristol; Attendance: 14,023

1 January 1991 24	Middlesbrough	0–2	Sheffield Wednesday	Middlesbrough
				Stadium: Ayresome Park; Attendance: 22,869

12 January 1991 25	Middlesbrough	0–0	Plymouth Argyle	Middlesbrough
				Stadium: Ayresome Park; Attendance: 14,198

19 January 1991 26	Notts County	3–2	Middlesbrough	Nottingham
			Baird; Ripley	Stadium: Meadow Lane; Attendance: 9,323

2 February 1991 27	Middlesbrough	2-0	Swindon Town	Middlesbrough
	Mustoe; Slaven			Stadium: Ayresome Park; Attendance: 14,588

19 February 1991 28	Middlesbrough	3-2	West Bromwich Albion	Middlesbrough
	Mustoe; Slaven (o.g.)			Stadium: Ayresome Park; Attendance: 15,334

23 February 1991 29	Charlton Athletic	0-1	Middlesbrough	London
			Slaven	Stadium: Selhurst Park; Attendance: 5,510

26 February 1991 30	Portsmouth	2-1	Middlesbrough	Portsmouth
			Parkinson (pen.)	Stadium: Fratton Park; Attendance: 15,930

2 March 1991 31	Hull City	0-0	Middlesbrough	Hull
				Stadium: Boothferry Park; Attendance: 6,828

9 March 1991 32	Middlesbrough	0-0	Oxford United	Middlesbrough
				Stadium: Ayresome Park; Attendance: 14,029

12 March 1991 33	Middlesbrough	3-0	Newcastle United	Middlesbrough
	Walsh; Slaven			Stadium: Ayresome Park; Attendance: 18,250

16 March 1991 34	Leicester City	4-3	Middlesbrough	Leicester
	James; Walsh; Oldfield; Russell		McGee; Phillips; Putney	Stadium: Filbert Street; Attendance: 8,324

20 March 1991 35	Millwall	2-2	Middlesbrough	London
			Mowbray; Kerr	Stadium: The Den; Attendance: 10,371

23 March 1991 36	Middlesbrough	1-2	Watford	Middlesbrough
	Baird			Stadium: Ayresome Park; Attendance: 14,583

30 March 1991 37	Middlesbrough	1-1	Ipswich Town	Middlesbrough
	Mowbray			Stadium: Ayresome Park; Attendance: 15,410

1 April 1991 38	Blackburn Rovers	1-0	Middlesbrough	Blackburn
				Stadium: Ewood Park; Attendance: 8,925

6 April 1991 39	Middlesbrough	2-1	Bristol City	Middlesbrough
	Ripley			Stadium: Ayresome Park; Attendance: 13,846

9 April 1991 40	Middlesbrough	4-0	Port Vale	Middlesbrough
	Baird; Ripley; Russell; Wark			Stadium: Ayresome Park; Attendance: 15,053

13 April 1991 41	Sheffield Wednesday	2-0	Middlesbrough	Sheffield
				Stadium: Hillsborough Stadium; Attendance: 30,598

20 April 1991 42	Bristol Rovers	2-0	Middlesbrough	Bristol
				Stadium: Twerton Park; Attendance: 5,722

27 April 1991 43	Middlesbrough	2-0	Wolverhampton Wanderers	Middlesbrough
	Ripley; Hendrie			Stadium: Ayresome Park; Attendance: 16,447

4 May 1991 44	Middlesbrough	2-0	Brighton and Hove Albion	Middlesbrough
	Coleman; Ripley			Stadium: Ayresome Park; Attendance: 18,054

7 May 1991 45	Oldham Athletic	2-0	Middlesbrough	Oldham
				Stadium: Boundary Park; Attendance: 14,213

11 May 1991 46	Barnsley	1-0	Middlesbrough	Barnsley
				Stadium: Oakwell; Attendance: 14,494

=== Football League Second Division playoffs ===
19 May 1991	Middlesbrough	1–1	Notts County	Ayresome Park, Middlesbrough
12:00	Phillips 86'		Turner 27'	Attendance: 22,343; Referee: Tony Ward

22 May 1991	Notts County	1–0	Middlesbrough	Meadow Lane, Nottingham
19:45	Harding 78'			Attendance: 18,249

Notts County won 2–1 on aggregate.

=== FA Cup ===
5 January 1991 Third round	Middlesbrough	0–0	Plymouth Argyle	Ayresome Park, Middlesbrough
				Attendance: 13,042

14 January 1991 Third round replay	Plymouth Argyle	1–2	Middlesbrough	Home Park, Plymouth
			Kerr; Baird	Attendance: 6,956

26 January 1991 Fourth round replay	Cambridge United	2–0	Middlesbrough	Abbey Stadium, Cambridge
				Attendance: 9,531

=== League Cup ===
28 August 1990 First round first leg	Middlesbrough	1-1	Tranmere Rovers	Middlesbrough
			Mowbray	Stadium: Ayresome Park; Attendance: 10,667

3 September 1990 First round second leg	Tranmere Rovers	1-2 (2-3 agg.)	Middlesbrough	Birkenhead
			Mustoe; Slaven	Stadium: Prenton Park; Attendance: 6,135

25 September 1990 Second round first leg	Middlesbrough	2-0	Newcastle United	Middlesbrough
	Mustoe			Stadium: Ayresome Park; Attendance: 15,042

10 October 1990 Second round second leg	Newcastle United	1-0 (1-2 agg.)	Middlesbrough	Newcastle
	Anderson			Stadium: St James' Park; Attendance: 12,778

30 October 1990 Third round	Middlesbrough	2-0	Norwich City	Middlesbrough
	Kerr; Hendrie			Stadium: Ayresome Park; Attendance: 17,024

28 November 1990 Fourth round	Aston Villa	3-2	Middlesbrough	Birmingham
	Daley; Ormondroyd; Platt		Slaven	Stadium: Villa Park; Attendance: 17,317

=== Full Members' Cup ===
20 November 1990 First Round Northern Section	Middlesbrough	3-1 (a.e.t.)	Hull City	Middlesbrough
				Stadium: Ayresome Park; Attendance: 8,926

19 December 1990 Second Round Northern Section	Manchester City	2-1	Middlesbrough	Manchester
				Stadium: Maine Road; Attendance: 6,406
