= 1989–90 Middlesbrough F.C. season =

Middlesbrough
1989–90 season
- Chairman: Colin Henderson
- Manager: Bruce Rioch/Colin Todd
- Stadium: Ayresome Park
- Second Division: 21st
- FA Cup: Third round
- League Cup: Third round
- Full Members' Cup: Runners up
- Top goalscorer: League: Slaven (21); All: Slaven (25)

During the 1989–90 English football season, Middlesbrough F.C. competed in the Football League Second Division.

== Season summary ==
In the 1989–90 season, Boro finished 21st in the Second Division, only escaping relegation by two points with a dramatic end of season victory at home to local rivals Newcastle United.

== Squad ==
=== Appearances and goals ===
Appearance and goalscoring records for all the players who were in the Middlesbrough F.C. first team squad during the 1989–90 season.

No.	Pos	Nat	Player	Total		Division 2		FA Cup		League Cup	
No.	Pos	Nat	Player	Apps	Goals	Apps	Goals	Apps	Goals	Apps	Goals
	GK	(England) ENG	Stephen Pears	28	0	25	0	3	0	0	0
	GK	(England) ENG	Kevin Poole	25	0	21	0	0	0	4	0
	DF	(Republic of Ireland) IRL	Alan Kernaghan	44	5	37	4	3	0	4	1
	DF	(England) ENG	Simon Coleman	39	1	36	1	3	0	0	0
	DF	(England) ENG	Colin Cooper	26	2	21	2	3	0	2	0
	DF	(England) ENG	Nicky Mohan	24	0	22	0	0	0	2	0
	DF	(England) ENG	Tony Mowbray	34	2	28	2	3	0	3	0
	DF	(England) ENG	Gary Pallister	3	0	3	0	0	0	0	0
	DF	(England) ENG	Jimmy Phillips	12	0	12	0	0	0	0	0
	DF	(England) ENG	Gary Parkinson	48	4	41	3	3	1	4	0
	DF	(England) ENG	Owen McGee	14	0	13	0	0	0	1	0
	MF	(England) ENG	Alan Comfort	18	3	15	2	0	0	3	1
	MF	(England) ENG	Mark Brennan	47	3	40	3	3	0	4	0
	MF	(England) ENG	Gary Gill	2	0	1	0	0	0	1	0
	MF	(England) ENG	Paul Kerr	24	2	17	1	3	0	4	1
	MF	(England) ENG	Mark Proctor	49	4	45	4	1	0	3	0
	MF	(England) ENG	Trevor Putney	32	0	25	0	3	0	4	0
	MF	(England) ENG	Stuart Ripley	44	1	39	1	3	0	2	0
	MF	(England) ENG	Mark Burke	14	1	12	1	0	0	2	0
	FW	(England) ENG	Ian Baird	25	5	19	5	0	0	6	0
	FW	(England) ENG	Peter Davenport	37	3	35	3	0	0	2	0
	FW	(Republic of Ireland) IRL	Bernie Slaven	53	25	46	21	3	0	4	4

== Transfers ==
=== In ===
Date	Player	Previous club	Fee
July 1989	(England) Trevor Putney	Norwich City	£342,000
March 1990	(England) Jimmy Phillips	Oxford United	£257,000
January 1990	(England) Ian Baird	Leeds United	£500,000
September 1989	(Republic of Ireland) Simon Coleman	Mansfield Town	Undisclosed

=== Out ===
Date	Player	New Club	Fee
August 1989	(England) Gary Pallister	Manchester United	£2,340,000

== Final league table ==
Pos	Team	Pld	W	D	L	GF	GA	GD	Pts	Qualification or relegation
19	Barnsley	46	13	15	18	49	71	−22	54	
20	West Bromwich Albion	46	12	15	19	67	71	−4	51	
21	Middlesbrough	46	13	11	22	52	63	−11	50	
22	Bournemouth (R)	46	12	12	22	57	76	−19	48	Relegation to the Third Division
23	Bradford City (R)	46	9	14	23	44	68	−24	41	Relegation to the Third Division

Source: Statto
Rules for classification: 1) Points; 2) Goal difference; 3) Goals scored
(R) Relegated

== Results ==
=== Football League Second Division ===
19 August 1989 1	Middlesbrough	4–2	Wolves	Middlesbrough
	Proctor; Davenport; Slaven (2)			Stadium: Ayresome Park; Attendance: 21,727

23 August 1989 2	Leeds United	2–1	Middlesbrough	Leeds
			Alan Comfort	Stadium: Elland Road; Attendance: 25,004

27 August 1989 3	Sunderland	2–1	Middlesbrough	Sunderland
			Slaven	Stadium: Roker Park; Attendance: 21,569

2 September 1989 4	Middlesbrough	3–3	Sheffield United	Middlesbrough
	Alan Comfort; Slaven (2)			Stadium: Ayresome Park; Attendance: 17,897

9 September 1989 5	Barnsley	1–1	Middlesbrough	Barnsley
			Burke	Stadium: Oakwell; Attendance: 10,535

16 September 1989 6	Middlesbrough	2–1	Bournemouth	Middlesbrough
	Proctor; Slaven			Stadium: Ayresome Park; Attendance: 16,077

23 September 1989 7	Portsmouth	3–1	Middlesbrough	Portsmouth
			Slaven	Stadium: Fratton Park; Attendance: 7,306

27 September 1989 8	Middlesbrough	1–0	Hull	Middlesbrough
	Proctor			Stadium: Ayresome Park; Attendance: 16,382

30 September 1989 9	Watford	1–0	Middlesbrough	Portsmouth
				Stadium: Vicarage Road; Attendance: 10,102

14 October 1989 10	Middlesbrough	0–2	Plymouth	Middlesbrough
	Proctor			Stadium: Ayresome Park; Attendance: 15,003

18 October 1989 11	Middlesbrough	2–2	Brighton	Middlesbrough
	Parkinson; Mowbray			Stadium: Ayresome Park; Attendance: 13,551

21 October 1989 12	Oldham	2–0	Middlesbrough	Oldham
				Stadium: Boundary Park; Attendance: 6,835

28 October 1989 13	Middlesbrough	0–0	West Brom	Middlesbrough
				Stadium: Ayresome Park; Attendance: 14,076

30 October 1989 14	Port Vale	1–1	Middlesbrough	Stoke-on-Trent
			Alan Kernaghan	Stadium: Vale Park; Attendance: 7,708

4 November 1989 15	Newcastle	2–2	Middlesbrough	Newcastle Upon Tyne
	McGhee; O'Brien		Proctor; Brennan	Stadium: St James' Park; Attendance: 23,349

11 November 1989 16	Middlesbrough	0–2	Swindon	Middlesbrough
				Stadium: Ayresome Park; Attendance: 13,720

18 November 1989 17	West Ham	2–0	Middlesbrough	London
	Dicks; Slater			Stadium: Upton Park; Attendance: 18,720

21 November 1989 18	Blackburn Rovers	2–4	Middlesbrough	Blackburn
			Kernaghan (3); Slaven	Stadium: Ewood Park; Attendance: 18,720

25 November 1989 19	Middlesbrough	1–0	Oxford United	Middlesbrough
	Slaven			Stadium: Ayresome Park; Attendance: 13,756

2 December 1989 20	Wolverhampton Wanderers	2–0	Middlesbrough	Wolverhampton
				Stadium: Molineux; Attendance: 12,357

9 December 1989 21	Middlesbrough	0–2	Leeds United	Middlesbrough
				Stadium: Ayresome Park; Attendance: 19,686

16 December 1989 22	Middlesbrough	4–1	Leicester City	Middlesbrough
	Cooper (2); Slaven; Ripley		McAllister (pen.)	Stadium: Ayresome Park; Attendance: 11,428

26 December 1989 23	Bradford City	0–1	Middlesbrough	Bradford
			Slaven	Stadium: Valley Parade; Attendance: 10,008

30 December 1989 24	Ipswich Town	3–0	Middlesbrough	Ipswich
				Stadium: Portman Road; Attendance: 14,290

1 January 1990 25	Middlesbrough	0–1	Stoke City	Middlesbrough
				Stadium: Ayresome Park; Attendance: 16,238

14 January 1990 26	Middlesbrough	3–0	Sunderland	Middlesbrough
	Parkinson; Davenport; Slaven			Stadium: Ayresome Park; Attendance: 17,698

20 January 1990 27	Sheffield United	1–0	Middlesbrough	Sheffield
				Stadium: Bramall Lane; Attendance: 15,950

3 February 1990 28	Middlesbrough	2–0	Portsmouth	Middlesbrough
	Kerr; Slaven			Stadium: Ayresome Park; Attendance: 15,295

10 February 1990 29	Bournemouth	2–2	Middlesbrough	Bournemouth
			Mowbray; Slaven	Stadium: Dean Court; Attendance: 7,630

10 February 1990 30	Oxford United	3–1	Middlesbrough	Oxford
			Brennan	Stadium: Manor Ground; Attendance: 5,949

10 February 1990 31	Brighton	1–0	Middlesbrough	Brighton
				Stadium: Goldstone Ground; Attendance: 5,504

3 March 1990 32	Middlesbrough	0–1	West Ham	Middlesbrough
			Martin Allen	Stadium: Ayresome Park; Attendance: 23,617

7 March 1990 33	Middlesbrough	1–2	Watford	Middlesbrough
	Simon Coleman			Stadium: Ayresome Park; Attendance: 14,008

10 March 1990 34	Hull City	0–0	Middlesbrough	Kingston Upon Hull
				Stadium: Boothferry Park; Attendance: 6,602

17 March 1990 35	Middlesbrough	0–3	Blackburn Rovers	Middlesbrough
				Stadium: Ayresome Park; Attendance: 15,259

20 March 1990 36	Plymouth Argyle	1–2	Middlesbrough	Plymouth
			Baird; Brennan	Stadium: Home Park; Attendance: 7,185

17 March 1990 37	Middlesbrough	1–0	Oldham Athletic	Middlesbrough
	Slaven			Stadium: Ayresome Park; Attendance: 17,238

7 April 1990 38	West Brom	0–0	Middlesbrough	West Bromwich
				Stadium: The Hawthorns; Attendance: 9,458

11 April 1990 39	Middlesbrough	2–3	Port Vale	Middlesbrough
	Davenport; Slaven			Stadium: Ayresome Park; Attendance: 14,973

14 April 1990 40	Stoke City	0–0	Middlesbrough	Stoke on Trent
				Stadium: Victoria Ground; Attendance: 8,636

16 April 1990 41	Middlesbrough	2–0	Bradford City	Middlesbrough
	Baird; Slaven			Stadium: Ayresome Park; Attendance: 16,376

21 April 1990 42	Leicester City	2–1	Middlesbrough	Leicester
	Kelly (2)		Slaven	Stadium: Filbert Street; Attendance: 9,203

25 April 1990 43	Middlesbrough	1–2	Ipswich Town	Middlesbrough
	Baird			Stadium: Ayresome Park; Attendance: 15,232

28 April 1990 44	Swindon Town	1–1	Middlesbrough	Swindon
			Slaven	Stadium: County Ground; Attendance: 9,532

2 May 1990 45	Middlesbrough	0–1	Barnsley	Middlesbrough
				Stadium: Ayresome Park; Attendance: 17,015

9 May 1990 46	Middlesbrough	4–1	Newcastle United	Middlesbrough
	Baird (2); Slaven (2)		McGee (o.g.)	Stadium: Ayresome Park; Attendance: 18,484

=== FA Cup ===
6 January 1990 Third round	Middlesbrough	0–0	Everton	Ayresome Park, Middlesbrough
				Attendance: 20,075

10 January 1990 Third round replay	Everton	1–1 (a.e.t.)	Middlesbrough	Goodison Park, Liverpool
	Sheedy		Parkinson	Attendance: 24,352

17 January 1990 Third round second replay	Everton	1–0	Middlesbrough	Goodison Park, Liverpool
	Whiteside			Attendance: 23,866

=== League Cup ===
20 September 1989 Second round First leg	Middlesbrough	4–0	Halifax Town	Ayresome Park, Middlesbrough
	Kernaghan; Comfort; Slaven (2)			Attendance: 10,613

3 October 1989 Second round Second leg	Halifax Town	0–1	Middlesbrough	The Shay, Halifax
			Slaven	Attendance: 1,641

25 October 1989 Third round	Middlesbrough	1–1	Wimbledon	Ayresome Park, Middlesbrough
	Slaven			Attendance: 12,933

8 November 1989 Third round replay	Wimbledon	1–0	Middlesbrough	Plough Lane, London
				Attendance: 3,554

=== Full Members' Cup ===
29 November 1989 Second round	Middlesbrough	3–1	Port Vale	Ayresome Park, Middlesbrough
				Attendance: 6,691

3 October 1989 Third round	Middlesbrough	4–1	Sheffield Wednesday	Ayresome Park, Middlesbrough
				Attendance: 8,176

23 January 1990 Semi final Northern section	Middlesbrough	1–0	Newcastle United	Ayresome Park, Middlesbrough
				Attendance: 16,948

30 January 1990 Final; Northern section First leg	Aston Villa	1–2	Middlesbrough	Villa Park, Birmingham
				Attendance: 16,547

6 February 1990 Final; Northern section Second leg	Middlesbrough	2–1 (a.e.t.)	Aston Villa	Ayresome Park, Middlesbrough
				Attendance: 20,806

25 March 1990 Final	Chelsea	1–0	Middlesbrough	Wembley, London
	Dorigo 26'			Attendance: 76,369
