= 1991–92 Middlesbrough F.C. season =

Middlesbrough
1991–92 season
- Chairman: Colin Henderson
- Manager: Lennie Lawrence
- Stadium: Ayresome Park
- Second Division: 2nd (promoted)
- FA Cup: Fifth round
- League Cup: Semi finals
- Full Members' Cup: Quarter finals
- Top goalscorer: League: Slaven (16); All: Wilkinson (24)
- Average home league attendance: 14,703

During the 1991–92 English football season, Middlesbrough F.C. competed in the Football League Second Division.

== Season summary ==
In the 1991–92 season, Lawrence's first season at the helm was a success, with Boro reaching the League Cup semi-finals for the second time and most significantly finishing runners-up in the Second Division and booking their place in the inaugural Premier League.

== Final league table ==
Pos	Team	Pld	W	D	L	GF	GA	GD	Pts	Qualification or relegation
1	Ipswich Town (C, P)	46	24	12	10	70	50	+20	84	Promotion to the FA Premier League
2	Middlesbrough (P)	46	23	11	12	58	41	+17	80	Promotion to the FA Premier League
3	Derby County	46	23	9	14	69	51	+18	78	Qualification for the Second Division play-offs
4	Leicester City	46	23	8	15	62	55	+7	77	Qualification for the Second Division play-offs
5	Cambridge United	46	19	17	10	65	47	+18	74	Qualification for the Second Division play-offs

Rules for classification: 1) Points; 2) Goal difference; 3) Goals scored
(C) Champions; (P) Promoted

== Results ==
Middlesbrough's score comes first

=== Legend ===
Win	Draw	Loss

=== Football League Second Division ===
Date	Opponent	Venue	Result	Attendance	Scorers
17 August 1991	Millwall	H	1–0	16,234	Mustoe
21 August 1991	Derby County	A	0–2	12,805	
24 August 1991	Ipswich Town	A	1–2	9,822	Wilkinson
27 August 1991	Newcastle United	H	3–0	16,970	Falconer, Proctor, Wilkinson
31 August 1991	Portsmouth	H	2–0	12,230	Falconer, Slaven
4 September 1991	Oxford United	A	2–1	4,229	Slaven (2)
7 September 1991	Watford	A	2–1	8,715	Falconer, Wilkinson
14 September 1991	Leicester City	H	3–0	16,633	Wilkinson (2), Slaven
17 September 1991	Tranmere Rovers	H	1–0	16,550	Falconer
21 September 1991	Plymouth Argyle	A	1–1	5,280	Wilkinson
28 September 1991	Sunderland	H	2–1	19,424	Wilkinson, Slaven
5 October 1991	Bristol Rovers	A	1–2	4,936	Yates (own goal)
12 October 1991	Wolverhampton Wanderers	H	0–0	15,253	
19 October 1991	Grimsby Town	A	0–1	10,265	
26 October 1991	Port Vale	H	1–0	11,403	Kernaghan
2 November 1991	Southend United	H	1–1	9,664	Ripley
5 November 1991	Barnsley	A	1–2	6,525	Slaven
9 November 1991	Brighton & Hove Albion	A	1–1	8,270	Slaven (pen)
16 November 1991	Charlton Athletic	H	2–0	13,093	Mohan, Slaven
23 November 1991	Bristol City	H	3–1	12,928	Payton, Slaven (2)
30 November 1991	Blackburn Rovers	A	1–2	15,541	Slaven (pen)
7 December 1991	Swindon Town	H	2–2	13,300	Wilkinson, Slaven
26 December 1991	Newcastle United	A	1–0	26,563	Wilkinson
28 December 1991	Portsmouth	A	0–4	13,344	
1 January 1992	Derby County	H	1–1	16,288	Mohan
11 January 1992	Ipswich Town	H	1–0	15,104	Payton
18 January 1992	Millwall	A	0–2	8,125	
8 February 1992	Port Vale	A	2–1	7,019	Hendrie, Mustoe
22 February 1992	Blackburn Rovers	H	0–0	19,353	
29 February 1992	Swindon Town	A	1–0	10,379	Kernaghan
7 March 1992	Cambridge United	H	1–1	14,686	Wilkinson
14 March 1992	Southend United	A	1–0	7,272	Slaven (pen)
17 March 1992	Cambridge United	A	0–0	7,318	
21 March 1992	Brighton & Hove Albion	H	4–0	13,054	Hendrie, Slaven (3, 1 pen)
28 March 1992	Charlton Athletic	A	0–0	8,250	
1 April 1992	Leicester City	A	1–2	19,352	Pollock
4 April 1992	Watford	H	1–2	13,669	Wilkinson
7 April 1992	Bristol City	A	1–1	12,814	Hendrie
10 April 1992	Tranmere Rovers	A	2–1	8,842	Proctor, Phillips
13 April 1992	Barnsley	H	0–1	12,743	
15 April 1992	Oxford United	H	2–1	11,928	Ripley, Payton
18 April 1992	Plymouth Argyle	H	2–1	15,086	Falconer, Ripley
20 April 1992	Sunderland	A	0–1	25,098	
25 April 1992	Bristol Rovers	H	2–1	14,057	Wilkinson (2)
28 April 1992	Grimsby Town	H	2–0	18,570	Phillips (pen), Wilkinson
2 May 1992	Wolverhampton Wanderers	A	2–1	19,123	Gittens, Wilkinson

=== FA Cup ===
Round	Date	Opponent	Venue	Result	Attendance	Goalscorers
R3	4 January 1992	Manchester City	H	2–1	15,564	Kernaghan 80', Wilkinson 81'
R4	4 February 1992	Sheffield Wednesday	A	2–1	29,772	Hendrie, Wilkinson
R5	15 February 1992	Portsmouth	A	1–1	18,138	Kernaghan
R5R	26 February 1992	Portsmouth	H	2–4	19,479	Wilkinson (2)

=== League Cup ===
Round	Date	Opponent	Venue	Result	Attendance	Goalscorers
R2 1st Leg	24 September 1991	Bournemouth	H	1–1	10,577	Wilkinson
R2 2nd Leg	8 October 1991	Bournemouth	A	2–1 (won 3–2 on agg)	5,528	Parkinson (pen), Hendrie
R3	29 October 1991	Barnsley	H	1–0	9,381	Wilkinson
R4	3 December 1991	Manchester City	H	2–1	17,286	Mustoe, Wilkinson
QF	8 January 1992	Peterborough United	A	0–0	15,302	
QFR	12 February 1992	Peterborough United	H	1–0	21,973	Ripley
SF 1st Leg	4 March 1992	Manchester United	H	0–0	25,572	
SF 2nd Leg	11 March 1992	Manchester United	A	1–2 (lost 1–2 on agg)	45,875	Slaven 51'

=== Full Members' Cup ===
Round	Date	Opponent	Venue	Result	Attendance	Goalscorers
NR2	22 October 1991	Derby County	H	4–2 (a.e.t.)	6,385	Wilkinson (2), Phillips, Slaven
NQF	26 November 1991	Tranmere Rovers	H	0–1	6,592	

== Squad ==
Note: Flags indicate national team as defined under FIFA eligibility rules; some limited exceptions apply. Players may hold more than one non-FIFA nationality.

Pos.	Nation	Player
GK	ENG	Stephen Pears
DF	ENG	Jimmy Phillips
DF	IRL	Alan Kernaghan
DF	ENG	Nicky Mohan
DF	ENG	Gary Parkinson
MF	ENG	Stuart Ripley
MF	ENG	Robbie Mustoe
MF	ENG	Jamie Pollock
MF	ENG	Mark Proctor
FW	ENG	Paul Wilkinson
FW	SCO	John Hendrie
FW	IRL	Bernie Slaven
GK	ENG	Ian Ironside
FW	SCO	Willie Falconer
DF	IRL	Curtis Fleming

Pos.	Nation	Player
MF	ENG	Andy Peake
DF	ENG	Tony Mowbray
DF	ENG	Jon Gittens
FW	ENG	Andy Payton
MF	ENG	Brian Marwood (on loan from Sheffield United)
DF	SCO	Rab Shannon (on loan from Dundee)
FW	ENG	Ian Arnold
MF	SCO	John Hewitt (on loan from Celtic)
MF	ENG	Michael Young
GK	ENG	Andy Collett
DF	ENG	Phil Gilchrist
MF	IRL	Graham Kavanagh
MF	IRL	Alan Moore
MF	ENG	Andy McSorley
