= 1992–93 Middlesbrough F.C. season =

Middlesbrough
1992–93 season
- Chairman: Colin Henderson
- Manager: Lennie Lawrence
- Stadium: Ayresome Park
- Premier League: 21st (relegated)
- FA Cup: Fourth round
- League Cup: Second round
- Top goalscorer: Wilkinson (15)
- Average home league attendance: 16,724
Home colours	Away colours	Third colours

During the 1992–93 English football season, Middlesbrough competed in the inaugural season of the Premier League. It was Middlesbrough's first season in the top flight since relegation in 1988; Middlesbrough regained promotion to England's top flight by finishing second in the old Second Division (renamed the First Division after the foundation of the Premier League).

== Season summary ==
Middlesbrough enjoyed a good start to the season, winning four of their first seven games – including a superb 4–1 home win over Yorkshire rivals and reigning champions Leeds United – a run that sent them sixth in the table. Unfortunately, they couldn't quite keep up the momentum but still, up to their thrilling 3–2 victory over Blackburn Rovers on 5 December 1992, they enjoyed stable mid-table form, winning six, drawing six and losing six of their first 18 games. Unfortunately, three consecutive draws followed and from then, starting from a 1–0 home defeat to strugglers Crystal Palace before the new year, the club struggled and went into freefall during the entire second half of the season, winning just three of their next 18 fixtures and picking up just ten points from a possible 54, a run that ultimately resulted in the club's relegation looking inevitable with three matches left.

However, a 3–0 win over Tottenham Hotspur gave them a very slim glimmer of hope for an unlikely survival; on the other hand, they would never look like pulling off the 'great escape' that relegation rivals Oldham Athletic would soon perfect. With just two matches left, they were already three points adrift of Sheffield United and five adrift of Crystal Palace, both having a game in hand. Despite a 3–2 win at Sheffield Wednesday, results went against them: Palace beating Ipswich Town 3–1, Sheffield United condemning Nottingham Forest to relegation by winning 2–0 at the City Ground and Oldham stunning title chasers Aston Villa 1–0 at Villa Park which also saw Manchester United clinching their first top-flight title for 26 years. With these results, Middlesbrough were left with a virtually impossible survival task, with only one game left and were three points adrift of Sheffield United who had two games left with a vastly superior goal difference of −3 against Boro's −21. They needed the Blades to lose both of their final games with a miracle 18-goal swing and to beat third-placed Norwich City in their final game for any chance of survival. Sadly, Boro's relegation was confirmed before a ball was kicked on their closing fixture as the Blades beat Everton 2–0 at Goodison Park. A 3–3 draw with Norwich City for Boro at least meant that they finished a difficult season on a high note in the final three games, going down fighting, and it gave them a glimpse of positivity in gaining promotion back to the Premier League at the first attempt for next season. They finished in 21st place, five points adrift of safety.

== Kit ==
Middlesbrough's kit was manufactured by Admiral. The shirt sponsor was Imperial Chemical Industries.

== Final league table ==
Pos	Team	Pld	W	D	L	GF	GA	GD	Pts	Qualification or relegation
18	Southampton	42	13	11	18	54	61	−7	50	
19	Oldham Athletic	42	13	10	19	63	74	−11	49	
20	Crystal Palace (R)	42	11	16	15	48	61	−13	49	Relegation to Football League First Division
21	Middlesbrough (R)	42	11	11	20	54	75	−21	44	Relegation to Football League First Division
22	Nottingham Forest (R)	42	10	10	22	41	62	−21	40	Relegation to Football League First Division

Source: Premier League
Rules for classification: 1) points; 2) goal difference; 3) number of goals scored.
(R) Relegated

== Results ==
=== Premier League ===
Premier League match results
Date	Opponents	Home/ Away	Result F–A	Scorers	Attendance
15 August 1992	Coventry City	A	1–2	Wilkinson	12,681
19 August 1992	Manchester City	H	2–0	Slaven (2)	15,369
22 August 1992	Leeds United	H	4–1	Wilkinson (2), Wright, Hendrie	18,649
29 August 1992	Southampton	A	1–2	Wilkinson	13,003
1 September 1992	Ipswich Town	H	2–2	Kernaghan, Wilkinson	14,255
5 September 1992	Sheffield United	H	2–0	Falconer, Wright	15,179
12 September 1992	Manchester City	A	1–0	Flitcroft (o.g.)	25,244
19 September 1992	Queens Park Rangers	A	3–3	Kernaghan, Wright, Falconer	12,272
26 September 1992	Aston Villa	H	2–3	Slaven, McGrath (o.g.)	20,905
3 October 1992	Manchester United	H	1–1	Slaven	24,172
17 October 1992	Tottenham Hotspur	A	2–2	Mustoe, Wilkinson	24,735
21 October 1992	Nottingham Forest	A	0–1		17,846
24 October 1992	Sheffield Wednesday	H	1–1	Wilkinson	18,414
31 October 1992	Norwich City	A	1–1	Wilkinson	14,499
7 November 1992	Liverpool	A	1–4	Phillips (pen.)	34,974
21 November 1992	Wimbledon	H	2–0	Hendrie, Morris	14,524
28 November 1992	Oldham Athletic	A	1–4	Falconer	12,401
5 December 1992	Blackburn Rovers	H	3–2	Hendrie (3)	20,096
11 December 1992	Chelsea	H	0–0		15,599
19 December 1992	Arsenal	A	1–1	Seaman (o.g.)	23,197
26 December 1992	Everton	A	2–2	Hignett (2)	24,391
28 December 1992	Crystal Palace	H	0–1		21,123
9 January 1993	Queens Park Rangers	H	0–1		15,616
17 January 1993	Aston Villa	A	1–5	Hignett	19,977
26 January 1993	Southampton	H	2–1	Mohan, Wilkinson	13,918
30 January 1993	Leeds United	A	0–3		30,344
6 February 1993	Coventry City	H	0–2		14,008
9 February 1993	Sheffield United	A	0–2		15,184
20 February 1993	Nottingham Forest	H	1–2	Phillips	15,639
27 February 1993	Manchester United	A	0–3		36,251
2 March 1993	Ipswich Town	A	1–0	Wilkinson	15,430
9 March 1993	Wimbledon	A	0–2		5,821
13 March 1993	Liverpool	H	1–2	Nicol (o.g.)	22,463
20 March 1993	Blackburn Rovers	A	1–1	Hendrie	14,041
22 March 1993	Oldham Athletic	H	2–3	Mohan, Hignett	12,290
3 April 1993	Chelsea	A	0–4		13,043
6 April 1993	Arsenal	H	1–0	Hendrie	12,726
10 April 1993	Everton	H	1–2	Wilkinson	16,627
12 April 1993	Crystal Palace	A	1–4	Wilkinson	15,123
20 April 1993	Tottenham Hotspur	H	3–0	Wright (2), Wilkinson	14,472
1 May 1993	Sheffield Wednesday	A	3–2	Falconer, Pollock, Hendrie	25,949
8 May 1993	Norwich City	H	3–3	Falconer, Wilkinson, Hendrie	15,155

=== FA Cup ===
FA Cup match results
Date	Round	Opponents	H / A	Result F–A	Scorers	Attendance
13 January 1993	Third round	Chelsea	H	2–1	Wright, Falconer	16,776
23 January 1993	Fourth round	Nottingham Forest	A	1–1	Falconer	22,296
3 February 1992	Fourth round replay	Nottingham Forest	H	0–3		20,514

=== League Cup ===
League Cup match results
Date	Round	Opponents	H / A	Result F–A	Scorers	Attendance
23 September 1992	Second round, first leg	Newcastle United	A	0–0		25,814
7 October 1992	Second round, second leg	Newcastle United	H	1–3	Wilkinson	24,390

== First-team squad ==
Note: Flags indicate national team as defined under FIFA eligibility rules; some limited exceptions apply. Players may hold more than one non-FIFA nationality.

Pos.	Nation	Player
GK	ENG	Andy Collett
GK	ENG	Brian Horne (on loan from Millwall)
GK	ENG	Ian Ironside
GK	ENG	Stephen Pears
GK	ENG	Ben Roberts
DF	ENG	Michael Barron
DF	IRL	Curtis Fleming
DF	ENG	Phil Gilchrist
DF	ENG	Jon Gittens
DF	ENG	Chris Kamara (on loan from Luton Town)
DF	ENG	Alan Kernaghan (captain)
DF	ENG	Richard Liburd
DF	ENG	Nicky Mohan
DF	IRL	Chris Morris
DF	ENG	Gary Parkinson
DF	ENG	Jimmy Phillips
DF	ENG	Andy Todd
DF	SCO	Derek Whyte

Pos.	Nation	Player
MF	IRL	Graham Kavanagh
MF	IRL	Alan Moore
MF	ENG	Robbie Mustoe
MF	ENG	Michael Oliver
MF	ENG	Andy Peake
MF	ENG	Jamie Pollock
MF	ENG	Mark Proctor
MF	ENG	Phil Stamp
MF	ENG	Tommy Wright
FW	SCO	Willie Falconer
FW	SCO	John Hendrie
FW	ENG	Craig Hignett
FW	ENG	Neil Illman
FW	LCA	Dwight Marshall (on loan from Plymouth Argyle)
FW	IRL	Bernie Slaven
FW	ENG	Paul Wilkinson
