= 1988–89 Middlesbrough F.C. season =

English football club season

Middlesbrough
1988–89 season
- Chairman: Colin Henderson
- Manager: Bruce Rioch
- Stadium: Ayresome Park
- First Division: 18th
- FA Cup: Third round
- League Cup: Second round
- Simod Cup: Fourth round
- Top goalscorer: League: Slaven (15); All: Slaven (18)
- Highest home attendance: 25,197 (vs Liverpool, 11 March 1989)
- Lowest home attendance: 6,853 (vs Portsmouth, 21 December 1988)

During the 1988–89 English football season, Middlesbrough finished third from bottom in the Football League First Division and were relegated after just one season.

After a decent first half of the season, having occupied seventh place in November, they won just one of their last 17 League matches and fell into the relegation places on the final day of the season after losing 1–0 to Sheffield Wednesday. Bernie Slaven was one of the First Division's top scorers with 15 goals in the League, but Peter Davenport scored just four times after signing from Manchester United.

Middlesbrough were eliminated from both the FA Cup and the League Cup at the round they entered each competition. They were beaten by lower league opposition, Grimsby Town and Tranmere Rovers respectively.

== League table ==
Pos	Team	Pld	W	D	L	GF	GA	GD	Pts	Qualification or relegation
16	Luton Town	38	10	11	17	42	52	−10	41	
17	Aston Villa	38	9	13	16	45	56	−11	40	
18	Middlesbrough (R)	38	9	12	17	44	61	−17	39	Relegation to the Second Division
19	West Ham United (R)	38	10	8	20	37	62	−25	38	Relegation to the Second Division
20	Newcastle United (R)	38	7	10	21	32	63	−31	31	Relegation to the Second Division

Source: World Football
Rules for classification: 1) Points; 2) Goal difference; 3) Goals scored
(R) Relegated

== Results ==
=== Football League First Division ===
27 August 1988 1	Derby County	1–0	Middlesbrough	Derby
				Stadium: Baseball Ground; Attendance: 19,432

3 September 1988 2	Middlesbrough	2–3	Norwich City	Middlesbrough
	Mowbray; Burke			Stadium: Ayresome Park; Attendance: 18,595

10 September 1988 3	Manchester United	1–0	Middlesbrough	Manchester
				Stadium: Old Trafford; Attendance: 40,442

17 September 1988 4	Middlesbrough	1–0	Wimbledon	Middlesbrough
	Hamilton			Stadium: Ayresome Park; Attendance: 17,709

24 September 1988 5	Tottenham Hotspur	3–2	Middlesbrough	London
			Slaven; Mowbray	Stadium: White Hart Lane; Attendance: 23,427

1 October 1988 6	Coventry City	3–4	Middlesbrough	Coventry
			Slaven; Burke	Stadium: Highfield Road; Attendance: 14,527

8 October 1988 7	Middlesbrough	1–0	West Ham United	Middlesbrough
	Pallister			Stadium: Ayresome Park; Attendance: 19,608

22 October 1988 8	Middlesbrough	2–1	Luton Town	Middlesbrough
	Slaven; Cooper			Stadium: Ayresome Park; Attendance: 17,792

26 October 1988 9	Newcastle United	3–0	Middlesbrough	Newcastle upon Tyne
				Stadium: St James' Park; Attendance: 23,927

29 October 1988 10	Middlesbrough	4–2	Millwall	Middlesbrough
	Slaven; Ripley; Burke; Parkinson			Stadium: Ayresome Park; Attendance: 19,788

5 November 1988 11	Liverpool	3–0	Middlesbrough	Liverpool
	Rush; Aldridge; Beardsley			Stadium: Anfield; Attendance: 39,489

12 November 1988 12	Middlesbrough	1–0	Queens Park Rangers	Middlesbrough
	Brennan			Stadium: Ayresome Park; Attendance: 20,565

19 November 1988 13	Arsenal	3–0	Middlesbrough	London
	Merson; Rocastle			Stadium: Highbury; Attendance: 32,294

26 November 1988 14	Middlesbrough	0–1	Sheffield Wednesday	Middlesbrough
				Stadium: Ayresome Park; Attendance: 19,310

3 December 1988 15	Nottingham Forest	2–2	Middlesbrough	Nottingham
			Brennan; Ripley	Stadium: City Ground; Attendance: 17,742

10 December 1988 16	Middlesbrough	3–3	Aston Villa	Middlesbrough
	Brennan; Hamilton; Mowbray			Stadium: Ayresome Park; Attendance: 18,096

17 December 1988 17	Middlesbrough	0–0	Charlton Athletic	Middlesbrough
				Stadium: Ayresome Park; Attendance: 16,065

26 December 1988 18	Everton	2–1	Middlesbrough	Liverpool
			Glover	Stadium: Goodison Park; Attendance: 32,651

31 December 1988 19	Norwich City	0–0	Middlesbrough	Norwich
				Stadium: Carrow Road; Attendance: 16,021

2 January 1989 20	Middlesbrough	1–0	Manchester United	Middlesbrough
	Davenport			Stadium: Ayresome Park; Attendance: 24,411

14 January 1989 21	Southampton	1–3	Middlesbrough	Southampton
			Kerr; Slaven; Burke	Stadium: The Dell; Attendance: 13,157

21 January 1989 22	Middlesbrough	2–2	Tottenham Hotspur	Middlesbrough
	Cooper; Ripley			Stadium: Ayresome Park; Attendance: 23,691

4 February 1989 23	Middlesbrough	1–1	Coventry City	Middlesbrough
	Slaven			Stadium: Ayresome Park; Attendance: 17,352

18 February 1989 24	Luton Town	1–0	Middlesbrough	Luton
				Stadium: Kenilworth Road; Attendance: 8,187

21 February 1989 25	Millwall	2–0	Middlesbrough	London
				Stadium: The Den; Attendance: 11,396

26 February 1989 26	Middlesbrough	1–1	Newcastle United	Middlesbrough
	Slaven			Stadium: Ayresome Park; Attendance: 24,385

11 March 1989 27	Middlesbrough	0–4	Liverpool	Middlesbrough
			Beardsley; Houghton; Aldridge; McMahon	Stadium: Ayresome Park; Attendance: 25,197

18 March 1989 28	Middlesbrough	0–1	Derby County	Middlesbrough
				Stadium: Ayresome Park; Attendance: 16,580

25 March 1989 29	Wimbledon	1–1	Middlesbrough	London
			Slaven	Stadium: Plough Lane; Attendance: 11,396

27 March 1989 30	Middlesbrough	3–3	Everton	Middlesbrough
	Slaven; Parkinson; Davenport			Stadium: Ayresome Park; Attendance: 23,151

1 April 1989 31	Charlton Athletic	2–0	Middlesbrough	London
				Stadium: Selhurst Park; Attendance: 6,696

8 April 1989 32	Middlesbrough	3–3	Southampton	Middlesbrough
	Hamilton; Slaven; Burke			Stadium: Ayresome Park; Attendance: 16,983

11 April 1989 33	West Ham United	1–2	Middlesbrough	London
	Keen		Slaven	Stadium: Upton Park; Attendance: 16,217

18 April 1989 34	Queens Park Rangers	0–0	Middlesbrough	London
				Stadium: Loftus Road; Attendance: 10,347

22 April 1989 35	Middlesbrough	3–4	Nottingham Forest	Middlesbrough
	Ripley; Slaven; Davenport			Stadium: Ayresome Park; Attendance: 20,778

29 April 1989 36	Aston Villa	1–1	Middlesbrough	Birmingham
			Davenport	Stadium: Villa Park; Attendance: 18,590

6 May 1989 37	Middlesbrough	0–1	Arsenal	Middlesbrough
			Hayes	Stadium: Ayresome Park; Attendance: 21,803

13 May 1989 38	Sheffield Wednesday	1–0	Middlesbrough	Sheffield
				Stadium: Hillsborough; Attendance: 20,582

=== FA Cup ===
7 January 1989 3	Middlesbrough	1–2	Grimsby Town	Middlesbrough
	Slaven			Stadium: Ayresome Park; Attendance: 19,190

=== League Cup ===
28 September 1988 2 (1st leg)	Middlesbrough	0–0	Tranmere Rovers	Middlesbrough
				Stadium: Ayresome Park; Attendance: 12,084

11 October 1988 2 (2nd leg)	Tranmere Rovers	1–0	Middlesbrough	Birkenhead
				Stadium: Prenton Park; Attendance: 8,617

=== Simod Cup ===
14 December 1988 1	Middlesbrough	1–0	Oldham Athletic	Middlesbrough
	Glover			Stadium: Ayresome Park; Attendance: 7,439

21 December 1988 2	Middlesbrough	2–1	Portsmouth	Middlesbrough
	Slaven; Glover			Stadium: Ayresome Park; Attendance: 6,853

11 January 1989 3	Middlesbrough	1–0	Coventry City	Middlesbrough
	Davenport			Stadium: Ayresome Park; Attendance: 9,910

28 January 1989 4	Middlesbrough	2–3	Crystal Palace	Middlesbrough
	Slaven; Cooper			Stadium: Ayresome Park; Attendance: 16,314

== Squad ==
=== Appearances and goals ===
Appearance and goalscoring records for all the players who were in the Middlesbrough F.C. first team squad during the 1988–89 season.

No.	Pos	Nat	Player	Total		Division 1		FA Cup		League Cup		Simod Cup	
No.	Pos	Nat	Player	Apps	Goals	Apps	Goals	Apps	Goals	Apps	Goals	Apps	Goals
	GK	(England) ENG	Stephen Pears	33	0	26	0	1	0	2	0	4	0
	GK	(England) ENG	Kevin Poole	12	0	12	0	0	0	0	0	0	0
	DF	(England) ENG	Colin Cooper	42	2	35	2	1	0	2	0	4	0
	DF	(Republic of Ireland) IRL	Alan Kernaghan	26	0	23	0	0	0	2	0	1	0
	DF	(England) ENG	Nicky Mohan	8	0	6	0	1	0	0	0	1	0
	DF	(England) ENG	Tony Mowbray	44	3	37	3	1	0	2	0	4	0
	DF	(England) ENG	Gary Pallister	44	1	37	1	1	0	2	0	4	0
	DF	(England) ENG	Gary Parkinson	41	2	36	2	0	0	2	0	3	0
	MF	(England) ENG	Mark Barham	4	0	4	0	0	0	0	0	0	0
	MF	(England) ENG	Mark Brennan	31	3	25	3	1	0	2	0	3	0
	MF	(England) ENG	Mark Burke	33	5	29	5	1	0	1	0	2	0
	MF	(England) ENG	Gary Gill	10	0	8	0	0	0	1	0	1	0
	MF	(England) ENG	Dean Glover	15	3	12	1	1	0	0	0	2	2
	MF	(Scotland) SCO	Gary Hamilton	43	3	36	3	1	0	2	0	4	0
	MF	(England) ENG	Paul Kerr	24	1	20	1	0	0	2	0	2	0
	MF	(England) ENG	Mark Proctor	10	0	10	0	0	0	0	0	0	0
	MF	(England) ENG	Stuart Ripley	42	4	36	4	1	0	2	0	3	0
	FW	(England) ENG	Peter Davenport	28	5	24	4	1	0	0	0	3	1
	FW	(England) ENG	Paul Proudlock	1	0	1	0	0	0	0	0	0	0
	FW	(England) ENG	Trevor Senior	5	0	4	0	0	0	1	0	0	0
	FW	(Republic of Ireland) IRL	Bernie Slaven	44	18	37	15	1	1	2	0	4	2
