= Bernie Slaven =

Ireland international footballer

Personal information
- Full name: Bernard Joseph Slaven
- Date of birth: 13 November 1960 (age 65)
- Place of birth: Paisley, Renfrewshire, Scotland
- Height: 5 ft 10 in (1.78 m)
- Position: Forward

Youth career
- 1975–197?: Partick Thistle Amateurs
- 197?–1979: Eastercraigs
- 1979–1980: Johnstone Burgh
- 1980–1981: Rutherglen Glencairn

Senior career*
Years	Team	Apps	(Gls)
1981–1983	Greenock Morton	21	(1)
1983	Airdrieonians	2	(0)
1983	Queen of the South	2	(0)
1983–1985	Albion Rovers	42	(27)
1985–1993	Middlesbrough	307	(118)
1993–1994	Port Vale	33	(9)
1994–1995	Darlington	37	(7)
1997–1999	Billingham Synthonia	21	(22)
Total		467	(184)

International career
1990–1993	Republic of Ireland	7	(1)
- * Club domestic league appearances and goals

Bernard Joseph Slaven (born 13 November 1960) is a former professional football striker. He scored 223 goals in 569 league and cup appearances throughout an 18-year career and also earned seven caps for the Republic of Ireland.

He started his career in his native Scotland with Greenock Morton in 1980 before moving on to Airdrieonians, Queen of the South, and then Albion Rovers in 1983. He scored 31 goals in 43 appearances to become the highest scorer in the Scottish Football League in the 1984–85 campaign before he was sold to Middlesbrough for a fee of £25,000 early in the following season. He was promoted three times with the club: out of the Third Division in 1986–87, out of the Second Division via the play-offs in 1988, and again out of the Second Division in 1991–92. He also played for Middlesbrough in the 1990 final of the Full Members Cup and became the first Irish player to score a goal in the Premier League in the inaugural 1992–93 season. He was twice named the club's Player of the Year and scored 146 goals in 381 appearances during his eight years at Ayresome Park.

He took a free transfer to Port Vale in March 1993 and helped the club to lift the Football League Trophy two months later. He returned to the North-East in February 1994 after joining Darlington on a free transfer. He helped the club to avoid finishing bottom of the English Football League at the end of the season before he announced his retirement in May 1995. He later played non-League football for Billingham Synthonia. He went into radio after retiring as a player, presenting shows and providing commentary on Middlesbrough matches with Ali Brownlee for Century Network and Real Radio. He also presented television programmes on Boro TV and published two autobiographies.

Despite being born in Scotland, having an Irish grandfather enabled him to play for Ireland. He won seven caps for the Republic of Ireland, between 1990 and 1993. This short international career resulted in the honour of being named in Ireland's 1990 FIFA World Cup squad – though he did not feature in the tournament.

== Club career ==
=== Early career ===
Bernie Slaven was born on 13 November 1960 in Paisley, Renfrewshire but grew up in the Castlemilk area of Glasgow. An only child, his father, Hugh, was a delivery driver for the Co-op and his mother, Alice, was a tailor. He joined Partick Thistle Amateurs at 14 and played at left-half. He went on to play for Eastercraigs and again played left-half as their centre-forward was future Everton player Graeme Sharp. At the age of 18, Slaven rejected an approach from Scottish Second Division club East Stirlingshire and instead joined junior league side Johnstone Burgh. However, he soon became disillusioned with the long train journeys to Johnstone and stopped attending the club. After his contract with Johnstone Burgh ended he joined local club Rutherglen Glencairn. During his time as an amateur footballer he worked for the Co-op, before spending some time unemployed.

He was transferred to Greenock Morton in November 1980 for a fee of £750 but remained with Rutherglen Glencairn for the rest of the season. He made his debut for Morton as a second-half substitute in a 3–0 win over Airdrieonians in October 1981. He made his first start against Celtic at Cappielow and had a goal disallowed during the game, which ended in a 1–1 draw. He scored his first goal for the club in a 1–1 draw with Airdrieonians, which was the only goal of his 13 Scottish Premier Division appearances in the 1981–82 season. He soon fell out with manager Benny Rooney after demanding more game time. Slaven made nine non-scoring appearances during the 1982–83 campaign, and was released in the summer.

Slaven joined Scottish First Division club Airdrieonians on a one-month contract after manager Bill Munro needed short-term replacements during an injury crisis. He then spent three months without a club before signing with Dumfries side Queen of the South. He played two Second Division matches for the club before again becoming a free agent. He made little impression at Palmerston Park, and in a later interview teammate George Cloy said of Slaven, "He was just a man who liked playing football. He was a nice enough guy but he wasn't one of the more rowdy ones."

=== Albion Rovers ===
Slaven joined Albion Rovers in April 1983 after being signed by Benny Rooney – his former manager at Morton; however, it would be Rooney's successor, Andy Ritchie, who converted Slaven from a left-half into a centre-forward. In this new position he scored 31 goals in the 1984–85 season with many set up by Vic Kasule. Slaven won the 1984–85 Daily Record Golden Shot award in the process. Ritchie would not enjoy the benefits of his decision though, as he was replaced by Joe Baker early in the season. Baker went to also appoint Slaven as club captain. Slaven went on to be named as both the club's and the division's Player of the Year. During this time as a semi-professional, he was working as a gardener. Still, Rovers chairman Tom Fagan demanded £40,000 to sell Slaven, a high price for a non-professional third-tier player. Slaven refused to play for Rovers, and was subsequently contacted by a reporter from The Sunday Post, who wrote to 54 English and Scottish clubs on his behalf. Middlesbrough responded to the letter with the offer of a two-week trial.

"Dear Sir,
Last season I was top-scorer in Scottish senior football with 31 goals for Albion Rovers in the Second Division. At present, I am on 'Freedom of contract'. I have no intention of returning to Rovers. I am keen to sample full-time football at the highest level, and wonder if you might consider signing me. I would be willing to come to your club on a trial basis, as I am desperate to get back into the game. I honestly feel I have the ability to play for your club. Although I have not played since I took up 'Freedom of contract' at the end of last season, I have kept fit during the summer training on my own every day. I am 24 years old, and hope that you will at least think over this approach.
Yours sincerely,
BERNIE SLAVEN

— The letter Slaven posted to 54 different clubs on 21 September 1985.

=== Middlesbrough ===
In a trial game against Bradford City, Slaven scored and impressed enough to win a move to the club, who secured his services after paying Albion Rovers a £25,000 fee. He made his debut in a 1–0 defeat to Leeds United at Elland Road on 12 October, and seven days later scored on his competitive home debut for the club to secure a 1–1 draw with Bradford City. Middlesbrough went on a run of five wins in eight games during November and December, but manager Willie Maddren was sacked after picking up just one point in January. Slaven scored two headed goals to secure a 3–1 victory over Grimsby Town on 4 March in new manager Bruce Rioch's first match in charge. However, the final game of the 1985–86 season against Shrewsbury Town guaranteed safety for the winners and relegation for the losers, and a 2–1 defeat for "Boro" saw the club relegated out of the Second Division.

Middlesbrough entered liquidation during the 1986–87 season, and the Official receiver sacked Rioch and his staff and banned the club from Ayresome Park. After a new consortium rescued the club Rioch was reinstated as manager, and though he used the opportunity to overhaul the club's playing staff, Rioch made Slaven a key part of his new squad. Despite this, Rioch was not afraid to publicly criticise Slaven, and following the club's first defeat of the season by Blackpool on 11 October stated that "...he's overdue a good performance, I wasn't pleased with his form and it's time to show us what he gets paid for". He responded well to the criticism, and scored all three goals when Blackpool returned to Ayresome Park in the FA Cup the following month. He played in all the club's 58 league and cup games that season, scoring 22 goals, to help Middlesbrough to secure promotion as runners-up to AFC Bournemouth.

He helped secure a second-successive promotion in 1987–88, which saw Middlesbrough rise from the Third Division to the First Division within two years of avoiding liquidation. He scored 24 goals in 58 appearances, including hat-tricks in a 4–1 win at Huddersfield Town and a 4–0 home win over Shrewsbury Town. However, Middlesbrough lost to Leicester City on the last day of the season and so finished third behind Aston Villa on goals scored, and needed to secure promotion through the play-offs. He scored against Bradford City in the play-off semi-final to help secure a 3–2 aggregate victory and a place against Chelsea in the play-off final. He provided an assist for Trevor Senior in the first leg at Ayresome Park and then scored Boro's second goal to secure a 2–0 win; Chelsea won the return fixture 1–0 at Stamford Bridge, but Middlesbrough won 2–1 on aggregate to replace Chelsea in the top-flight.

Slaven scored a first-half hat-trick in a 4–3 win over Coventry City on 1 October, shortly after he and several teammates agreed new four-year contracts with Middlesbrough. At the end of the month he was moved to the left wing to accommodate new club record signing Peter Davenport. Still, he soon was returned to centre-forward after Davenport struggled to score the goals to justify his £700,000 transfer fee. In November, Slaven was dropped from the starting eleven for the trip to face Nottingham Forest, which brought to an end his run of 136 consecutive league appearances. The team struggled in the second half of the 1988–89 season, and when Slaven scored both goals in a 2–1 win over West Ham United at Upton Park on 11 April he ended the club's run of 11 league games without a victory. Middlesbrough dropped into the relegation zone for the first time on the last day of the season; their 1–0 defeat at Sheffield Wednesday confirmed Middlesbrough's relegation alongside West Ham United and Newcastle United. Having scored 15 league goals despite playing many games on the left wing of a relegated team, Slaven was named as the North-East Player of the Year by local journalists.

Middlesbrough struggled with injuries throughout the 1989–90 campaign and ended up finishing just one place above the relegation zone, leading to Rioch's dismissal. They did however, manage to beat Port Vale, Sheffield Wednesday, Newcastle United, and Aston Villa to reach Wembley to face Chelsea in the 1990 Full Members Cup final; this was the club's first appearance at Wembley. The final itself was to be a disappointment however, with a free kick from Chelsea's Tony Dorigo proving to be the only goal of the afternoon. Despite Middlesbrough finishing in 21st-place, Slaven scored 32 goals in all competitions, which led to speculation of a move away from Ayresome Park. He handed in a written transfer request, which was turned down by manager Colin Todd, and Slaven agreed to a new contract and withdrew his transfer request.

He went six games without a goal early in the 1990–91 season but broke this run with a hat-trick in a 4–2 win over Brighton & Hove Albion at the Goldstone Ground on 27 October. However, he was substituted at half-time during a home defeat to Charlton Athletic on 10 November, and reacted badly, leaving the ground and not witnessing the second half. He returned to the starting eleven the following week and went on to claim a goal in his next five appearances. However, he again fell out with Todd after being played at left-wing in January. He was dropped from the first team altogether after telling the media that "if the manager is not going to play me in the middle, then he should drop me". He returned to the centre-forward role and claimed two goals in a 3–0 home win over rivals Newcastle United on 12 March, though went on to finish the season on a run of 15 games without a goal. Middlesbrough finished in the play-off places but lost out to Notts County in the semi-finals. Todd intended an overhaul of the playing squad and placed Slaven on the transfer list along with ten of his teammates.

Todd was sacked in June 1991, and his successor Lennie Lawrence decided to keep Slaven and to play him in a partnership with new signing Paul Wilkinson. However, Slaven picked up a calf strain in pre-season and lost his first-team place to Stuart Ripley. He regained his first-team place early in September after scoring three goals as a substitute against Portsmouth and Oxford United. On 28 September, he scored the opening goal in a 2–1 victory over rivals Sunderland. However, Lawrence felt that Slaven was too individualistic, and in November he spent £700,000 on Hull City striker Andy Payton, who he hoped would prove to be an effective striker partner for Paul Wilkinson. Payton scored on his debut against Bristol City on 23 November, but Slaven claimed the other two goals in a 3–1 victory, and Payton left the field on a stretcher after picking up an injury. Slaven injured his knee in January. After undergoing surgery, he was ruled out of action for five weeks. He scored a hat-trick in a 4–0 win over Brighton on 21 March but fell out with Lawrence and was dropped for the end of season promotion run-in. He returned for the crucial final game of the season against Wolverhampton Wanderers however, and set up a late Jon Gittens equaliser before a late winner from Wilkinson secured a 2–1 victory and the second automatic promotion place for Middlesbrough. That season Middlesbrough had also reached the semi-final of the League Cup; in the second leg against Manchester United at Old Trafford Slaven equalised to send the game to extra time, before Ryan Giggs scored the winning goal.

On 19 August 1992, he became Ireland's first goalscorer in the Premier League when he scored both Middlesbrough goals in a 2–0 win over Manchester City. With Payton and Ripley both moved on, Slaven started seven of the club's first ten Premier League games of the 1992–93 season, and scored in consecutive games against Aston Villa and Manchester United. His goal against Manchester United on 3 October proved to be his last for Middlesbrough as Lawrence began playing Wilkinson on his own up front from October, leaving Slaven on the bench for most of the rest of the campaign. Slaven again requested a transfer, and Lawrence said he would listen to any offers the club received. Lawrence sent Slaven to train with the youth team after the pair fell out during a training ground session, and Slaven was made available on a free transfer after he told the press how strained the pair's relationship had become.

=== Port Vale ===
In March 1993, Slaven signed for John Rudge's Second Division Port Vale on a free transfer. He was sent off on his debut in a 1–0 win over Leyton Orient at Brisbane Road on 20 March – the first red card of his career – after kicking Adrian Whitbread in retaliation for a bad challenge. He scored his first goal for the "Valiants" with a 25 yards (23 m) volley in a 4–0 win over Wigan Athletic at Springfield Park on 17 April. Four days later he scored the only goal of the game in the Football League Trophy southern area final second leg match with Exeter City at St James Park to secure Vale a place in the final. He also scored on the final day of the season to help turn round a half-time 2–1 deficit to Blackpool at Bloomfield Road into a 4–2 win; however, they ended the season in third-place, one point behind promoted Bolton Wanderers, and so entered the play-offs. He went on to provide the cross for Martin Foyle to score the winning goal past Stockport County in the play-off semi-finals. Stockport County were also Vale's opponents in the Football League Trophy final at Wembley on 22 May, and Slaven managed to set up Paul Kerr for Vale's first goal before scoring the second decisive goal of a 2–1 victory. Ironically it was Sky TV's match summariser, Lennie Lawrence, who was tasked with naming Slaven as the man of the match just two months after letting him go on a free transfer. Eight days later he featured again at Wembley in the play-off final, which ended in a 3–0 defeat to West Bromwich Albion.

He started the 1993–94 season with a hat-trick in a 6–0 win over Barnet in the first home game of the campaign on 21 August. However, he picked up a calf strain and lost his first-team place to Nicky Cross, who performed well in Slaven's absence. He was also punched in the face by Peter Swan in a training ground incident, though the pair would eventually make up and become friends. Slaven wanted to return to the North-East to be with his wife Karen and new-born son Dominic; however, manager John Rudge was reluctant to lose Slaven despite being unable to promise him a contract for the following season. He scored his last goal for the club in a 1–0 win over Premier League Southampton in an FA Cup third round replay at Vale Park on 18 January.

=== Later career ===
Slaven joined Darlington in February 1994, who were struggling at the bottom of the Third Division. He made the move to be closer to his young family. Despite playing at a lower standard, he found shooting chances hard to come by, and ended the 1994–95 campaign with two goals in 11 appearances. Darlington avoided dropping into non-League after Slaven scored the winning goal against Chesterfield that moved Darlington above Northampton Town and off the bottom of the table. The "Quakers" again fared poorly in 1994–95 under Alan Murray. Though Slaven managed to hit seven goals in 31 games he was given a free transfer in May 1995. He decided to retire from professional football after a consultant advised him that a troubling back injury would only get worse with further stress. He played for Northern League side Billingham Synthonia during the 1997–98 and 1998–99 seasons, scoring 22 goals in 21 appearances.

== International career ==
Slaven was born in Scotland, but qualified for Republic of Ireland through his Irish grandfather. He made the decision to represent Ireland after being consistently overlooked for the Scotland team by manager Andy Roxburgh, and stated that: "if I'd been scoring for Celtic or Rangers I'd have walked into the side, there are people getting in the team that can hardly play the game". After calling Slaven up in 1990, Ireland manager Jack Charlton said that "Bernie is the type of player who could benefit from Cascarino's knock downs... we have been looking for a player like Bernie for quite a while now". He made his international debut in a friendly on 28 March 1990, and scored the only goal of the game against Wales from a rebound after Kevin Sheedy had a penalty saved by Neville Southall. He won a second cap as a substitute against Finland on 16 May, before he was named in the Ireland squad for the 1990 FIFA World Cup. Slaven did not feature in the tournament however, and suffered from homesickness. Tony Cascarino claimed in his autobiography that Slaven would telephone his dog every night when away from home with the squad: "... Bernie would be howling like Lassie into the phone 'Woof, woof, aru, aru, woof!' He'd be kissing the receiver and lavishing affection – 'Hello, lovey dovey' – on a dog!" A church-going Catholic, Slaven stated that the highlight of the tournament was the day when the squad met Pope John Paul II at the Vatican. He won the last of his seven caps on 17 February 1993, in a 2–1 win over Wales in a friendly at Tolka Park.

== Style of play ==
Slaven was a forward who scored many goals due to his excellent first touch, anticipation and finishing skills. He was criticised for his defending and heading skills, as well as his habit of frequently standing in an offside position. His customary goal celebration was to jump up on the fence at the Holgate End at Boro's old ground, Ayresome Park. When the ground was knocked down in 1996, Slaven acquired a section of the fence from the Holgate End and displayed it in his back garden for some years.

== Media career ==
Slaven was granted a testimonial match by Middlesbrough against Hereford United at the Riverside Stadium in 1996, but was embarrassed by a low turnout of 3,537. He went into radio after retiring as a player, and co-hosted Century FM's coverage of Middlesbrough matches with Ali Brownlee from 1996 to 2007. Brownlee tended to be positive and optimistic about Middlesbrough, whereas Slaven would be more critical and realistic. The pair also presented shows for NTL's "Boro TV" channel from 1997 until Slaven was sacked in December 2002 after he missed a filming session in protest at the company's habit of failing to pay wages on time. In 1999, Slaven bared his buttocks in Binns department store window in Middlesbrough after telling Brownlee on Century FM that if Middlesbrough beat Manchester United at Old Trafford, he would perform the dare. Middlesbrough ran out 3–2 winners, so Slaven had to go ahead with the dare, with the score painted on his cheeks. He went on to recreate the moment on television for They Think It's All Over's "Feel The Sportsman" round. He announced his intention to stand for the newly created post of Mayor of Middlesbrough in October 2002, but withdrew from the race before the election as his candidacy was a publicity stunt for Century FM rather than a serious attempt to enter politics. He went on to present Legends Football Phone-In for Real Radio North East and later Koast Radio from 200 to 2014, alongside him were Malcolm Macdonald and Eric Gates who was replaced later by Micky Horswill. He released two autobiographies: Strikingly Different in 1996, and Legend? in 2007.

In 2015, Slaven became a Patron of Sporting Memories, a charity that supports former players and older fans living with dementia, depression or loneliness.

== Career statistics ==
=== Club statistics ===
Appearances and goals by club, season and competition
Club	Season	League			FA Cup		Other (Note: Includes Scottish Cup, Scottish League Cup, League Cup, Football League Trophy, Full Members Cup, and play-offs.)		Total	
Club	Season	Division	Apps	Goals	Apps	Goals	Apps	Goals	Apps	Goals
Greenock Morton	1981–82	Scottish Premier Division	13	1	0	0	1	0	14	1
Greenock Morton	1982–83	Scottish Premier Division	8	0	0	0	1	0	9	0
Greenock Morton	Total		21	1	0	0	2	0	23	1
Airdrieonians	1983–84	Scottish First Division	2	0	0	0	4	0	6	0
Queen of the South	1983–84	Scottish Second Division	2	0	0	0	0	0	2	0
Albion Rovers	1983–84	Scottish Second Division	3	0	0	0	0	0	3	0
Albion Rovers	1984–85	Scottish Second Division	39	27	0	0	4	4	43	31
Albion Rovers	Total		42	27	0	0	4	4	46	31
Middlesbrough	1985–86	Second Division	32	8	1	0	1	1	34	9
Middlesbrough	1986–87	Third Division	46	17	3	3	9	2	58	22
Middlesbrough	1987–88	Second Division	44	21	5	0	9	3	58	24
Middlesbrough	1988–89	First Division	37	15	1	1	6	2	44	18
Middlesbrough	1989–90	Second Division	46	21	3	0	10	11	59	32
Middlesbrough	1990–91	Second Division	46	16	3	0	9	4	58	20
Middlesbrough	1991–92	Second Division	38	16	2	0	9	2	49	18
Middlesbrough	1992–93	Premier League	18	4	1	0	2	0	21	4
Middlesbrough	Total		307	118	19	4	55	25	381	147
Port Vale	1992–93	Second Division	10	2	0	0	5	2	15	4
Port Vale	1993–94	Second Division	23	7	4	1	4	1	31	9
Port Vale	Total		33	9	4	1	9	3	46	13
Darlington	1993–94	Third Division	11	2	0	0	0	0	11	2
Darlington	1994–95	Third Division	26	5	2	1	3	1	31	7
Darlington	Total		37	7	2	1	3	1	42	9
Billingham Synthonia total			21	22	0	0	0	0	21	22
Career total			467	184	25	6	77	33	569	223

=== International statistics ===
Republic of Ireland national team
Year	Apps	Goals
1990	4	1
1991	2	0
1993	1	0
Total	7	1

== Honours ==
Middlesbrough

- Football League Second Division play-offs: 1988
- Football League Second Division second-place promotion: 1991–92
- Football League Third Division second-place promotion: 1986–87
- Full Members' Cup runner-up: 1989–90

Port Vale

- Football League Trophy: 1992–93

Individual

- SPFA Second Division Player of the Year: 1984–85
- Albion Rovers Player of the Year: 1984–85
- Middlesbrough Player of the Year: 1988–89, 1989–90

== See also ==
- List of Republic of Ireland international footballers born outside the Republic of Ireland
