= 1988 Football League Second Division play-off final =

Association football match in England

| Middlesbrough | Chelsea |
| 2 | 1 |
- on aggregate

First leg
| Middlesbrough | Chelsea |
| 2 | 0 |
- Date: 25 May 1988
- Venue: Ayresome Park, Middlesbrough
- Referee: Keith Hackett (Sheffield)
- Attendance: 25,531

Second leg
| Chelsea | Middlesbrough |
| 1 | 0 |
- Date: 28 May 1988
- Venue: Stamford Bridge, London
- Referee: Brian Hill (Kettering)
- Attendance: 40,550

The 1988 Football League Second Division play-off final was an association football match contested between Chelsea and Middlesbrough over two legs on 25 May 1988 and 28 May 1988. It was to determine which club would play the next season in the First Division, the top tier of English football. Chelsea had finished the season fourth from bottom in the First Division, while Middlesbrough were third in the Second Division. They were joined in the play-offs by the teams that had finished fourth and fifth in the Second Division: Chelsea defeated Blackburn Rovers in their play-off semi-final, while Middlesbrough beat Bradford City.

The first leg of the final was played at Ayresome Park in Middlesbrough, in front of a crowd of 25,531. Trevor Senior and Bernie Slaven scored for Middlesbrough, who won the match 2–0. Three days later, at Stamford Bridge in London, 40,550 fans watched Chelsea beat Middlesbrough 1–0. Gordon Durie scored the only goal of the match, but it was not enough for Chelsea, who lost the tie 2–1 on aggregate. Middlesbrough were promoted to the First Division where they remained for one season before they were relegated. Chelsea won the Second Division the following season and, as of 2025, remain in the top tier of English football.

After the final whistle, a few hundred Chelsea fans broke onto the pitch and threw projectiles at the visiting supporters. It took the police around 40 minutes to clear the pitch and the terraces, and 45 people were injured, including 25 police officers. In total, 102 arrests were made, and Chelsea were later found guilty of failing to control their supporters. They were given a £75,000 fine and had to close their terraces for the first six matches of the subsequent season.

== Background ==
English Football League play-offs were first introduced to determine promotion and relegation between the First and Second Divisions, the top two tiers of the English football league system, in the 1986–87 season. They were a means of reducing the number of teams in the First Division from 22 down to 20, but were also designed to add excitement to the end of the season, giving more teams something to compete for, while also generating more money for those clubs involved. For the first two seasons, they featured three teams from the Second Division, along with one from the First Division. The bottom three clubs from the First Division were automatically relegated, while the fourth from bottom entered the play-offs. In the Second Division, the top two clubs gained automatic promotion, and the teams finishing in third to fifth competed in the play-offs.

Chelsea had been Second Division champions in the 1983–84 season, and had played in the First Division for the four seasons since. After two sixth-placed finishes in their first two seasons in the top tier, they dropped to 14th in the 1986–87 season. Middlesbrough had a more turbulent recent history: they were relegated from the First Division in 1982, and four years later dropped down into the Third Division. They were also struggling financially, and in July 1986 their debts forced them into liquidation. The club were locked out of their Ayresome Park ground, and only a last minute rescue by a consortium saved the club. Middlesbrough gained promotion back to the Second Division at their first attempt in the 1986–87 season. According to accountancy firm Deloitte, the match was worth £1 million to the promoted club through increases in matchday, commercial and broadcasting income.

=== Football hooliganism ===
Football hooliganism has been present within English football since its inception. In the 1960s it escalated and developed from attacks towards oppositions players into fights between opposing fans. The driving force behind the escalation was predominantly groups of young, male fans who wanted to prove their toughness. By the middle of the 1960s, football hooliganism was considered a national problem which affected the image of England overseas. Local and national government intervened to tackle the problem rather than leave it to the football authorities.

Measures introduced to deal with hooliganism were the segregation of opposing fans at matches, which was initially voluntary, before later being enforced, and an increased police presence at football matches. Security fences were erected at grounds, often topped with barbed wire, to keep fans apart and off the pitch. Although this segregation resulted in reduced violence at football matches, it helped to foster a collective identity for the groups of supporters, and often just shifted the violence out of the stadium into the nearby streets. This in turn led to the creation of what Ramón Spaaij describes as "super hooligan" groups, such as Chelsea's Headhunters group, who actively sought out fights against opposing fans.

In 1985, a series of incidents brought English football hooliganism to a head. First, during a match between Luton Town and Millwall in March, a mass riot broke out between the two sets of fans, which spread onto the pitch and into the surrounding town. Sean Ingle writing in The Guardian described it as "a night football died a slow death", and the chairman of the Football Association, Bert Millichip, said that the riot was the reason that England was not named as host for the 1988 UEFA European Football Championship. Two months later, Liverpool fans were blamed for the Heysel Stadium disaster, in which 39 fans, predominantly supporters of Juventus, were killed and over 600 injured. That incident led to English clubs being banned from European competitions for five years.

In the late 1980s, Chelsea's hooligan groups, particularly the Headhunters, were well known for their racism, far-right extremism and violence. According to Nick Lowles and Andy Nicholls, in their history of British hooliganism, Chelsea were widely considered to be the "top dogs" of hooligan groups at the time, though the club's chairman, Ken Bates blamed the media for this reputation, saying that although he accepted the club had a problem with hooligans, he blamed the press coverage the club was given: "[Chelsea] are the only club consistently criticised, consistently persecuted and consistently emphasised. If Chelsea has the worst reputation in the country it is because of irresponsible reporting."

== Route to the final ==
Chelsea finished the 1987–88 season in 18th place—fourth from bottom—in the First Division. They finished seven points ahead of Portsmouth (who were relegated in 19th place), and were level on points with West Ham United and Charlton Athletic; but both teams had a superior goal difference to Chelsea. Middlesbrough finished the season in third place in the Second Division: goals scored over the season had to be used as a tie-breaker, as they were level on both points and goal difference with Aston Villa, who were automatically promoted in second place. Aston Villa had scored 68 goals over the course of the season, while Middlesbrough had scored 63. Both teams, along with Bradford City and Blackburn Rovers entered the play-offs to determine who would play in the First Division in the following 1988–89 season. Middlesbrough were managed by Bruce Rioch who had held the position since February 1986. Bobby Campbell had been appointed as Chelsea's caretaker manager two weeks prior to the final, after the resignation of John Hollins.

Chelsea travelled to Blackburn's Ewood Park for the first leg of their play-off semi-final. They lost John Bumstead to an injury midway through the first half, but opened the scoring after a minute of the second half when Gordon Durie curled a shot around Blackburn's Terry Gennoe. Pat Nevin later doubled the lead, and the match ended 2–0 to Chelsea. In the second leg, both sides missed chances early on before Kevin Wilson scored a volley for Chelsea after 26 minutes. Kerry Dixon redirected the ball into the goal with his thigh 10 minutes into the second half to give Chelsea a four-goal advantage in the tie, and although Scott Sellars pulled a goal back for Blackburn, Chelsea added two more late goals through Wilson and Durie to secure a 4–1 victory in the match, and Chelsea progressed to the final 6–1 on aggregate.

For their semi-final, Middlesbrough also journeyed away from home for the first leg, visiting Bradford City's Valley Parade ground. Both sides had chances in the first half, but the match remained goalless until the 67th minute, when Karl Goddard scored for the hosts. Middlesbrough equalised a minute later, through a header from Trevor Senior, but Bradford retook the lead almost immediately when Stuart McCall scored from close-range. After three goals in three minutes, no more were scored, and the match finished 2–1 to Bradford. In the second leg, a goal from Bernie Slaven gave Middlesbrough the lead in the 35th minute, and the match remained 1–0 at the end of 90 minutes: 2–2 on aggregate. Going into extra time, Middlesbrough added a second goal almost immediately; the Bradford City defender Lee Sinnott missed a cross by Colin Cooper, which fell to Gary Hamilton who put it in the net. Stephen Pears, the Middlesbrough goalkeeper made two saves from Ian Ormondroyd in the 111th minute, and his side held on to claim a 3–2 aggregate victory. In his history of the club, Richard Piers Rayner describes watching that match from the terraces as among his favourite moments as a Middlesbrough fan.

== Match details ==
=== First leg ===
==== Summary ====
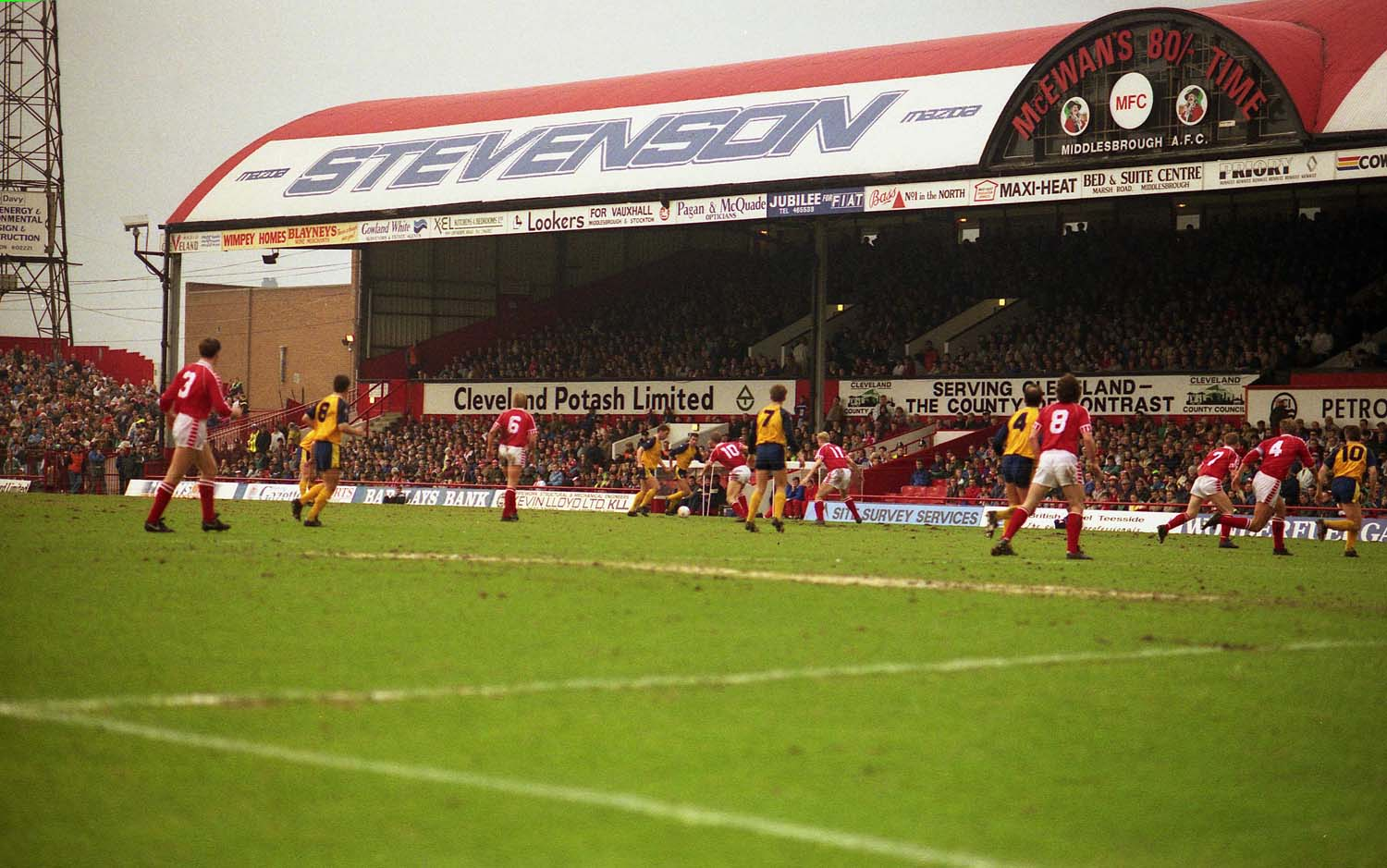
The first leg was played at Middlesbrough's Ayresome Park (pictured in 1991).

The play-off final first leg was played at Middlesbrough's Ayresome Park, in front of a crowd of 25,531. Keith Hackett was chosen to referee the fixture; The Guardian's David Lacey rated him as the Football League's best. Middlesbrough had a chance at goal early in the match; Slaven beat Chelsea's offside trap and set-up Senior, but the Chelsea goalkeeper, Kevin Hitchcock managed to get his left palm to the attempted chip. Nevin then created an opportunity for Chelsea, crossing the ball to Dixon, who missed the goal with his header. Chelsea created another chance in the 27th minute; the ball bounced over the head of the Middlesbrough defender Gary Pallister, and was collected by Durie, who evaded another defender, Tony Mowbray, but his shot was saved by Pears. Three minutes later, Slaven crossed the ball to Senior, who scored with a glancing header, to put Middlesbrough 1–0 ahead: Clive White of The Times described it as "a slightly flattering lead". The score remained unchanged at half-time.

In the second half, Stuart Ripley crossed the ball into the Chelsea penalty area, but there were no Middlesbrough forwards to convert the chance. Shortly after, Tony Dorigo broke through the Middlesbrough defence with a run, but nothing came of the opportunity. Both teams continued to attack; Cynthia Bateman of The Guardian said that "Chelsea always had the edge in skill", but were always at risk of "being overwhelmed by the ferocity" of Middlesbrough's attacks. Pallister had a shot after a Middlesbrough corner was palmed away from goal by Hitchcock, but he put the rebound straight back at the goalkeeper. Chelsea also missed a rebound: Durie struck a strong shot, which Pears parried to Colin Pates, but he mishit his shot. Senior and Slaven combined again in the 81st minute to double Middlesbrough's lead; Senior crossed the ball in from the right, and Slaven cut in from the opposition wing. His first shot was saved by Hitchcock, but Slaven put away his own rebound to make it 2–0.

==== Details ====
25 May 1988
19:30 BST

| Middlesbrough | 2–0 | Chelsea |
|---|---|---|
| Senior 30'; Slaven 81' | Report |

Ayresome Park, Middlesbrough
Attendance: 25,531
Referee: Keith Hackett

| Middlesbrough | Chelsea |

| GK | 1 | Stephen Pears |
| RB | 2 | Gary Parkinson |
| LB | 3 | Colin Cooper |
| CB | 4 | Tony Mowbray (c) |
| CM | 5 | Gary Hamilton |
| CB | 6 | Gary Pallister |
| CF | 7 | Bernie Slaven |
| RM | 8 | Stuart Ripley |
| CF | 9 | Trevor Senior |
| CM | 10 | Paul Kerr |
| LM | 11 | Dean Glover |
Manager:
Bruce Rioch

| GK | 1 | Kevin Hitchcock |
| RB | 2 | Steve Clarke |
| LB | 3 | Tony Dorigo |
| CM | 4 | Steve Wicks |
| CB | 5 | Joe McLaughlin (c) |
| CB | 6 | Colin Pates |
| CM | 7 | Pat Nevin |
| CM | 8 | John Bumstead |
| FW | 9 | Kerry Dixon |
| FW | 10 | Gordon Durie |
| FW | 11 | Kevin Wilson |
Manager:
Bobby Campbell

=== Second leg ===
==== Summary ====
The second leg took place at Stamford Bridge in London on 28 May 1988 in front of a crowd of 40,550. Chelsea dominated play early on; within 90 seconds of kick-off, Nevin had a shot at goal which Pears "brilliantly" deflected onto the post, according to White. Middlesbrough's best chance of the match came a few minutes later, when a cross-cum-shot from Cooper rebounded off the post to Slaven. From 5 yards (5 m), his headed shot went over the bar. Nevin created Chelsea's goal in the 18th minute, finding Durie with a long pass, who curled the ball into the net from 10 yards (9 m) out. Soon after, Durie broke through the Middlesbrough defence, but Dixon was offside, and play was stopped. Chelsea continued to dominate possession for the rest of the game, and Nevin created more opportunities for his side, but they did not manage to have another shot on target after their goal. The Observer's Louise Taylor credited Chelsea's superiority "to an outstanding individual performance from Pat Nevin", but in the second half she said that "Chelsea's play became infected with desperation". The match finished 1–0 to Chelsea; Middlesbrough won the tie 2–1 on aggregate.

==== Details ====
28 May 1988
15:00 BST

| Chelsea | 1–0 | Middlesbrough |
|---|---|---|
| Durie 18' | Report |

Stamford Bridge, London
Attendance: 40,550
Referee: Brian Hill

| Chelsea | Middlesbrough |

| GK | 1 | Kevin Hitchcock |
| RB | 2 | Steve Clarke |
| LB | 3 | Tony Dorigo |
| CM | 4 | Steve Wicks |
| CB | 5 | Joe McLaughlin (c) |
| CB | 6 | Colin Pates | (substituted off) 80' |
| CM | 7 | Pat Nevin |
| CM | 8 | John Bumstead |
| FW | 9 | Kerry Dixon |
| FW | 10 | Gordon Durie |
| FW | 11 | Kevin Wilson | (substituted off) 80' |
Substitutes:
| MF | 12 | Gareth Hall | (substituted on) 80' |
| MF | 14 | Kevin McAllister | (substituted on) 80' |
Manager:
Bobby Campbell

| GK | 1 | Stephen Pears |
| RB | 2 | Gary Parkinson |
| LB | 3 | Colin Cooper |
| CB | 4 | Tony Mowbray (c) |
| CB | 5 | Gary Hamilton |
| RM | 6 | Gary Pallister |
| CF | 7 | Bernie Slaven |
| CM | 8 | Stuart Ripley |
| CF | 9 | Trevor Senior |
| CM | 10 | Paul Kerr |
| LM | 11 | Dean Glover |
Manager:
Bruce Rioch

== Post-match hooliganism ==
After the final whistle had been blown, around twelve Middlesbrough fans climbed over the fencing surrounding the pitch, and according to White, "celebrated provocatively on the pitch". Seeing this, roughly 300 Chelsea supporters broke through a gate in the security fence at the Shed End to enter the pitch and ran towards the stand holding the Middlesbrough fans, while throwing a variety of projectiles, including stones. White said that while the Chelsea fans were entering the pitch, he could not see any of the 378 police officers who were on duty at the match. Writing about the incident in 2020, Anthony Vickers of TeessideLive described it as "a sustained and unprovoked attack from vicious Chelsea hooligans", though Lowles and Nicholls suggest that had the members of Middlesbrough's hooligan group managed to get onto the pitch, "the story would have been very different". According to them, around 1,000 members of Middlesbrough's "Frontline" mob had travelled to London for the match, and had marched provocatively en masse to the ground.

Slaven, part of the victorious Middlesbrough team, had initially started to run towards his team's supporters to celebrate, but he recalls "the Boro fans looking fearful and apprehensive", and when he turned around to see the Chelsea fans running towards him, he joined his teammates in escaping down the tunnel. He said that one of them, Gary Hamilton, had a bottle thrown at him. Roughly 30 police officers created a cordon between the opposing fans, and prevented them from engaging until a mounted police unit arrived to disperse the crowd, and according to the Sunday Mirror, they charged into the supporters on the pitch, knocking some of them over. The police continued to clear the Chelsea fans from the pitch and the terraces for 40 minutes, doing so "under a constant hail of missiles" according to the Sunday Tribune. After 45 minutes, the Middlesbrough players were able to return to the pitch and celebrate with their fans, who remained in the North Stand.

The police made 102 arrests after the match, 3 of which were Middlesbrough fans, and 45 people were injured, including 25 police officers. Bates played down the incident, saying that "the people who described it as a riot have obviously never seen a riot". He blamed the incident on the police, claiming that they should have been policing the perimeter fence. Paul Condon, the Metropolitan Police's deputy assistant commissioner, rebutted the claim, while the official police view was that the fault lay with Chelsea.

Both clubs were charged by the Football Association with failing to control their supporters; Middlesbrough were cleared of the charge, but Chelsea were found guilty. They were fined £75,000 plus costs, the largest financial penalty given by the Football Association at the time, and had to close their terraces for the first six home games of the 1988–89 season.

== Aftermath ==
Chelsea's Nevin later recalled the defeat, noting that for him "the last moment was the worst moment". The second leg was his final appearance for Chelsea before moving to Everton, and he referred to his team's dominance in the match: "we absolutely battered them". Middlesbrough were promoted to the First Division for the 1988–89 season, completing back-to-back promotions, but only survived one season in the top tier. They finished their next campaign in 18th place and were relegated back to the Second Division, where they remained for a further three seasons. Chelsea were Second Division champions in the 1988–89 season, regaining promotion to the top tier and, as of 2021, have remained there ever since.

In June 1988, UEFA, the governing body for association football in Europe, had been due to meet to discuss whether to readmit English clubs to European competitions in the 1988–89 season. In the wake of the post-match incident during the second leg between Chelsea and Middlesbrough, along with hooliganism at a match between England and Scotland, the English Football Association withdrew their request to be re-admitted. English clubs eventually returned to European competition in the 1990–91 season, at the conclusion of the original five-year ban.

== Bibliography ==
- Foster, Richard (2015). The Agony & The Ecstasy. Huddersfield: Ockley Books. ISBN 978-1-910906-00-2.
- King, Anthony (December 1998). "The Postmodernity of Football Hooliganism". The British Journal of Sociology. 48 (4): 576–593. doi:10.2307/591597. JSTOR 591597. PMID 9421956.
- Lowles, Nick; Nicholls, Andy (2007a). Hooligans: The A–L of Britain's Football Hooligan Gangs. Preston: Milo Books. ISBN 978-1-908479-59-4.
- Lowles, Nick; Nicholls, Andy (2007b). Hooligans 2: The M–Z of Britain's Football Hooligan Gangs. Preston: Milo Books. ISBN 978-1-908479-59-4.
- Murray, Scott; Walker, Rowan (2008). Day of the Match: A History of Football in 365 Days. Basingstoke: Pan MacMillan. ISBN 978-0-7522-2678-1.
- Rayner, Richard Piers (2014) [2008]. Middlesbrough FC The Unseen History. Derby: Breedon Books. p. 135. ISBN 978-1-78091-452-7.
- Spaaij, Ramón (2006). Understanding Football Hooliganism: A Comparison of Six Western European Football Clubs. Amsterdam: Amsterdam University Press. ISBN 978-90-5629-445-8.
