= Paul Kerr =

English footballer (born 1964)

Personal information
- Full name: Paul Andrew Kerr
- Date of birth: 9 June 1964 (age 62)
- Place of birth: Portsmouth, England
- Height: 5 ft 8 in (1.73 m)
- Position: Midfielder

Youth career
- 1980–1982: Aston Villa

Senior career*
Years	Team	Apps	(Gls)
1982–1987	Aston Villa	24	(3)
1987–1991	Middlesbrough	125	(13)
1991–1992	Millwall	44	(14)
1992–1994	Port Vale	63	(15)
1994	→ Leicester City (loan)	7	(2)
1994–1995	Wycombe Wanderers	1	(1)
Total		264	(48)
- * Club domestic league appearances and goals

Paul Andrew Kerr (born 9 June 1964) is an English former footballer who played as a midfielder. He scored 48 goals in 264 league appearances in a 13-year career in the Football League.

He began his career at Aston Villa in 1982 before moving on to Middlesbrough in January 1987. He helped the club to win promotion into the First Division with successive promotions in 1986–87 and 1988. He also played in the Full Members Cup final in 1990, before he moved on to Millwall in March 1991. He was sold to Port Vale in July 1992 for a fee of £140,000. He helped the "Valiants" to win the Football League Trophy in 1993 and then to win promotion out of the Second Division in 1993–94. Loaned out to Leicester City in March 1994, he then ended his career at Wycombe Wanderers.

== Career ==
=== Aston Villa ===
Kerr began his professional career at Aston Villa in May 1982 after two years as an apprentice. Villa recorded a sixth-place finish in the First Division in 1982–83 under Tony Barton's stewardship. Following tenth-place finishes in 1983–84 and 1984–85, Villa dropped to 16th in 1985–86. They were then relegated in 1986–87 under Billy McNeill, though Kerr escaped this fate as he left the club in January. Kerr played 34 league and cup games in his five years with the "Villans", scoring six goals.

=== Middlesbrough ===
Kerr signed with Middlesbrough for a £50,000 fee in January 1987. He helped Bruce Rioch's side to win promotion at the end of the season after a second-place finish in the Third Division. "Boro" missed out on a second-place finish in 1987–88, as they finished behind Kerr's former club Aston Villa on goals scored. He featured in both legs of the Second Division play-off final victory over Chelsea. However, they were immediately relegated in 1988–89, finishing in 18th place, one point behind Villa. They avoided a second-successive relegation in 1989–90, finishing one place and two points above the drop. Kerr also managed to get some revenge over Aston Villa by scoring past them in the 1990 Full Members Cup semi-final, which helped Middlesbrough reach Wembley for the first time in the club's history. He was an unused substitute in the final, as "Boro" lost 1–0 to Chelsea following a first-half strike from Tony Dorigo. "Boro" pushed for promotion in 1990–91 under Colin Todd. However, Kerr departed Ayresome Park in March, having scored 18 goals for Middlesbrough in 162 appearances in all competitions.

=== Millwall ===
In March 1991, Kerr was signed by Bruce Rioch for a second time, who was then in charge at Millwall and authorised a fee of £100,000. The "Lions" went on to finish the season in the play-offs places, only to lose to Brighton & Hove Albion at the semi-final stage. He then scored twelve goals in 1991–92 to become the club's top scorer during an otherwise disappointing campaign. Kerr scored 15 goals in 51 league and cup appearances at The Den.

=== Port Vale ===
Kerr signed for Port Vale in July 1992, with manager John Rudge paying a reported fee of £140,000. Kerr later claimed "I know that isn't the correct figure, I'll say no more on the subject". He settled in well, helping the Vale to win the TNT Tournament in pre-season. After initially struggling for goals, he went on to score 14 goals in 51 appearances in 1992–93, including a goal in the Potteries derby defeat at the Victoria Ground on 24 October. His most crucial goal though came in the fourth minute of the Football League Trophy final, when he converted a Bernie Slaven cross to give the "Valiants" the first goal of a 2–1 win over Stockport County at Wembley. He went on to say: "My goal was a great ball from Bernie. I'd found myself in space behind the defence and seeing the gap between the goalkeeper and the right hand post I decided to take the shot then. I knew there was a defender behind me, but I was just delighted to see the ball hit the back of the net." Eight days later he played in the play-off final defeat to West Bromwich Albion. Promotion to the First Division was finally achieved with a second-place finish in 1993–94, during which Kerr struck six goals in 34 matches. However, he left the club under a cloud and refused the offer of a new contract for less money.

=== Later career ===
Kerr joined Leicester City on loan in March 1994. He scored twice in seven First Division games for Brian Little's "Foxes" before returning to Vale Park at the end of the season. He was released by Port Vale, having scored 20 goals in 84 appearances. He joined Martin O'Neill's Wycombe Wanderers on a week-to-week contract for the 1994–95 campaign and scored one goal in his only substitute appearance in the league; he also started one cup game for the club. He collapsed in front of O'Neill, and a subsequent medical examination showed he had spinal damage and needed to retire.

== Post-retirement ==
Having acted as a financial adviser to the Professional Footballers' Association, his own business in 2002, offering financial advice to professional footballers. He also provided commentary on Middlesbrough games for BBC Radio Tees.

== Career statistics ==
Appearances and goals by club, season and competition
Club	Season	League			FA Cup		Other		Total	
Club	Season	Division	Apps	Goals	Apps	Goals	Apps	Goals	Apps	Goals
Aston Villa	1983–84	First Division	2	0	0	0	0	0	2	0
Aston Villa	1984–85	First Division	10	0	0	0	2	2	12	2
Aston Villa	1985–86	First Division	6	1	2	1	3	0	11	2
Aston Villa	1986–87	First Division	6	2	0	0	4	0	10	2
Aston Villa	Total		24	3	2	1	9	2	35	6
Middlesbrough	1986–87	Third Division	20	0	1	0	3	0	24	0
Middlesbrough	1987–88	Second Division	44	5	5	2	9	0	58	7
Middlesbrough	1988–89	First Division	20	1	0	0	4	0	24	1
Middlesbrough	1989–90	Second Division	17	1	3	0	4	1	24	2
Middlesbrough	1990–91	Second Division	24	6	2	1	6	1	32	8
Middlesbrough	Total		125	13	11	3	26	2	162	18
Millwall	1990–91	Second Division	10	2	0	0	2	0	12	2
Millwall	1991–92	Second Division	34	12	2	1	3	0	39	13
Millwall	Total		44	14	2	1	5	0	51	15
Port Vale	1992–93	Second Division	38	11	1	0	11	3	50	14
Port Vale	1993–94	Second Division	25	4	3	1	6	1	34	6
Port Vale	Total		63	15	4	1	17	4	84	20
Leicester City (loan)	1993–94	First Division	7	2	0	0	0	0	7	2
Wycombe Wanderers	1994–95	Second Division	1	1	0	0	1	0	2	1
Career total			264	48	19	6	58	8	341	62

== Honours ==
Middlesbrough

- Football League Third Division second-place promotion: 1986–87
- Football League Second Division play-offs: 1988
- Full Members' Cup runner-up: 1989–90

Port Vale

- Football League Trophy: 1992–93
- Football League Second Division second-place promotion: 1993–94
