= Mark Burke =

English footballer

Personal information
- Full name: Mark Stephen Burke
- Date of birth: 12 February 1969 (age 57)
- Place of birth: Solihull, England
- Height: 5 ft 10 in (1.78 m)
- Position: Midfielder

Youth career
- Solihull and District Schools
- 1985–1987: Aston Villa

Senior career*
Years	Team	Apps	(Gls)
1987	Aston Villa	7	(0)
1987–1991	Middlesbrough	57	(6)
1990	→ Darlington (loan)	5	(1)
1991–1994	Wolverhampton Wanderers	68	(11)
1994	→ Luton Town (loan)	3	(0)
1994–1995	Port Vale	15	(2)
1995–1999	Fortuna Sittard	108	(10)
1999–2000	Omiya Ardija	51	(9)
2001	Rapid Bucharest	8	(1)
2001	IF Brommapojkarna		
2001–2002	TOP Oss	4	(0)
Total		326	(40)

International career
1983–1984	England Schoolboys	2	(0)
1986	England Youth	2	(0)
- * Club domestic league appearances and goals

Mark Stephen Burke (born 12 February 1969) is an English former professional footballer who played as a midfielder. A player skilled at retaining the ball, he enjoyed a 15-year professional career in England, the Netherlands, Japan, Romania, and Sweden.

He began his career at Aston Villa, turning professional in February 1987. He was sold to Middlesbrough for £50,000 in December 1987 and played for Fourth Division champions Darlington on loan in October 1990. He transferred to Wolverhampton Wanderers for a £25,000 fee in March 1991 before playing on loan at Luton Town in March 1994. He signed with Port Vale in August 1994 before moving on to Fortuna Sittard the following year. He joined Omiya Ardija in 1999 before signing with TOP Oss via Rapid Bucharest and IF Brommapojkarna in 2001, helping the latter to the Division 2 Östra Svealand title.

== Career ==
Burke joined Aston Villa as a youth team scholar in June 1985 and played for England Schoolboys and England Youth before signing professionally in February 1987. He made his senior debut in a 1–0 defeat to Everton on 18 April 1987, as the "Villans" were relegated out of the First Division in 1986–87. They were immediately promoted in 1987–88. Burke managed only eight appearances for the club but he impressed the author, Lee Child, a fan of Aston Villa; the naming of the fictional character, Rev. Patrick Burke, friend of Reacher in the 23rd book of the Jack Reacher series, Past Tense (2018) is a nod to Mark.

He joined fellow Second Division side Middlesbrough for £50,000 in December 1987. "Boro" ended the campaign behind second-placed Aston Villa on goals scored. Yet, they too won promotion after beating Chelsea in the promotion/relegation play-offs to claim a place in the top flight; Burke did not feature in either leg of the play-off final. They finished one place and one point behind Aston Villa in 1988–89, but this time, their inability to surpass his former club cost them, as they occupied the final relegation place. "Boro" plummeted to 21st in the second tier in 1989–90, finishing just two points ahead of relegated Bournemouth. Burke was largely on the sidelines after falling out with manager Bruce Rioch. After a spell on loan at Darlington in October 1990, he finally left Ayresome Park in search of regular football at Wolverhampton Wanderers, signing for a £25,000 fee in March 1991. This move reunited him with Graham Turner, who had been Villa manager at the time of Burke's arrival there. Darlington went on to top the Fourth Division in 1990–91, whilst Wolves finished 12th in the Second Division.

The midfielder made his Wolves debut in a 3–3 draw with Oxford United on 16 March 1991 but was again unable to hold down a regular first-team spot. The club improved slightly to post an 11th-place finish in 1991–92. His best season at Molineux came in 1992–93 when he managed 34 appearances, scoring 8 times – the best seasonal tally of his career, as Wolves again came 11th. He was again on the periphery for the following campaign, as his side finished 8th, three points behind Derby County in the play-offs.

After a short spell on loan at First Division rivals Luton Town in March 1994, he returned to his parent club to find Graham Taylor, another of his former managers from his Villa days, was now at the helm. Burke was unable to win a place in Taylor's plans, though, and had a trial at Tottenham Hotspur before eventually joining Port Vale in August 1994. He scored twice in 15 First Division games under manager John Rudge in 1994–95, before quitting England to explore foreign football.

His first foreign club were Fortuna Sittard in the Dutch Eredivisie, where he played under Pim Verbeek. Burke had been recommended to the club by Terry Lees. He scored the winning goal on his debut against De Graafschap. Fortuna finished 13th in the Eredivisie in 1995–96, 11th in 1996–97, 7th in 1997–98, and 10th in 1998–99. He did not get along with the new boss Bert van Marwijk, and so followed Pim Verbeek to J2 League club Omiya Ardija in June 1999. He scored five goals in 20 games in 1999 and 4 goals in 31 games in 2000. Burke eventually returned to Europe after his contract expired in Japan and spent some time training with Fortuna Sittard again before signing for Rapid Bucharest on a short-term contract in March 2001, making him the first English footballer to ever play in Romania. Rapid finished fourth in Liga I in 2000–01. Burke moved on to Swedish Division 2 club IF Brommapojkarna, and helped his new club to the Östra Svealand title in 2001. He then played four games for TOP Oss of the Eerste Divisie in 2001–02.

"In England if the manager said it, you just did it. When I went to Fortuna .. I really started to understand the shape of the field, horizontally and vertically. In England, the only time I had training sessions like that was when I went on coaching courses."

— Burke learned a lot from playing outside England.

== Style of play ==
He has been described as "sure of touch, calm of mind, he would lope around in seemingly lackadaisical fashion before offering a cute little pass here or a deft touch there. A man with an eye for ball retention."

== Personal life ==
In 2013, Burke released his first eBook A different kind of soccer book, which was aimed at children, coaches, and parents.

He is capable in several languages: English, Spanish and Dutch.

== Career statistics ==
Appearances and goals by club, season and competition
Club	Season	League			National cup (Note: Includes FA Cup, Kirin Cup Soccer, Cupa României, KNVB Cup)		Other		Total	
Club	Season	Division	Apps	Goals	Apps	Goals	Apps	Goals	Apps	Goals
Aston Villa	1986–87	First Division	1	0	0	0	0	0	1	0
Aston Villa	1987–88	Second Division	6	0	0	0	1	0	7	0
Aston Villa	Total		7	0	0	0	1	0	8	0
Middlesbrough	1987–88	Second Division	16	0	2	0	0	0	18	0
Middlesbrough	1988–89	First Division	29	5	1	0	3	0	33	5
Middlesbrough	1989–90	Second Division	12	1	0	0	3	0	15	1
Middlesbrough	Total		57	6	3	0	6	0	66	6
Darlington (loan)	1990–91	Fourth Division	5	1	0	0	0	0	5	1
Wolverhampton Wanderers	1990–91	Second Division	6	0	0	0	0	0	6	0
Wolverhampton Wanderers	1991–92	Second Division	18	2	1	0	2	1	21	3
Wolverhampton Wanderers	1992–93	First Division	32	8	1	0	1	0	34	8
Wolverhampton Wanderers	1993–94	First Division	12	1	0	0	4	1	16	2
Wolverhampton Wanderers	Total		68	11	2	0	7	2	77	13
Luton Town (loan)	1993–94	First Division	3	0	1	0	0	0	4	0
Port Vale	1994–95	First Division	15	2	2	0	3	0	20	2
Fortuna Sittard	1995–96	Eredivisie	31	3			0	0	31	3
Fortuna Sittard	1996–97	Eredivisie	34	3			0	0	34	3
Fortuna Sittard	1997–98	Eredivisie	34	4			0	0	34	4
Fortuna Sittard	1998–99	Eredivisie	9	0			4	1	13	1
Fortuna Sittard	Total		108	10			4	1	112	11
Omiya Ardija	1999	J2 League	20	5	0	0	0	0	20	5
Omiya Ardija	2000	J2 League	31	4	2	0	0	0	33	4
Omiya Ardija	Total		51	9	2	0	0	0	53	9
Rapid Bucharest	2000–01	Divizia A	8	1	0	0	0	0	8	1
TOP Oss	2001–02	Eerste Divisie	4	0			0	0	4	0
Career total			326	40	10	0	21	3	357	43

== Honours ==
Darlington

- Football League Fourth Division: 1990–91

IF Brommapojkarna

- Division 2 Östra Svealand: 2001
