= Sporting Memories Network =

Sporting Memories Network CIC is a British community interest company founded in 2011 that runs sports reminiscence activities for older people, including people living with dementia, depression and loneliness. Activities use archive sports images, reports and memorabilia to prompt conversation. Its work is carried on by the Sporting Memories Foundation, a registered charity in England and Wales, and by the Sporting Memories Foundation Scotland, a registered Scottish charity.

== History ==
The organisation was founded by Chris Wilkins and Tony Jameson-Allen. It began with a pilot in 15 care homes in Leeds. By 2014 it had set up more than 80 groups in venues including sports clubs, libraries, care homes, NHS hospital wards and sheltered housing. It had also built a website holding over 3,000 sporting memories shared by sports figures, fans and group members.

The network's work with professional sports clubs was noted in the first annual report on the Prime Minister's Challenge on Dementia.

== Approach ==
Group sessions use reminiscence therapy. A 2012 study by Tolson and Schofield suggested football may appeal more to older men with dementia than the usual reminiscence topics. Sessions frequently include gentle physical activity alongside reminiscence.

== Media coverage ==
On 3 June 2014, BBC Radio 4's All in the Mind, presented by Claudia Hammond, featured sporting memories work. The network's work has also been covered by BBC Sport.

== Awards ==
- On 20 May 2014, the network received the award for Best National Dementia Friendly Initiative at the Alzheimer's Society's first Dementia Friendly Awards. Health Secretary Jeremy Hunt presented it.
- In September 2014, it was named in the 2014 New Radicals list compiled by Nesta and The Observer.
- On 6 November 2014, it won Best Football Community Scheme at the Football Business Awards.
