= Owen McGee =

English footballer

Personal information
- Full name: Owen Edward McGee
- Date of birth: 29 April 1970 (age 56)
- Place of birth: Middlesbrough, England
- Height: 5 ft 7 in (1.70 m)
- Positions: Full-back; centre-back

Youth career
- –1989: Middlesbrough (apprenticeship)

Senior career*
Years	Team	Apps	(Gls)
1989–1991	Middlesbrough	21	(1)
1991–1992	Leicester City	0	(0)
1992–1993	Scarborough	24	(0)
1993–?	Guisborough Town		
- * Club domestic league appearances and goals

Owen Edward McGee (born 29 April 1970) is an English former footballer. He joined before eventually securing his place on the first team roster. He became a firm favourite to fans, scoring a single goal in 21 appearances. Despite his lack of goals, he was praised for scoring his first goal, as he played at full-back. He left Middlesbrough in 1992 and played for lower-level clubs Scarborough and Guisborough Town.

== Playing career ==
McGee joined Middlesbrough as an apprentice, before joining the first-team squad. He made his debut with the club in a game against Aston Villa in 1989. He continued to play for the club in the 1990–91 season, and left the club at the end of season, scoring 1 goal in 21 league appearances. During his time playing for Middlesbrough, fans chanted "He's fat, he's round, he's worth a million pounds, Owen McGee! Owen McGee!"

After leaving Middlesbrough, he played for Leicester City's reserve team, Third Division side Scarborough and non-league club Guisborough Town.

== Personal life ==
McGee was born in Middlesbrough, England, and was raised in the North East of England.

== Honours ==
Middlesbrough

- Full Members' Cup runner-up: 1989–90
