= Nicky Mohan =

English footballer

Personal information
- Full name: Nicholas Mohan
- Date of birth: 6 October 1970 (age 56)
- Place of birth: Middlesbrough, England
- Height: 6 ft 2 in (1.88 m)
- Position: Defender

Youth career
- 1987: Middlesbrough

Senior career*
Years	Team	Apps	(Gls)
1987–1994	Middlesbrough	99	(9)
1992	→ Hull City (loan)	5	(1)
1994–1995	Leicester City	23	(0)
1995–1997	Bradford City	83	(4)
1997–1999	Wycombe Wanderers	58	(2)
1999–2001	Stoke City	92	(6)
2001–2002	Hull City	27	(1)
2002	Gateshead		
2002	Harrogate Town		
2002–2003	Spennymoor United		
2003–2006	Thornaby		
2006–2007	Bishop Auckland		
2007–2008	Stokesley		
2008	Guisborough Town		
- * Club domestic league appearances and goals

Nicholas Mohan (born 6 October 1970) is an English former professional footballer who played as a defender making 390 league appearances for seven clubs during his 15-year Football League career.

He most notably spent time in the Premier League with both Middlesbrough and Leicester City, as well as spells in the Football League with Hull City, Bradford City, Wycombe Wanderers and Stoke City. He also played non-league football for Gateshead, Harrogate Town, Spennymoor United, Thornaby, Bishop Auckland, Stokesley and Guisborough Town.

== Playing career ==
Born in Middlesbrough, Mohan started out as a trainee at his hometown club Middlesbrough where he spent the first seven years of his career making a total of 99 games scoring four goals. He spent a period on loan at Hull City in 1992 where he played five games.

Mohan left Teesside in 1994 to join Leicester City for £330,000. He played just one season at Filbert Street appearing in 23 games before he was one of three Leicester players, along with Ian Ormondroyd and Gavin Ward to be signed by Chris Kamara at Bradford City for £225,000. He helped City to promotion from Division Two when he was among the first City team to play at Wembley. He played 44 times for City in 1996–97 as the club avoided relegation on the final day of the season. But the arrival of new players and the return from injury of Eddie Youds forced Mohan out of the side.

He failed to appear again for City and joined Wycombe Wanderers on loan. His loan spell was deemed successful enough to join Wycombe for £85,000 in October 1997. Two years later he moved to Stoke City where he played 92 games and scoring six goals including one in the Potteries derby, before he returned to Hull City in 2001. He scored once in his second spell at the club, in a 4–0 win over York City. Whilst at Stoke he played as they won the 2000 Football League Trophy Final.

Mohan spent little more than a season back at Hull before he moved into non-league football with Gateshead. He then went on to play for Harrogate Town, Spennymoor United, Thornaby, Bishop Auckland, Stokesley, and Guisborough Town.

== Career statistics ==
Club	Season	League			FA Cup		League Cup		Other		Total	
Club	Season	Division	Apps	Goals	Apps	Goals	Apps	Goals	Apps	Goals	Apps	Goals
Middlesbrough	1988–89	First Division	6	0	1	0	0	0	1 (Note: Appearance in Full Members' Cup)	0	7	0
Middlesbrough	1989–90	Second Division	22	0	0	0	2	0	3	0	27	0
Middlesbrough	1990–91	Second Division	0	0	0	0	0	0	0	0	0	0
Middlesbrough	1991–92	Second Division	27	2	4	0	5	0	1	0	37	2
Middlesbrough	1992–93	Premier League	18	2	3	0	0	0	0	0	21	2
Middlesbrough	1993–94	First Division	26	0	2	0	4	0	6 (Note: Appearances in Anglo-Italian Cup)	0	38	0
Middlesbrough	Total		99	4	10	0	11	0	11	0	131	4
Hull City (loan)	1992–93	Second Division	5	1	0	0	0	0	0	0	5	1
Leicester City	1994–95	Premier League	23	0	1	0	2	0	0	0	26	0
Bradford City	1995–96	Second Division	39	4	2	0	6	0	5 (Note: Two Appearances in Football League Trophy and three appearances in Football League play-offs)	0	52	4
Bradford City	1996–97	First Division	44	0	3	0	2	0	0	0	49	0
Bradford City	Total		83	4	5	0	8	0	5	0	101	4
Wycombe Wanderers	1997–98	Second Division	33	0	2	0	0	0	1 (Note: Appearances in Football League Trophy)	0	36	0
Wycombe Wanderers	1998–99	Second Division	25	2	2	0	3	0	2	0	30	2
Wycombe Wanderers	Total		58	2	4	0	3	0	3	0	68	2
Stoke City	1998–99	Second Division	15	0	0	0	0	0	0	0	15	0
Stoke City	1999–2000	Second Division	40	5	0	0	3	0	8 (Note: Six appearances in Football League Trophy and two appearances in Football League play-offs)	0	51	5
Stoke City	2000–01	Second Division	37	1	2	0	6	0	4 (Note: Three appearances and one goal in Football League Trophy and one appearance in Football League play-offs)	1	49	2
Stoke City	Total		92	6	2	0	9	0	12	1	115	7
Hull City	2001–02	Third Division	27	1	0	0	2	0	1	0	30	1
Career total			387	18	22	0	35	0	32	1	476	19

== Honours ==
Bradford City

- Football League Second Division play-offs: 1996

Stoke City

- Football League Trophy: 1999–2000
