= Ian Ironside =

English footballer

Personal information
- Date of birth: 8 March 1964 (age 62)
- Place of birth: Sheffield, England
- Position: Goalkeeper

Senior career*
Years	Team	Apps	(Gls)
1982–1987	Barnsley	0	(0)
1987–1988	North Ferriby United	0	(0)
1988–1991	Scarborough	85	(0)
1991–1993	Middlesbrough	13	(0)
1992	→ Scarborough(loan)	7	(0)
1993–1995	Stockport County	19	(0)
1995–1997	Scarborough	85	(0)
1997–1998	Oldham Athletic	0	(0)
1998	Worksop Town	0	(0)
Total		209	(0)
- * Club domestic league appearances and goals

Ian Ironside (born 8 March 1964) is an English retired football goalkeeper, who spent most of his playing career at Scarborough but since retiring has returned to Sheffield and is now working as a joiner. He played in the Premier League for Middlesbrough. His son Joe Ironside is a striker for Tranmere Rovers.
