= Mark Brennan (English footballer) =

English footballer

Personal information
- Full name: Mark Robert Brennan
- Date of birth: 4 October 1965 (age 61)
- Place of birth: Rawtenstall, England
- Height: 5 ft 10 in (1.78 m)
- Position: Midfielder

Youth career
- Ipswich Town

Senior career*
Years	Team	Apps	(Gls)
1983–1988	Ipswich Town	168	(19)
1988–1990	Middlesbrough	65	(6)
1990–1992	Manchester City	29	(6)
1992–1996	Oldham Athletic	90	(7)
1997	Guangdong Hongyuan	20	(3)
1997–1998	Sydney Olympic	22	(0)
1998–1999	St George Saints	11	(2)
2000–2002	Dagenham & Redbridge	38	(3)
2002	Billericay Town	12	(1)
2002–2003	Canvey Island	7	(0)
Total		462	(47)

International career
1983–1984	England Youth	4	(1)
1986–1987	England U21	5	(0)
- * Club domestic league appearances and goals

Mark Robert Brennan (born 4 October 1965) is an English former professional footballer who played in the Football League for Ipswich Town, Middlesbrough and Manchester City, in the Premier League for Oldham Athletic, in the Chinese Jia-A League for Guangdong Hongyuan, and in the Australian National Soccer League for Sydney Olympic.

He went on to play state league football in Australia and non-League football in England. At international level, Brennan was capped five times for the England under-21 team.

== Honours ==
Middlesbrough

- Full Members' Cup runner-up: 1989–90
