= Ian Arnold =

English footballer

Personal information
- Full name: Ian Arnold
- Date of birth: 4 July 1972 (age 54)
- Place of birth: Durham, England
- Position: Forward

Senior career*
Years	Team	Apps	(Gls)
1990–1992	Middlesbrough	3	(0)
1992–1994	Carlisle United	47	(11)
1993	→ Stalybridge Celtic (loan)	16	(7)
1994–1995	Kettering Town FC	60	(42)
1997–1999	Kidderminster Harriers	72	(16)
1999–2001	Southport. goals 27		
2001–2002	Morecambe		
2002–2004	Barrow		
2004–2007	Workington		

International career
1995	England C	2	(0)
- * Club domestic league appearances and goals

Ian Arnold (born 4 July 1972) is a former professional footballer who played in the Football League for Carlisle United and Middlesbrough. While at Carlisle, he had a loan spell at Stalybridge Celtic. Arnold then played for Kettering Town for the 1994–95 season, before returning for two seasons at Stalybridge Celtic, before joining Kidderminster Harriers at the start of the 1997–98 campaign. He also played for Southport, Morecambe, Barrow and Workington.
