= Mark Proctor (footballer) =

English footballer and coach

Personal information
- Full name: Mark Gerard Proctor
- Date of birth: 30 January 1961 (age 65)
- Place of birth: Middlesbrough, England
- Height: 5 ft 10 in (1.78 m)
- Position: Midfielder

Senior career*
Years	Team	Apps	(Gls)
1978–1981	Middlesbrough	109	(12)
1981–1983	Nottingham Forest	63	(5)
1983–1987	Sunderland	117	(20)
1987–1989	Sheffield Wednesday	59	(4)
1989–1993	Middlesbrough	120	(6)
1993–1995	Tranmere Rovers	31	(1)
1995–1996	St Johnstone	6	(0)
1996–	South Shields		
1997–1998	Hartlepool United	6	(0)
Total		511	(58)

International career
1978–1979	England Youth	6	(0)
1981–1982	England U21	5	(0)

Managerial career
- 2006: Hibernian (caretaker)
- 2007–2008: Livingston
- 2010: Middlesbrough (caretaker)
- * Club domestic league appearances and goals

Mark Proctor (born 30 January 1961) is an English former footballer and coach.

== Playing career ==
Proctor began his career with Middlesbrough, making his debut in 1978. He joined Nottingham Forest in 1981 for £440,000 before moving on to Sunderland in 1983. He remained with Sunderland for four years before moving to Sheffield Wednesday in 1987 for £275,000. After two years in Sheffield he returned to Middlesbrough in 1989 for £300,000. He had further spells with Tranmere Rovers, South Shields and Hartlepool United before retiring in 1998.

== Managerial career ==
Proctor helped coach Middlesbrough's Academy to the FA Youth Cup in 2004, before becoming their reserve team manager. He then became assistant manager at Darlington and coach at Hibernian. He was manager of Hibernian on a temporary basis for two matches between the departure of Tony Mowbray and the appointment of John Collins. Under his tenure Hibs defeated Dunfermline Athletic 4–0 and lost 2–1 to Aberdeen.

After leaving Hibs in the spring of 2007, Proctor was appointed manager of Livingston on 23 May. He managed the club during the 2007–08 season, but was sacked on 3 June 2008. Proctor rejoined Middlesbrough in September 2008, as under-18 coach. Proctor was promoted to first team coach by Tony Mowbray. After Mowbray was sacked by Middlesbrough in November 2013, Proctor also left the club. He is now retired from football.

== Honours ==
Middlesbrough

- Full Members' Cup runner-up: 1989–90
