= Alan Kernaghan =

Footballer (born 1967)

Personal information
- Full name: Alan Nigel Kernaghan
- Date of birth: 25 April 1967 (age 59)
- Place of birth: Otley, England
- Height: 6 ft 1 in (1.85 m)
- Position: Defender

Senior career*
Years	Team	Apps	(Gls)
1985–1993	Middlesbrough	202	(16)
1991	→ Charlton Athletic (loan)	13	(0)
1993–1997	Manchester City	63	(1)
1994	→ Bolton Wanderers (loan)	11	(0)
1996	→ Bradford City (loan)	5	(0)
1997	→ St Johnstone (loan)	12	(1)
1997–2001	St Johnstone	60	(5)
2001	Brechin City	3	(0)
2001–2004	Clyde	63	(3)
2004	Livingston	4	(0)
2005–2006	Falkirk	9	(0)
2006	Dundee	0	(0)
Total		445	(26)

International career
- Northern Ireland Schoolboys
1992–1996	Republic of Ireland	22	(1)

Managerial career
- 2002–2004: Clyde
- 2005–2006: Dundee
- 2013: Brentford (caretaker)
- 2015–2016: Glentoran
- * Club domestic league appearances and goals

Alan Nigel Kernaghan (born 25 April 1967) is a football manager and former professional player.

As a player, he was a defender from 1985 to 2006, notably in the Premier League for Manchester City and in the Football League for Middlesbrough, Charlton Athletic, Bolton Wanderers and Bradford City. He played the final nine years of his career playing in Scotland with St Johnstone, Brechin City, Clyde, Livingston, Falkirk and Dundee. Born in England, he was capped 26 times by the Republic of Ireland, scoring one goal.

During his coaching career, Kernaghan has managed Scottish clubs Clyde and Dundee, and Glentoran in the Northern Irish league, which he resigned from after an embarrassing 3–2 defeat to struggling Championship side Annagh United. He has also worked for other clubs in a variety of coaching roles.

== Playing career ==
Born in Otley, West Yorkshire, England, Kernaghan moved with his family to Bangor, County Down at the age of four. He represented Northern Ireland at schoolboy level and the Republic of Ireland at senior level. He began his playing career as an apprentice at Middlesbrough, and went on to make 212 appearances during an eight-year period, scoring 16 goals.

In September 1993, Kernaghan was signed for Manchester City by then-boss Brian Horton. He went on loan to various clubs—Bolton Wanderers in 1994, Bradford City in 1996, and then to St Johnstone in 1997. The Saints signed him on a permanent deal just before the end of the year, after he was given a free transfer from Manchester City. He enjoyed four years at McDiarmid Park, making 60 league appearances and scoring five goals. Kernaghan then joined Brechin City, but he made only three competitive appearances for the club. He then moved to Clyde, where he started as a player but was promoted to a player/manager role in the 2003–04 season. He guided Clyde to a second-placed finish in the First Division, behind Inverness Caley Thistle, a division which they led for the majority of the season. Kernaghan made 63 appearances for Clyde as a player, scoring three goals.

Kernaghan's next move was to Livingston as assistant manager to Allan Preston. He was on a player/assistant manager role at the club, making four first team appearances for Livingston, but he was sacked along with Preston after a poor run of results. Kernaghan next moved to Falkirk, where he took up a player/coach role.

== Coaching career ==
Kernaghan was appointed Dundee manager in September 2005. He was removed from the position, after an unsuccessful spell, in April 2006. After this, Kernaghan became the first former Republic of Ireland player to hold a coaching role at Rangers. He left this position in February 2012 to join Brentford. Kernaghan made an appearance as a player during a 2013–14 pre-season friendly versus FC Einheit Rudolstadt, replacing Aaron Pierre after 65 minutes. He left Brentford in December 2013, after new manager Mark Warburton decided to make changes to the club's coaching staff.

Kernaghan was appointed manager of Glentoran in November 2015. Losing to Annagh United in the League Cup on 30 August 2016 was the final game in charge for Kernaghan, he then tendered his resignation after the game.

=== Rangers ===
Kernaghan was Rangers under 20's manager from 10 December 2006 until 24 February 2012. Players coming through Rangers Academy during that period included Steven McLaren (Sheffield Wednesday), Hamed Namouchi (Tunisian International), Alan Hutton, Charlie Adam, Dean Furman (Oldham Athletic), and Danny Wilson (Liverpool)

== International career ==
Brought up in Bangor, Northern Ireland, Kernaghan played for Northern Ireland Schoolboys six times. However, as the Irish Football Association policy at the time did not select players who were not or whose parents were not born in Northern Ireland, he wasn't selected for the senior team. Due to his grandmother being an Irish citizen he was entitled to Irish citizenship, and he was selected by Jack Charlton to play for the Republic of Ireland. Kernaghan earned 22 caps, scored one goal and was selected for the 1994 FIFA World Cup.

== Personal life ==
Kernaghan has Type 1 diabetes.

== Honours ==
Middlesbrough

- Full Members' Cup runner-up: 1989–90

== See also ==
- List of Republic of Ireland international footballers born outside the Republic of Ireland
