= Jimmy Phillips (footballer, born 1966) =

English footballer (born 1966)

Personal information
- Full name: James Neil Phillips
- Date of birth: 8 February 1966 (age 60)
- Place of birth: Bolton, Lancashire, England
- Height: 6 ft 0 in (1.83 m)
- Position: Defender

Senior career*
Years	Team	Apps	(Gls)
1983–1987	Bolton Wanderers	108	(2)
1987–1988	Rangers	25	(0)
1988–1990	Oxford United	79	(8)
1990–1993	Middlesbrough	139	(6)
1993–2001	Bolton Wanderers	221	(3)
Total		572	(19)

Managerial career
- 2005–2008: Bolton Wanderers Reserves
- 2008–2020: Bolton Wanderers Academy
- 2012: Bolton Wanderers (caretaker)
- 2016: Bolton Wanderers (caretaker)
- 2019: Bolton Wanderers (caretaker)
- * Club domestic league appearances and goals

James Neil Phillips (born 8 February 1966) is an English football coach and former professional footballer.

As a player, he was a defender who notably played in the Premier League for Middlesbrough and Bolton Wanderers. He also played in the Scottish Premiership for Rangers and in the Football League with Oxford United. Whilst at Bolton he played in the 1995 Football League Cup Final.

Following retirement, he returned and has coached their reserve and academy teams as well as holding the position of first team caretaker manager on three occasions. The last role he held at the club was academy director.

== Coaching career ==
Phillips joined the Bolton Wanderers youth coaching staff whilst still a player for the team, starting his role as a coach on 1 June 2000, then retired as a player a year later, though he played no matches during his final season as a registered player/coach.

On 9 October 2012, Phillips was appointed joint caretaker manager of Bolton alongside Sammy Lee following the sacking of Owen Coyle. However, Phillips took control of first team affairs, with Lee and Julian Darby assisting him.

Phillips first game in temporary charge saw him lead his hometown club to a 3–2 victory over Bristol City at the Reebok Stadium with Bolton having recovered from being two goals down early in the game. His second match in caretaker charge came at Wolverhampton Wanderers Molineux Stadium which ended in a 2–2 draw with Mark Davies scoring a 90th-minute equaliser for Bolton.

On 23 October 2012, Crystal Palace confirmed that manager Dougie Freedman had left the club for Bolton Wanderers. Bolton were yet to confirm the appointment though and Phillips then confirmed he would be in charge of the next match against Middlesbrough whilst Freedman was still in discussions with Gartside. Bolton lost 2–1. When Freedman was appointed, Phillips went back to coaching the youth team.

On 15 March 2016, he assumed interim charge of the Bolton team following the departure of Neil Lennon by mutual consent, and did the same in August 2019 after Phil Parkinson resigned. On 21 July 2020, the club confirmed that Phillips had stepped down from his role as Academy Director as a result of Bolton dropping to a Category Three Academy, ending a thirty year association with the club.

== Personal life ==
Jimmy's son, Nat Phillips, is also a footballer and played for him in the Bolton Wanderers academy. He now plays as a centre back for West Bromwich Albion.

== Managerial statistics ==
As of 31 August 2019

Team	From	To	Record				
Team	From	To	G	W	D	L	Win %
Bolton Wanderers (caretaker)	9 October 2012	27 October 2012	3	1	1	1	33.33
Bolton Wanderers (caretaker)	15 March 2016	10 June 2016	10	1	1	8	10.00
Bolton Wanderers (caretaker)	21 August 2019	31 August 2019	3	0	1	2	0.00
Total			16	3	2	11	18.8

== Honours ==
Bolton Wanderers

- Football League First Division: 1996–97; play-offs: 1995
- Football League Cup runner-up: 1994–95
- Associate Members' Cup runner-up: 1985–86

Rangers

- Scottish League Cup: 1987–88
