= Stephen Pears =

English footballer

Personal information
- Date of birth: 22 January 1962 (age 64)
- Place of birth: Brandon, County Durham, England
- Height: 5 ft 11 in (1.80 m)
- Position: Goalkeeper

Team information
- Current team: Gateshead (goalkeeping coach)

Senior career*
Years	Team	Apps	(Gls)
1979–1985	Manchester United	4	(0)
1983	→ Middlesbrough (loan)	12	(0)
1985–1995	Middlesbrough	327	(0)
1995–1996	Liverpool	0	(0)
1996–1998	Hartlepool United	15	(0)
Total		358	(0)

Managerial career
- 2014: Hartlepool United (caretaker)
- * Club domestic league appearances and goals

Stephen Pears (born 22 January 1962) is an English former footballer. Born in Brandon, County Durham, he played as a goalkeeper for Manchester United, Middlesbrough, Liverpool and Hartlepool United in a career spanning 20 years. His son, Ainsley Pears, is also a professional footballer, who currently plays for Blackburn Rovers.

== Career ==
Stephen Pears started his career at Manchester United as an understudy to Gary Bailey. However, Pears struggled to displace him and break into the first team. During the 1983–84 season, in order to gain match practice, he was sent to Middlesbrough on loan where he became a fan favourite. Middlesbrough attempted to sign him permanently but the club failed to raise the £80,000 fee. However, Middlesbrough made a second attempt to sign Pears and he transferred to the club permanently in 1985.

The following season saw the club get relegated. Despite this, his performances gained him critical acclaim from the fans. In 1987–88, Pears helped the club win promotion. In this season, Pears also set a club record of seven consecutive clean sheets. Some of his most notable performances this year came against Everton in the FA Cup and against Leicester City in a performance which he dedicated to his late father. Pears went to make over 400 appearances for Middlesbrough from 1983 to 1995. During this time in 1992 he was called up to the England squad but had to pull out of the squad after breaking his cheekbone after a collision with Dion Dublin.

He was released in 1995 after a sell out testimonial match, which also became the last match at Ayresome Park before Middlesbrough moved to the Riverside Stadium. In this match, Pears was allowed to take a penalty which gave him the prestige of being the last person to score a goal at Ayresome Park.

Pears then moved on to Liverpool to provide goalkeeping cover for David James, and was issued with the number 27 shirt.

However, after making no appearances he moved on to Hartlepool shortly after where he played 19 times before retiring at the age of 35.

== Coaching career ==
Pears was the Middlesbrough Academy goalkeeping coach where he helped to bring through the likes of Ross Turnbull and David Knight. He moved up from his Academy coach role to become the club's goalkeeping coach in 2007 when Paul Barron left for Newcastle United in 2007.

Pears position of goalkeeping coach for the Middlesbrough first team was terminated on 21 November 2013 after Middlesbrough appointed their new manager, Aitor Karanka. Karanka replaced Pears with the Uruguayan, Leo Percovich.

On 4 July 2014, Pears was announced as assistant manager and goalkeeping coach at Hartlepool United. On 5 October, Pears was named caretaker-manager alongside Sam Collins following the departure of Colin Cooper and was kept on as goalkeeping coach following the appointment of Paul Murray as manager on 23 October.

On 19 July 2015, Pears was announced as goalkeeping coach at National League side Gateshead.

== Honours ==
Middlesbrough

- Football League Second Division play-offs: 1988
- Full Members' Cup runner-up: 1989–90
