= Gary Parkinson =

English footballer (born 1968)

Personal information
- Full name: Gary Anthony Parkinson
- Date of birth: 10 January 1968 (age 58)
- Place of birth: Thornaby, England
- Height: 5 ft 10 in (1.78 m)
- Position: Right-back

Senior career*
Years	Team	Apps	(Gls)
1985–1986	Everton	0	(0)
1986–1993	Middlesbrough	202	(5)
1992	→ Southend United (loan)	6	(0)
1993–1994	Bolton Wanderers	3	(0)
1994–1997	Burnley	135	(4)
1997–2001	Preston North End	88	(6)
2001–2002	Blackpool	24	(0)
2002–2003	Stalybridge Celtic	2	(0)
2003	Rossendale United		
Total		460	(15)
- * Club domestic league appearances and goals

Gary Anthony Parkinson (born 10 January 1968) is an English former professional footballer who played as a right-back.

In 2006, he was appointed Head of Youth at his former club Blackpool, a role he occupied until he suffered a severe stroke in September 2010, leading to a diagnosis of locked-in syndrome.

== Career ==
=== Playing career ===
==== Early career: Everton and Middlesbrough ====
Thornaby-born Parkinson started his career as a junior at Everton in 1985 before signing for Middlesbrough, who were then in the Second Division, on 17 January 1986, although they were relegated at the end of the season to the Third Division. Parkinson's first team debut came in the following season on 23 August 1986 in a 2–2 home draw against Port Vale which was played at Victoria Park, Hartlepool. With Middlesbrough on the verge of extinction, the official receiver had locked the club out of Ayresome Park. However, they went on to win promotion as runners-up under Bruce Rioch's management. In the 1987–88 Middlesbrough won a second promotion in two years, winning a promotion/relegation play-off against Chelsea after finishing in third place in the Second Division. Chelsea were then replaced by Middlesbrough in the First Division. The following season though he was relegated with Middlesbrough back to the Second Division. In the 1989–90 season he played in the Full Members Cup final (then known as the Zenith Data Systems Cup) as Middlesbrough lost 1–0 to Chelsea at Wembley. He was part of the team that won promotion again, finishing as Second Division runner-up in the 1991–92 season. The following season, he was a member of the Middlesbrough squad in the inaugural Premier League season as Middlesbrough once again lasted just one season in the top flight and were relegated.

In October 1992 he spent a short time on loan with Southend United who were then in the First Division. He made a total of 265 appearances in all competitions and scored eight league goals while at Middlesbrough.

==== Bolton Wanderers ====
Later that season, he followed former Middlesbrough manager Bruce Rioch, when on 2 March 1993 Rioch signed him on a free transfer for Bolton Wanderers, who were then in the Second Division, and who promoted at the end of the season. However, Parkinson made only three league appearances for them, with just one start after failing to displace the long serving Phil Brown. He was transfer listed by Rioch along with three other first team players in September 1993

==== Burnley ====
He signed for Second Division club Burnley the following season on 27 January 1994. Burnley were promoted to the First Division through the play-offs at the end of the season. They beat Stockport County in the play-off final at Wembley, with Parkinson scoring the crucial winning goal that sealed their promotion. Burnley were though relegated the following season. On 18 November 1995 in a 3–1 defeat against Shrewsbury Town at Gay Meadow Parkinson tore a hamstring and was out of action until the new year.

==== Preston North End ====
On the eve of the 1997–98 season he signed for Burnley's Lancashire rivals Preston North End for £50,000. He became a regular in the team, but 18 months later he injured his cruciate ligament and needed an operation which kept him out of action for twelve months. He had made just one league appearance in the 1998–99 season and missed Prestons promotion as Second Division champions in the 1999–2000 season. He returned to action the following seasons as the club played their first season back in the second tier of English football for the first time in twenty years under manager David Moyes, with a return to action coming in December 1999.

==== Blackpool ====
On 22 March 2001 he signed for Preston's West Lancashire rivals Blackpool, then playing in the Third Division, for a fee of £20,000. He made 24 league appearances for the Seasiders winning promotion to the Second Division through the play-offs in the 2000–01 season, the fifth promotion win of his career. He was released at the end of the 2001–02 season and went on to play part-time with Northern Premier League (NPL) club Stalybridge Celtic on 17 August 2002. However, his stay lasted just two weeks, playing in four matches before leaving on 30 August. He also played part-time with fellow NPL club Rossendale United, whom he signed for on 11 February 2003.

=== Coaching career ===
After retiring from playing football Parkinson studied for his UEFA coaching badges, and also worked for an organisation called SpeedMark, who employ ex-pro footballers to help schools raise money through football. Parkinson left SpeedMark in June 2006 to become the Head of the Youth Department at Blackpool, in charge of all youth team affairs. The youth team compete in the Football League Youth Alliance, North West Conference. In the 2007–08 season he won the Lancashire FA Youth Cup with Blackpool on 28 April 2008 when they beat Wigan Athletic 2–0 at Bloomfield Road.

== Masters football ==
In June 2003 Parkinson played for Middlesbrough in the annual Northern Masters football tournament at the Metro Radio Arena in Newcastle-Upon-Tyne, scoring two goals. He appeared again for Middlesbrough in the 2004 Northern Masters.

== Personal life ==
Parkinson has three children with his wife, Debbie.

He suffered a stroke on 6 September 2010. After being admitted to Royal Bolton Hospital, he was transferred to Salford Royal hospital two days later. Five days later, the Blackpool team, who all wore undershirts with messages of support for Parkinson, dedicated their 2–0 win at Newcastle United to Parkinson. On 18 September it was confirmed that he had locked-in syndrome, one of the most severe consequences of a stroke.

He is now back at Royal Bolton, where he has been reviewed by a neuro-rehabilitation specialist.

== Honours ==
=== As a player ===
Middlesbrough

- Football League Second Division play-offs: 1988
- Full Members' Cup runner-up: 1989–90

Burnley

- Football League Second Division play-offs: 1994

Blackpool

- Football League Third Division play-offs: 2001

Individual

- PFA Team of the Year: 1996–97 Second Division, 1997–98 Second Division

=== As a coach ===
Blackpool

- Lancashire FA Youth Cup: 2007–08
