= 1989–90 Full Members' Cup =

Tournament details
- Country: England
- Teams: 37

Final positions
- Champions: Chelsea (2nd title)
- Runners-up: Middlesbrough
- Semifinalists: Aston Villa; Crystal Palace

Tournament statistics
- Matches played: 36

The 1989–90 Full Members' Cup, known as the Zenith Data Systems Cup for sponsorship reasons, was the 5th staging of a knock-out competition for English football clubs in the First and Second Division. The winners were Chelsea and the runners-up were Middlesbrough.

The competition began on 7 November 1989 and ended with the final on 25 March 1990 at the Wembley Stadium.

In the first round, there were two sections: North and South. In the following rounds each section gradually eliminates teams in knock-out fashion until each has a winning finalist. At this point, the two winning finalists face each other in the combined final for the honour of the trophy.

Liverpool, Arsenal, Tottenham, Manchester United, Everton, Southampton and Queens Park Rangers opted out of this competition.

== First round ==
=== Northern Section ===
Date	Home team	Score	Away team
7 November	Leeds United	1–0	Blackburn Rovers
7 November	Sheffield United	1–0	Wolverhampton Wanderers
14 November	Sunderland	1–2	Port Vale

=== Southern Section ===
Date	Home team	Score	Away team
29 November	Coventry City	1–3	Wimbledon
8 November	Oxford United	2–3	Luton Town

== Second round ==
=== Northern Section ===
Date	Home team	Score	Away team
28 November	Barnsley	1–2	Leeds United
28 November	Hull City	1–2	Aston Villa
29 November	Middlesbrough	3–1	Port Vale
28 November	Newcastle United	2–0	Oldham Athletic
29 November	Nottingham Forest	3–2	Manchester City
21 November	Sheffield Wednesday	3–2	Sheffield United
28 November	Stoke City	2–1	Bradford City
29 November	West Bromwich Albion	0–5	Derby County

=== Southern Section ===
Date	Home team	Score	Away team
28 November	AFC Bournemouth	2–3	Chelsea
14 November	Charlton Athletic	2–1	Leicester City
27 November	Crystal Palace	4–1	Luton Town
21 November	Ipswich Town	4–1	Watford
29 November	Norwich City	5–0	Brighton & Hove Albion
5 December	Portsmouth	0–1	Wimbledon
13 December	Swindon Town	2–1	Millwall
29 November	West Ham United	5–2	Plymouth Argyle

== Third round ==
=== Northern Section ===
Date	Home team	Score	Away team
22 December	Aston Villa	2–1	Nottingham Forest
20 December	Middlesbrough	4–1	Sheffield Wednesday
20 December	Newcastle United	3–2	Derby County
19 December	Stoke City	2–2	Leeds United
Leeds United won 5–4 on penalties

=== Southern Section ===
Date	Home team	Score	Away team
22 December	Chelsea	4–3	West Ham United
19 December	Crystal Palace	2–0	Charlton Athletic
21 December	Ipswich Town	3–1	Wimbledon
24 January	Swindon Town	4–1	Norwich City

== Area semi-finals ==
=== Northern Section ===
Date	Home team	Score	Away team
17 January	Aston Villa	2–0	Leeds United
23 January	Middlesbrough	1–0	Newcastle United

=== Southern Section ===
Date	Home team	Score	Away team
13 February	Crystal Palace	1–0	Swindon Town
23 January	Ipswich Town	2–3	Chelsea

== Area finals ==
=== Northern Area final ===
Date	Home team	Score	Away team
30 January	Aston Villa	1–2	Middlesbrough
6 February	Middlesbrough	2–1	Aston Villa

Middlesbrough beat Aston Villa 4–2 on aggregate.

=== Southern Area final ===
Date	Home team	Score	Away team
21 February	Crystal Palace	0–2	Chelsea
12 March	Chelsea	2–0	Crystal Palace

Chelsea beat Crystal Palace 4–0 on aggregate.

== Final ==
1990-03-25
15:00 BST

Chelsea	1–0	Middlesbrough
Dorigo 26'

Wembley Stadium, London
Attendance: 76,369
Referee: R. Milford, Bristol
