= 1998–99 Hibernian F.C. season =

Hibernian
1998–99 season
- Manager: Alex McLeish
- SFL First Division: 1st (promoted)
- Scottish Cup: R3
- League Cup: Quarter
- Top goalscorer: League: Crawford, 14; All: Crawford, 15
- Highest home attendance: 14801
- Lowest home attendance: 8649
- Average home league attendance: 10433 (down 1592)

Season 1998–99 was a successful season for Hibernian F.C. as the club got promoted on their first attempt and achieved a record number of points, following their relegation from the Scottish Premier League the year prior. There was disappointment in the cup competitions, however, as the club were beaten by Stirling Albion in the Scottish Cup, and were defeated convincingly 4–0 by St Johnstone in the League Cup. As a First Division club, Hibs would have entered the Scottish Challenge Cup, but the competition was not played during the 1998–99 season due to a lack of sponsorship.

== League season ==
=== Results ===
4 August 1998 SFL First Division	Greenock Morton	0–1	Hibernian	Cappielow Park, Greenock
			Lavety 90'	Attendance: 4,600; Referee: Young

15 August 1998 SFL First Division	Hibernian	1–2	Stranraer	Easter Road, Edinburgh
	Skinner		Black 48' (pen.); Young 58'	Attendance: 8,000

22 August 1998 SFL First Division	Falkirk	1–1	Hibernian	Brockville Park, Falkirk
	Keith 21'		Dennis 52'	Attendance: 5,758; Referee: Dallas

29 August 1998 SFL First Division	Hibernian	4–2	Ayr United	Easter Road, Edinburgh
	Guggi 14'; Crawford 15', 73' (pen.); Lovell 69'		Hurst 49'; Findlay 57' (pen.)	Attendance: 9,222; Referee: Rowbotham

5 September 1998 SFL First Division	Clydebank	2–2	Hibernian	Boghead Park, Dumbarton
	Teale 73'; Brannigan 90'		Harper 58'; Crawford 89'	Attendance: 1,803; Referee: Mitchell

12 September 1998 SFL First Division	St Mirren	2–0	Hibernian	Love Street, Paisley
	Yardley 38'; Nicolson 82'			Attendance: 3,638

19 September 1998 SFL First Division	Hibernian	3–1	Raith Rovers	Easter Road, Edinburgh
	Crawford 68' (pen.), 89'; Guggi 78'		Wright 60'	Attendance: 8,850

26 September 1998 SFL First Division	Hibernian	0–0	Hamilton Academical	Easter Road, Edinburgh
				Attendance: 9,695; Referee: McCluskey

3 October 1998 SFL First Division	Airdrieonians	1–3	Hibernian	Excelsior Stadium, Airdrie
	Black 63'		McGinlay 26', 50'; Paatelainen 33'	Attendance: 4,995; Referee: Young

10 October 1998 SFL First Division	Stranraer	0–1	Hibernian	Stair Park, Stranraer
			Lovell 87'	Attendance: 2,256

17 October 1998 SFL First Division	Hibernian	2–1	Greenock Morton	Easter Road, Edinburgh
	Prenderville 10'; McGinlay 85'		Twaddle 59'	Attendance: 9,520; Referee: Simpson

24 October 1998 SFL First Division	Ayr United	3–3	Hibernian	Somerset Park, Ayr
	Hurst 3', 71'; Walker 25' (pen.)		Hughes 41', 87'; Paatelainen 85'	Attendance: 4,684; Referee: Dougal

31 October 1998 SFL First Division	Hibernian	2–1	Clydebank	Easter Road, Edinburgh
	McGinlay 33'; Paatelainen 85'		Brown 88'	Attendance: 9,027

7 November 1998 SFL First Division	Raith Rovers	1–3	Hibernian	Stark's Park, Kirkcaldy
	Dargo 86'		McGinlay 59'; Crawford 62' (pen.); Paatelainen 77'	Attendance: 4,927; Referee: Clyde

21 November 1998 SFL First Division	Hamilton Academical	2–2	Hibernian	Firhill Stadium, Glasgow
	Moore 75'; Henderson 88'		Paatelainen 33', 60'	Attendance: 2,288; Referee: Bisset

24 November 1998 SFL First Division	Hibernian	4–1	St Mirren	Easter Road, Edinburgh
	Lovell 28', 35'; Prenderville 42'; McGinlay 75'		Yardley 22'	Attendance: 9,097; Referee: Fleming

28 November 1998 SFL First Division	Hibernian	1–0	Airdrieonians	Easter Road, Edinburgh
	Lovell 82'			Attendance: 9,758; Referee: McCurry

5 December 1998 SFL First Division	Greenock Morton	1–3	Hibernian	Cappielow Park, Greenock
	Fenwick 89'		Crawford 5'; Lovell 83'; Rougier 90'	Attendance: 3,150; Referee: Rowbotham

12 December 1998 SFL First Division	Hibernian	2–1	Falkirk	Easter Road, Edinburgh
	Hughes 6'; Crawford 69'		Crabbe 79' (pen.)	Attendance: 12,570; Referee: Dougal

19 December 1998 SFL First Division	Hibernian	3–0	Clydebank	Easter Road, Edinburgh
	McGinlay 10', 90'; Latapy 90'			Attendance: 9,060; Referee: Clark

26 December 1998 SFL First Division	Hibernian	3–0	Ayr United	Easter Road, Edinburgh
	McGinlay 25'; Paatelainen 41', 58'			Attendance: 14,106; Referee: McCluskey

2 January 1999 SFL First Division	Hibernian	5–1	Raith Rovers	Easter Road, Edinburgh
	Lovell 1'; McGinlay 12', 43'; Latapy 22'; McEwan 72' (o.g.)		Dargo 39'	Attendance: 14,703; Referee: Herald

9 January 1999 SFL First Division	St Mirren	1–2	Hibernian	Love Street, Paisley
	Kerr 87'		Paatelainen 51'; Hartley 82'	Attendance: 6,064; Referee: Toner

16 January 1999 SFL First Division	Hibernian	4–0	Hamilton Academical	Easter Road, Edinburgh
	Paatelainen 37', 61'; Lavety 68'; McGinlay 90'			Attendance: 10,229; Referee: Dallas

30 January 1999 SFL First Division	Airdrieonians	1–3	Hibernian	Excelsior Stadium, Airdrie
	Black 30' (pen.)		Paatelainen 40'; Lovell 57', 87'	Attendance: 4,763; Referee: Clyde

6 February 1999 SFL First Division	Hibernian	2–0	Stranraer	Easter Road, Edinburgh
	Crawford 31', 35'			Attendance: 8,649; Referee: Elmslie

20 February 1999 SFL First Division	Falkirk	1–2	Hibernian	Brockville Park, Falkirk
	Keith 52'		Hartley 45' den Bieman 67' (o.g.)	Attendance: 5,978; Referee: Toner

27 February 1999 SFL First Division	Ayr United	1–3	Hibernian	Somerset Park, Ayr
	Ferguson 5' (pen.)		Crawford 19' (pen.), 44', 77'	Attendance: 5,010; Referee: Clark

13 March 1999 SFL First Division	Clydebank	2–0	Hibernian	Boghead Park, Dumbarton
	Elliot 43'; Love 57'			Attendance: 1,695; Referee: Mitchell

20 March 1999 SFL First Division	Hibernian	3–0	Airdrieonians	Easter Road, Edinburgh
	Dennis 6'; Holsgrove 14'; Lovering 90'			Attendance: 9,990; Referee: Martindale

3 April 1999 SFL First Division	Hamilton Academical	0–2	Hibernian	Firhill Stadium, Glasgow
			Latapy 32', 51'	Attendance: 4,350; Referee: Rowbotham

10 April 1999 SFL First Division	Raith Rovers	1–3	Hibernian	Stark's Park, Kirkcaldy
	Holmes 29'		Latapy 12'; Dennis 52'; Marinkov 84'	Attendance: 5,740; Referee: Elmslie

17 April 1999 SFL First Division	Hibernian	2–1	St Mirren	Easter Road, Edinburgh
	Hartley 72'; Latapy 85'		McGarry 32'	Attendance: 8,969; Referee: McCurry

24 April 1999 SFL First Division	Hibernian	2–1	Greenock Morton	Easter Road, Edinburgh
	Lovell 11'; Sauzee 42'		Anderson 7'	Attendance: 8,874; Referee: Clark

1 May 1999 SFL First Division	Stranraer	0–4	Hibernian	Stair Park, Stranraer
			Lovell 20'; Crawford 56'; Miller 77'; Hartley 80'	Attendance: 1,380; Referee: Clyde

8 May 1999 SFL First Division	Hibernian	2–1	Falkirk	Easter Road, Edinburgh
	Sauzee 45'; Hartley 47'		Crabbe 71'	Attendance: 14,843; Referee: Freeland

=== Final table ===
Pos	Team	Pld	W	D	L	GF	GA	GD	Pts	Promotion or relegation
1	Hibernian (C, P)	36	28	5	3	84	33	+51	89	Promotion to the Premier League
2	Falkirk	36	20	6	10	60	38	+22	66	
3	Ayr United	36	19	5	12	66	42	+24	62	
4	Airdrieonians	36	18	5	13	42	43	−1	59	
5	St Mirren	36	14	10	12	42	43	−1	52	

Source: "1998-1999 First Division - SPFL Archive". SPFL.
Rules for classification: 1) points; 2) goal difference; 3) number of goals scored.
(C) Champions; (P) Promoted

== Scottish League Cup ==
=== Results ===
8 August 1998 Scottish League Cup	Hamilton Academical	1–2	Hibernian	Firhill Stadium, Glasgow
	McFarlane 67'		Skinner; Lovell 89'	Attendance: 3,063; Referee: Freeland

19 August 1998 Scottish League Cup	Hibernian	1–0	Aberdeen	Easter Road, Edinburgh
	Crawford 82' (pen.)			Attendance: 10,500; Referee: Dougal

8 September 1998 Scottish League Cup	St Johnstone	4–0	Hibernian	McDiarmid Park, Perth
	Lowndes 11', 32'; McMahon 24'; O'Neil 57'			Attendance: 8,165; Referee: Young

== Scottish Cup ==
=== Results ===
23 January 1999 Scottish Cup	Hibernian	1–1	Stirling Albion	Easter Road, Edinburgh
	Lovering 76'		Nicholas 20'	Attendance: 8,730; Referee: Simpson

2 February 1999 Scottish Cup	Stirling Albion	2–1	Hibernian	Forthbank Stadium, Stirling
	McCallum 14'; Jackson 58'		Latapy 36'	Attendance: 3,592; Referee: Simpson

== Transfers ==
=== Players in ===
Player	From	Fee
(Scotland) Bryan Gunn	Norwich City	Free
(Australia) Stuart Lovell	Reading	Free
(England) Paul Holsgrove	Brighton & Hove Albion	£110,000
(Finland) Mixu Paatelainen	Wolverhampton Wanderers	£75,000
(Scotland) Paul Lovering	Clydebank	£100,000
(Scotland) Derek Collins	Greenock Morton	£120,000
(Scotland) Paul Hartley	Raith Rovers	£250,000
(Scotland) Tom Smith	Clydebank	Free
(France) Franck Sauzee	Montpellier HSC	Free
(France) Alex Marinkov	Scarborough	£25,000

=== Players out ===
Player	To	Fee
(Scotland) Jamie McQuilken	Falkirk	Free
(Scotland) Andy Dow	Aberdeen	£80,000
(Scotland) Darren Dods	St Johnstone	£70,000
(Scotland) Willie Miller	Dundee	Free
(Scotland) Graeme Donald	Stirling Albion	Free
(Scotland) Gordon Hunter	Canberra Cosmos	Free
(Scotland) Stuart McCaffrey	Aberdeen	Free
(Benin) Jimmy Boco	Retired	Free
(Scotland) Ian McDonald	Stenhousemuir	Free
(Scotland) John Martin	East Fife	Free
(Scotland) Kevin Harper	Derby County	£300,000
(Iceland) Bjarni Larusson	Walsall	Free
(Trinidad and Tobago) Tony Rougier	Port Vale	£175,000
(Scotland) Rab Shannon	East Fife	Free
(Austria) Klaus Dietrich		Free
(Scotland) Bryan Gunn	Retired	Free

=== Loans in ===
Player	From
(Republic of Ireland) Barry Prenderville	Coventry City

=== Loans out ===
Player	To
(Scotland) Paul Riley	Brechin City
(Scotland) Paul Tosh	Partick Thistle
(Scotland) Kenny Miller	Stenhousemuir
(Canada) Emilio Bottiglieri	Albion Rovers
(Scotland) David Elliot	Wigan Athletic
(Scotland) Paul Tosh	Exeter City
(Scotland) Russell Huggon	Stenhousemuir
(Scotland) Jamie Carter	East Stirlingshire

== Player stats ==
During the 1998–99 season, Hibs used 34 different players in competitive games. The table below shows the number of appearances and goals scored by each player. Goalkeeper Olafur Gottskalksson played in every competitive match.

No.	Pos	Nat	Player	Total		First Division		Scottish Cup		League Cup	
No.	Pos	Nat	Player	Apps	Goals	Apps	Goals	Apps	Goals	Apps	Goals
	GK	(Iceland) ISL	Olafur Gottskalksson	41	0	36	0	2	0	3	0
	DF	(Scotland) SCO	Derek Anderson	6	0	6	0	0	0	0	0
	DF	(Scotland) SCO	Derek Collins	17	0	16	0	1	0	0	0
	DF	(Scotland) SCO	Mark Dempsie	10	0	8	0	2	0	0	0
	DF	(Scotland) SCO	Shaun Dennis	36	3	31	3	2	0	3	0
	DF	(Austria) AUT	Klaus Dietrich	1	0	1	0	0	0	0	0
	DF	(Scotland) SCO	David Elliot	11	0	8	0	0	0	3	0
	DF	(Scotland) SCO	John Hughes	26	3	23	3	0	0	3	0
	DF	(Scotland) SCO	Paul Lovering	19	2	17	1	2	1	0	0
	DF	(Republic of Ireland) IRL	Barry Prenderville	13	2	13	2	0	0	0	0
	DF	(Scotland) SCO	Alan Reid	1	0	1	0	0	0	0	0
	DF	(Scotland) SCO	Michael Renwick	19	0	16	0	0	0	3	0
	DF	(Scotland) SCO	Rab Shannon	1	0	1	0	0	0	0	0
	DF	(Scotland) SCO	Tom Smith	6	0	5	0	1	0	0	0
	MF	(Scotland) SCO	Scott Bannerman	12	0	12	0	0	0	0	0
	MF	(Canada) CAN	Emilio Bottiglieri	1	0	1	0	0	0	0	0
	MF	(Austria) AUT	Peter Guggi	10	2	8	2	0	0	2	0
	MF	(Scotland) SCO	Kevin Harper	3	1	2	1	0	0	1	0
	MF	(Scotland) SCO	Paul Hartley	14	5	12	5	2	0	0	0
	MF	(England) ENG	Paul Holsgrove	19	1	17	1	0	0	2	0
	MF	(Trinidad and Tobago) TTO	Russell Latapy	25	7	23	6	2	1	0	0
	MF	(Australia) AUS	Stuart Lovell	36	12	31	11	2	0	3	1
	MF	(France) FRA	Alex Marinkov	10	1	10	1	0	0	0	0
	MF	(Scotland) SCO	Pat McGinlay	35	12	30	12	2	0	3	0
	MF	(Scotland) SCO	Eric Paton	4	0	4	0	0	0	0	0
	MF	(Trinidad and Tobago) TTO	Tony Rougier	18	1	15	1	0	0	3	0
	MF	(France) FRA	Franck Sauzee	9	2	9	2	0	0	0	0
	MF	(England) ENG	Justin Skinner	35	3	30	2	2	0	3	1
	FW	(Scotland) SCO	Stephen Crawford	40	15	35	14	2	0	3	1
	FW	(Scotland) SCO	Barry Lavety	28	2	25	2	1	0	2	0
	FW	(Scotland) SCO	Tam McManus	1	0	1	0	0	0	0	0
	FW	(Scotland) SCO	Kenny Miller	8	1	7	1	0	0	1	0
	FW	(Finland) FIN	Mixu Paatelainen	28	12	26	12	2	0	0	0
	FW	(Scotland) SCO	Paul Tosh	1	0	1	0	0	0	0	0

== See also ==
- List of Hibernian F.C. seasons
