= 1999–2000 Hibernian F.C. season =

Hibernian
1999–2000 season
- Manager: Alex McLeish
- SPL: 6th
- Scottish Cup: Semi
- League Cup: R3
- Top goalscorer: League: Miller, 11; All: Miller, 13
- Highest home attendance: 16976
- Lowest home attendance: 9211
- Average home league attendance: 12070 (up 1637)

Season 1999–2000 was Hibs' first season back in the top flight of Scottish football, the newly founded Scottish Premier League, after gaining promotion from the First Division in 1999. Hibs re-established themselves well in the top flight, finishing in sixth place. The club also had a good Scottish Cup run, but were disappointingly beaten 2–1 by Aberdeen, who finished bottom of the SPL, in the semi-final at Hampden Park. The season was also memorable for Hibs fans due to a 3–0 win in the "Millennium derby" against Hearts. There was a landmark day towards the end of the season, as the last game on the Easter Road slope was played.

== League season ==
=== Results ===
31 July 1999 SPL	Hibernian	2–2	Motherwell	Easter Road, Edinburgh
	Lehmann 45', 81'		Nevin 65'; Nicholas 90'	Attendance: 13,058; Referee: Clark

8 August 1999 SPL	Dundee	3–4	Hibernian	Dens Park, Dundee
	Lovering 56' (o.g.); McSkimming 57'; Annand 73' (pen.)		Lehmann 32'; Sauzee 60', 87'; Miller 89'	Attendance: 6,050; Referee: Dallas

14 August 1999 SPL	Hibernian	1–1	Heart of Midlothian	Easter Road, Edinburgh
	Latapy 42' (pen.)		McSwegan 79'	Attendance: 16,976; Referee: Dougal

21 August 1999 SPL	St Johnstone	1–1	Hibernian	McDiarmid Park, Perth
	Lowndes 36'		McAnespie 69' (o.g.)	Attendance: 6,163; Referee: Freeland

28 August 1999 SPL	Hibernian	0–1	Rangers	Easter Road, Edinburgh
			Johansson 69'	Attendance: 15,585; Referee: Rowbotham

11 September 1999 SPL	Dundee United	3–1	Hibernian	Tannadice Park, Dundee
	Talesnikov 4'; Hannah 71'; Dodds 90' (pen.)		Latapy 49'	Attendance: 8,167; Referee: Rowbotham

19 September 1999 SPL	Hibernian	0–3	Kilmarnock	Easter Road, Edinburgh
			Reilly 12'; Jeffrey 71'; McCoist 90' (pen.)	Attendance: 11,337; Referee: Freeland

25 September 1999 SPL	Hibernian	0–2	Celtic	Easter Road, Edinburgh
			Viduka 56', 66'	Attendance: 14,743; Referee: Dallas

2 October 1999 SPL	Aberdeen	2–2	Hibernian	Pittodrie Stadium, Aberdeen
	Jess 58'; Gillies 85'		Paatelainen 82'; Jack 87'	Attendance: 11,876; Referee: Mitchell

16 October 1999 SPL	Motherwell	2–2	Hibernian	Fir Park, Motherwell
	McCulloch 32'; McMillan 67'		Latapy 9' (pen.); Paatelainen 57'	Attendance: 7,559; Referee: Martindale

23 October 1999 SPL	Hibernian	5–2	Dundee	Easter Road, Edinburgh
	Miller 31'; Latapy 40', 79'; Sauzee 63'; Lehmann 90'		Matute 6'; Falconer 73'	Attendance: 10,160; Referee: Clark

31 October 1999 SPL	Hibernian	3–2	Dundee United	Easter Road, Edinburgh
	de Vos 8' (o.g.); Latapy 61' (pen.), 79'		Dodds 1'; Talesnikov 33'	Attendance: 11,073; Referee: Dougal

6 November 1999 SPL	Kilmarnock	0–2	Hibernian	Rugby Park, Kilmarnock
			Miller 70', 87'	Attendance: 8,735; Referee: McCluskey

20 November 1999 SPL	Rangers	2–0	Hibernian	Ibrox Stadium, Glasgow
	Johansson 32'; Albertz 46'			Attendance: 49,323; Referee: Orr

24 November 1999 SPL	Hibernian	0–1	St Johnstone	Easter Road, Edinburgh
			Jones 18'	Attendance: 9,434; Referee: Dallas

27 November 1999 SPL	Hibernian	2–0	Aberdeen	Easter Road, Edinburgh
	McGinlay 25'; Paatelainen 35'			Attendance: 11,628; Referee: Rowbotham

4 December 1999 SPL	Celtic	4–0	Hibernian	Celtic Park, Glasgow
	Viduka 18' (pen.); Moravcik 29', 58'; Wieghorst 86'			Attendance: 60,092; Referee: Dougal

11 December 1999 SPL	Hibernian	2–2	Motherwell	Easter Road, Edinburgh
	Paatelainen 63'; McGinlay 88'		Spencer 70', 89'	Attendance: 9,955; Referee: Simpson

19 December 1999 SPL	Heart of Midlothian	0–3	Hibernian	Tynecastle, Edinburgh
			Lehmann 18'; Sauzee 27'; Miller 90'	Attendance: 17,954; Referee: Young

27 December 1999 SPL	Hibernian	2–2	Kilmarnock	Easter Road, Edinburgh
	Paatelainen 74'; Miller 90'		Smith 16'; Cocard 22' (pen.)	Attendance: 12,408; Referee: Clark

22 January 2000 SPL	Dundee United	0–0	Hibernian	Tannadice Park, Dundee
				Attendance: 7,457; Referee: Rowbotham

6 February 2000 SPL	Hibernian	2–2	Rangers	Easter Road, Edinburgh
	Miller 49', 68'		Wallace 56'; McCann 81'	Attendance: 13,500; Referee: McCurry

22 February 2000 SPL	St Johnstone	1–0	Hibernian	McDiarmid Park, Perth
	O'Halloran 27' (pen.)			Attendance: 8,199; Referee: Clark

26 February 2000 SPL	Aberdeen	4–0	Hibernian	Pittodrie Stadium, Aberdeen
	Stavrum 18', 46'; Guntveit 30'; Anderson 44'			Attendance: 12,625; Referee: Young

5 March 2000 SPL	Hibernian	2–1	Celtic	Easter Road, Edinburgh
	McGinlay 22'; Miller 63'		Viduka 73'	Attendance: 12,236; Referee: McCluskey

18 March 2000 SPL	Hibernian	3–1	Heart of Midlothian	Easter Road, Edinburgh
	Latapy 37'; Sauzee 60'; Paatelainen 85'		Jackson 26'	Attendance: 15,908; Referee: Dallas

21 March 2000 SPL	Hibernian	1–2	Dundee	Easter Road, Edinburgh
	Paatelainen 22'		Falconer 62', 90'	Attendance: 10,208; Referee: Clark

25 March 2000 SPL	Kilmarnock	1–0	Hibernian	Rugby Park, Kilmarnock
	Vareille 52'			Attendance: 8,068; Referee: Dougal

1 April 2000 SPL	Hibernian	1–0	Dundee United	Easter Road, Edinburgh
	Hartley 23'			Attendance: 10,261; Referee: Clyde

15 April 2000 SPL	Hibernian	3–3	St Johnstone	Easter Road, Edinburgh
	Latapy 13'; Paatelainen 48'; Lehmann 90'		O'Neil 68'; McAnespie 72'; Parker 89'	Attendance: 9,211; Referee: Young

22 April 2000 SPL	Celtic	1–1	Hibernian	Celtic Park, Glasgow
	Mahe 79'		Lovell 30'	Attendance: 33,229; Referee: Rowbotham

29 April 2000 SPL	Hibernian	1–0	Aberdeen	Easter Road, Edinburgh
	Miller 53'			Attendance: 9,659; Referee: Orr

3 May 2000 SPL	Rangers	5–2	Hibernian	Ibrox Stadium, Glasgow
	Ferguson 11'; Dodds 17'; Dennis 47' (o.g.); Albertz 81' (pen.), 86'		Miller 49'; Lehmann 72'	Attendance: 39,349; Referee: McCluskey

6 May 2000 SPL	Motherwell	2–0	Hibernian	Fir Park, Motherwell
	Twaddle 70', 73'			Attendance: 5,426; Referee: Clyde

14 May 2000 SPL	Dundee	1–0	Hibernian	Dens Park, Dundee
	Rae 54'			Attendance: 5,061

21 May 2000 SPL	Heart of Midlothian	2–1	Hibernian	Tynecastle, Edinburgh
	Juanjo 30'; McSwegan 62'		Paatelainen 57'	Attendance: 17,391; Referee: Dallas

=== Final table ===
Pos	Team	Pld	W	D	L	GF	GA	GD	Pts
4	Motherwell	36	14	10	12	49	63	−14	52
5	St Johnstone	36	10	12	14	36	44	−8	42
6	Hibernian	36	10	11	15	49	61	−12	41
7	Dundee	36	12	5	19	45	64	−19	41
8	Dundee United	36	11	6	19	34	57	−23	39

Updated to match(es) played on end of season. Source: Scottish Professional Football League
Rules for classification: 1) Points; 2) Goal difference; 3) Goals scored

== Scottish League Cup ==
As a club newly promoted to the SPL, Hibs entered at the second round stage of the competition, in which they defeated Clyde in a penalty shootout. This win sent Hibs through to a third round match against Kilmarnock at Rugby Park. In that match, Hibs conceded two early goals, and despite efforts by Pat McGinlay and Kenny Miller, Kilmarnock ran out 3–2 winners.

=== Results ===
17 August 1999 Scottish League Cup	Clyde	2–2 AET (4 – 5 pen.)	Hibernian	Broadwood Stadium, Cumbernauld
	Woods 14'; Carrigan 30'		McGinlay 9'; Hartley 16'	Attendance: 1,800

12 October 1999 Scottish League Cup	Kilmarnock	3–2	Hibernian	Rugby Park, Kilmarnock
	McCoist 19', 25'; Vareille 68'		McGinlay 40'; Miller 78'	Attendance: 6,837; Referee: Orr

== Scottish Cup ==
=== Results ===
29 January 2000 Scottish Cup	Hibernian	4–1	Dunfermline Athletic	Easter Road, Edinburgh
	Miller 2'; Brebner 38'; Murray 66'; Collins 87'		Graham 32'	Attendance: 10,863; Referee: Dougal

19 February 2000 Scottish Cup	Hibernian	1–1	Clydebank	Easter Road, Edinburgh
	Hartley 66'		Gardner 63' (pen.)	Attendance: 9,988; Referee: Rowbotham

29 February 2000 Scottish Cup	Clydebank	0–3	Hibernian	Cappielow Park, Greenock
			Lovell 39'; Lehmann 73'; Sauzee 81'	Attendance: 2,500; Referee: Rowbotham

11 March 2000 Scottish Cup	Hibernian	3–1	Falkirk	Easter Road, Edinburgh
	Latapy 25', 43' (pen.); McGinlay 90'		Lawrie 32'	Attendance: 13,551; Referee: Young

9 April 2000 Scottish Cup	Hibernian	1–2	Aberdeen	Hampden Park, Glasgow
	Latapy 56'		Stavrum 64'; Dow 68'	Attendance: 22,193; Referee: Dougal

== Transfers ==
=== Players in ===
Player	From	Fee
(Germany) Dirk Lehmann	Fulham	Free
(Scotland) Tom Phillips	Derby County	Free
(Scotland) Colin Morton	Derby County	Free
(Scotland) Ian Murray	Dundee United	Free
(France) Fabrice Henry	FC Basel	Free
(Germany) Mathias Jack	Fortuna Düsseldorf	Free
(Republic of Ireland) Nick Colgan	Bournemouth	Free
(Scotland) Grant Brebner	Reading	Free
(Scotland) Martin McIntosh	Stockport County	£250,000

=== Players out ===
Player	To	Fee
(Scotland) Chris Jackson	Cowdenbeath	Free
(Scotland) David Elliot	Partick Thistle	Free
(Scotland) Brian Welsh	Stenhousemuir	Free
(Austria) Peter Guggi	Retired	Free
(Scotland) Eric Paton	Partick Thistle	Free
(Scotland) Paul Riley	Brechin City	Free
(Scotland) Paul Tosh	Raith Rovers	Free
(Scotland) Jason Gardiner	Stirling Albion	Free
(England) Justin Skinner	Dunfermline Athletic	Free
(Scotland) Barry Lavety	St Mirren	Nominal fee
(Scotland) Stephen Crawford	Dunfermline Athletic	Free
(Iceland) Olafur Gottskalksson	Brentford	Free
(France) Alex Marinkov	Retired	Free
(France) Fabrice Henry	Retired	Free
(England) Paul Holsgrove	Darlington	Free
(Saint Lucia) Earl Jean	W Connection	Free

=== Loans out ===
Player	To
(Scotland) Barry Lavety	St Mirren
(Scotland) Scott Bannerman	Alloa Athletic
(Scotland) Stephen Crawford	Dunfermline Athletic
(England) Paul Holsgrove	Airdrieonians
(Scotland) Liam O'Sullivan	Clydebank
(Scotland) Tam McManus	East Fife
(Scotland) Martin Hughes	Albion Rovers
(Scotland) Russell Huggon	Partick Thistle

== Player stats ==
During the 1999–2000 season, Hibs used 29 different players in competitive games. The table below shows the number of appearances and goals scored by each player.

No.	Pos	Nat	Player	Total		SPL		Scottish Cup		League Cup	
No.	Pos	Nat	Player	Apps	Goals	Apps	Goals	Apps	Goals	Apps	Goals
	GK	(Ireland) EIR	Nick Colgan	32	0	25	0	5	0	2	0
	GK	(Scotland) SCO	Tom Phillips	0	0	0	0	0	0	0	0
	GK	(Iceland) ISL	Olafur Gottskalksson	12	0	12	0	0	0	0	0
	DF	(Scotland) SCO	Derek Collins	30	1	25	0	5	1	0	0
	DF	(Scotland) SCO	Mark Dempsie	9	0	8	0	0	0	1	0
	DF	(Scotland) SCO	Shaun Dennis	25	0	24	0	0	0	1	0
	DF	(Scotland) SCO	Colin Morton	0	0	0	0	0	0	0	0
	DF	(Scotland) SCO	John Hughes	27	0	21	0	5	0	1	0
	DF	(Scotland) SCO	Paul Lovering	12	0	10	0	0	0	2	0
	DF	(Scotland) SCO	Martin McIntosh	11	0	9	0	2	0	0	0
	DF	(Scotland) SCO	Alan Reid	1	0	1	0	0	0	0	0
	DF	(Scotland) SCO	Michael Renwick	14	0	13	0	0	0	1	0
	DF	(Scotland) SCO	Tom Smith	28	0	22	0	5	0	1	0
	MF	(Scotland) SCO	Scott Bannerman	1	0	1	0	0	0	0	0
	MF	(Scotland) SCO	Grant Brebner	34	1	29	0	4	1	1	0
	MF	(Scotland) SCO	Paul Hartley	30	3	25	1	3	1	2	1
	MF	(France) FRA	Fabrice Henry	9	0	9	0	0	0	0	0
	MF	(Germany) GER	Mathias Jack	27	1	23	1	2	0	2	0
	FW	(Saint Lucia) LCA	Earl Jean	5	0	5	0	0	0	0	0
	MF	(Trinidad and Tobago) TRI	Russell Latapy	34	12	28	9	4	3	2	0
	MF	(Australia) AUS	Stuart Lovell	32	2	26	1	5	1	1	0
	MF	(France) FRA	Alex Marinkov	1	0	0	0	0	0	1	0
	MF	(Scotland) SCO	Pat McGinlay	36	6	31	3	3	1	2	2
	MF	(Scotland) SCO	Ian Murray	12	1	10	0	2	1	0	0
	MF	(France) FRA	Franck Sauzee	32	6	26	5	5	1	1	0
	MF	(England) ENG	Justin Skinner	3	0	2	0	0	0	1	0
	FW	(Scotland) SCO	Stephen Crawford	4	0	3	0	0	0	1	0
	FW	(Germany) GER	Dirk Lehmann	37	8	30	7	5	1	2	0
	FW	(Scotland) SCO	Tam McManus	2	0	2	0	0	0	0	0
	FW	(Scotland) SCO	Kenny Miller	39	13	32	11	5	1	2	1
	FW	(Finland) FIN	Mixu Paatelainen	37	9	32	9	4	0	1	0

== See also ==
- List of Hibernian F.C. seasons
