= Paul Hartley =

Scottish footballer (born 1976)

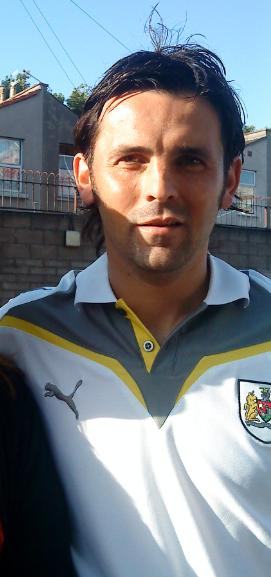
- Hartley with Bristol City in 2009

Personal information
- Full name: Paul Hartley
- Date of birth: 19 October 1976 (age 50)
- Place of birth: Hamilton, Scotland
- Height: 5 ft 10 in (1.78 m)
- Position: Midfielder

Team information
- Current team: Cove Rangers (head coach)

Youth career
- 1993–1994: Hamilton Academical

Senior career*
| Years | Team | Apps | (Gls) |
| 1994–1996 | Hamilton Academical | 47 | (11) |
| 1996–1997 | Millwall | 44 | (4) |
| 1997–1998 | Raith Rovers | 50 | (13) |
| 1998–2000 | Hibernian | 36 | (6) |
| 1999–2000 | → Greenock Morton (loan) | 3 | (1) |
| 2000–2003 | St Johnstone | 87 | (12) |
| 2003–2007 | Heart of Midlothian | 118 | (31) |
| 2007–2009 | Celtic | 62 | (3) |
| 2009–2010 | Bristol City | 40 | (5) |
| 2010–2011 | Aberdeen | 24 | (4) |
| Total | | 511 | (90) |

International career
| 1997 | Scotland U21 | 1 | (0) |
| 2004 | Scotland B | 1 | (0) |
| 2005–2010 | Scotland | 25 | (1) |

Managerial career
- 2011–2014: Alloa Athletic
- 2014–2017: Dundee
- 2017–2018: Falkirk
- 2019–2022: Cove Rangers
- 2022: Hartlepool United
- 2023–: Cove Rangers
- * Club domestic league appearances and goals

Paul Hartley (born 19 October 1976) is a Scottish professional football manager and former player who currently manages Scottish League One club Cove Rangers.

A midfielder, Hartley won trophies with both Hearts and Celtic, and earned 25 caps for the Scotland national team. He also played for Hamilton Academical, Millwall, Raith Rovers, Hibernian, Greenock Morton, St Johnstone, Bristol City and Aberdeen during his career.

As a manager, he guided Alloa Athletic to successive promotions. He then moved to Dundee, who he helped win promotion to the Scottish top flight in 2014. Hartley was sacked by Dundee in March 2017. He was then appointed by Falkirk, but he left this position after less than one year. Hartley joined Cove Rangers in July 2019 and led the club to two promotions before his move to Hartlepool.

A short tenure at Hartlepool United followed before he returned to management in January 2023 for a second spell at Cove Rangers.

== Club career ==
=== Early career ===
Hartley was born in Hamilton, South Lanarkshire. Hartley started his senior career at Hamilton Academical, where he spent two seasons. Millwall paid £380,000 to gain his services in July 1996; this remained Hamilton's biggest sale until James McCarthy moved to Wigan Athletic for an initial £1.2 million in 2009. Hartley returned to Scotland a year later, joining Raith Rovers for £150,000, before moving to Hibernian in 1998, whom he helped win the First Division in 1998–99.

In season 1999–2000, he spent a short spell on loan at Greenock Morton.

=== St Johnstone ===
St Johnstone manager Sandy Clark, who had previously managed Hartley at Hamilton Academical, signed Hartley for a £200,000 fee in 2000. Billy Stark, who succeeded Clark in 2001, started using Hartley as a central attacking midfielder during the 2001–02 season. This change of position from his previous role as a right winger, coincided with a significant upturn in his performances, but it was not enough to prevent St Johnstone's relegation to the First Division. Hartley's personal success continued as he was nominated for the SPFA First Division player of the year award in 2003, but his team failed to gain promotion back to the SPL in 2003.

=== Hearts ===
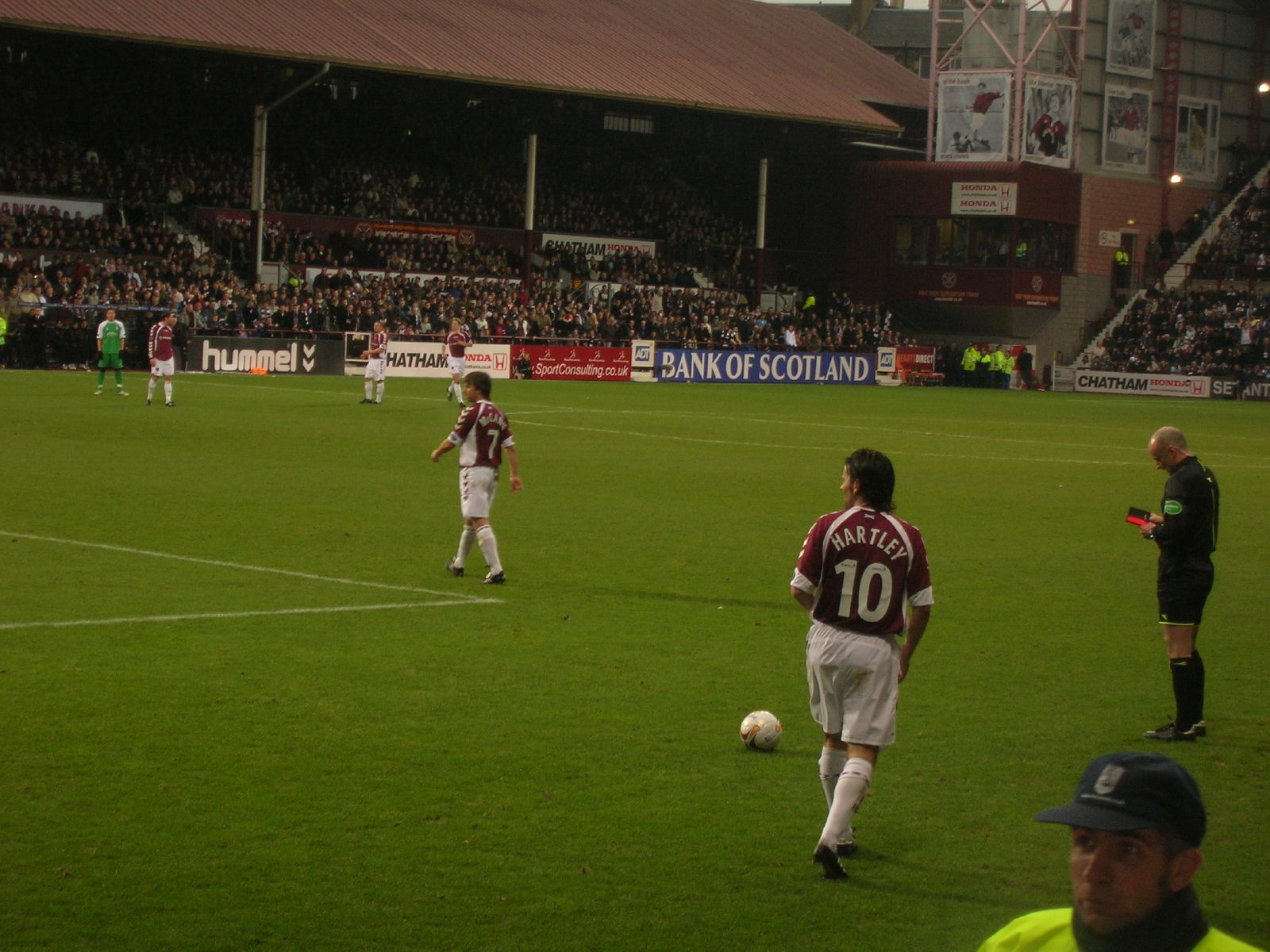
Hartley (no. 10) playing for Heart of Midlothian in 2006

Hearts signed Hartley on a free transfer when his contract with St Johnstone expired in the summer of 2003. He helped Hearts to third place in the Premier League in 2003–04 and starring in their subsequent UEFA Cup run. In January 2005, Celtic attempted to buy Hartley, but their £300,000 offer was considered significantly below Hearts valuation and was rejected. Hartley subsequently signed an improved contract with Hearts.

Hartley scored three goals against archrivals Hibernian in the Scottish Cup semi-final in 2006, his first hat-trick as a professional footballer. Despite his sending off, Hearts defeated Second Division outfit Gretna on penalties in the 2006 Scottish Cup Final.

He was voted as SPL Player of the Year in 2005–06. Hartley was also shortlisted for Scottish Football Writers award in the same season and the SPFA Players' award in 2004–05.

During the January 2007 transfer window, Hartley was linked with Rangers and Premier League club Aston Villa. Hearts manager Valdas Ivanauskas initially responded to the speculation by insisting any transfer bids would not be appreciated. On 26 January, however, Hearts and Ivanauskas admitted that they had now come to the decision to sell their prize assets; both Hartley and Craig Gordon were both dropped for that weekend's match against Rangers.

=== Celtic ===
Hartley signed for Celtic for £1.1 million on a two-and-a-half-year contract, with the option for a further year, in January 2007. On 15 August 2007, he scored his first goal for the club in their Champions League 3rd qualifying round tie against Russian Premier League side Spartak Moscow.

Gordon Strachan usually employed Hartley, who had played as an attacking midfielder for Hearts, in a more defensive role. Playing in the centre of midfield with Barry Robson, Hartley helped Celtic to their third league title in a row in May 2008.

Hartley featured less for Celtic during the 2008–09 season and was released by new manager Tony Mowbray on 1 July 2009.

=== Bristol City ===
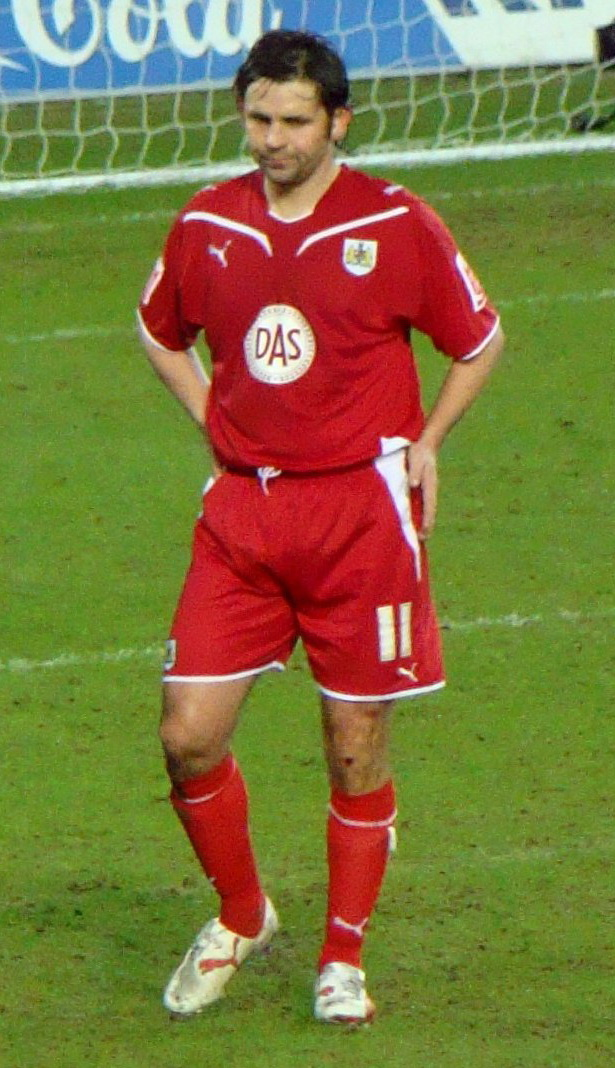
Hartley playing for Bristol City in 2010

After his release by Celtic, Hartley signed for Bristol City. Hartley played his first match for the club in a friendly against Dutch team Ajax before scoring on his competitive debut in a 2–2 draw away to Preston North End. After citing a desire to return to Scotland, Hartley was made available for free transfer by the club in July 2010. He was heavily linked with a return to former club Hearts, but they dropped their interest in Hartley after he refused to distance himself from criticism of majority shareholder Vladimir Romanov during his first stint with the club.

=== Aberdeen ===
Hartley signed for Aberdeen on 28 July 2010 and was appointed as the new club captain on the same day. On his league debut for Aberdeen, Hartley scored a hat-trick of penalty kicks in a 4–0 victory against Hamilton. It was the first time a player had scored a hat-trick of penalties in a Scottish top division match since Donald Ford, for Hearts against Morton, in September 1973. Hartley scored another penalty, against Hibernian in a 4–2 victory, on 23 October 2010. Three days later, Hartley scored both Aberdeen goals in a 2–1 win against Falkirk in the League Cup. This meant that Hartley had scored eight goals for Aberdeen, seven from penalties. Hartley announced his retirement as a player at the end of the 2010–11 season, having missed the last two months of the season due to a medial knee ligament injury.

== International career ==
Hartley's first experiences of international football took place right at the beginning of his professional career when he was selected by manager Craig Brown as a training squad player for Euro 96. His performances for Hearts earned him international recognition in December 2004, when he appeared for Scotland B against Germany B in Mannheim. He won his first full Scotland cap the following year on 26 March 2005, against Italy in the San Siro. Hartley scored his only international goal in a 3–0 win over Slovenia on 12 October 2005.

== Managerial career ==
=== Alloa Athletic ===
Hartley was appointed manager at Alloa Athletic on 17 May 2011, to get Alloa back into the second division having been relegated the season before. He had to rebuild the squad as every player's contract had expired; only three were offered new contracts and only one accepted. Hartley managed to get a full squad together and Alloa won the title on 7 April 2012. He led the side to a successive promotion through the Scottish First Division play-offs in May 2013, relegating Dunfermline Athletic in the process. He resigned after the 5–1 loss against Dumbarton on 18 January 2014.

=== Dundee ===
Hartley signed for Dundee as manager on 5 February 2014, replacing John Brown. He led the Dee to the Scottish Championship title on the final day and promotion to the Scottish Premiership. Dundee went unbeaten in their first 8 games of the season including a 1–1 draw with Celtic. Hartley then declined an offer to manage Cardiff City. Dundee went on to finish sixth in the Premiership, and finished eighth in the following season. Hartley was sacked by Dundee in April 2017, after a run of seven consecutive defeats left them in a relegation play-off position.

=== Falkirk ===
Hartley was appointed Falkirk manager on 4 October 2017, succeeding Peter Houston. After a bad start to the 2018–19 season, Hartley left Falkirk on 27 August 2018.

=== Cove Rangers ===
Hartley joined newly promoted Scottish League Two club Cove Rangers in July 2019, succeeding John Sheran as manager. After immediately guiding the club to win promotion in his first season and reaching League One play-offs in his second one, he led Cove to another promotion in the 2021–22 league campaign, as the club won the League One title and progressed to the Scottish Championship.

=== Hartlepool United ===
On 3 June 2022, Hartley departed Cove to take up the vacant managerial role at EFL League Two club Hartlepool United. During the summer transfer window, Hartley signed 16 new players in a major overhaul of the squad. His first game was a 4–0 loss at Walsall on 30 July. On 30 August, he won a competitive game for the first time at the eighth attempt, a 2–0 home win over Harrogate Town in the EFL Trophy group stage. On 18 September 2022, following a 2–0 defeat to Sutton United, Hartley was sacked by Hartlepool following a poor start to the season, with the club being in 23rd place at the time of his departure. Hartlepool had failed to win any of their first nine League games. Hartlepool would later be relegated to the National League at the end of the 2022–23 season.

=== Return to Cove Rangers ===
On 5 January 2023, Hartley returned to Cove Rangers, succeeding Jim McIntyre as manager and signing a contract until June 2026 with the club.

Despite being 10 points clear of bottom side Hamilton when he returned to the role, Cove would go on to be relegated from the Scottish Championship, meaning Hartley was involved in two relegation campaigns during the 2022–23 season with both Hartlepool United and Cove Rangers.

== Career statistics ==
=== Club ===
Appearances and goals by club, season and competition
| Club | Season | League | | | National cup | | League cup | | Europe | | Other (Note: Includes Scottish Challenge Cup.) | | Total | |
| Club | Season | Division | Apps | Goals | Apps | Goals | Apps | Goals | Apps | Goals | Apps | Goals | Apps | Goals |
|---|---|---|---|---|---|---|---|---|---|---|---|---|---|---|
| Millwall | 1996–97 | Second Division | 44 | 4 | 0 | 0 | 2 | 0 | 0 | 0 | 0 | 0 | 46 | 4 |
| Raith Rovers | 1997–98 | Scottish First Division | 30 | 9 | 2 | 0 | 0 | 0 | 0 | 0 | 1 | 0 | 33 | 9 |
| Raith Rovers | 1998–99 | Scottish First Division | 18 | 4 | 0 | 0 | 2 | 1 | 0 | 0 | 0 | 0 | 20 | 5 |
| Raith Rovers | Total | | 48 | 13 | 2 | 0 | 2 | 1 | 0 | 0 | 1 | 0 | 53 | 14 |
| Hibernian | 1998–99 | Scottish First Division | 12 | 5 | 2 | 0 | 0 | 0 | 0 | 0 | 0 | 0 | 14 | 5 |
| Hibernian | 1999–2000 | Scottish Premier League | 24 | 1 | 3 | 1 | 2 | 1 | 0 | 0 | 0 | 0 | 29 | 3 |
| Hibernian | Total | | 36 | 6 | 5 | 1 | 2 | 1 | 0 | 0 | 0 | 0 | 43 | 8 |
| St Johnstone | 2000–01 | Scottish Premier League | 23 | 2 | 0 | 0 | 2 | 1 | 0 | 0 | 0 | 0 | 25 | 3 |
| St Johnstone | 2001–02 | Scottish Premier League | 32 | 4 | 1 | 0 | 2 | 1 | 0 | 0 | 0 | 0 | 35 | 5 |
| St Johnstone | 2002–03 | Scottish First Division | 32 | 6 | 3 | 0 | 2 | 0 | 0 | 0 | 1 | 0 | 38 | 6 |
| St Johnstone | Total | | 87 | 12 | 4 | 0 | 6 | 2 | 0 | 0 | 1 | 0 | 98 | 14 |
| Heart of Midlothian | 2003–04 | Scottish Premier League | 30 | 3 | 2 | 0 | 2 | 0 | 4 | 0 | 0 | 0 | 38 | 3 |
| Heart of Midlothian | 2004–05 | Scottish Premier League | 33 | 11 | 5 | 0 | 3 | 3 | 5 | 1 | 0 | 0 | 46 | 15 |
| Heart of Midlothian | 2005–06 | Scottish Premier League | 34 | 14 | 4 | 3 | 2 | 0 | 0 | 0 | 0 | 0 | 40 | 17 |
| Heart of Midlothian | 2006–07 | Scottish Premier League | 21 | 3 | 0 | 0 | 1 | 0 | 3 | 0 | 0 | 0 | 25 | 3 |
| Heart of Midlothian | Total | | 118 | 31 | 11 | 3 | 8 | 3 | 12 | 1 | 0 | 0 | 149 | 38 |
| Celtic | 2006–07 | Scottish Premier League | 10 | 0 | 4 | 0 | 0 | 0 | 0 | 0 | 0 | 0 | 14 | 0 |
| Celtic | 2007–08 | Scottish Premier League | 27 | 0 | 2 | 0 | 1 | 0 | 9 | 1 | 0 | 0 | 39 | 1 |
| Celtic | 2008–09 | Scottish Premier League | 25 | 3 | 1 | 0 | 3 | 0 | 4 | 0 | 0 | 0 | 33 | 3 |
| Celtic | Total | | 62 | 3 | 7 | 0 | 4 | 0 | 13 | 1 | 0 | 0 | 86 | 4 |
| Bristol City | 2009–10 | Championship | 40 | 5 | 2 | 0 | 0 | 0 | 0 | 0 | 0 | 0 | 42 | 5 |
| Aberdeen | 2010–11 | Scottish Premier League | 24 | 4 | 4 | 0 | 4 | 4 | 0 | 0 | 0 | 0 | 32 | 8 |
| Career total | | | 459 | 78 | 35 | 4 | 28 | 11 | 25 | 2 | 2 | 0 | 549 | 95 |

=== International ===
Appearances and goals by national team and year
| National team | Year | Apps | Goals |
|---|---|---|---|
| Scotland | 2005 | 7 | 1 |
| Scotland | 2006 | 4 | 0 |
| Scotland | 2007 | 6 | 0 |
| Scotland | 2008 | 5 | 0 |
| Scotland | 2009 | 2 | 0 |
| Scotland | 2010 | 1 | 0 |
| Total | | 25 | 1 |

Score and result list Scotland's goal tally first, score column indicates score after Hartley goal.

International goal scored by Paul Hartley
| No. | Date | Venue | Opponent | Score | Result | Competition |
|---|---|---|---|---|---|---|
| 1 | 12 October 2005 | Celje, Slovenia | Slovenia | 3–0 | 3–0 | FIFA World Cup 2006 qualification |

=== Managerial record ===
As of match played 14 November 2026

| Team | From | To | Record | | | | |
| Team | From | To | G | W | D | L | Win % |
|---|---|---|---|---|---|---|---|
| Alloa Athletic | 17 May 2011 | 18 January 2014 | 109 | 56 | 23 | 30 | 51.38 |
| Dundee | 3 February 2014 | 17 April 2017 | 138 | 46 | 37 | 55 | 33.33 |
| Falkirk | 9 October 2017 | 27 August 2018 | 40 | 16 | 8 | 16 | 40.00 |
| Cove Rangers | 3 July 2019 | 3 June 2022 | 112 | 63 | 23 | 26 | 56.25 |
| Hartlepool United | 3 June 2022 | 18 September 2022 | 11 | 1 | 4 | 6 | 9.09 |
| Cove Rangers | 5 January 2023 | present | 189 | 66 | 43 | 80 | 34.92 |
| Total | | | 599 | 248 | 138 | 213 | 41.40 |

== Honours ==
=== Player ===
Hibernian

- Scottish First Division: 1998–99

Heart of Midlothian

- Scottish Cup: 2005–06

Celtic

- Scottish Premier League: 2006–07, 2007–08
- Scottish Cup: 2006–07
- Scottish League Cup: 2008–09

Individual

- Heart of Midlothian Hall of Fame inductee: 2006

=== Manager ===
Alloa Athletic

- Scottish First Division play-offs: 2013
- Scottish Third Division: 2011–12

Dundee

- Scottish Championship: 2013–14

Cove Rangers

- Scottish League One: 2021–22
- Scottish League Two: 2019–20
