= Chris Kerr =

Chris Kerr may refer to:

- Chris Kerr (speedway rider) (born 1984), American speedway rider
- Chris Kerr (footballer) (born 1978), Scottish footballer
- Chris Kerr (referee) (born 1976), football referee from New Zealand
