= Russell Latapy =

Trinidadian footballer (born 1968)

Personal information
- Full name: Russell Nigel Latapy
- Date of birth: 2 August 1968 (age 58)
- Place of birth: Port of Spain, Trinidad
- Height: 1.70 m (5 ft 7 in)
- Position: Midfielder

Team information
- Current team: Trinidad and Tobago (assistant coach)

Senior career*
Years	Team	Apps	(Gls)
1987–1988	Trintoc		
1989–1990	Port Morant United		
1990–1994	Académica	127	(32)
1994–1996	Porto	40	(6)
1996–1998	Boavista	40	(1)
1998–2001	Hibernian	84	(22)
2001–2003	Rangers	23	(5)
2003	Dundee United	7	(0)
2003–2009	Falkirk	166	(24)
2009	Caledonia AIA	6	(2)
2011	Edinburgh City	0	(0)
Total		493	(92)

International career
1988–2009	Trinidad and Tobago	87	(29)

Managerial career
- 2007–2009: Falkirk (assistant)
- 2009: Trinidad and Tobago (assistant)
- 2009–2011: Trinidad and Tobago
- 2013–2014: Boavista (assistant)
- 2014–2015: Inverness CT (assistant)
- 2017: Trinidad and Tobago (assistant)
- 2019–2022: Barbados
- 2022–2023: Macarthur (assistant)
- 2024–: Trinidad and Tobago (assistant)
- * Club domestic league appearances and goals

Russell Nigel Latapy CM (born 2 August 1968) is a Trinidadian former professional footballer who played as an attacking midfielder, and is currently the assistant coach of Trinidad and Tobago national football team. In a senior career which spanned more than twenty years at both club and international level, he played in Portugal (eight years with three clubs, most notably Porto) and Scotland (eleven seasons representing four teams, Hibernian, Rangers, Dundee United and Falkirk).

Latapy gained 81 caps for the Trinidad and Tobago national team. As a member of the squad that competed at the 2006 FIFA World Cup in Germany, Latapy was awarded the Chaconia Medal (Gold Class), the second highest state decoration of Trinidad and Tobago.

== Early life ==
Born in Port of Spain, Latapy was first noticed playing organised football at under-10 level. As a youth he played in the Trinidad and Tobago Secondary School's Football League, and was called up to the national under-16 and under-19 teams.

When he was 19 years old, Latapy had an opportunity to attend Florida International University, but he chose to continue with his football career. This decision was supported by his mother despite the fact that in the 1980s very few Trinidadians were noted to have had careers in the sport that allowed them to earn a decent living.

== Club career ==
=== Portugal ===
In 1990, aged 22, after playing in his country and in Jamaica, Latapy moved to Portugal and signed for Académica de Coimbra, playing four years in the second division. During his spell in Coimbra, he appeared in nearly 150 official games, and scored eighteen goals in his last two seasons combined, but the club failed to win promotion. He also credited coach Vítor Manuel as one of the coaches he admired the most.

Latapy's performances with Académica saw him signed by FC Porto. Under Bobby Robson, he helped the club to back-to-back national championships, being used regularly in his second year (twenty-six games, five goals). Also, he earned the distinction of being the first Trinidadian to play in the UEFA Champions League.

In summer of 1996, Latapy signed with city neighbours Boavista FC. On 29 October, he scored twice in a 5–0 home win against FC Dinamo Tbilisi in that season's UEFA Europa League (5–1 on aggregate), and was also part of the squad that won the campaign's Portuguese Cup, even though he did not play in the final against S.L. Benfica (3–2).

=== Scotland ===
In the 1998 off-season, Latapy was recruited by manager Alex McLeish to join Scottish First Division side Hibernian. He quickly became a fan favourite at his new club and earned numerous team accolades, including two Player of the Year awards and a Scottish Division 1 Player of the Year award; he also contributed with six goals in twenty-three games in an eventual promotion to the Premier League, as champions.

Despite his contributions, Latapy was sacked from Hibernian early in 2001 after a night that began with him socialising with countryman and Manchester United player Dwight Yorke, and ended with him being charged by police for drunk driving. The incident represented a breach of the code of conduct for Hibernian players, who were forbidden to drink for 48 hours before a match. It was around this time that both players quit international football after being dropped from the starting line-up by national coach Renê Simões, after they failed to show up for a training session. Despite this, he was still shortlisted for SPFA Player of the Year in 2001.

Following his dismissal from Hibernian, Latapy was signed by Rangers, who were managed by Dick Advocaat. He failed to reproduce his best form at Ibrox Stadium, even when McLeish replaced the Dutchman at the helm of the club – the new manager expressed a desire to field younger players, Latapy was 34; in addition to his age, his partying tendencies also did little to put him in favour with the coach, and he eventually left in January 2003.

Latapy finished the 2002–03 season with fellow league team Dundee United. In the summer, he was brought to Falkirk by manager John Hughes, his former teammate at Hibs, who had 'tracked him down' in Portugal. The veteran started strongly, scoring a total of fourteen league goals in his first two seasons, and was an essential component of the team as they returned to the top flight in 2005, as champions. In the process, he was awarded the First Division 'Player of the Month' for April and was again named the league's Player of the Year.

Latapy received another individual award in 2006, this time the SPL 'Player of the Month' for August. The Bairns once again retained their top division status in 2008–09, but he only appeared in three games, leaving the club in January 2009 at nearly 41 after 194 competitive appearances (29 goals), and signed with Caledonia AIA in his homeland. Latapy was inducted into the 'Falkirk Hall of Fame' on 29 November 2008. To mark this occasion the club hosted a 'Russell Latapy Day'. In October 2011, at 43, he came out of retirement to sign for East of Scotland Football League's Edinburgh City, ahead of their Scottish Cup tie against Irvine Meadow.

== International career ==
Latapy's debut for Trinidad and Tobago was on 30 October 1988, in a 0–0 home draw against Honduras for the 1990 FIFA World Cup qualifiers. He was part of the squad known as the Strike Squad whom, needing only one point in its last game to qualify for the finals in Italy, was defeated 1–0 at home by the United States.

In 2005, after four years without one single appearance, Latapy returned to the national team following the intervention of his friend Yorke – who had done the same the previous year – and FIFA vice-president Austin "Jack" Warner. His first match in his second spell was a 3–2 home win over Guatemala in which he scored, and he took part in a further five contests in the 2006 World Cup qualifying campaign, including both games in the decisive playoffs against Bahrain, with the Soca Warriors qualifying to the FIFA World Cup for the first time in its history.

Latapy's input in the finals in Germany consisted of 25 minutes in the 2–0 loss against Paraguay, in an eventual group stage exit. The national team returned to a hero's welcome at Piarco International Airport in Trinidad and, in recognition of their achievements, each member of the team was awarded Trinidad and Tobago's second highest honour, the Chaconia Medal in gold, and TT$1,000,000 (roughly US$160,000 at the time).

== Coaching career ==
=== Trinidad & Tobago ===
Latapy became assistant to Trinidad and Tobago manager Francisco Maturana and, following the Colombian's resignation in April 2009, was appointed his successor. In his first game on 6 June, the team lost 3–2 at home to Costa Rica in 2010 FIFA World Cup qualifying, thereby falling to last in the group.

On 13 January 2011, it was confirmed by the Trinidad and Tobago Football Association that Latapy would cease his duties as national manager, as the team failed to qualify to the 2011 CONCACAF Gold Cup after being eliminated before the semi-final stage of the 2010 Caribbean Cup. In his 23 games in charge, he recorded nine wins, three draws and eleven losses.

=== Assistant ===
In January 2014, Latapy was working as an assistant coach for former club Boavista. He then linked up again with John Hughes, becoming his assistant at Inverness Caledonian Thistle.

Latapy helped Inverness win the 2014–15 Scottish Cup. He left the club in July 2015, as he sought to become a manager in his own right.

On 2 January 2017, Latapy became an assistant coach of the Soca Warriors where he worked along with its head coach Tom Saintfiet at the Hasely Crawford Stadium.

=== Barbados ===
On 1 April 2019, Latapy became manager of the Barbados national team on a two-year contract. His team won promotion from the 2019–20 CONCACAF Nations League C on goal difference after a 3–0 final-day win over the Cayman Islands, but fell 8–1 to Bermuda in the ensuing 2021 CONCACAF Gold Cup qualification first round. He left in June 2022.

== Career statistics ==
=== Club ===
Appearances and goals by club, season and competition
Club	Season	League			National Cup		League Cup		Continental		Other		Total	
Club	Season	Division	Apps	Goals	Apps	Goals	Apps	Goals	Apps	Goals	Apps	Goals	Apps	Goals
Hibernian	1998–99	Scottish First Division	23	6	2	1	0	0	–		–		25	7
Hibernian	1999–2000	Scottish Premier League	28	9	4	3	2	0	–		–		34	12
Hibernian	2000–01	Scottish Premier League	33	7	4	0	2	3	–		–		39	10
Hibernian	Total		84	22	10	4	4	3	0	0	0	0	98	29
Rangers	2001–02	Scottish Premier League	16	5	3	0	3	0	7	0	–		29	5
Rangers	2002–03	Scottish Premier League	7	0	0	0	0	0	1	0	–		8	0
Rangers	Total		23	5	3	0	3	0	8	0	0	0	37	5
Dundee United	2002–03	Scottish Premier League	7	0	0	0	0	0	–		–		7	0
Falkirk	2003–04	Scottish First Division	32	7	2	0	2	1	–		–		36	8
Falkirk	2004–05	Scottish First Division	32	7	1	0	8	4	–		–		41	11
Falkirk	2005–06	Scottish Premier League	30	2	3	0	2	0	–		–		35	2
Falkirk	2006–07	Scottish Premier League	37	6	2	0	3	0	–		–		42	6
Falkirk	2007–08	Scottish Premier League	32	2	1	0	2	0	–		–		35	2
Falkirk	2008–09	Scottish Premier League	3	0	0	0	1	0	–		–		4	0
Falkirk	Total		166	24	9	0	18	5	0	0	0	0	193	29
Career total			280	51	22	4	25	8	8	0	0	0	335	63

=== International goals ===
Scores and results list Trinidad and Tobago's goal tally first, score column indicates score after each Latapy goal.

List of international goals scored by Russell Latapy
No.	Date	Venue	Opponent	Score	Result	Competition
1	23 May 1991	Independence Park, Kingston, Jamaica	Dominican Republic	4–0	7–0	1991 Caribbean Cup
2	23 May 1991	Independence Park, Kingston, Jamaica	Dominican Republic	7–0	7–0	1991 Caribbean Cup
3	25 May 1991	Independence Park, Kingston, Jamaica	Martinique	1–0	1–0	1991 Caribbean Cup
4	30 May 1991	Independence Stadium, Kingston, Jamaica	Guyana	1–0	3–1	1991 Caribbean Cup
5	30 May 1991	Independence Stadium, Kingston, Jamaica	Guyana	3–1	3–1	1991 Caribbean Cup
6	19 April 1992	Hadely Court Stadium, Bridgetown, Barbados	Barbados	1–0	2–1	1994 FIFA World Cup qualification
7	21 June 1992	Hasely Crawford Stadium, Port of Spain, Trinidad and Tobago	Antigua and Barbuda	3–0	7–0	1992 Caribbean Cup
8	21 June 1992	Hasely Crawford Stadium, Port of Spain, Trinidad and Tobago	Antigua and Barbuda	5–0	7–0	1992 Caribbean Cup
9	27 June 1992	Hasely Crawford Stadium, Port of Spain, Trinidad and Tobago	Jamaica	2–0	3–1	1992 Caribbean Cup
10	21 June 1992	Hasely Crawford Stadium, Port of Spain, Trinidad and Tobago	Norway	1–2	3–2	Friendly
11	21 June 1992	Hasely Crawford Stadium, Port of Spain, Trinidad and Tobago	Norway	2–2	3–2	Friendly
12	21 June 1992	Hasely Crawford Stadium, Port of Spain, Trinidad and Tobago	Norway	3–2	3–2	Friendly
13	10 January 1996	Anaheim Stadium, Anaheim, United States	El Salvador	1–2	2–3	1996 CONCACAF Gold Cup
14	10 January 1996	Anaheim Stadium, Anaheim, United States	El Salvador	2–2	2–3	1996 CONCACAF Gold Cup
15	24 May 1996	Hasely Crawford Stadium, Port of Spain, Trinidad and Tobago	Jamaica	1–0	1–0	1996 Caribbean Cup
16	26 May 1996	Industry Park, Palo Seco, Trinidad and Tobago	Suriname	1–0	3–0	1996 Caribbean Cup
17	26 May 1996	Industry Park, Palo Seco, Trinidad and Tobago	Suriname	2–0	3–0	1996 Caribbean Cup
18	28 May 1996	Hasely Crawford Stadium, Port of Spain, Trinidad and Tobago	Saint Kitts and Nevis	1–0	3–2	1996 Caribbean Cup
19	28 May 1996	Hasely Crawford Stadium, Port of Spain, Trinidad and Tobago	Saint Kitts and Nevis	2–0	3–2	1996 Caribbean Cup
20	28 May 1996	Hasely Crawford Stadium, Port of Spain, Trinidad and Tobago	Saint Kitts and Nevis	4–1	3–2	1996 Caribbean Cup
21	15 June 1996	Estadio Olímpico Félix Sánchez, Santo Domingo, Dominican Republic	Dominican Republic	1–0	4–1	1998 FIFA World Cup qualification
22	15 June 1996	Estadio Olímpico Félix Sánchez, Santo Domingo, Dominican Republic	Dominican Republic	3–1	4–1	1998 FIFA World Cup qualification
23	23 June 1996	Hasely Crawford Stadium, Port of Spain, Trinidad and Tobago	Dominican Republic	8–0	8–0	1998 FIFA World Cup qualification
24	15 February 2000	Los Angeles Memorial Coliseum, Los Angeles, United States	Guatemala	1–0	4–2	2000 CONCACAF Gold Cup
25	23 July 2000	Hasely Crawford Stadium, Port of Spain, Trinidad and Tobago	Mexico	1–0	1–0	2002 FIFA World Cup qualification
26	3 September 2000	Queen's Park Oval, Port of Spain, Trinidad and Tobago	Canada	1–0	4–0	2002 FIFA World Cup qualification
27	16 June 2001	Hasely Crawford Stadium, Port of Spain, Trinidad and Tobago	Honduras	1–3	2–4	2002 FIFA World Cup qualification
28	3 September 2005	Hasely Crawford Stadium, Port of Spain, Trinidad and Tobago	Guatemala	1–1	3–2	2006 FIFA World Cup qualification
29	15 October 2008	Hasely Crawford Stadium, Port of Spain, Trinidad and Tobago	United States	1–0	2–1	2010 FIFA World Cup qualification

== Managerial statistics ==
As of match played 12 June 2022

Team	From	To	Record								Ref
Team	From	To	G	W	D	L	GF	GA	GD	Win %	Ref
Trinidad and Tobago	April 2009	April 2011	23	9	3	11	33	35	−2	39.13	
Barbados	April 2019	June 2022	20	5	2	13	21	45	−24	25.00	
Career total			43	14	5	24	54	80	−26	32.56	

== Honours ==
Porto

- Primeira Liga: 1994–95, 1995–96
- Supertaça Cândido de Oliveira: 1994

Boavista

- Taça de Portugal: 1996–97
- Supertaça Cândido de Oliveira: 1997

Hibernian

- Scottish First Division: 1998–99

Rangers

- Scottish League Cup: 2001–02

Falkirk

- Scottish First Division: 2004–05
- Scottish Challenge Cup: 2004–05

Trinidad and Tobago

- Caribbean Cup: 1992, 1996

Individual

- T&T Footballer of the Year in 1989, 1996
- Scottish Premier League: Player of the Month August 2006
- Scottish First Division: Player of the Year 1998–99, 2004–05
- Scottish First Division: Player of the Month April 2005
- Hibernian Player of the Year in 1998–99, 1999–2000
- T&T Chaconia Medal Gold (World Cup qualifying squad) in 1989
- T&T Chaconia Medal Gold (World Cup Finals squad) in 2006
- T&T Hummingbird Medal Gold (for Sport) in 1996
- Edinburgh Evening News Sports Personality of the Year in 1999
- T&T Olympic Committee Sports Personality of the Year in 2000P
- Nominated for the BBC Scotland's Off The Ball Overseas Player of the Year in 2004
- Best XI 2000 CONCACAF Gold Cup
