= Kenny Miller =

Scottish footballer (born 1979)

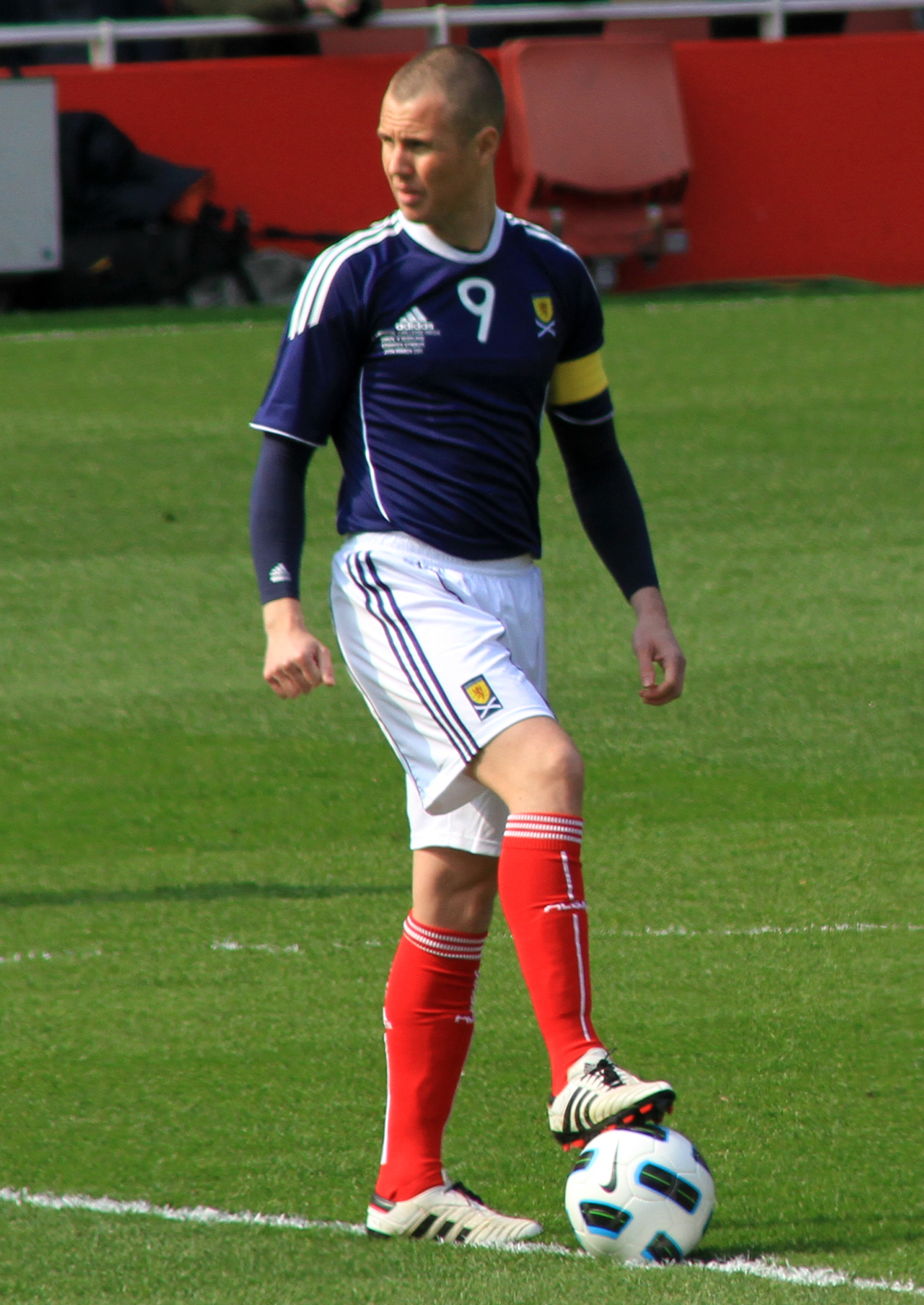
- Miller in 2011

Personal information
- Full name: Kenneth Miller
- Date of birth: 23 December 1979 (age 46)
- Place of birth: Edinburgh, Scotland
- Height: 5 ft 10 in (1.78 m)
- Position: Striker

Team information
- Current team: Maccabi Tel Aviv (manager)

Youth career
- 1988–1996: Hutchison Vale
- 1996–1997: Hibernian

Senior career*
Years	Team	Apps	(Gls)
1997–2000	Hibernian	45	(12)
1998–1999	→ Stenhousemuir (loan)	11	(8)
2000–2001	Rangers	30	(8)
2001	→ Wolverhampton Wanderers (loan)	5	(2)
2001–2006	Wolverhampton Wanderers	164	(50)
2006–2007	Celtic	33	(11)
2007–2008	Derby County	30	(4)
2008–2011	Rangers	81	(49)
2011	Bursaspor	15	(5)
2011–2012	Cardiff City	43	(10)
2012–2014	Vancouver Whitecaps FC	43	(13)
2014–2018	Rangers	114	(35)
2018	Livingston	2	(0)
2018–2019	Dundee	33	(8)
2019–2020	Partick Thistle	21	(5)
Total		670	(227)

International career
2000–2001	Scotland U21	7	(2)
2003	Scotland B	1	(0)
2001–2013	Scotland	69	(18)

Managerial career
- 2018: Livingston
- 2022: Falkirk (caretaker)
- 2026–: Maccabi Tel Aviv
- * Club domestic league appearances and goals

Kenneth Miller (born 23 December 1979) is a Scottish professional football coach and former player, who is currently the head coach of Israeli Premier League club Maccabi Tel Aviv. Miller, who played as a striker, is one of only five post-war players to have played for both Rangers and Celtic.

Miller began his career at Hibernian before moving on to Rangers then to the English side Wolverhampton Wanderers, where he won his first career honour, the 2003 First Division play-off final. After five seasons with Wolverhampton, Miller returned to Scotland, signing for the other side of the Old Firm – Celtic. He finished his only full season at Celtic with SPL and Scottish Cup winners medals.

After one season with Derby County, he returned to Scotland and to Rangers, winning back-to-back SPL titles, the Scottish Cup and the Scottish League Cup in his two full seasons. He moved to Turkish club Bursaspor in January 2011, but returned to the UK later that year, signing for Cardiff City. After one season with Cardiff, Miller played in Major League Soccer for Vancouver Whitecaps FC. He had a third spell with Rangers between 2014 and 2018. After a very brief spell as player/manager of Livingston, Miller played for Dundee and Partick Thistle.

Miller was a regular Scotland international player from his debut in 2001 until his retirement in 2013. He scored 18 goals in 69 appearances.

Miller was assistant coach of the Newcastle Jets and Western Sydney Wanderers, Falkirk, Huddersfield Town and Atlanta United. He was caretaker manager of Falkirk in 2022. As manager of Maccabi Tel Aviv, he won the Israel State Cup in 2025–26.

== Club career ==
=== Hibernian ===
Miller grew up in Musselburgh and got his big break when he signed for local side Hibernian; he made his debut against Motherwell in the 1997–98 season. A loan spell at Stenhousemuir saw Miller score five doubles—10 goals—in 13 league and Scottish Cup games, before he returned to Hibernian to establish himself as a regular player. Highlights of his four years at the club included being the club's top scorer in season 1999–2000 and receiving the Scottish PFA Young Player of the Year award in 2000.

=== Rangers (first spell) ===
Miller signed for Rangers at a cost of £2 million on 26 June 2000, signing a five-year contract. He made his debut in a 4–1 win over FBK Kaunas on 26 July during a Champions League qualifier. His first goal came on 5 August 2000 during a league match away to Kilmarnock, scoring the third in a 4–2 win.

Three months later, Miller netted five goals (a Scottish Premier League record) during a 7–1 win against St Mirren. More goals followed against AS Monaco and Aberdeen and helped him to a tally of ten goals from just fourteen games, all coming before the turn of the year. Chances became limited thereafter and, as the season came to a close, he netted only once more against Brechin City in a Scottish Cup match on 27 January 2001. This proved to be his final strike that season. Miller had made a total of 38 appearances and scored 11 goals for Rangers.

=== Wolverhampton Wanderers ===
In September 2001, Miller went to Wolverhampton Wanderers on a three-month loan, scoring against Gillingham and Walsall. However, after just five appearances, Miller broke his collarbone in a fall. In December 2001, Wolves secured him on a permanent transfer at a cost of £3 million, on a four-and-a-half-year deal.

In 2002–03 Miller found himself back in the Wolves starting 11, but he had only managed six goals in 19 starts. However, during the final six months of the season he scored 18 goals in his final 24 appearances of that campaign, including in the play-off final that saw the club win promotion.

In the 2003–04 season, Miller started off in the physiotherapy room; it was not until October that he made his first Premier League start. He played in a 4–5–1 formation for the following few months, situated in a right-wing role. This led to frustration on Miller's part, and his only goals up until January came in the League Cup, against Burnley, and a double against Kidderminster Harriers in the FA Cup on 13 January. The following Saturday, Wolves beat Manchester United 1–0 with Miller scoring the winner in the 65th minute. Miller then grabbed a last minute equaliser against Liverpool the following Wednesday. Despite starting many games from then on in a striker's role, those were Miller's only Premier League goals and Wolves were relegated at the end of the season.

In the summer of 2004, Miller handed in a transfer request over lack of first team opportunities. Despite having a tense relationship with the Wolves manager, Dave Jones, he started the 2004–05 season in good form for the club scoring seven goals in his first 10 games at Wolves. The appointment of Glenn Hoddle signalled a new start for Miller, and he formed a successful partnership with Carl Cort, ending the 2004–05 season with 20 goals.

In summer 2005, his form attracted the attention of the newly promoted Premier League team Sunderland, but Wolves rejected their £1m and £1.2m offers and Miller began the new season as a Wolves player. He was subject of further transfer bid in the January transfer window, however Wolves rejected a £1.5m offer for Miller from Sheffield United after the player stated he was not interested in the move. Despite only playing in his natural position on few occasions, Miller still ended the season as top scorer, with 12 goals – the third time in Wolves' last three Championship campaigns. Miller played 191 games and scored 63 goals during his five years with the club.

=== Celtic ===
When Miller's contract expired at the end of that season, he transferred to Celtic for free under the Bosman ruling. He signed a pre-contract agreement in January after refusing to sign a new deal at Wolves a month earlier. Miller became only the third player since World War II to have played for both sides of the Old Firm – following Alfie Conn and Maurice Johnston. (Note: Steven Pressley and Mark Brown have since played for both Rangers and Celtic.)

Miller was handed the number nine jersey upon his arrival at Celtic. He endured a difficult start at the club, getting sent off in a pre-season friendly with D.C. United and failing to score in his first nine games. He finally netted his first goal, against Old Firm rivals and former employers Rangers at Celtic Park in September 2006. He proceeded to score in Celtic's 1–0 Champions League win against Copenhagen from the penalty spot and netted two in the 3–0 win over Benfica. By scoring in the 2006–07 competition, Miller became the first player to score goals in the Champions League proper for both Rangers and Celtic. However, he ended the season with only four league goals. He did play in the Scottish Cup final, before being substituted because of an injury. Despite hints from the player himself that he would leave to get more first-team opportunities, Miller vowed to stay at the club and fight for his place in the team. Miller scored his first goal in his first appearance of the 2007–08 season in a 4–1 victory over Falkirk and added to his collection the following week with a brace against Aberdeen. He netted 11 goals in total for the club in 46 appearances.

=== Derby County ===
Miller signed a three-year deal with newly promoted Premier League club Derby County on 31 August 2007 for an undisclosed fee, later confirmed by Derby County manager Paul Jewell to be close to £2.25m. Miller started well at his new club, scoring in his first two home matches, including the winner on his league debut for the Rams against Newcastle United in a 1–0 win on 17 September, a strike which won the club's Goal of the Season award. However, following this initial success Miller netted just twice in his next 28 league fixtures. After less than seven months at the club and with Derby looking likely candidates for relegation, Miller expressed a desire to move – return to Rangers being a possible destination, although manager Jewell insisted any move would have to be financially fair for Derby.

=== Rangers (second spell) ===
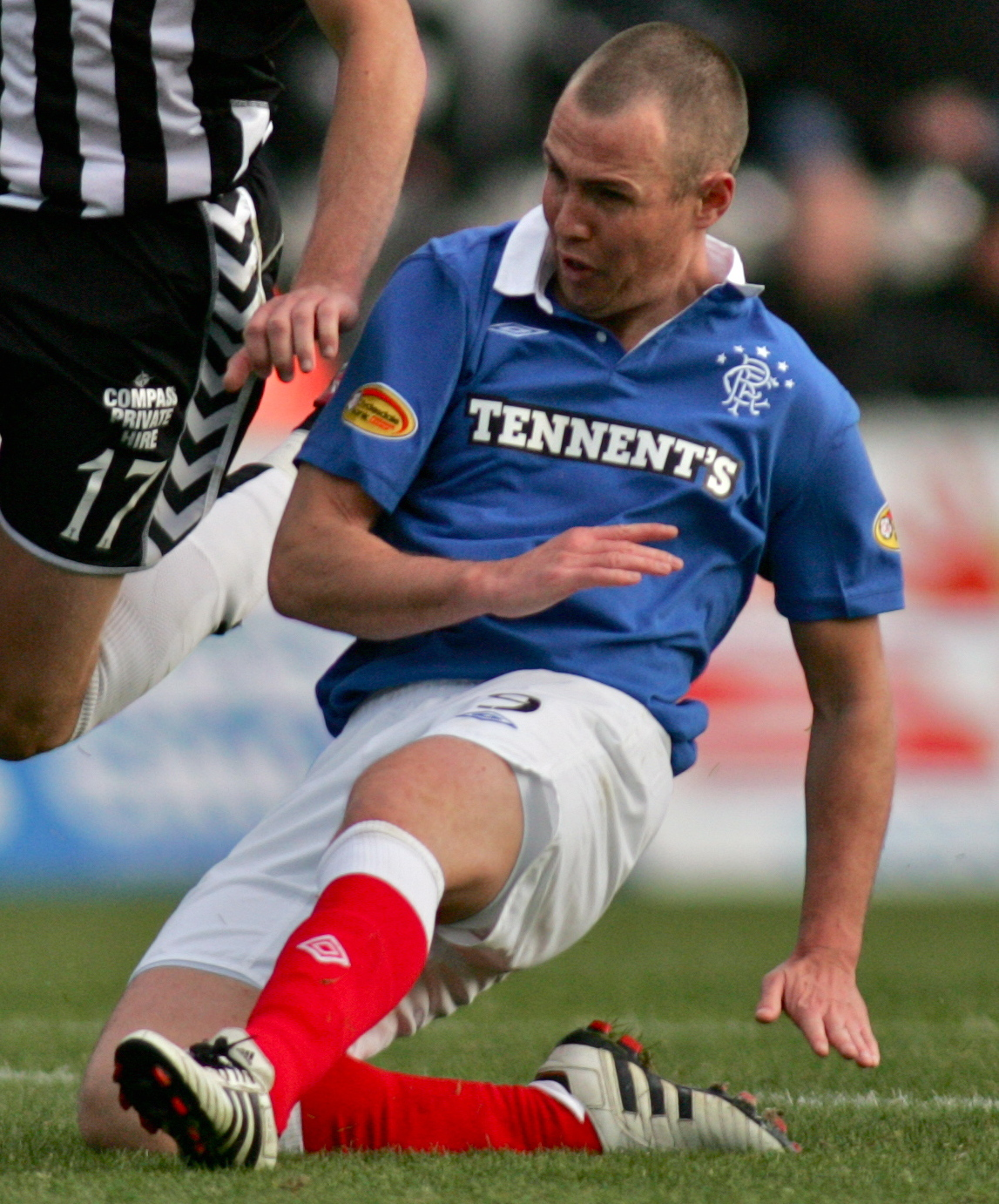
Miller going in for a slide tackle against St Mirren in 2010

A fee of £2 million was agreed between Rangers and Derby allowing Miller to enter into discussions about a transfer back to Ibrox on 10 June 2008. The deal was completed on 13 June. Miller's return means he is the only player in the modern era to cross the Old Firm divide twice, and only the second in history, the first being Tom Dunbar in the 1890s.

Miller made his second debut for the club on 30 July 2008 in a Champions League qualifier against FBK Kaunas, who he played during his first Rangers debut. He netted a brace in the first Old Firm game of the season on 31 August 2008. He followed this up with a further two goals against former employers Hibernian at Easter Road a month later. Miller played in the League Cup Final in March 2009 but Rangers lost the match 2–0 to Celtic after extra time. However, he won a league winners medal with Rangers on the final day of the season and followed it up with a Scottish Cup winners medal.

Miller had an injury-ridden start to the 2009–10 season, but gave a Man of the Match performance in the first Old Firm game of the season, scoring both of Rangers' goals in a 2–1 win. In March 2010, he scored the winning goal in the League Cup Final against St Mirren, after Rangers had been reduced to nine men.

Miller was handed the number 9 shirt after Kris Boyd moved to Middlesbrough. He scored his second Rangers hat-trick against former club Hibernian on 22 August 2010; his first was when he scored five against St Mirren in November 2000. Miller claimed to be in "the form of his career" after notching up ten goals in the first six league matches of the 2010–11 season. Miller scored twice in the first Old Firm derby of the season.

Miller had scored 22 goals by early January, when Rangers accepted an offer of £700,000 from Birmingham City. A lower offer by Turkish club Bursaspor was later agreed, however. Miller had scored for Rangers against Bursaspor earlier that season in the Champions League. Despite leaving Rangers during the middle of the season, he finished the season as top goalscorer in the SPL.

=== Bursaspor ===
On 21 January 2011, Miller officially signed for Bursaspor for £400,000 on a two-and-a-half-year contract. He made his debut for the Turkish side two days later in a goalless draw with Konyaspor when he played the last 25 minutes after replacing Pablo Batalla. Kenny scored on his first start for Bursaspor in a 2–0 win over Galatasaray. He followed this up with a further two goals in his next game against Sivasspor, netting an 88th-minute winner. Miller scored five goals in 15 appearances for the club.

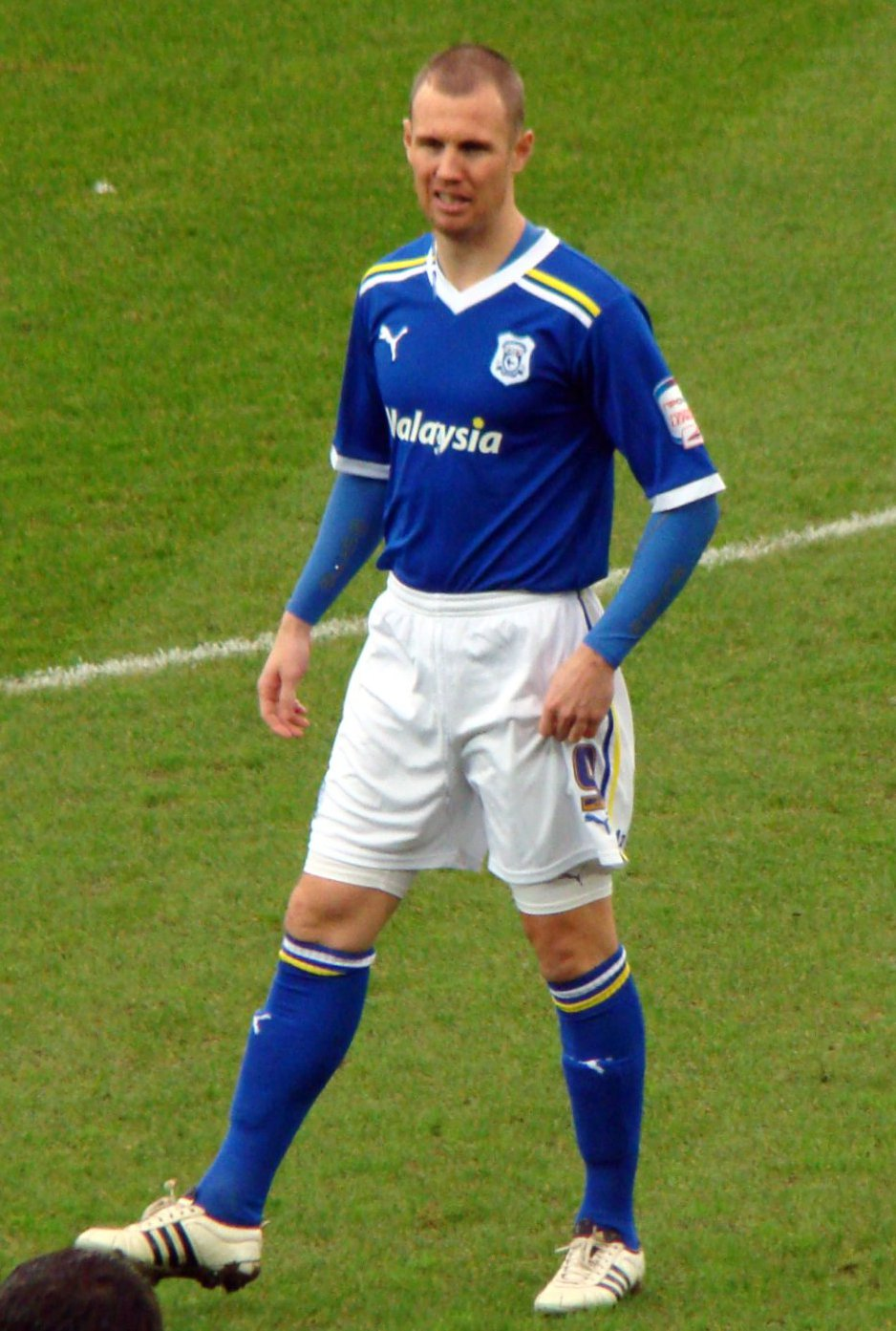
Miller playing for Cardiff

Miller failed to settle in Turkey, however, and he asked Bursaspor to consider selling him. Bursaspor then accepted an offer from Cardiff City. Rangers also made an offer for Miller, but this was rejected by Bursaspor.

=== Cardiff City ===
Miller signed for Cardiff City on 26 July 2011, for a reported transfer fee of £870,000. Miller scored his first goal in the 91st minute of his debut match against West Ham United in the season opener. Miller returned to the score sheet, on 28 September, with a brace in a 2–1 win over Southampton. However, Miller suffered a groin injury in 10 minutes the following game against Hull City, which kept him out of two Scotland games and two Championship matches, where Cardiff only gained a point. On 19 October, manager Malky Mackay confirmed that Miller was fit and ready to make a return against Barnsley. Miller did return this match and scored the opener, but only lasted 30 minutes in the match after suffering a head injury. Miller scored in 1–0 victories against Birmingham City and Nottingham Forest in December. Cardiff reached the 2012 Football League Cup Final, but Miller missed a chance to score late in extra time. He then missed his penalty kick as Cardiff lost to Liverpool in a penalty shootout. He struggled for form later in the 2011–12 season, scoring only once in 22 appearances.

=== Vancouver Whitecaps FC ===
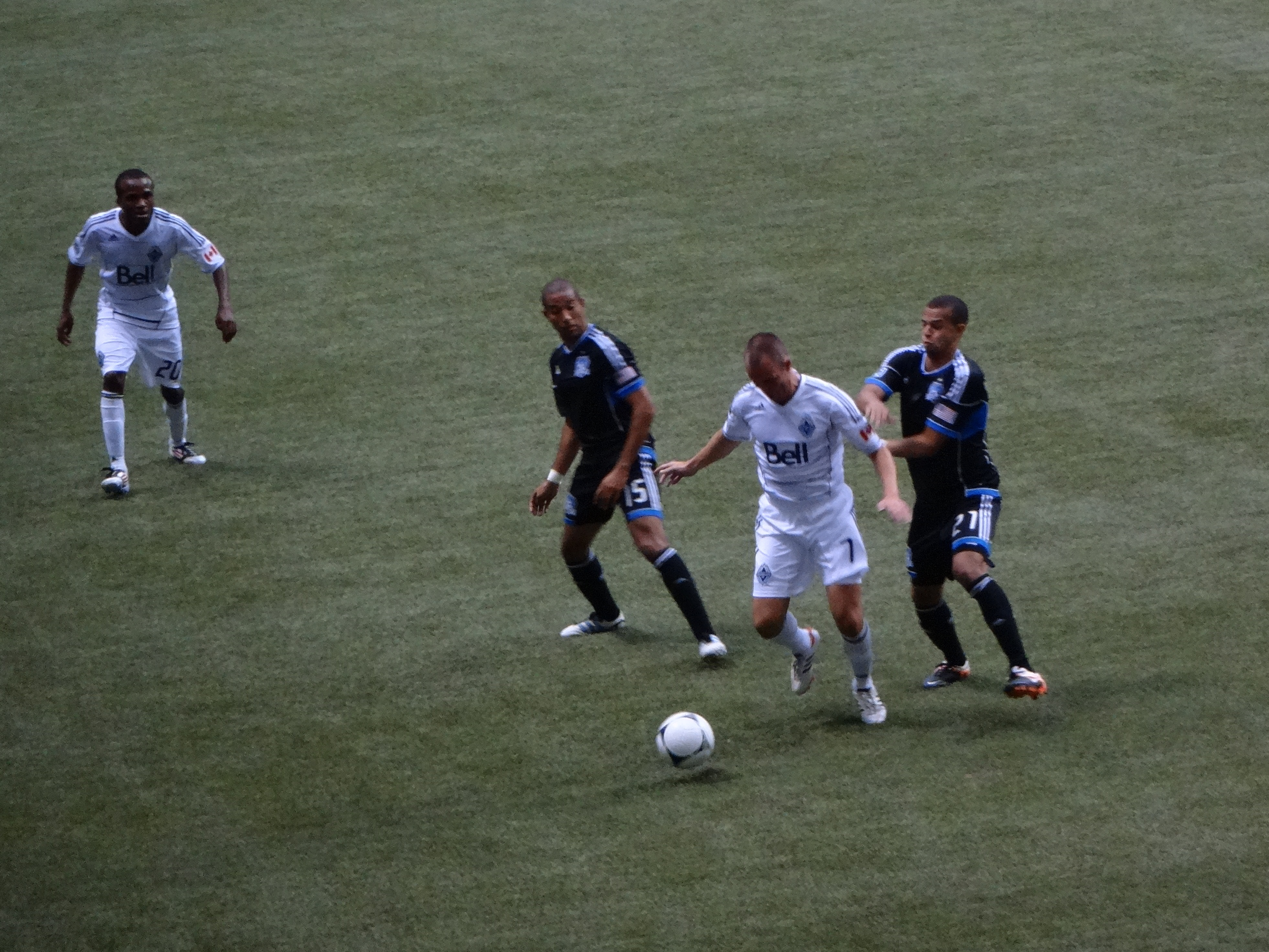
Miller in his debut against the San Jose Earthquakes on 22 July 2012

Miller signed with Vancouver Whitecaps FC of Major League Soccer on 16 July 2012. Six days later, he made his debut in a 2–1 home win over the San Jose Earthquakes, playing the last 12 minutes in place of Darren Mattocks. He scored his first goal for the Whitecaps on 25 August 2012 against the Portland Timbers in a 2–1 loss. He signed an extension in July 2013 to take him through June 2014 with the club, however, the two sides mutually agreed to terminate the remaining two months in his contract on 4 May 2014.

=== Rangers (third spell) ===
On 4 June 2014, Miller signed for Rangers on a one-year deal. He made his third debut against Hibernian in a Challenge Cup tie on 5 August and scored his first goal since his return to the club on 30 August against Queen of the South. Miller scored nine times in 41 appearances in 2014–15, as Rangers failed to win promotion to the top flight.

Miller signed another one-year extension with Rangers in November 2015. On 2 January 2016, Miller became Rangers' oldest ever player to score a hat-trick in a 6–0 win over Dumbarton. Five goals in four league games during January 2016 saw Miller win the Scottish Championship player of the month award. He played and scored in the 2016 Scottish Challenge Cup Final, as Rangers beat Peterhead 4–0, only five days after Rangers had secured the Scottish Championship trophy. Miller ended the 2015–16 season with 21 goals, scoring his final goal in the 2016 Scottish Cup Final which Rangers lost 3–2 to Hibernian, giving Hibernian their first Scottish Cup win since the 1901–02 Scottish Cup.

During the 2016–17 season, Miller scored his 100th goal for Rangers, over three spells, in a Scottish Premiership match against Inverness Caledonian Thistle. It was strike which was nominated for the SPFL's and the club's goal of the month awards for October, winning the latter. He also scored his tenth career goal in an Old Firm derby (nine of them for Rangers) when he captained the side in a 2–1 home defeat to Celtic on Hogmanay 2016. He also scored the only goal for Rangers in a 5–1 defeat to Celtic, the heaviest defeat at Ibrox since 1897. Miller scored his first goals of 2017 with a late brace in a 2–1 Scottish Cup win at home to Motherwell on 21 January and followed this a week later by netting the opening goal in a league match, also against Motherwell. On 28 April, Miller signed an extension to his contract until 2018 with manager Pedro Caixinha stating he was impressed by Millers professionalism and leadership.

Miller scored the opening goal in Rangers' 2017–18 season against Progrès Niederkorn in the Europa League on 29 June 2017. Despite his goal, Rangers went on to lose 2–1 on aggregate, giving Progrès their first ever European win. Miller was dropped from the Rangers first team in September 2017. This came after Pedro Caixinha had criticised some of the team's Scottish players in a meeting after a 2–0 defeat by Celtic. Caixinha then suggested that a Rangers player had leaked team information to opponents, which led journalists to surmise that Miller had been the source. Caixinha was sacked in late October, and Miller was reinstated to the Rangers team by caretaker manager Graeme Murty; in his first game back, Miller scored two goals in a 3–1 win against Hearts.

In April 2018, Miller and teammate Lee Wallace were suspended by the club pending an internal investigation into an altercation with manager Murty, in the aftermath of the 2017–18 Scottish Cup semi-final which Rangers had lost 4–0 to Celtic. Miller was fined by Rangers and left the club at the end of his contract. Five months after the incident for which they were disciplined, Miller and Lee Wallace won an appeal at a SPFL tribunal against the action taken against them, with the expectation they would make a financial claim against Rangers for the fines imposed. Over his three spells at the club, he made 301 appearances in all competitions, scoring 116 goals.

=== Livingston player/manager ===
Miller was appointed player-manager of Scottish Premiership club Livingston in June 2018. He scored his first goal for the club on his third appearance, netting the only goal of a 1–0 victory over Dumbarton on 21 July in the group stage of the 2018–19 Scottish League Cup. He left the role on 19 August, with his departure being an 'amicable agreement' following discussions between Miller and the club hierarchy; they would have preferred him to give up playing and focus solely on the managerial role, which he was not prepared to do at that time. Livingston said that they had asked Miller to focus on his tasks as manager, but Miller had been unwilling to end his playing career. The following week, Miller's former Scotland teammate Gary Holt was appointed his successor at Livingston.

=== Dundee ===
Miller signed a two-year playing contract with Dundee on 29 August 2018. He failed to score in his first seven matches for the club but then scored five in three games, including a hat-trick at home to relegation rivals Hamilton Academical on 5 December. Dundee finished in bottom position in the Premiership table and were relegated to the Scottish Championship, with Miller leaving the club 'by mutual consent' during the summer off-season.

=== Partick Thistle ===
On 26 June 2019, Miller signed for Partick Thistle on a one-year contract. Miller scored his first goal for Thistle in the League Cup v Queen's Park in a 2–1 win. Miller was released from his Thistle contract in January 2020, having scored 10 goals in all competitions for the club. He announced his retirement from playing football soon afterwards.

== International career ==
Miller made his under-21 debut for Scotland in a 2–0 defeat to France at Rugby Park in March 2000. It was the first of a total of seven appearances at under-21 level, in which Miller registered two goals.

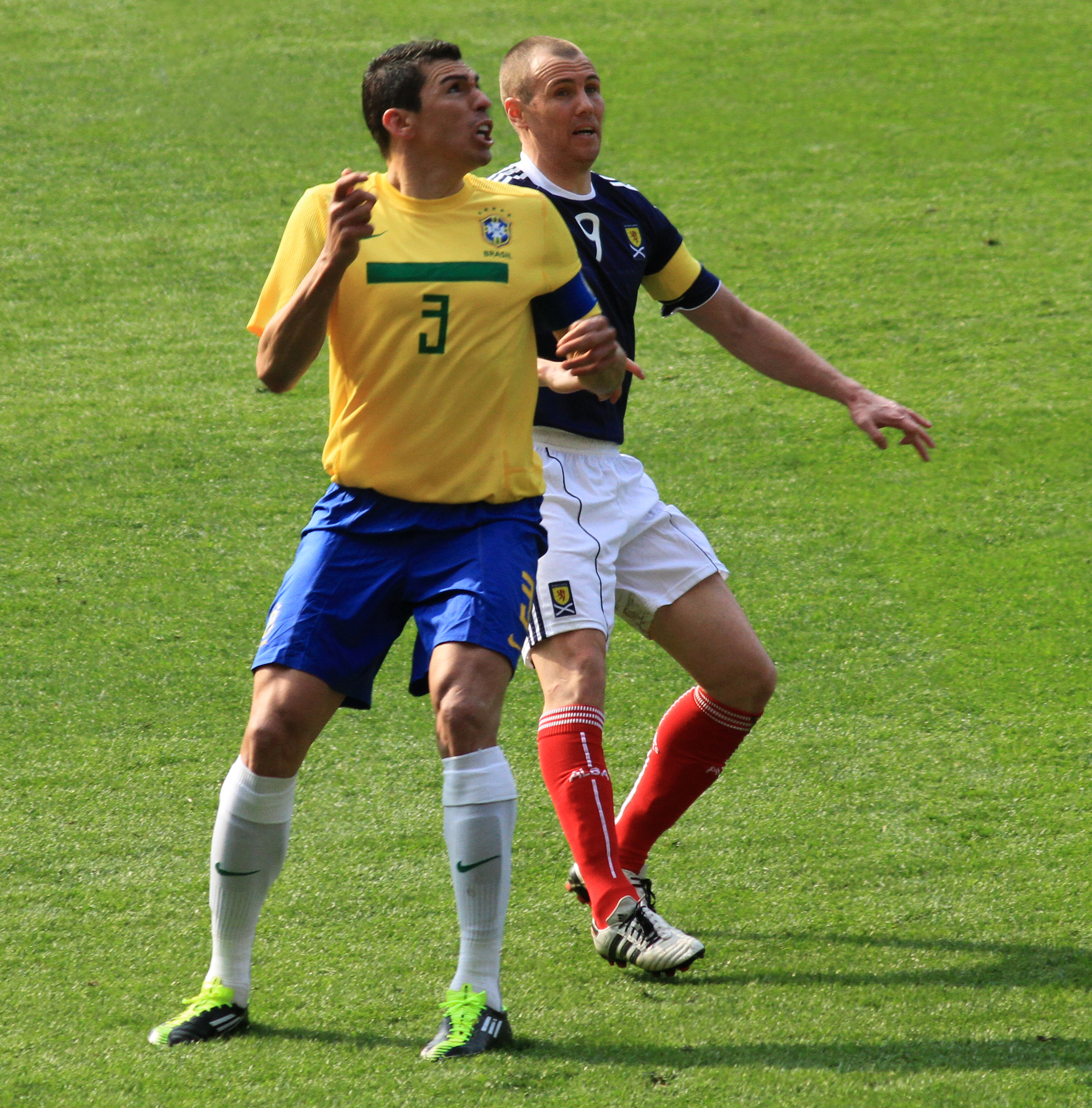
Miller (right) playing for Scotland against Lúcio of Brazil in March 2011

Miller made his international debut, under the management of Craig Brown, on 25 April 2001. He was an 80th-minute substitute for Scott Booth during a 1–1 friendly match against Poland. He had to wait nearly two years for his second appearance when he was selected for a Euro 2004 qualifier by the then manager Berti Vogts in March 2003. Miller started the match at home to Iceland and scored within the first ten minutes to give Scotland the lead.

From then until his international retirement in 2013, Miller was almost always first-choice, playing either on his own or as part of a two-man attack. He scored goals in important games against several teams, including Germany and Ukraine. In 2005, Miller scored four goals in three internationals, against Austria, Italy, and Norway.

Miller won his 50th cap for Scotland in a 1–0 defeat against Czech Republic in October 2010. He captained the team for the first time, and scored, against Northern Ireland on 9 February 2011. Miller continued to represent Scotland after moving to Major League Soccer club Vancouver Whitecaps FC. He scored in the 3–2 defeat against England in August 2013, which meant that Miller had scored 18 goals in 69 appearances for Scotland. Miller retired from international football soon after the England match, with Scotland manager Gordon Strachan stating that Miller wanted to prolong his club career.

== Coaching career ==
Upon signing a contract extension with Rangers in November 2016, Miller took up a part-time coaching role with their Under-20 team. After leaving Rangers in 2018, Miller had a short stint as player-manager of Livingston. He then continued his playing career with Dundee and Partick Thistle. Miller retired as a player in February 2020 and took a coaching role with Australian club Newcastle Jets. Following the departure of head coach Carl Robinson to Western Sydney Wanderers, Miller followed as his assistant. During his time at the Wanderers, Miller took charge for a 1-0 win in Ballarat when Robinson fell ill on the day of the game.

In December 2021, Miller was announced as the assistant head coach of Scottish League One side Falkirk alongside his former Vancouver Whitecaps manager, Martin Rennie. Miller became caretaker manager in April 2022 after Rennie left the club. He held this position until the end of the season, when John McGlynn was appointed as the new manager.

On 26 November 2022, Miller joined EFL Championship side Huddersfield Town as co-assistant coach under Mark Fotheringham. He and Fotheringham were sacked on 8 February 2023, following poor form.

On 10 January 2025, Miller joined Major League Soccer club Atlanta United as an assistant coach under Ronny Deila.

Miller joined Israeli Premier League club Maccabi Tel Aviv F.C. on 1 February 2026, again as Deila's assistant. In May, Deila took a leave of absence, and Miller became the interim head coach of Maccabi. Shortly after, he led them to victory in the Israeli State Cup final, winning his first trophy as a manager with a 2–1 victory against Hapoel Be'er Sheva. On 23 June, he became Maccabi's head coach on a permanent basis, signing a one-year deal with the club, with an option for one additional year.

== Career statistics ==
=== Club ===
Appearances and goals by club, season and competition
Club	Season	League			National cup (Note: Appearances in the Scottish Cup, FA Cup, and Canadian Championship)		League cup (Note: Appearances in the EFL Cup and Scottish League Cup)		Continental		Other		Total	
Club	Season	Division	Apps	Goals	Apps	Goals	Apps	Goals	Apps	Goals	Apps	Goals	Apps	Goals
Hibernian	1997–98	Scottish Premier Division	7	0	0	0	0	0	—		—		7	0
Hibernian	1998–99	Scottish First Division	7	1	0	0	1	0	—		—		8	1
Hibernian	1999–2000	Scottish Premier League	31	11	5	1	2	1	—		—		38	13
Hibernian	Total		45	12	5	1	3	1	0	0	0	0	53	14
Stenhousemuir (loan)	1998–99	Scottish Third Division	11	8	2	2	0	0	—		—		13	10
Rangers	2000–01	Scottish Premier League	27	8	3	1	1	1	4 (Note: Appearances in the UEFA Champions League and UEFA Cup.)	1	—		35	11
Rangers	2001–02	Scottish Premier League	3	0	0	0	0	0	0	0	—		3	0
Rangers	Total		30	8	3	1	1	1	4	1	0	0	38	11
Wolverhampton Wanderers	2001–02	First Division	22	2	1	0	0	0	—		2 (Note: Appearances in the Championship playoffs)	0	25	2
Wolverhampton Wanderers	2002–03	First Division	43	19	4	3	2	1	—		3	1	52	24
Wolverhampton Wanderers	2003–04	Premier League	25	2	3	2	2	1	—		—		30	5
Wolverhampton Wanderers	2004–05	Championship	44	19	2	0	1	1	—		—		47	20
Wolverhampton Wanderers	2005–06	Championship	35	10	2	0	2	2	—		—		39	12
Wolverhampton Wanderers	Total		169	52	12	5	7	5	0	0	5	1	193	63
Celtic	2006–07	Scottish Premier League	31	4	4	1	1	0	8 (Note: Appearances in the UEFA Champions League.)	3	—		44	8
Celtic	2007–08	Scottish Premier League	2	3	0	0	0	0	0	0	—		2	3
Celtic	Total		33	7	4	1	1	0	8	3	0	0	46	11
Derby County	2007–08	Premier League	30	4	3	2	0	0	—		—		33	6
Rangers	2008–09	Scottish Premier League	30	10	5	3	1	0	2	0	—		38	13
Rangers	2009–10	Scottish Premier League	33	18	6	2	1	1	5	0	—		45	21
Rangers	2010–11	Scottish Premier League	18	21	0	0	1	0	6	1	—		25	22
Rangers	Total		81	49	11	5	3	1	13	1	0	0	108	56
Bursaspor	2010–11	Süper Lig	15	5	0	0	—		0	0	0	0	15	5
Cardiff City	2011–12	Championship	43	10	0	0	5	1	—		2	0	50	11
Vancouver Whitecaps FC	2012	MLS	13	2	0	0	—		—		1 (Note: Appearance in the MLS Cup playoffs)	0	14	2
Vancouver Whitecaps FC	2013	MLS	21	8	1	0	—		—		—		22	8
Vancouver Whitecaps FC	2014	MLS	9	3	0	0	—		—		0	0	10	3
Vancouver Whitecaps FC	Total		43	13	1	0	0	0	0	0	1	0	45	13
Rangers	2014–15	Scottish Championship	27	7	3	0	2	0	—		10 (Note: Appearances in the Scottish Challenge Cup and Scottish Championship playoffs. Miller has been credited as making four appearances for Rangers in the Scottish Challenge Cup, however, only three appearances have been recorded by media sources, including the club's website and BBC)	2	42	9
Rangers	2015–16	Scottish Championship	32	14	6	2	2	1	—		3 (Note: Appearances in the Scottish Challenge Cup)	4	43	21
Rangers	2016–17	Scottish Premiership	37	11	4	3	6	0	—		—		47	14
Rangers	2017–18	Scottish Premiership	18	3	2	0	1	1	2	1	—		23	5
Rangers	Total		114	35	15	5	11	2	2	1	13	6	155	49
Livingston	2018–19	Scottish Premiership	2	0	0	0	5	1	—		—		7	1
Dundee	2018–19	Scottish Premiership	33	8	2	0	0	0	—		—		35	8
Partick Thistle	2019–20	Scottish Championship	21	5	2	0	6	3	—		3	2	32	10
Career total			670	216	60	22	42	15	27	6	24	9	823	268

=== International ===
Appearances and goals by national team and year
National team	Year	Apps	Goals
Scotland	2001	1	0
Scotland	2002	0	0
Scotland	2003	7	2
Scotland	2004	9	0
Scotland	2005	8	4
Scotland	2006	4	3
Scotland	2007	6	1
Scotland	2008	5	1
Scotland	2009	6	0
Scotland	2010	5	1
Scotland	2011	7	4
Scotland	2012	7	1
Scotland	2013	4	1
Total		69	18

Scores and results list Scotland's goal tally first, score column indicates score after each Miller goal.

List of international goals scored by Kenny Miller
No.	Date	Venue	Opponent	Score	Result	Competition
1	29 March 2003	Hampden Park, Glasgow, Scotland	Iceland	1–0	2–1	Euro 2004 qualification
2	7 June 2003	Hampden Park, Glasgow, Scotland	Germany	1–1	1–1	Euro 2004 qualification
3	17 August 2005	Arnold Schwarzenegger Stadion, Graz, Austria	Austria	1–0	2–2	Friendly
4	3 September 2005	Hampden Park, Glasgow, Scotland	Italy	1–0	1–1	2006 World Cup qualification
5	7 September 2005	Ullevaal Stadion, Oslo, Norway	Norway	1–0	2–1	2006 World Cup qualification
6	7 September 2005	Ullevaal Stadion, Oslo, Norway	Norway	2–0	2–1	2006 World Cup qualification
7	1 March 2006	Hampden Park, Glasgow, Scotland	Switzerland	1–2	1–3	Friendly
8	2 September 2006	Celtic Park, Glasgow, Scotland	Faroe Islands	4–0	6–0	Euro 2008 qualification
9	6 September 2006	Darius and Girėnas Stadium, Kaunas, Lithuania	Lithuania	2–0	2–1	Euro 2008 qualification
10	13 October 2007	Hampden Park, Glasgow, Scotland	Ukraine	1–0	3–1	Euro 2008 qualification
11	26 March 2008	Hampden Park, Glasgow, Scotland	Croatia	1–1	1–1	Friendly
12	7 September 2010	Hampden Park, Glasgow, Scotland	Liechtenstein	1–1	2–1	Euro 2012 qualification
13	9 February 2011	Aviva Stadium, Dublin, Ireland	Northern Ireland	1–0	3–0	2011 Nations Cup
14	25 May 2011	Aviva Stadium, Dublin, Ireland	Wales	2–1	3–1	2011 Nations Cup
15	3 September 2011	Hampden Park, Glasgow, Scotland	Czech Republic	1–0	2–2	Euro 2012 qualification
16	11 November 2011	Antonis Papadopoulos Stadium, Larnaca, Cyprus	Cyprus	1–0	2–1	Friendly
17	11 September 2012	Hampden Park, Glasgow, Scotland	Macedonia	1–1	1–1	2014 World Cup Qualification
18	14 August 2013	Wembley Stadium, London, England	England	2–1	2–3	Friendly

=== Manager ===
As of matches played 6 November 2026

Team	From	To	Record					Ref.
Team	From	To	G	W	D	L	Win %	Ref.
Livingston	30 June 2018	19 August 2018	7	3	2	2	42.86	
Falkirk (caretaker)	14 April 2022	4 May 2022	3	1	1	1	33.33	
Maccabi Tel Aviv	4 May 2026	present	26	15	6	5	57.69	
Total			36	19	9	8	52.78	—

== Honours ==
=== Player ===
Wolverhampton Wanderers

- Football League First Division play-offs: 2003

Celtic

- Scottish Premier League: 2006–07
- Scottish Cup: 2006–07

Rangers

- Scottish Premier League: 2008–09, 2009–10, 2010–11 (Note: Miller left Rangers on 21 January 2011, but he made enough league appearances in 2010–11 to qualify for a winners' medal.)
- Scottish Championship: 2015–16 (second tier)
- Scottish Cup: 2008–09
- Scottish League Cup: 2009–10
- Scottish Challenge Cup: 2015–16

Cardiff City

- Football League Cup runner-up: 2011–12

Individual

- SPFA Young Player of the Year: 1999–2000
- Scottish FA International Roll of Honour: 2010
- Scottish Premier League Player of the Month: April 2010, August 2010, September 2010
- Scottish Championship Player of the Month: January 2016
- Scottish Premier League Golden Boot: 2010–11
- Rangers FC Supporters' Player of the Year: 2016–17
- Rangers FC Players' Player of the Year: 2016–17
- Rangers FC Goal of the Season: 2016–17

=== Manager ===
Maccabi Tel Aviv

- Israel State Cup: 2025–26

== See also ==
- Played for Celtic and Rangers
- List of Scotland national football team captains
