= 2005–06 Falkirk F.C. season =

Falkirk
- Stadium: Falkirk Stadium
- Scottish Premier League: 10th
- Scottish Cup: Quarter Final
- Scottish League Cup: Third round

The 2005–06 season saw Falkirk compete in the Scottish Premier League where they finished in 10th position with 33 points.

== Final league table ==
Pos	Team	Pld	W	D	L	GF	GA	GD	Pts	Qualification or relegation (Note: Teams played each other three times (33 matches), before the league split into two groups (the top six and the bottom six) for the last five matches.)
8	Motherwell	38	13	10	15	55	61	−6	49	
9	Dundee United	38	7	12	19	41	66	−25	33	
10	Falkirk	38	8	9	21	35	64	−29	33	
11	Dunfermline Athletic	38	8	9	21	33	68	−35	33	
12	Livingston (R)	38	4	6	28	25	79	−54	18	Relegation to the Scottish First Division

Source: Scottish Professional Football League
Rules for classification: 1) Points; 2) Goal difference; 3) Goals scored
(R) Relegated

== Results ==
Falkirk's score comes first

=== Legend ===
Win	Draw	Loss

=== Scottish Premier League ===
Match	Date	Opponent	Venue	Result	Attendance	Scorers
1	30 July 2005	Inverness Caledonian Thistle	H	0–2	4,561	
2	6 August 2005	Livingston	A	2–0	4,052	Latapy 28', Duffy 72'
3	13 August 2005	Celtic	A	1–3	57,782	Duffy 39'
4	20 August 2005	Hibernian	H	0–2	6,268	
5	27 August 2005	Aberdeen	A	0–3	12,249	
6	10 September 2005	Rangers	H	1–1	6,500	McBreen 78'
7	17 September 2005	Motherwell	A	0–5	5,625	
8	24 September 2005	Kilmarnock	A	1–1	5,507	Gow 11'
9	2 October 2005	Heart of Midlothian	H	2–2	6,342	Duffy 27', Pressley 68' (o.g.)
10	15 October 2005	Dunfermline Athletic	A	1–0	7,068	Duffy 40'
11	22 October 2005	Dundee United	H	1–3	5,316	Duffy 3'
12	26 October 2005	Inverness Caledonian Thistle	A	3–0	3,660	Thomson 22', Duffy 70', Moutinho 90'
13	29 October 2005	Livingston	H	1–1	4,786	Pinxten 20' (o.g.)
14	6 November 2005	Celtic	H	0–3	6,459	
15	19 November 2005	Hibernian	A	3–2	13,092	Duffy (2) 48', 73', Gow 55'
16	26 November 2005	Aberdeen	H	1–2	5,826	McBreen 83'
17	3 December 2005	Rangers	A	2–2	48,042	Gow 69', Moutinho 71'
18	10 December 2005	Motherwell	H	0–1	4,972	
19	17 December 2005	Kilmarnock	H	1–2	4,804	Milne 74'
20	26 December 2005	Heart of Midlothian	A	0–5	16,538	
21	31 December 2005	Dunfermline Athletic	H	1–2	6,235	Duffy 68'
22	15 January 2006	Dundee United	A	1–2	7,948	McBreen 69'
23	21 January 2006	Inverness Caledonian Thistle	H	1–4	4,772	Ireland 11'
24	28 January 2006	Livingston	A	1–0	4,577	O'Donnell 35'
25	8 February 2006	Celtic	A	1–2	56,672	Milne 83'
26	11 February 2006	Hibernian	H	0–0	5,937	
27	18 February 2006	Aberdeen	A	0–1	11,538	
28	4 March 2006	Rangers	H	1–2	6,348	Latapy 66'
29	11 March 2006	Motherwell	A	1–3	8,179	Cregg 55'
30	18 March 2006	Kilmarnock	A	1–2	5,443	McBreen 19'
31	25 March 2006	Heart of Midlothian	H	1–2	5,966	Gow 45'
32	1 April 2006	Dunfermline Athletic	A	1–1	6,836	Ross 21'
33	8 April 2006	Dundee United	H	1–0	4,473	Ross 23'
34	15 April 2006	Dunfermline Athletic	H	0–0	5,413	
35	22 April 2006	Motherwell	H	1–1	4,467	Gow 16'
36	29 April 2006	Dundee United	A	2–0	5,798	Gow 18', McBreen 39'
37	3 May 2006	Inverness Caledonian Thistle	A	0–2	3,121	
38	6 May 2006	Livingston	H	1–0	5,355	McBreen 74'

=== Scottish Cup ===
Match	Date	Opponent	Venue	Result	Attendance	Scorers
R3	7 January 2006	Brechin City	H	2–1	2,624	Gow (2) 32', 64'
R4	4 February 2006	Ross County	H	1–1	3,649	McBreen 79'
R4 Replay	14 February 2006	Ross County	A	1–0	2,372	Gow 63'
QF	25 February 2006	Hibernian	H	1–5	6,259	McBreen 70'

=== Scottish League Cup ===
Match	Date	Opponent	Venue	Result	Attendance	Scorers
R2	23 August 2005	Partick Thistle	H	2–1	2,575	O'Donnell (2) 10', 24'
R3	21 September 2005	Celtic	A	1–2	24,953	Gow 54'
