= Tony Rougier =

Trinidadian former footballer (born 1971)

Personal information
- Full name: Anthony Leo Rougier
- Date of birth: 17 July 1971 (age 55)
- Place of birth: Sobo Village, Trinidad and Tobago
- Height: 5 ft 10 in (1.78 m)
- Position: Midfielder

Senior career*
Years	Team	Apps	(Gls)
1986–1989	La Brea Angels		
1990–1992	Trintoc		
1992–1993	United Petrotrin		
1994	Trinity Pros		
1995–1997	Raith Rovers	56	(2)
1997–1999	Hibernian	45	(4)
1999–2000	Port Vale	51	(8)
2000–2003	Reading	86	(6)
2003	→ Brighton & Hove Albion (loan)	6	(2)
2003–2004	Brentford	31	(4)
2004	Bristol City	6	(1)
2004	Nanjing Yoyo	14	(2)
2005	Rochester Rhinos	6	(0)
2006–2007	United Petrotrin		(3)
2008	East Stars	0	(0)
2009–2011	FC South End	11	(4)
Total		310	(38)

International career
1995–2005	Trinidad and Tobago	67	(5)

Managerial career
- 2009–2011: FC South End (Technical Director)
- * Club domestic league appearances and goals

Anthony Leo Rougier (born 17 July 1971) is a Trinidadian former footballer. A former international with 67 caps to his name, he came close to making the 2006 FIFA World Cup team for Trinidad and Tobago.

He played for La Brea Angels, Trintoc, United Petrotrin, and Trinity Pros before signing with Scottish club Raith Rovers in March 1995. He helped the club to the First Division title in 1994–95 before joining Hibernian in July 1997 for a £250,000 fee. He helped "Hibs" to secure the First Division title in 1998–99, before he was sold to English club Port Vale for £175,000 in January 1999. He moved on to Reading for £325,000 in August 2000 and helped the "Royals" to promotion out of the Second Division in 2000–01. He switched to Brentford in May 2003 before joining Bristol City in March 2004. He then had spells in China with Nanjing Yoyo and in America with Rochester Rhinos before returning to Trinidad to play for United Petrotrin, North East Stars, and FC South End.

== Club career ==
Starting his career in his native Trinidad and Tobago with La Brea Angels, Trintoc, United Petrotrin, and Trinity Pros, Rougier switched to the Caribbean for Raith Rovers of Kirkcaldy, Scotland in March 1995. He would have signed for Bradford City but could not secure a work permit in time.

He spent the first half of 1998–99 with Hibernian, playing 18 games and scoring once against Morton. It would prove to be an easy campaign for Alex McLeish's "Hibs", as they eventually finished 23 points clear of second place Falkirk. Rougier was not at Easter Road for the celebrations, however, having been sold to English club Port Vale for £175,000 in January 1999. He arrived at Vale Park with the club about to suffer a drastic downturn in fortunes as chairman Bill Bell replaced manager John Rudge with Brian Horton. He made twelve appearances for Vale at the end of the season. Rougier scored nine goals in 41 games in 1999–2000, becoming a crowd favourite and the club's top scorer, but it was not enough to prevent the "Valiants" from losing their First Division status. Chairman Bill Bell was not as keen on the player as the supporters, bemoaning Rougier's international commitments by stating "he may have been on the pitch nearly 40 times, but he did not play 40 games".

In August 2000 he was sold to fellow Second Division side Reading for £325,000, signing a three-year contract. Reading got to the play-off final at the end of the 2000–01 season, but Rougier scored an own goal as they lost to Walsall after extra time.

"He's almost becoming a Cantona sort of figure for us, everything's coming off him. And as long as Nicky Forster is scoring and others are chipping in, he doesn't need to score."

— Reading manager Alan Pardew speaking in February 2002.

The following season, the club pushed for a second-successive promotion, aiming for the Premier League. Rougier was loaned out to Brighton & Hove Albion late in the season, scoring twice for the "Seagulls" in six appearances, leading to speculation of a permanent transfer. Returning to the Madejski Stadium in time for the play-offs, he played a part of the semi-final second leg, replacing Darius Henderson after 64 minutes. Eventual play-off winners Wolverhampton Wanderers beat Reading 3–1 on aggregate. At the end of the campaign, Rougier was not offered a new contract, and instead signed with Brentford.

Rougier played 34 games for Brentford in the 2003–04 season before switching to Bristol City in late March. On 2 May, his 21st-minute winner over Barnsley proved not enough to catch Queens Park Rangers, though the club had easily qualified for the play-offs. He scored the opener of the semi-final with Hartlepool United at Victoria Park, City winning 2–1 on aggregate, before falling 1–0 at the Millennium Stadium to his old club Brighton. He was then released by City.

After a short spell with Chinese club Nanjing Yoyo and speculation of signing with Northampton Town in September 2005, he spent a brief period in the US with USL Pro club Rochester Rhinos. He ended his playing career back in Trinidad with United Petrotrin before becoming a Technical Advisor at North East Stars under manager David Farrell in 2008. In 2009, he co-founded FC South End, which is the newest club to compete in the TT Pro League. In July 2009, he registered himself as a player-coach to boost the fortunes of his struggling side.

== International career ==
Rougier earned 67 caps for the Trinidad and Tobago national team between 1995 and 2005, scoring five goals. He served as captain on numerous occasions. During this time his country won the Caribbean Cup in 1996 and 1999, beating Cuba on home soil in the final on both occasions. They also reached the final in 1998, but were beaten 2–1 by Jamaica. He was also in the squad for the 1996 and 2000 editions of the CONCACAF Gold Cup.

He was on the 24-man shortlist for the squad for the 2006 FIFA World Cup, but was excluded from the final 23. Manager Leo Beenhakker said: "The guy worked fantastically and he did everything he had to do to try and make it and in the end I had to make a decision."

== Personal life ==
A "proud and passionate Christian", Rougier used to celebrate goals with a prayer.

"My team-mates found it funny at first. But now that they know me, they understand and respect it. My christian life comes first, my football second. Without Him I couldn't do what I'm doing. I can get strength to achieve anything I want, because with God all things are possible."

— Rougier speaking on his religious views.

He advised good friend and fellow footballer Dwight Yorke to "calm down a bit with the ladies" following Yorke's love life being splashed across the British tabloids. He grew up next door to cricketer Gus Logie and worked at an airport in New York City before trying his luck with football in England.

Rougier is a lifelong teetotaler. On multiple occasions during his playing career, he was awarded a bottle of champagne for winning the man of the match award, only to refuse it and hand it back to the organisers.

He is married with children.

== Career statistics ==
=== Club ===
Appearances and goals by club, season and competition
Club	Season	League			National cup (Note: Includes Scottish Cup, FA Cup, Chinese FA Cup, U.S. Open Cup)		League cup (Note: Includes Scottish League Cup, Football League Cup)		Other		Total	
Club	Season	Division	Apps	Goals	Apps	Goals	Apps	Goals	Apps	Goals	Apps	Goals
Raith Rovers	1996–97	Scottish Premier League	29	1	1	1	1	2	—		31	4
Hibernian	1997–98	Scottish Premier League	30	3	0	0	1	0	—		31	3
Hibernian	1998–99	Scottish First Division	15	1	0	0	3	0	—		18	1
Hibernian	Total		45	4	0	0	4	0	—		49	4
Port Vale	1998–99	First Division	13	0	—		—		—		13	0
Port Vale	1999–2000	First Division	38	8	1	0	2	1	—		41	9
Port Vale	2000–01	Second Division	0	0	0	0	0	0	0	0	0	0
Port Vale	Total		51	8	1	0	2	1	0	0	54	9
Reading	2000–01	Second Division	33	2	2	0	1	0	2 (Note: Appearances in Football League Trophy)	0	38	2
Reading	2001–02	Second Division	33	1	1	0	3	0	2	0	39	0
Reading	2002–03	First Division	20	3	0	0	1	0	1 (Note: Appearance in First Division play-offs)	0	22	3
Reading	Total		86	6	3	0	5	0	5	0	99	6
Brighton & Hove Albion (loan)	2002–03	First Division	6	2	—		—		—		6	2
Brentford	2003–04	Second Division	31	4	2	1	0	0	1	0	34	5
Bristol City	2003–04	Second Division	6	1	—		—		3 (Note: Appearances in Second Division play-offs)	1	9	2
Nanjing Yoyo	2004	China League One	14	2	0	0	—		—		14	2
Rochester Rhinos	2005	USL First Division	6	0	0	0	—		—		6	0
Career total			274	28	7	2	12	3	!9	1	302	34

=== International ===
Trinidad and Tobago national team
Year	Apps	Goals
1995	1	0
1996	10	2
1997	1	0
1998	8	0
1999	9	1
2000	11	1
2001	8	0
2002	0	0
2003	0	0
2004	10	1
2005	9	0
Total	67	5

Scores and results list Trinidad and Tobago's goal tally first, score column indicates score after each Rougier goal.

List of international goals scored by Tony Rougier
No.	Date	Venue	Opponent	Score	Result	Competition
1	26 May 1996	Industry Park, Palo Seco, Trinidad and Tobago	Suriname	3–0	3–0	1996 Caribbean Cup
2	23 June 1996	Queen's Park Oval, Port of Spain, Trinidad and Tobago	Dominican Republic	4–0	8–0	1998 FIFA World Cup qualification
3	13 June 1999	Hasely Crawford Stadium, Port of Spain, Trinidad and Tobago	Cuba	1–0	2–1	1999 Caribbean Cup
4	16 August 2000	Queen's Park Oval, Port of Spain, Trinidad and Tobago	Panama	1–0	6–0	2002 FIFA World Cup qualification
5	10 July 2004	Supachalasai Stadium, Bangkok, Thailand	Thailand	1–0	2–3	Friendly
