= Klaus Dietrich =

Austrian footballer

Personal information
- Date of birth: 27 June 1974 (age 52)
- Place of birth: Austria
- Position: Defender

Team information
- Current team: SV Absdorf

Youth career
- –1991: Austria Vienna

Senior career*
Years	Team	Apps	(Gls)
1991–1992	Austria Vienna II		
1992–1994	Wiener SC	41	(0)
1994	Austria Salzburg	2	(0)
1994–1998	Grazer AK	22	(2)
1996	→ ESK Graz (loan)		
1998	→ SV Gerasdorf/Stammersdorf (loan)		
1998–2000	FC Kärnten		
1998–1999	→ Hibernian (loan)	1	(0)
2000–2001	Dynamo Dresden	32	(8)
2001–2002	1. FC Magdeburg	25	(2)
2002–2003	Dresdner SC	4	(0)
2003–2005	LASK Linz	31	(2)
2005	SV Schwechat	14	(3)
2005–2007	First Vienna	43	(5)
2007–2008	ASK Kottingbrunn		
2008	SC Eisenstadt	9	(0)
2008–2010	SV Stockerau		
2010–2011	SV Langenrohr		
2011–2012	SV Würmla		
2012–	SV Absdorf		
- * Club domestic league appearances and goals

Klaus Dietrich (born 27 June 1974) is an Austrian footballer.

He played one game for Hibernian in the 1998–99 season, a 2–0 defeat against St Mirren on 12 September 1998.
