= Liam O'Sullivan =

Scottish footballer (1981–2002)

Personal information
- Full name: Liam O'Sullivan
- Date of birth: 28 October 1981
- Place of birth: Edinburgh, Scotland
- Date of death: 29 April 2002 (aged 20)
- Place of death: Haddington, Scotland
- Position: Defender

Youth career
- –1997: Hutchison Vale
- 1997–2000: Hibernian

Senior career*
Years	Team	Apps	(Gls)
2000–2002	Hibernian	0	(0)
2000	→ Keflavík (loan)	7	(0)
2000	→ Clydebank (loan)	5	(0)
2000	→ Brechin City (loan)	1	(0)
- * Club domestic league appearances and goals

Liam O'Sullivan (28 October 1981 – 29 April 2002) was a Scottish football player, who played as a defender for Hibernian, Clydebank and Brechin City.

O'Sullivan achieved success in youth football with Hutchison Vale, and signed a five-year contract with Hibernian after leaving school in 1997. In May 2000, he joined Icelandic top division club Keflavík on loan. He went on to play seven league matches for the club, before being recalled by Hibernian manager Alex McLeish two months later. O'Sullivan played in the Scottish Football League for both Clydebank and Brechin City during 2000, but then suffered a serious knee injury. As he was battling to recover from that injury, O'Sullivan was found dead in a friend's house in Haddington. It was suspected that a drugs overdose, including methadone and ecstasy, was the cause of death.
