= Iain Nicolson =

Scottish footballer (born 1976)

Personal information
- Date of birth: 13 October 1976 (age 50)
- Place of birth: Glasgow, Scotland
- Position: Midfielder

Team information
- Current team: Renfrew

Senior career*
Years	Team	Apps	(Gls)
1993–1997	Rangers	0	(0)
1997–1998	Partick Thistle	32	(2)
1998–2002	St Mirren	115	(7)
2002–2003	Ayr United	25	(0)
2003–2006	Alloa Athletic	85	(9)
2006-2010	Bathgate Thistle		
- Renfrew
Total		257	(18)
- * Club domestic league appearances and goals

Iain Nicolson (born 13 October 1976) is a Scottish former professional footballer who plays as a midfielder for SJF Central Division 1 side Renfrew.

== Career ==
Born in Glasgow, Nicolson began his career as a youth at Rangers. However, having failed to break into the Ibrox side's first-team after four years, Nicolson joined local side Partick Thistle in 1997. He made a good impression at the Firhill club, and subsequently joined Scottish First Division side St Mirren the following year. Over the next four years, Nicolson became a key player at the Paisley side, and helped them win the 1999–2000 Scottish First Division and achieve promotion to the Scottish Premier League. Overall, Nicolson made 105 appearances for the Buddies.

In 2003, he left St Mirren and joined First Division side Ayr United, before moving on to Alloa Athletic the following year. He spent three years and made over 77 appearances with Alloa, before leaving professional football. He subsequently spent time at junior team Bathgate Thistle, and joined Renfrew in July 2010, where he currently plays.

== Personal life ==
In April 2015, Nicolson suffered a stroke and was taken to the Royal Alexandra Hospital in Paisley. He spent two days in hospital before being moved to his home. He is believed to be recovering well. St Mirren chief executive Brian Caldwell said: "Iain remains a popular player with the club and its supporters and we are all hoping that he makes a full and speedy recovery."
