= Scott Bannerman =

Scottish footballer (born 1979)

Personal information
- Full name: Scott Bannerman
- Date of birth: 21 March 1979 (age 47)
- Place of birth: Edinburgh, Scotland
- Position: Right midfielder

Senior career*
Years	Team	Apps	(Gls)
1996–2001	Hibernian	16	(0)
1999	→ Alloa Athletic (loan)	2	(0)
2001	→ Airdrieonians (loan)	9	(1)
2001–2005	Greenock Morton	99	(14)
2005–2006	Dumbarton	23	(0)
2006	Cowdenbeath	1	(0)
2006–2007	Raith Rovers	1	(0)
- Bathgate Thistle
Total		151	(15)
- * Club domestic league appearances and goals as of 4 June 2011

Scott Bannerman (born 21 March 1979 in Edinburgh) is a Scottish former footballer.

Bannerman's best season in senior football was when he was top goal scorer for Greenock Morton in season 2001–2002, in Peter Cormack's hastily put together squad that was relegated in their first season in the Scottish Football League Second Division after being relegated the previous season after suffering financial difficulty under previous chairman Hugh Scott.

After leaving Raith Rovers, Bannerman played for junior side Bathgate Thistle, and helped them win the Scottish Junior Cup for the first time.

Throughout his career, Bannerman accumulated a total of 151 league appearances and scored 15 goals.

== Honours ==
Greenock Morton

- Scottish Football League Third Division: 1

2002/03

Bathgate Thistle

- Scottish Junior Cup: 1

2007/08
