= Chris Kerr (footballer) =

Scottish footballer (born 1978)

Chris Kerr (born 6 September 1978) is a Scottish former professional footballer. Kerr played in nearly 100 competitive matches for St Mirren, his local professional club. His career was stunted by a serious knee injury suffered in 1999, when opponent Ross Tokely committed an "overzealous tackle" on Kerr. Tokely's challenge caused damage to his cruciate ligament and forced Kerr out of the game for nearly 18 months. After this incident, St Mirren fans repeatedly barracked Tokely during matches.
