= Tom Smith (footballer, born 1973) =

Scottish footballer

Personal information
- Full name: Thomas Smith
- Date of birth: 12 October 1973 (age 53)
- Place of birth: Glasgow, Scotland
- Position: Defender

Senior career*
Years	Team	Apps	(Gls)
1992–1996	Partick Thistle	49	(4)
1996–1998	Ayr United	22	(5)
1998–1999	Clydebank	21	(2)
1999–2001	Hibernian	34	(0)
- * Club domestic league appearances and goals

Thomas Smith (born 12 October 1973) is a Scottish former footballer. Smith played in the Scottish Premier League and Scottish Football League for Partick Thistle, Ayr United, Clydebank and Hibernian. Smith won a Second Division championship with Ayr. He moved to Hibs in January 1999 and established himself as the club's first choice left-back during the 1999–2000 season. Early in the following season he began to suffer a degenerative knee injury, however, which forced him to retire from the game aged 27. Manager Alex McLeish and managing director Rod Petrie both paid tribute to Smith's service and offered the club's assistance.
