= Justin Skinner (footballer, born 1969) =

English footballer

Personal information
- Full name: Justin Skinner
- Date of birth: 30 January 1969 (age 57)
- Place of birth: Chiswick, England
- Height: 6 ft 0 in (1.83 m)
- Position: Midfielder

Senior career*
Years	Team	Apps	(Gls)
1986–1991	Fulham	135	(23)
1991–1998	Bristol Rovers	187	(12)
1997	→ Walsall (loan)	10	(1)
1998–1999	Hibernian	32	(2)
1999–2002	Dunfermline Athletic	90	(0)
2002–2005	Brechin City	20	(0)
Total		444	(35)
- * Club domestic league appearances and goals

Justin Skinner (born 30 January 1969) is an English former footballer who played for Fulham, Bristol Rovers, Walsall, Hibernian, Dunfermline Athletic and Brechin City.

He began his career at Fulham and played over 150 games for the club, before moving to Bristol Rovers in 1991 for £130,000—where he remained until 1998. He later played for Scottish clubs Hibernian, Dunfermline and Brechin City before retiring from playing in 2005.

== Management ==
Skinner worked at both Chelsea's and Queens Park Rangers' youth academies before becoming QPR's reserve team manager in June 2006. He then became assistant manager at Lewes, helping them to win the Conference South championship in 2008. Skinner signed a two-year contract to become assistant manager at Farnborough in 2009.
