= Michael Renwick =

Scottish footballer and manager

Personal information
- Date of birth: 29 February 1976 (age 50)
- Place of birth: Edinburgh, Scotland
- Position: Defender

Team information
- Current team: Mountain View Los Altos Soccer Club

Senior career*
| Years | Team | Apps | (Gls) |
| 1991–2000 | Hibernian | 51 | (0) |
| 2000–2002 | Ayr United | 15 | (0) |
| 2001 | → Greenock Morton (loan) | 2 | (0) |
| 2002 | → Cowdenbeath (loan) | 7 | (0) |
| 2002–2003 | Cowdenbeath | 36 | (0) |
| 2003–2004 | Glenavon | 38 | |
| 2004 | Arbroath | 1 | (0) |
| 2004–2005 | East Fife | 32 | (0) |
| 2005–2006 | Stenhousemuir | 29 | (1) |

Managerial career
- 2007–2008: Berwick Rangers
- 2009–2013: Heriot-Watt University
- 2013–2019: Red Star Soccer Academy
- * Club domestic league appearances and goals

Michael Renwick (born 29 February 1976 in Edinburgh) is a Scottish former professional footballer who played for Hibernian, Ayr United, Greenock Morton, Cowdenbeath, East Fife and Stenhousemuir. He also had a spell as manager of Berwick Rangers.

== Playing career ==
Renwick played for Hutchison Vale Boys Club, before joining Hibernian in December 1991. He remained at Easter Road until May 2000 when he left to join Ayr United on a free transfer. He spent September 2001 on loan to Greenock Morton and in March 2002 joined Cowdenbeath on loan.

In August 2002, Renwick joined Cowdenbeath on a free transfer and although a regular the following season, he left in July 2003. He spent the following season with Glenavon before returning to Scotland in the 2004 close season. He joined Stirling Albion on trial before joining Arbroath where he played as a trialist against Stirling. Soon after, he signed for East Fife. He joined Stenhousemuir in May 2005, leaving in May 2006.

== Coaching career ==
Renwick became assistant manager, working with Mixu Paatelainen of Cowdenbeath in May 2006. Renwick was appointed manager of Berwick Rangers in October 2007, but he was sacked in April 2008. He joined Falkirk's backroom staff in August 2008, and was then appointed as head coach of Heriot-Watt University in 2009. In January 2011 he was appointed head coach of the Scottish Universities national team. Renwick became the first Scottish Universities head coach to win the Home Nations Championship for over 10 years. He was then invited to become assistant coach for the Great Britain Universities team in preparation for the World University Games in Shenzhen.

In August 2013, Renwick was appointed Senior Academy Coach at the Red Star Soccer Academy in Los Altos, California.
