= Mark Dempsie =

Scottish footballer

Personal information
- Date of birth: 19 October 1980 (age 46)
- Place of birth: Bellshill, Scotland
- Position: Central defender

Youth career
- 1997–1998: Hibernian

Senior career*
Years	Team	Apps	(Gls)
1998–2003	Hibernian	23	(0)
2000	→ Raith Rovers (loan)	2	(0)
2003–2005	St Mirren	36	(0)
2005–2007	Dumbarton	42	(0)
- * Club domestic league appearances and goals

Mark Dempsie (born 19 October 1980, in Bellshill) is a Scottish former professional footballer. Dempsie played as a central defender for Hibernian, Raith Rovers, St Mirren and Dumbarton. Dempsie's younger brother Allan also played for Hibs.

Dempsie made the breakthrough into the Hibs 1st team squad as a 17-year-old, and looked like an excellent prospect and was awarded with a new four-year contract by then boss Alex McLeish. Dempsie tasted success with the Hibees, winning the 98/99 1st Division title along with being voted the 98/99 Hibs Young Player of the Year. Dempsie was also included in Alex Smith's Scotland U21 squads during the 99/00 season. Unfortunately, Dempsie would be plagued by back injuries during the next few years at the Hibees. He then moved onto St Mirren in 2003 where again he was hindered by the same back problems that he had at Hibs. He eventually ended up at Dumbarton, but he was told in 2007 by medics that his football career was over and was forced to retire due to his back injury.
