= Alex Marinkov =

French footballer (born 1967)

Personal information
- Full name: Alexandre Marinkov
- Date of birth: 2 December 1967 (age 58)
- Place of birth: Grenoble, France
- Position: Defender

Senior career*
Years	Team	Apps	(Gls)
-1986	Albertville		
1986-1991	Annecy FC	105	(8)
1991-1992	FC Martigues	8	(0)
1993-1994	Annecy FC	6	(0)
1994-1995	Limoges FC		
1995-1998	US Raon-l'Étape	55	(4)
1998-1999	Scarborough	22	(4)
1999	Hibernian	10	(1)
1999-2001	US Raon-l'Étape		
2001-2002	Annecy FC		
2004-2006	Cluses-Scionzier Football Club		
- * Club domestic league appearances and goals

Alexandre Marinkov (born December 2, 1967 in Grenoble) is a French retired footballer. He was signed for Hibernian by manager Alex McLeish the same day as fellow French player, Franck Sauzée.
