= 1998–99 Scottish First Division =

Scottish First Division
- Season: 1998–99
- Champions: Hibernian
- Promoted: Hibernian
- Relegated: Hamilton Academical; Stranraer
- Top goalscorer: Glynn Hurst (18)
- Biggest home win: Ayr United 7-1 Stranraer, 19.09.1998
- Biggest away win: St Mirren 1-5 Airdrieonians, 12.12.1998; St Mirren 1-5 Morton, 10.04.1999

The 1998–99 Scottish First Division was won by Hibernian who bounced straight back up to the Scottish Premier League after relegation the previous season and finished 23 points ahead of nearest challengers Falkirk. Hamilton Academical and Stranraer were relegated to the Second Division. In the case of Stranraer, they didn't manage to compete well enough in this division following on from their promotion a year earlier.

== Stadia and locations ==
Airdrieonians	Ayr United	Clydebank	Falkirk
Excelsior Stadium	Somerset Park	Boghead Park, Dumbarton	Brockville Park
Capacity: 10,101	Capacity: 10,185	Capacity: 2,500	Capacity: 7,500
Greenock Morton	1998–99 Scottish First Division is located in Scotland South		Hamilton Academical
Cappielow Park	1998–99 Scottish First Division is located in Scotland South		Cliftonhill, Coatbridge
Capacity: 11,612	1998–99 Scottish First Division is located in Scotland South		Capacity: 1,238
Hibernian	Raith Rovers	St Mirren	Stranraer
Easter Road	Stark's Park	Love Street	Stair Park
Capacity: 16,531	Capacity: 9,031	Capacity: 10,900	Capacity: 4,178

== League table ==
Pos	Team	Pld	W	D	L	GF	GA	GD	Pts	Promotion or relegation
1	Hibernian (C, P)	36	28	5	3	84	33	+51	89	Promotion to the Premier League
2	Falkirk	36	20	6	10	60	38	+22	66	
3	Ayr United	36	19	5	12	66	42	+24	62	
4	Airdrieonians	36	18	5	13	42	43	−1	59	
5	St Mirren	36	14	10	12	42	43	−1	52	
6	Morton	36	14	7	15	45	41	+4	49	
7	Clydebank	36	11	13	12	36	38	−2	46	
8	Raith Rovers	36	8	11	17	37	57	−20	35	
9	Hamilton Academical (R)	36	6	10	20	30	62	−32	28	Relegation to the Second Division
10	Stranraer (R)	36	5	2	29	29	74	−45	17	Relegation to the Second Division

Source: "1998-1999 First Division - SPFL Archive". SPFL.
Rules for classification: 1) points; 2) goal difference; 3) number of goals scored.
(C) Champions; (P) Promoted; (R) Relegated
