= 1987–88 Middlesbrough F.C. season =

Middlesbrough
1987-88 season
- Manager: Bruce Rioch
- Football League Second Division: 3rd (promoted)
- FA Cup: 4th round
- League Cup: 2nd round
- Simod Cup: 1st round
- Top goalscorer: League: Bernie Slaven; All: Bernie Slaven
- Highest home attendance: Home: 27,645 (vs Leicester City); Away: 34,186 (vs Leeds United)
- Lowest home attendance: Home: 9,344 (vs Swindon Town); Away: 5,603 (vs Shrewsbury Town)

During the 1987–88 season, Middlesbrough participated in the Football League Second Division following their promotion the previous season. They were promoted to the First Division at the end of the season having finished third in the league and winning the play-offs.

== Team kit and sponsors ==
During the 1987–88 season, Middlesbrough moved to a striped white top half on their home kit with the kits made by Skill and sponsored by Dickens.

== League table ==
Pos	Team	Pld	W	D	L	GF	GA	GD	Pts	Relegation
1	Millwall (C, P)	44	25	7	12	72	52	+20	82	Promotion to the First Division
2	Aston Villa (P)	44	22	12	10	68	41	+27	78	Promotion to the First Division
3	Middlesbrough (O, P)	44	22	12	10	63	36	+27	78	Qualification for the Second Division play-offs
4	Bradford City	44	22	11	11	74	54	+20	77	Qualification for the Second Division play-offs
5	Blackburn Rovers	44	21	14	9	68	52	+16	77	Qualification for the Second Division play-offs

Rules for classification: 1) Points; 2) Goal difference; 3) Goals scored
(C) Champions; (O) Play-off winners; (P) Promoted

== League Results ==
=== Football League First Division ===
15 August 1987 1	Middlesbrough	1–1	Millwall	Middlesbrough
	Stephens			Stadium: Ayresome Park; Attendance: 11,471

22 August 1987 2	Stoke City	2–0	Middlesbrough	Stoke-on-Trent
				Stadium: Victoria Ground; Attendance: 9,345

29 August 1987 3	Middlesbrough	1–0	Oldham Athletic	Middlesbrough
	Slaven			Stadium: Ayresome Park; Attendance: 10,551

17 September 1988 4	Crystal Palace	3–1	Middlesbrough	London
			Slaven	Stadium: Selhurst Park; Attendance: 6,671

5 September 1987 5	Middlesbrough	2–3	Swindon Town	Middlesbrough
	Stephens; Slaven			Stadium: Ayresome Park; Attendance: 9,344

8 September 1987 6	Aston Villa	0–1	Middlesbrough	Birmingham
			Kerr	Stadium: Villa Park; Attendance: 12,665

15 September 1987 7	Middlesbrough	3–0	Bournemouth	Middlesbrough
	Hamilton, Slaven			Stadium: Ayresome Park; Attendance: 9,660

19 September 1987 8	Middlesbrough	2–0	Leeds United	Middlesbrough
	Kerr; Pallister			Stadium: Ayresome Park; Attendance: 12,051

26 September 1987 9	Blackburn Rovers	0–2	Middlesbrough	Blackburn
			Kerr; Kernaghan	Stadium: Ewood Park; Attendance: 6,879

29 September 1987 10	Middlesbrough	0–0	Reading	Middlesbrough
				Stadium: Ayresome Park; Attendance: 19,788

3 October 1987 11	Bradford City	2–0	Middlesbrough	Bradford
				Stadium: Valley Parade; Attendance: 14,114

10 October 1987 12	Huddersfield Town	1–4	Middlesbrough	Huddersfield
			Slaven,, Laws	Stadium: Leeds Road; Attendance: 6,169

17 October 1987 13	Middlesbrough	2–1	West Brom	Middlesbrough
	Cooper; Slaven			Stadium: Ayresome Park; Attendance: 10,684

20 October 1987 14	Middlesbrough	3–1	Ipswich Town	Middlesbrough
	Kernaghan; Pallister; Slaven			Stadium: Ayresome Park; Attendance: 10,491

24 October 1987 15	Birmingham City	0–0	Middlesbrough	Birmingham
				Stadium: St Andrew's; Attendance: 7,404

31 October 1987 16	Middlesbrough	4–0	Shrewsbury Town	Middlesbrough
	Kernaghan; Slaven,,			Stadium: Ayresome Park; Attendance: 10,183

4 November 1987 17	Manchester City	1–1	Middlesbrough	Manchester
			Glover	Stadium: Maine Road; Attendance: 18,434

26 December 1988 18	Sheffield United	0–2	Middlesbrough	Sheffield
			Ripley; Slaven	Stadium: Bramall Lane; Attendance: 11,278

14 November 1987 19	Middlesbrough	1–0	Hull City	Middlesbrough
	Ripley			Stadium: Ayresome Park; Attendance: 15,709

2 January 1989 20	Plymouth Argyle	0–1	Middlesbrough	Plymouth
			Hamilton	Stadium: Home Park; Attendance: 9,428

28 November 1987 21	Middlesbrough	2–0	Barnsley	Middlesbrough
	Kernaghan; Slaven			Stadium: Ayresome Park; Attendance: 12,732

5 December 1987 22	Leicester City	0–0	Middlesbrough	Leicester
				Stadium: Filbert Street; Attendance: 9,411

12 December 1987 23	Middlesbrough	2–0	Stoke City	Middlesbrough
	Hamilton; Slaven			Stadium: Ayresome Park; Attendance: 12,289

19 December 1987 24	Bournemouth	0–0	Middlesbrough	Bournemouth
				Stadium: Dean Court; Attendance: 6,792

26 December 1987 25	Middlesbrough	1–1	Blackburn Rovers	Middlesbrough
	Slaven			Stadium: Ayresome Park; Attendance: 23,536

28 December 1987 26	Leeds United	2–0	Middlesbrough	Leeds
				Stadium: Elland Road; Attendance: 34,186

1 January 1988 27	Oldham Athletic	3–1	Middlesbrough	Oldham
			Kerr	Stadium: Boundary Park; Attendance: 8,181

16 January 1988 28	Millwall	2–1	Middlesbrough	London
			Slaven	Stadium: The Den; Attendance: 8,617

23 January 1988 29	Middlesbrough	2–1	Crystal Palace	Middlesbrough
	Mowbray; Glover (pen.)			Stadium: Ayresome Park; Attendance: 12,597

6 February 1988 30	Swindon Town	1–1	Middlesbrough	Swindon
			Mowbray	Stadium: County Ground; Attendance: 9,941

14 February 1988 31	Middlesbrough	2–1	Aston Villa	Middlesbrough
	Mowbray; Kernaghan		Daley	Stadium: Ayresome Park; Attendance: 16,957

20 February 1988 32	Reading	0–0	Middlesbrough	Reading
				Stadium: Elm Park; Attendance: 6,706

27 February 1988	Middlesbrough	1–2	Bradford City	Middlesbrough
	Cooper			Stadium: Ayresome Park; Attendance: 21,079

5 March 1988 34	West Bromwich Albion	0–0	Middlesbrough	West Bromwich
				Stadium: The Hawthorns; Attendance: 8,316

12 March 1988 35	Middlesbrough	2–0	Huddersfield Town	Middlesbrough
	Kerr; Glover (pen.)			Stadium: Ayresome Park; Attendance: 13,866

19 March 1988 36	Shrewsbury Town	0–1	Middlesbrough	Shrewsbury
			Glover (pen.)	Stadium: Gay Meadow; Attendance: 5,603

26 March 1988 37	Middlesbrough	1–1	Birmingham City	Middlesbrough
	Pallister			Stadium: Ayresome Park; Attendance: 15,465

2 April 1988 38	Middlesbrough	6–0	Sheffield United	Middlesbrough
	Ripley,, Senior, Slaven			Stadium: Ayresome Park; Attendance: 17,340

4 April 1988 39	Hull City	0–0	Middlesbrough	Hull
				Stadium: Boothferry Park; Attendance: 10,758

9 April 1988 40	Middlesbrough	2–1	Manchester City	Middlesbrough
	Hamilton; Ripley			Stadium: Ayresome Park; Attendance: 19,443

23 April 1988 41	Ipswich Town	4–0	Middlesbrough	Ipswich
				Stadium: Portman Road; Attendance: 12,773

30 April 1988 42	Middlesbrough	3–1	Plymouth Argyle	Middlesbrough
	Kernaghan; Hamilton; Ripley			Stadium: Ayresome Park; Attendance: 16,615

2 May 1988 43	Barnsley	0–3	Middlesbrough	Barnsley
			Ripley; Slaven,	Stadium: Oakwell; Attendance: 13,240

7 May 1988 44	Middlesbrough	1–2	Leicester City	Middlesbrough
	Slaven		McAllister; Weir	Stadium: Ayresome Park; Attendance: 27,645

=== Play-offs ===
15 May 1988 Semi final 1st leg	Bradford City	2–1	Middlesbrough	Bradford
	Goddard 67'; McCall		Senior 68'	Stadium: Valley Parade; Attendance: 16,017; Referee: David Scott

18 May 1988 Semi final 2nd leg	Middlesbrough	2–0 (a.e.t.)	Bradford City	Middlesbrough
	Slaven 35'; Hamilton 91'			Stadium: Ayresome Park; Attendance: 25,868; Referee: Joe Worrall

25 May 1988 Final 1st leg	Middlesbrough	2–0	Chelsea	Middlesbrough
	Senior 30'; Slaven 81'			Stadium: Ayresome Park; Attendance: 25,531; Referee: Keith Hackett

15 May 1988 Final 2nd leg	Chelsea	1–0	Middlesbrough	London
	Durie 18'			Stadium: Stamford Bridge; Attendance: 40,550; Referee: Brian Hill

== Cup Results ==
=== League Cup ===
18 August 1987 1st Round 1st leg	Sunderland	1–0	Middlesbrough	Sunderland
				Stadium: Roker Park; Attendance: 15,770

25 August 1987 1st Round 2nd leg	Middlesbrough	2–0	Sunderland	Middlesbrough
	Mowbray; Slaven			Stadium: Ayresome Park; Attendance: 15,570

23 September 1987 2nd Round 1st leg	Middlesbrough	0–1	Aston Villa	Middlesbrough
			Aspinall	Stadium: Ayresome Park; Attendance: 11,424

7 October 1987 2nd Round 2nd leg	Aston Villa	1–0	Middlesbrough	Birmingham
	Birch			Stadium: Villa Park; Attendance: 11,702

=== FA Cup ===
9 January 1988 3rd Round	Sutton United	1–1	Middlesbrough	Sutton
			Pallister	Stadium: Gander Green Lane; Attendance: 5,600

12 January 1988 3rd Round Replay	Middlesbrough	1–0	Sutton United	Middlesbrough
	Kerr			Stadium: Ayresome Park; Attendance: 17,932

30 January 1988 4th Round	Everton	1–1	Middlesbrough	Liverpool
	Sharp		Kerr	Stadium: Goodison Park; Attendance: 36,564

3 February 1988 4th Round Replay	Middlesbrough	2–2	Everton	Middlesbrough
	Mowbray; Kernaghan		Steven; Watson	Stadium: Ayresome Park; Attendance: 25,235

30 January 1988 4th Round 2nd Replay	Everton	2–1	Middlesbrough	Liverpool
	Sharp; Mowbray (o.g.)		Ripley	Stadium: Goodison Park; Attendance: 32,222

=== Simod Cup ===
10 November 1987 1st Round	Ipswich Town	1–0	Middlesbrough	Ipswich
				Attendance: 6,108

== Squad ==
=== Appearances and goals ===
Appearance and goalscoring records for all the players who were in the Middlesbrough F.C. first team squad during the 1987–88 season.

No.	Pos	Nat	Player	Total		Division 2		FA Cup		League Cup	
No.	Pos	Nat	Player	Apps	Goals	Apps	Goals	Apps	Goals	Apps	Goals
	GK	(England) ENG	Stephen Pears	55	0	47	0	4	0	4	0
	GK	(England) ENG	Kevin Poole	2	0	1	0	1	0	0	0
	DF	(England) ENG	Colin Cooper	55	2	46	2	5	0	4	0
	DF	(England) ENG	Dean Glover	50	4	42	4	4	0	4	0
	DF	(Republic of Ireland) IRL	Alan Kernaghan	42	7	36	6	3	1	3	0
	DF	(England) ENG	Tony Mowbray	57	5	48	3	5	1	4	1
	DF	(England) ENG	Gary Pallister	57	3	48	3	5	0	4	0
	DF	(England) ENG	Brian Laws	37	1	31	1	5	0	1	0
	DF	(England) ENG	Gary Parkinson	51	0	42	0	5	0	4	0
	MF	(England) ENG	Gary Gill	6	0	3	0	2	0	1	0
	MF	(England) ENG	Gary Hamilton	54	7	45	7	5	0	4	0
	MF	(England) ENG	Paul Kerr	57	7	48	5	5	2	4	0
	MF	(England) ENG	Stuart Ripley	55	9	47	8	4	1	4	0
	MF	(England) ENG	Mark Burke	18	0	16	0	2	0	0	0
	MF	(England) ENG	Paul Proudlock	1	0	1	0	0	0	0	0
	FW	(Republic of Ireland) IRL	Bernie Slaven	57	24	48	23	5	0	4	1
	MF	(England) ENG	Trevor Senior	10	4	10	4	0	0	0	0
	FW	(England) ENG	Archie Stephens	14	2	11	2	0	0	3	0

=== Coaching staff ===
- Manager: Bruce Rioch
- Assistant manager: Colin Todd

== Transfers ==
=== In ===
Date	Player	Previous club	Cost
August 1987	(England) Kevin Poole	Aston Villa	Free
June 1987	(England) Dean Glover	Aston Villa	£60,000
December 1987	(England) Mark Burke	Aston Villa	£50,000
January 1988	(Republic of Ireland) Tony Cousins	Chelsea	Free
March 1988	(England) Trevor Senior	Watford	£223,000

=== Out ===
Date	Player	Buying club	Cost
August 1987	(England) Lee Turnbull	Aston Villa	£59,000
July 1987	(Scotland) Ronnie Coyle	Rochdale	Free
December 1987	(England) Archie Stephens	Carlisle	Free

== References and notes ==
Category:Middlesbrough F.C. seasons Middlesbrough
