= 1985–86 Middlesbrough F.C. season =

Middlesbrough
1985–86 season
- Manager: Willie Maddren (until 2 February 1986); Bruce Rioch (from 2 February 1986)
- Stadium: Ayresome Park
- Division Two: 21st (relegated)
- FA Cup: Third round
- Milk Cup: First round

This period in the history of Middlesbrough is considered its most traumatic. The club was in financial difficulties which eventually led to liquidation in 1986 and the near loss of professional football on Teesside. At the end of 1985–86 season Boro were relegated to the old Third Division. By then Willie Maddren was no longer manager. He was sacked with 13 games remaining, replaced by his assistant Bruce Rioch. Maddren is remembered for his astute signings. Bernie Slaven was signed from part-time football in Scotland to become a Middlesbrough legend. Maddren also brought youth team players through the ranks, including Colin Cooper and Stuart Ripley.

August 1985 – Don O'Riordan's performances for Carlisle United earned himself a £55,000 move to Middlesbrough in August 1985. Despite missing only one game the following season, O'Riordan was released amidst Middlesbrough's financial crisis.

30 August 1985 – Newcastle United midfielder Pat Heard moves to Middlesbrough on a month's loan with a view to a permanent deal.

October 1985 – In a trial game against Bradford City, Bernie Slaven scored and impressed the Middlesbrough management enough to snap him up. Bradford also wanted him to sign on the dotted line, but the then Albion Rovers owner negotiated a deal with Middlesbrough which satisfied all parties and manager Willie Maddren picked Slaven up for a bargain price of £25,000.

22 October 1985 – Home team Sunderland beat ten man Middlesbrough 1–0 after Archie Stephens was sent off in the 33rd minute.

November 1985 – Middlesbrough beat Shrewsbury Town 3–1, in front of a home gate of 4,061, with goals from Gary Rowell, Pat Heard and Tony McAndrew.

2 January 1986 – Second Division strugglers Middlesbrough are reported to be £1 million in debt.

21 May 1986 – Middlesbrough, recently relegated to the Third Division for the second time in their history, are faced with the threat of losing their Football League status and going out of business after going into liquidation.

== Senior squad ==
The following are all the players who were involved the Middlesbrough F.C. first team at some point during the 1985–86 season. Note: Flags indicate national team as defined under FIFA eligibility rules; some limited exceptions apply. Players may hold more than one non-FIFA nationality.

Pos.	Nation	Player
GK	ENG	Stephen Pears
GK	ENG	Peter Flear
DF	ENG	Colin Cooper
DF	SCO	Tony McAndrew
DF	EIR	Alan Kernaghan
DF	ENG	Gary Pallister
DF	ENG	Pat Heard
DF	EIR	Don O'Riordan
MF	ENG	Mitch Cook
MF	ENG	Irving Nattrass
MF	ENG	Gary Gill
MF	SCO	Gary Hamilton
FW	ENG	David Currie
FW	ENG	Peter Duffield

Pos.	Nation	Player
DF	ENG	Brian Laws
DF	ENG	Tony Mowbray
DF	ENG	Steve Corden
MF	ENG	Stuart Ripley
MF	ENG	Gary Rowell
MF	ENG	Peter Beagrie
FW	EIR	Bernie Slaven
FW	ENG	Archie Stephens
FW	ENG	Lee Turnbull

== Second Division ==
Pos	Team	Pld	W	D	L	GF	GA	GD	Pts	Qualification or relegation
18	Sunderland	42	13	11	18	47	61	−14	50	
19	Blackburn Rovers	42	12	13	17	53	62	−9	49	
20	Carlisle United (R)	42	13	7	22	47	71	−24	46	Relegation to the Third Division
21	Middlesbrough (R)	42	12	9	21	44	53	−9	45	Relegation to the Third Division
22	Fulham (R)	42	10	6	26	45	69	−24	36	Relegation to the Third Division

Rules for classification: 1) Points; 2) Goal difference; 3) Goals scored
(R) Relegated

== See also ==
- 1986–87 Middlesbrough F.C. season
