= 2005–06 Hibernian F.C. season =

Hibernian
2005–06 season
- Chairman: Rod Petrie
- Manager: Tony Mowbray
- SPL: 4th
- Scottish Cup: Semi
- CIS Cup: Quarter
- UEFA Cup: R1
- Top goalscorer: League: Riordan, 16; All: Riordan, 20
- Highest home attendance: 17180
- Lowest home attendance: 10427
- Average home league attendance: 13818 (up 1279)

Season 2005–06 was a season of missed opportunities for Hibernian. The team started strongly in the league, winning 10 of their first 14 games, but this form dipped after Christmas. The Scottish Cup seemed to be opening up for Hibs after they defeated Rangers 3–0 at Ibrox in the fourth round, but they then lost 4–0 in an Edinburgh derby semi–final against Hearts. Hibs lost 3–0 in the quarter–final of the Scottish League Cup at Dunfermline, and were well beaten by Dnipro Dnipropetrovsk in the UEFA Cup.

== Pre-season ==
Hibs went on a three match tour of Ireland in early July, beating St Patrick's Athletic and drawing with Cork City and Shamrock Rovers. This was followed by a series of friendly matches against Scottish Football League clubs. Unusually, two of these matches were played on the same day as Hibs split their squad between matches at Ayr United and Queen of the South. Hibs then played a match against Rot-Weiss Essen to mark the 50th anniversary of the first European Cup competition before completing their pre-season schedule with a 1–0 win against Hartlepool United.

=== Results ===
3 July 2005 Friendly match	Cork City	3–3	Hibernian	Turners Cross, Cork
	O'Callaghan; O'Callaghan (pen.); Behan		Morrow; Fletcher; Morrow

5 July 2005 Friendly match	St Patrick's Athletic	0–5	Hibernian	Richmond Park, Dublin
			O'Connor; O'Connor; Morrow; O'Connor; Shiels

6 July 2005 Friendly match	Shamrock Rovers	1–1	Hibernian	Tolka Park, Dublin
	O'Neill (pen.)		Konte

12 July 2005 Friendly match	Berwick Rangers	1–4	Hibernian	Shielfield Park, Berwick
	Gordon		Riordan; Riordan; O'Connor; Riordan	Attendance: 1,158

13 July 2005 Friendly match	Stirling Albion	0–2	Hibernian	Forthbank Stadium, Stirling
			Morrow; Konte	Attendance: 1,450; Referee: Ian Frickleton

16 July 2005 Friendly match	Ayr United	1–1	Hibernian	Somerset Park, Ayr
	Hyslop		O'Connor	Attendance: 1,028

16 July 2005 Friendly match	Queen of the South	0–0	Hibernian	Palmerston Park, Dumfries
				Attendance: 1,226; Referee: John McKendrick

22 July 2005 Friendly match	Rot-Weiss Essen	0–3	Hibernian	Georg-Melches-Stadion, Essen
			Beuzelin; O'Connor; Caldwell	Attendance: 5,129

26 July 2005 Friendly match	Hibernian	1–0	Hartlepool United	Easter Road, Edinburgh
	Sproule			Attendance: 7,072

== League season ==
Hibs began the season inauspiciously, drawing 1–1 at home to Dunfermline, although a draw represented something of a recovery having been a goal and a man down at half time. The second match was an Edinburgh derby at Tynecastle, where Hibs felt the full brunt of a powerful new Hearts side under the management of George Burley. Hibs lost 4–0 as Hearts went on to start the season with eight consecutive league wins.

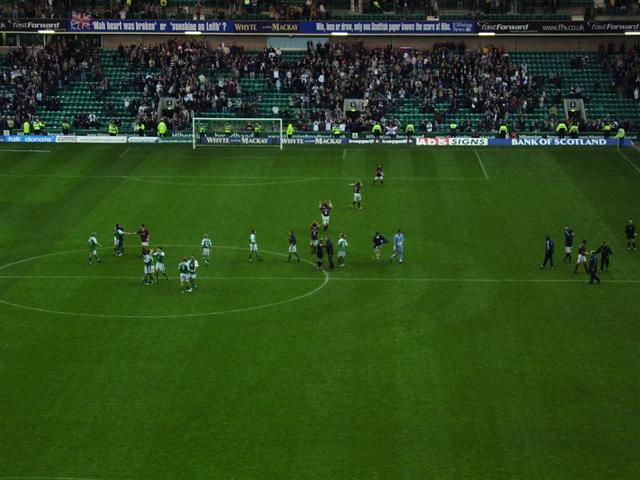
Hibs ended Hearts' unbeaten start to the season on 29 October 2005.

Hibs themselves then went on a run of form, winning four league games in a row. The obvious highlight of this run was a 3–0 win at Ibrox, which was Hibs' first win there since 1995. Ivan Sproule, who had been thinking of returning to his native Northern Ireland, scored all the goals as a second-half substitute for Garry O'Connor. Sproule became the first visiting player to score a hat-trick at Ibrox since Allan Johnston did it for Hearts in 1996, and the first Hibs player to achieve the feat in more than 100 years.

Although Hibs then lost home matches to Celtic and Inverness immediately after their European ties, they then went on another run of victories, this time five in succession. The highlight of this run was the 2–0 Edinburgh derby win against Hearts, which ended their unbeaten start to the season. Despite a home defeat by Falkirk where Hibs had led 2–0, a convincing 2–1 win against Rangers led to media speculation that Hibs could challenge for the league title, which Tony Mowbray played down.

=== Results ===
30 July 2005 SPL	Hibernian	1–1	Dunfermline Athletic	Easter Road, Edinburgh
	O'Connor 74'		Shields 12'	Attendance: 13,010; Referee: Charlie Richmond

7 August 2005 SPL	Heart of Midlothian	4–0	Hibernian	Tynecastle, Edinburgh
	Skacel 12'; Hartley 58' (pen.); Simmons 71'; Mikoliunas 83'			Attendance: 16,459; Referee: Stuart Dougal

13 August 2005 SPL	Hibernian	3–0	Livingston	Easter Road, Edinburgh
	Murphy 40'; Shiels 42'; O'Connor 53'			Attendance: 11,341; Referee: G Turner

20 August 2005 SPL	Falkirk	0–2	Hibernian	Falkirk Stadium, Falkirk
			Brown 36'; Riordan 63' (pen.)	Attendance: 6,268; Referee: Brian Winter

27 August 2005 SPL	Rangers	0–3	Hibernian	Ibrox Stadium, Glasgow
			Sproule 67', 86', 90'	Attendance: 49,754; Referee: Iain Brines

10 September 2005 SPL	Hibernian	2–1	Dundee United	Easter Road, Edinburgh
	O'Connor 18' (pen.); Sproule 70'		Brebner 14'	Attendance: 12,062; Referee: Kenny Clark

18 September 2005 SPL	Hibernian	0–1	Celtic	Easter Road, Edinburgh
			Petrov 5'	Attendance: 15,649; Referee: Craig Thomson

24 September 2005 SPL	Motherwell	1–3	Hibernian	Fir Park, Motherwell
	Foran 83' (pen.)		Beuzelin 20'; Stewart 68'; Riordan 80'	Attendance: 6,461; Referee: Dougie McDonald

2 October 2005 SPL	Hibernian	1–2	Inverness CT	Easter Road, Edinburgh
	Fletcher 82'		Proctor 49'; Wyness 65'	Attendance: 11,683; Referee: Brian Winter

15 October 2005 SPL	Hibernian	4–2	Kilmarnock	Easter Road, Edinburgh
	Caldwell 53'; Beuzelin 61', 80'; Riordan 81'		Ford 7'; Fowler 40'	Attendance: 11,731; Referee: Alan Freeland

22 October 2005 SPL	Aberdeen	0–1	Hibernian	Pittodrie Stadium, Aberdeen
			Riordan 55'	Attendance: 13,375; Referee: Mike McCurry

26 October 2005 SPL	Dunfermline Athletic	1–2	Hibernian	East End Park, Dunfermline
	Mason 87'		O'Connor 48', 83'	Attendance: 6,853; Referee: Craig Mackay

29 October 2005 SPL	Hibernian	2–0	Heart of Midlothian	Easter Road, Edinburgh
	Beuzelin 78'; O'Connor 80'			Attendance: 17,180; Referee: John R. Underhill

5 November 2005 SPL	Livingston	1–2	Hibernian	Almondvale, Livingston
	Strong 42'		Shiels 83'; O'Connor 86'	Attendance: 8,390; Referee: Dougie McDonald

19 November 2005 SPL	Hibernian	2–3	Falkirk	Easter Road, Edinburgh
	Riordan 1', 33'		Duffy 48', 73'; Gow 55'	Attendance: 13,092; Referee: Steve Conroy

27 November 2005 SPL	Hibernian	2–1	Rangers	Easter Road, Edinburgh
	Riordan 18'; O'Connor 25'		Ferguson 59'	Attendance: 16,958; Referee: Stuart Dougal

3 December 2005 SPL	Dundee United	1–0	Hibernian	Tannadice Park, Dundee
	Samuel 61'			Attendance: 7,976; Referee: Brian Winter

10 December 2005 SPL	Celtic	3–2	Hibernian	Celtic Park, Glasgow
	Hartson 40', 65'; Maloney 57'		Beuzelin 47'; Fletcher 53'	Attendance: 59,895; Referee: Kenny Clark

17 December 2005 SPL	Hibernian	2–1	Motherwell	Easter Road, Edinburgh
	Fletcher 3'; Riordan 90'		McDonald 17'	Attendance: 11,926; Referee: Charlie Richmond

26 December 2005 SPL	Inverness CT	2–0	Hibernian	Caley Stadium, Inverness
	Wilson 8'; Dargo 11'			Attendance: 7,017; Referee: Alan Freeland

2 January 2006 SPL	Kilmarnock	2–2	Hibernian	Rugby Park, Kilmarnock
	Naismith 30'; Wales 90'		Hogg 60'; O'Connor 85'	Attendance: 9,224; Referee: Brian Winter

14 January 2006 SPL	Hibernian	1–2	Aberdeen	Easter Road, Edinburgh
	Whittaker 90'		Crawford 4'; Mackie 14'	Attendance: 14,572; Referee: Dougie McDonald

21 January 2006 SPL	Hibernian	3–1	Dunfermline Athletic	Easter Road, Edinburgh
	Riordan 17', 71'; Fletcher 89'		Donnelly 35'	Attendance: 13,316; Referee: Stuart Dougal

28 January 2006 SPL	Heart of Midlothian	4–1	Hibernian	Tynecastle, Edinburgh
	Hartley 27', 44' (pen.); Skacel 41'; Elliot 50'		O'Connor 58'	Attendance: 17,371; Referee: Mike McCurry

8 February 2006 SPL	Hibernian	7–0	Livingston	Easter Road, Edinburgh
	Killen 19'; Riordan 33' (pen.), 64'; O'Connor 48'; Mackay 70' (o.g.); Fletcher 89', 90'			Attendance: 12,170; Referee: Charlie Richmond

11 February 2006 SPL	Falkirk	0–0	Hibernian	Falkirk Stadium, Falkirk
				Attendance: 5,937; Referee: Craig Mackay

18 February 2006 SPL	Rangers	2–0	Hibernian	Ibrox Stadium, Glasgow
	Boyd 40'; Ferguson 74'			Attendance: 49,720; Referee: Iain Brines

4 March 2006 SPL	Hibernian	3–1	Dundee United	Easter Road, Edinburgh
	Riordan 6'; Archibald 25' (o.g.); Killen 33'		Goodwillie 89'	Attendance: 16,266; Referee: Brian Winter

12 March 2006 SPL	Hibernian	1–2	Celtic	Easter Road, Edinburgh
	Riordan 24'		Maloney 36' (pen.); McManus 60'	Attendance: 16,985; Referee: Alan Freeland

18 March 2006 SPL	Motherwell	2–2	Hibernian	Fir Park, Motherwell
	O'Donnell 40'; Craigan 90'		Killen 48'; Glass 78'	Attendance: 6,724; Referee: Mike McCurry

25 March 2006 SPL	Hibernian	0–2	Inverness CT	Easter Road, Edinburgh
			Dods 58'; Wilson 79' (pen.)	Attendance: 12,745; Referee: Mike Ritchie

5 April 2006 SPL	Hibernian	2–1	Kilmarnock	Easter Road, Edinburgh
	Riordan 80'; Dalglish 87'		Wales 19'	Attendance: 10,427; Referee: Calum Murray

8 April 2006 SPL	Aberdeen	1–0	Hibernian	Pittodrie Stadium, Aberdeen
	Severin 21'			Attendance: 14,110; Referee: Iain Brines

16 April 2006 SPL	Celtic	1–1	Hibernian	Celtic Park, Glasgow
	Zurawski 76'		Fletcher 35'	Attendance: 60,047; Referee: Kevin Toner

22 April 2006 SPL	Hibernian	2–1	Heart of Midlothian	Easter Road, Edinburgh
	Riordan 16'; Benjelloun 78'		Bednar 45'	Attendance: 16,654; Referee: Charlie Richmond

29 April 2006 SPL	Aberdeen	4–0	Hibernian	Pittodrie Stadium, Aberdeen
	Crawford 4'; Lovell 30', 54'; Foster 65'			Attendance: 10,490; Referee: Brian Winter

2 May 2006 SPL	Hibernian	1–2	Rangers	Easter Road, Edinburgh
	Hemdani 72' (o.g.)		Boyd 36', 74'	Attendance: 14,933; Referee: Mike McCurry

7 May 2006 SPL	Kilmarnock	3–1	Hibernian	Rugby Park, Kilmarnock
	Naismith 48' (pen.); Greer 72'; Nish 75'		Fletcher 5'	Attendance: 5,732; Referee: Alan Freeland

=== Final table ===
Pos	Team	Pld	W	D	L	GF	GA	GD	Pts	Qualification or relegation (Note: Teams played each other three times (33 matches), before the league split into two groups (the top six and the bottom six) for the last five matches.)
2	Heart of Midlothian	38	22	8	8	71	31	+40	74	Qualification for the Champions League second qualifying round
3	Rangers	38	21	10	7	67	37	+30	73	Qualification for the UEFA Cup first round
4	Hibernian	38	17	5	16	61	56	+5	56	Qualification for the UEFA Intertoto Cup second round (Note: Hibernian qualified for the 2006 UEFA Intertoto Cup by being the highest place applicant for the competition.)
5	Kilmarnock	38	15	10	13	63	64	−1	55	
6	Aberdeen	38	13	15	10	46	40	+6	54	

Source: Scottish Professional Football League
Rules for classification: 1) Points; 2) Goal difference; 3) Goals scored

== UEFA Cup ==
Having finished third in the Scottish Premier League table in the previous season, Hibs qualified directly into the first round proper of the UEFA Cup. They were drawn against Ukrainian Premier League side Dnipro Dnipropetrovsk, with Hibs due to play at home first. The match at Easter Road was a goalless draw, although Hibs hit the woodwork twice. Dnipro took the lead early in the return match thanks to a deflected goal, but Derek Riordan equalised midway through the first half. Hibs conceded two goals before half-time, however, and Dnipro added two more late goals on the counter-attack. This eliminated Hibs at the first hurdle, as they had been in their previous entry in 2001.

=== Results ===
15 September 2005 UEFA Cup	Hibernian	0–0	Dnipro	Easter Road, Edinburgh
				Attendance: 16,861; Referee: Knud Erik Fisker

29 September 2005 UEFA Cup	Dnipro	5–1	Hibernian	Meteor, Dnipropetrovsk
	Nazarenko 1'; Shershun 26'; Shelayev 39' (pen.); Melaschenko 87', 90'		Riordan 24'	Referee: Fritz Stuchlik

== Scottish League Cup ==
As one of the European qualifiers from the previous season, Hibs were given a bye to the last 16 of the competition. In that round they defeated Ayr United 2–1 at Somerset Park. In the quarter-final, Hibs were drawn to play Dunfermline Athletic at East End Park. Dunfermline were struggling in the SPL and had recently lost at home to Hibs in the league, but they turned this form on its head to comfortably beat Hibs 3–0 in the League Cup, ending Hibs' involvement in the competition.

=== Results ===
21 September 2005 Scottish League Cup	Ayr United	1–2	Hibernian	Somerset Park, Ayr
	Wardlaw 86'		Riordan 37', 41'	Attendance: 2,598; Referee: Steve Conroy

8 November 2005 Scottish League Cup	Dunfermline Athletic	3–0	Hibernian	East End Park, Dunfermline
	Burchill 15', 45'; Mason 90'			Attendance: 6,005; Referee: Stuart Dougal

== Scottish Cup ==
Hibs had a straightforward win in the last 32 of the Scottish Cup at home to Arbroath. In the last 16 they were given the daunting task of facing Rangers at Ibrox, although Hibs had won 3–0 at Ibrox earlier in the season thanks to Ivan Sproule's hat-trick. Their preparations for the game were not helped when Rangers made an offer to sign Derek Riordan, Hibs' top scorer, in the week before the match. Hibs rejected Rangers' offer, but accepted offers from foreign clubs that Riordan himself turned down. This transfer activity led Tony Mowbray to decide to leave Riordan on the bench for the match at Ibrox, just as he had done before the previous match at that ground that season. Riordan ended up making a cameo appearance, setting up the third goal for Chris Killen in a second 3–0 win for Hibs at Ibrox, and their third victory in all over Rangers that season. Garry O'Connor and Sproule had scored Hibs' first two goals early in the second half, with Simon Brown gaining some credit for producing an excellent save from Bob Malcolm during the first half.

With Celtic having already been eliminated in a shock defeat by Clyde in the last 32, the Scottish Cup had been opened up for a first winner from outside the Old Firm since Hearts in 1998. The first Scottish Cup Final without an Old Firm club present since 1997 was also guaranteed by those two results. In the quarter-final, Hibs were drawn to play SPL club Falkirk away. Hibs progressed through to the semi-final after a 5–1 victory at the Falkirk Stadium. Hibs were joined in the semi-finals by Edinburgh derby rivals Hearts and Scottish Football League clubs Dundee and Gretna. Gretna beat Dundee 3–0 in the first semi-final, leaving Hibs and Hearts to contest the right to face a Second Division side in a Cup Final where they would be heavy favourite.

The problem for Hibs was that they had been seriously weakened by the time of that semi-final. Derek Riordan had not been sold in the January window, but was suspended for the semi-final after collecting a second yellow card of the competition against Falkirk. Garry O'Connor had been sold to Lokomotiv Moscow straight after the quarter-final win. Chris Killen had failed a late fitness test and Paul Dalglish was cup-tied to Livingston. Midfielders Scott Brown and Michael Stewart were also unavailable due to injury.

These selection problems, particularly in attack, meant that Mowbray drafted in Moroccan youngster Abdessalam Benjelloun for his debut, and also started with youngster Steven Fletcher in attack. He also juggled the other areas of the team by moving Gary Caldwell into midfield and bringing Chris Hogg into defence. The makeshift Hibs side lost the match 4–0 and had Sproule and Gary Smith sent off. Former Hibs player Paul Hartley scored a hat-trick, leaving Mowbray to wonder whether Hibs would have won if the absent players had been available.

=== Results ===
7 January 2006 Scottish Cup	Hibernian	6–0	Arbroath	Easter Road, Edinburgh
	Brown 40', 78'; Sproule 45'; Stewart 63'; O'Connor 74'; Fletcher 85'			Attendance: 10,523; Referee: William Collum

4 February 2006 Scottish Cup	Rangers	0–3	Hibernian	Ibrox Stadium, Glasgow
			O'Connor 50'; Sproule 59'; Killen 78'	Attendance: 40,722; Referee: Stuart Dougal

25 February 2006 Scottish Cup	Falkirk	1–5	Hibernian	Falkirk Stadium, Falkirk
	McBreen 70'		Riordan 9'; O'Connor 64'; Sproule 74'; Caldwell 77'; Fletcher 88'	Attendance: 6,259; Referee: Kenny Clark

2 April 2006 Scottish Cup	Hibernian	0–4	Heart of Midlothian	Hampden Park, Glasgow
			Hartley 28', 59', 88' (pen.); Jankauskas 81'	Attendance: 43,180; Referee: Stuart Dougal

== Transfers ==
Hibs did not make many major changes from the squad that had finished third in the SPL in the previous season. Captain Ian Murray moved to Rangers under freedom of contract, while Hibs signed Michael Stewart, who had been on loan at Hearts. Tony Mowbray also signed Zbigniew Małkowski to play in goal, as Simon Brown had made some errors towards the end of the previous season.

During the winter, Hibs brought in Chris Killen, Oumar Kondé and Paul Dalglish in an attempt to strengthen a squad that was being stretched by injuries. The only major transfer during the season was the sale of Garry O'Connor to Lokomotiv Moscow at the start of March 2006. This transfer went ahead outside of the normal British transfer windows because the Russian Premier League transfer window was still open. O'Connor's transfer started a trend of Hibs selling players, as Kevin Thomson, Scott Brown, Steven Whittaker and David Murphy all moved for fees in excess of £1.5M over the course of the next two years.

=== Players in ===
Player	From	Fee
(Scotland) Michael Stewart	Manchester United	Free
(Poland) Zbigniew Małkowski	Feyenoord	Free
(Netherlands) Humphrey Rudge	Apollon Limassol	Free
(Switzerland) Oumar Kondé	Hansa Rostock	Free
(New Zealand) Chris Killen	Oldham Athletic	Free
(Scotland) Paul Dalglish	Livingston	Nominal Fee
(Scotland) Andrew McNeil	Southampton	Free

=== Players out ===
Player	To	Fee
(Scotland) Ian Murray	Rangers	Free
(Scotland) Stephen Dobbie	St Johnstone	Free
(Austria) Alen Orman	FC Thun	Free
(Scotland) Garry O'Connor	Lokomotiv Moscow	£1,600,000
(Netherlands) Humphrey Rudge	Roda JC	Free

=== Loans out ===
Player	To
(Scotland) Jay Shields	Berwick Rangers
(Scotland) Jonathan Baillie	Ayr United
(England) Kevin McDonald	Airdrie United
(Northern Ireland) Sam Morrow	Livingston

== Player stats ==
During the 2005–06 season, Hibs used 31 different players in competitive games. The table below shows the number of appearances and goals scored by each player.

No.	Pos	Nat	Player	Total		SPL		Scottish Cup		League Cup		UEFA Cup	
No.	Pos	Nat	Player	Apps	Goals	Apps	Goals	Apps	Goals	Apps	Goals	Apps	Goals
	GK	(England) ENG	Simon Brown	11	0	7	0	3	0	1	0	0	0
	GK	(Poland) POL	Zibi Malkowski	36	0	32	0	1	0	1	0	2	0
	DF	(Scotland) SCO	Gary Caldwell	41	2	34	1	4	1	1	0	2	0
	DF	(England) ENG	Chris Hogg	30	1	23	1	3	0	2	0	2	0
	DF	(Switzerland) SUI	Oumar Kondé	13	0	11	0	2	0	0	0	0	0
	DF	(England) ENG	David Murphy	37	1	30	1	4	0	1	0	2	0
	DF	(Netherlands) NED	Humphrey Rudge	8	0	6	0	0	0	2	0	0	0
	DF	(Scotland) SCO	Jay Shields	7	0	7	0	0	0	0	0	0	0
	DF	(Scotland) SCO	Gary Smith	24	0	20	0	2	0	1	0	1	0
	DF	(Scotland) SCO	Steven Whittaker	40	1	34	1	4	0	0	0	2	0
	MF	(France) FRA	Guillaume Beuzelin	25	5	21	5	0	0	2	0	2	0
	MF	(Scotland) SCO	Scott Brown	24	3	20	1	2	2	1	0	1	0
	MF	(Scotland) SCO	Stephen Glass	34	1	28	1	4	0	1	0	1	0
	MF	(Scotland) SCO	Sean Lynch	2	0	2	0	0	0	0	0	0	0
	MF	(Scotland) SCO	Jamie McCluskey	6	0	3	0	3	0	0	0	0	0
	MF	(England) ENG	Kevin McDonald	3	0	2	0	0	0	1	0	0	0
	MF	(England) ENG	Antonio Murray	1	0	1	0	0	0	0	0	0	0
	MF	(Northern Ireland) NIR	Dean Shiels	20	2	16	2	0	0	2	0	2	0
	MF	(Northern Ireland) NIR	Ivan Sproule	40	7	32	4	4	3	2	0	2	0
	MF	(Scotland) SCO	Lewis Stevenson	1	0	0	0	0	0	1	0	0	0
	MF	(Scotland) SCO	Michael Stewart	30	2	25	1	3	1	0	0	2	0
	MF	(Scotland) SCO	Kevin Thomson	37	0	31	0	3	0	1	0	2	0
	FW	(Morocco) MAR	Abdessalam Benjelloun	6	1	5	1	1	0	0	0	0	0
	FW	(Scotland) SCO	Ross Campbell	1	0	1	0	0	0	0	0	0	0
	FW	(Scotland) SCO	Paul Dalglish	14	2	11	1	0	0	0	0	3	1
	FW	(Scotland) SCO	Steven Fletcher	41	10	34	8	4	2	2	0	1	0
	FW	(New Zealand) NZL	Chris Killen	8	4	7	3	1	1	0	0	0	0
	FW	(Mali) MLI	Amadou Konte	15	0	13	0	1	0	1	0	0	0
	FW	(Northern Ireland) NIR	Sam Morrow	12	0	8	0	1	0	2	0	1	0
	FW	(Scotland) SCO	Garry O'Connor	32	14	26	11	3	3	1	0	2	0
	FW	(Scotland) SCO	Derek Riordan	42	20	36	16	3	1	2	2	1	1

== See also ==
- List of Hibernian F.C. seasons
