= 2004–05 Hibernian F.C. season =

Hibernian
2004–05 season
- Chairman: Ken Lewandowski (until December 2004); Rod Petrie (from December 2004)
- Manager: Tony Mowbray
- SPL: 3rd
- Scottish Cup: Semi
- CIS Cup: Quarter
- Intertoto Cup: R2
- Top goalscorer: League: Riordan, 20; All: Riordan, 23
- Highest home attendance: 17450
- Lowest home attendance: 9344
- Average home league attendance: 12539 (up 3389)

Season 2004–05 was a relative success for Hibernian, as the team performed well in the league, finishing third and qualifying for the UEFA Cup in Tony Mowbray's first season as manager. Hibs lost to league strugglers Dundee United in both cup competitions; 2–1 in a Scottish Cup semi-final, and 2–1 after extra time in the League Cup quarter-final. The season also saw the development of a number of promising young players, particularly strikers Derek Riordan and Garry O'Connor. This relative success came after the club had been disappointingly beaten by FK Vetra in the UEFA Intertoto Cup.

== League season ==
Hibs enjoyed a successful first season under new manager Tony Mowbray, as the club finished 3rd in the league and qualified for the next season's UEFA Cup competition. Hibs were pushed for third place by Aberdeen and only clinched the position on the final day of the season. The final day match was against Rangers, who needed to win to have a chance of winning the championship, while Hibs needed to avoid a heavy defeat to prevent Aberdeen overtaking them on goal difference. Rangers took a 1–0 lead after 59 minutes, and the later stages of the game were played out without either team chasing a goal as it suited their needs. Highlights of the season included wins at Tynecastle and Celtic Park, which were big steps towards finishing in such a high position.

=== Results ===
| 7 August 2004 SPL | Hibernian | 0–1 | Kilmarnock | Easter Road, Edinburgh |
| | | | Boyd 73' | Attendance: 10,933; Referee: Freeland |

| 14 August 2004 SPL | Motherwell | 1–2 | Hibernian | Fir Park, Motherwell |
| | O'Donnell 20' | | O'Connor 2', 78' | Attendance: 5,859; Referee: Underhill |

| 21 August 2004 SPL | Rangers | 4–1 | Hibernian | Ibrox Stadium, Glasgow |
| | Arveladze 11'; Prso 15'; Boumsong 58'; Løvenkrands 84' | | Caldwell 35' | Attendance: 48,702; Referee: Clark |

| 28 August 2004 SPL | Hibernian | 4–4 | Dundee | Easter Road, Edinburgh |
| | Shiels 23'; Riordan 41'; O'Connor 46', 50' | | Sutton 7'; Brady 65'; Larsen 79'; Hernandez 90' | Attendance: 9,344; Referee: Richmond |

| 11 September 2004 SPL | Inverness CT | 1–2 | Hibernian | Pittodrie Stadium, Aberdeen |
| | Wilson 37' (pen.) | | Riordan 12', 60' | Attendance: 2,011; Referee: Thomson |

| 19 September 2004 SPL | Hibernian | 2–2 | Celtic | Easter Road, Edinburgh |
| | Balde 8' (o.g.); Murphy 35' | | Camara 34'; Hartson 45' | Attendance: 13,500; Referee: McCurry |

| 25 September 2004 SPL | Aberdeen | 0–1 | Hibernian | Pittodrie Stadium, Aberdeen |
| | | | Riordan 62' | Attendance: 12,137; Referee: McDonald |

| 2 October 2004 SPL | Dunfermline Athletic | 1–1 | Hibernian | East End Park, Dunfermline |
| | Donnelly 86' | | O'Connor 39' | Attendance: 7,290; Referee: Murray |

| 16 October 2004 SPL | Hibernian | 2–0 | Dundee United | Easter Road, Edinburgh |
| | O'Connor 11'; Fletcher 55' | | | Attendance: 9,927; Referee: Ritchie |

| 24 October 2004 SPL | Heart of Midlothian | 2–1 | Hibernian | Tynecastle, Edinburgh |
| | Kisnorbo 15'; Hamill 76' | | Riordan 90' | Attendance: 16,720; Referee: McCurry |

| 27 October 2004 SPL | Hibernian | 2–1 | Livingston | Easter Road, Edinburgh |
| | Beuzelin 9'; Fletcher 23' | | Lilley 65' (pen.) | Attendance: 9,534; Referee: Dallas |

| 30 October 2004 SPL | Kilmarnock | 3–1 | Hibernian | Rugby Park, Kilmarnock |
| | Nish 20', 42'; Dargo 40' | | Shiels 69' | Attendance: 5,959; Referee: Dougal |

| 6 November 2004 SPL | Hibernian | 1–0 | Motherwell | Easter Road, Edinburgh |
| | Murray 79' | | | Attendance: 10,022; Referee: Thomson |

| 14 November 2004 SPL | Hibernian | 0–1 | Rangers | Easter Road, Edinburgh |
| | | | Prso 65' (pen.) | Attendance: 13,829; Referee: Young |

| 20 November 2004 SPL | Dundee | 1–4 | Hibernian | Dens Park, Dundee |
| | Lovell 62' | | Beuzelin 17'; Riordan 43'; Orman 72'; Shiels 88' | Attendance: 5,274; Referee: Toner |

| 27 November 2004 SPL | Hibernian | 2–1 | Inverness CT | Easter Road, Edinburgh |
| | Beuzelin 39'; Riordan 47' | | Juanjo 34' | Attendance: 9,728; Referee: Conroy |

| 4 December 2004 SPL | Celtic | 2–1 | Hibernian | Celtic Park, Glasgow |
| | Hartson 18', 83' | | Caldwell 75' | Attendance: 58,384; Referee: Brines |

| 11 December 2004 SPL | Hibernian | 2–1 | Aberdeen | Easter Road, Edinburgh |
| | Riordan 24'; Glass 64' | | Mackie 37' | Attendance: 13,503; Referee: Rowbotham |

| 18 December 2004 SPL | Hibernian | 2–1 | Dunfermline Athletic | Easter Road, Edinburgh |
| | Glass 66'; Riordan 90' | | Tod 68' | Attendance: 9,859; Referee: Mackay |

| 27 December 2004 SPL | Dundee United | 1–4 | Hibernian | Tannadice Park, Dundee |
| | Scotland 8' | | Riordan 13'; O'Connor 22'; Orman 58'; Morrow 81' | Attendance: 10,152; Referee: Fyfe |

| 2 January 2005 SPL | Hibernian | 1–1 | Heart of Midlothian | Easter Road, Edinburgh |
| | Riordan 24' | | Hartley 55' | Attendance: 17,259; Referee: McDonald |

| 15 January 2005 SPL | Livingston | 0–2 | Hibernian | Almondvale, Livingston |
| | | | O'Connor 53'; Riordan 74' | Attendance: 6,788; Referee: McCurry |

| 22 January 2005 SPL | Hibernian | 3–0 | Kilmarnock | Easter Road, Edinburgh |
| | Riordan 30', 34', 52' | | | Attendance: 12,660; Referee: Dallas |

| 12 February 2005 SPL | Rangers | 3–0 | Hibernian | Ibrox Stadium, Glasgow |
| | Prso 35', 50'; Buffel 61' | | | Attendance: 50,143; Referee: Thomson |

| 15 February 2005 SPL | Motherwell | 1–1 | Hibernian | Fir Park, Motherwell |
| | Craigan 26' | | Riordan 66' (pen.) | Attendance: 7,453; Referee: Clark |

| 19 February 2005 SPL | Hibernian | 4–0 | Dundee | Easter Road, Edinburgh |
| | O'Connor 27', 77'; Whittaker 47'; Fletcher 76' | | | Attendance: 10,938; Referee: Freeland |

| 2 March 2005 SPL | Inverness CT | 3–0 | Hibernian | Caledonian Stadium, Inverness |
| | Juanjo 39'; Brewster 50'; Wilson 77' | | | Attendance: 4,443; Referee: Underhill |

| 6 March 2005 SPL | Hibernian | 1–3 | Celtic | Easter Road, Edinburgh |
| | Beuzelin 90' | | Petrov 5'; Hartson 31'; Bellamy 69' | Attendance: 15,787; Referee: Clark |

| 12 March 2005 SPL | Aberdeen | 3–0 | Hibernian | Pittodrie Stadium, Aberdeen |
| | Anderson 12'; Whelan 13'; Mackie 85' (pen.) | | | Attendance: 14,465; Referee: Toner |

| 19 March 2005 SPL | Dunfermline Athletic | 1–4 | Hibernian | East End Park, Dunfermline |
| | Nicholson 43' | | Riordan 66', 81'; Fletcher 69', 75' | Attendance: 7,204; Referee: Dallas |

| 2 April 2005 SPL | Hibernian | 3–2 | Dundee United | Easter Road, Edinburgh |
| | Shiels 35'; O'Connor 69'; Smith 90' | | McIntyre 63'; Scotland 77' | Attendance: 11,058; Referee: Underhill |

| 13 April 2005 SPL | Heart of Midlothian | 1–2 | Hibernian | Tynecastle, Edinburgh |
| | Miller 40' | | O'Connor 68'; Shiels 73' | Attendance: 17,676; Referee: Rowbotham |

| 16 April 2005 SPL | Hibernian | 0–3 | Livingston | Easter Road, Edinburgh |
| | | | Lilley 49'; Kachloul 61'; O'Brien 87' | Attendance: 11,047; Referee: Mackay |

| 23 April 2005 SPL | Hibernian | 2–2 | Heart of Midlothian | Easter Road, Edinburgh |
| | O'Connor 8'; Riordan 63' | | Miller 23'; Webster 88' | Attendance: 16,620; Referee: McCurry |

| 30 April 2005 SPL | Celtic | 1–3 | Hibernian | Celtic Park, Glasgow |
| | Beattie 59' | | O'Connor 7'; Sproule 79'; Brown 81' | Attendance: 58,322; Referee: Clark |

| 7 May 2005 SPL | Motherwell | 2–2 | Hibernian | Fir Park, Motherwell |
| | Craigan 16', 49' | | Caldwell 81'; Konte 90' | Attendance: 8,903; Referee: Mackay |

| 14 May 2005 SPL | Hibernian | 1–2 | Aberdeen | Easter Road, Edinburgh |
| | Riordan 51' | | Mackie 28', 69' | Attendance: 15,288; Referee: Ritchie |

| 22 May 2005 SPL | Hibernian | 0–1 | Rangers | Easter Road, Edinburgh |
| | | | Novo 59' | Attendance: 17,450; Referee: Clark |

=== Final table ===
| Pos | Team | Pld | W | D | L | GF | GA | GD | Pts | Qualification or relegation (Note: Teams played each other three times (33 matches), before the league split into two groups (the top six and the bottom six) for the last five matches.) |
|---|---|---|---|---|---|---|---|---|---|---|
| 1 | Rangers (C) | 38 | 29 | 6 | 3 | 78 | 22 | +56 | 93 | Qualification for the Champions League third qualifying round |
| 2 | Celtic | 38 | 30 | 2 | 6 | 85 | 35 | +50 | 92 | Qualification for the Champions League second qualifying round |
| 3 | Hibernian | 38 | 18 | 7 | 13 | 64 | 57 | +7 | 61 | Qualification for the UEFA Cup first round |
| 4 | Aberdeen | 38 | 18 | 7 | 13 | 44 | 39 | +5 | 61 | |
| 5 | Heart of Midlothian | 38 | 13 | 11 | 14 | 43 | 41 | +2 | 50 | |

Source: Scottish Professional Football League
Rules for classification: 1) Points; 2) Goal difference; 3) Goals scored
(C) Champions

== Intertoto Cup ==
Despite having finished in the bottom half of the Scottish Premier League table in the previous season, Hibs volunteered to enter the Intertoto Cup. They were drawn against Lithuanian A Lyga side FK Vetra, with Hibs due to play at home first. New manager Tony Mowbray was faced with only having 12 players available for the first training session of the season, just 12 days before the first match with Vetra.

The first match, which was played in "farcical conditions after a thunderstorm flooded the Easter Road pitch", ended in a 1–1 draw. In the return match, Vetra sat back and allowed Hibs the majority of ball possession, but they were unable to create more than a few goalscoring chances from this. A goal resulting from an error by young goalkeeper Alistair Brown condemned Hibs to defeat. The Edinburgh Evening News described Hibs' participation as "a gamble" that had "backfired"; former Hibs player Stuart Lovell questioned the motives of the Hibs board, and the point of giving short term contracts to players just to play in the matches against Vetra.

=== Results ===
| 3 July 2004 UEFA Intertoto Cup | Hibernian | 1–1 | FK Vetra | Easter Road, Edinburgh |
| | O'Connor 77' | | Sasnauskas 63' | Attendance: 8,630; Referee: Tony Asumaa |

| 10 July 2004 UEFA Intertoto Cup | FK Vetra | 1–0 | Hibernian | Zalgiris Stadium, Vilnius |
| | Vasiliauskas 62' | | | Referee: Krzysztof Slupik |

== Scottish League Cup ==
As one of the SPL clubs who had not automatically qualified for European competition, Hibs entered at the last 32 stage (second round) of the competition, in which they defeated Alloa Athletic 4–0 at Easter Road. Hibs were then given a favourable draw against Albion Rovers in the last 16. Despite the underdogs taking a shock lead, Hibs ran out 3–1 winners in a game that was played on a neutral venue (Hamilton). In the quarter-final, Hibs were drawn to play Dundee United at Tannadice. Hibs took the lead through a Derek Riordan goal in the first half and held it for most of the game, but Jim McIntyre scored a late equaliser in normal time, and then scored the winner in extra time.

=== Results ===
| 24 August 2004 Scottish League Cup | Hibernian | 4–0 | Alloa Athletic | Easter Road, Edinburgh |
| | Glass 20'; Orman 48'; Murdock 51'; Riordan 53' | | | Attendance: 5,156; Referee: McCurry |

| 22 September 2004 Scottish League Cup | Albion Rovers | 1–3 | Hibernian | New Douglas Park, Hamilton |
| | McLaren 7' | | Dobbie 42'; Shiels 43'; O'Connor 71' | Attendance: 1,576; Referee: Conroy |

| 9 November 2004 Scottish League Cup | Dundee United | 2–1; AET | Hibernian | Tannadice Park, Dundee |
| | McIntyre 87', 107' | | Riordan 31' | Attendance: 4,865; Referee: Rowbotham |

== Scottish Cup ==
Hibs reached the semi-final of the Scottish Cup, where they met Dundee United. Hibs went into the match as favourites due to the contrasting league form of the two sides; indeed, Hibs had beaten United 3–2 in the league at Easter Road the previous week. Hibs took the lead in the cup match thanks to a Derek Riordan penalty, but then collapsed to a 2–1 defeat, with the winner scored by Jason Scotland.

A curious postscript to the defeat was that Jason Scotland was denied a renewal of a UK work permit the following summer by an expert panel, which included former Hibs players Murdo MacLeod, Tony Higgins, Pat Stanton, Peter Cormack and Tommy McIntyre. The panel was hearing an appeal against a decision to reject the application to renew Scotland's work permit, which had been made automatically because Scotland had only played in two of Trinidad and Tobago's international matches in the preceding two years. The decision forced Scotland to leave United; he signed later that summer for Scottish First Division club St Johnstone, and has subsequently played in the Premier League for Wigan Athletic.

=== Results ===
| 8 January 2005 Scottish Cup | Hibernian | 2–0 | Dundee | Easter Road, Edinburgh |
| | Whittaker 76'; Morrow 87' | | | Attendance: 9,706; Referee: Brines |

| 5 February 2005 Scottish Cup | Hibernian | 4–0 | Brechin City | Easter Road, Edinburgh |
| | Morrow 24'; O'Connor 32', 57'; Caldwell 63' | | | Attendance: 13,563; Referee: McCurry |

| 26 February 2005 Scottish Cup | Hibernian | 2–0 | St Mirren | Easter Road, Edinburgh |
| | Brown 45'; O'Connor 72' | | | Attendance: 15,195; Referee: Young |

| 9 April 2005 Scottish Cup | Dundee United | 2–1 | Hibernian | Hampden Park, Glasgow |
| | McIntyre 73'; Scotland 76' | | Riordan 58' (pen.) | Attendance: 27,271; Referee: McCurry |

== Transfers ==
=== Players in ===
| Player | From | Fee |
|---|---|---|
| (England) Simon Brown | Colchester United | Free |
| (Northern Ireland) Sam Morrow | Ipswich Town | Free |
| (France) Guillaume Beuzelin | Le Havre AC | Free |
| (England) Mark Venus | Cambridge United | Free |
| (Northern Ireland) Dean Shiels | Arsenal | Free |
| (England) David Murphy | Middlesbrough | Free |
| (England) Antonio Murray | Ipswich Town | Free |
| (Mali) Amadou Konte | Cambridge United | Free |
| (England) Chris Hogg | Ipswich Town | Free |
| (Northern Ireland) Ivan Sproule | Institute | £5,000 |

=== Players out ===
| Player | To | Fee |
|---|---|---|
| (Germany) Mathias Jack | FC Sachsen Leipzig | Free |
| (Finland) Jarkko Wiss | Tampere United | Free |
| (Scotland) Allan Dempsie | Elgin City | Free |
| (Canada) Paul Fenwick | Retired | Free |
| (Sweden) Daniel Andersson | Helsingborgs IF | Free |
| (France) Mathias Kouo-Doumbé | Plymouth Argyle | Free |
| (France) Yannick Zambernardi | La Louviere | Free |
| (Republic of Ireland) Nick Colgan | Barnsley | Free |
| (England) Roland Edge | Hull City | Free |
| (Scotland) Grant Brebner | Dundee United | Free |
| (Scotland) Tam McManus | Dundee | Free |
| (Northern Ireland) Colin Murdock | Crewe Alexandra | Free |
| (Scotland) Alan Reid | St Mirren | Free |

=== Loans in ===
| Player | From |
|---|---|
| (Grenada) Craig Rocastle | Chelsea |

=== Loans out ===
| Player | To |
|---|---|
| (Scotland) Tam McManus | Boston United |
| (Scotland) Stephen Dobbie | St Johnstone |

== Player stats ==
During the 2004–05 season, Hibs used 32 different players in competitive games. The table below shows the number of appearances and goals scored by each player.

| No. | Pos | Nat | Player | Total | | SPL | | Scottish Cup | | League Cup | | Intertoto Cup | |
| No. | Pos | Nat | Player | Apps | Goals | Apps | Goals | Apps | Goals | Apps | Goals | Apps | Goals |
|---|---|---|---|---|---|---|---|---|---|---|---|---|---|
| | GK | (Scotland) SCO | Alistair Brown | 4 | 0 | 1 | 0 | 0 | 0 | 1 | 0 | 2 | 0 |
| | GK | (England) ENG | Simon Brown | 44 | 0 | 38 | 0 | 4 | 0 | 2 | 0 | 0 | 0 |
| | DF | (Scotland) SCO | Jonathan Baillie | 2 | 0 | 1 | 0 | 0 | 0 | 1 | 0 | 0 | 0 |
| | DF | (Scotland) SCO | Gary Caldwell | 46 | 4 | 37 | 3 | 4 | 1 | 3 | 0 | 2 | 0 |
| | DF | (Northern Ireland) NIR | Colin Murdock | 9 | 1 | 5 | 0 | 0 | 0 | 2 | 1 | 2 | 0 |
| | DF | (England) ENG | David Murphy | 32 | 1 | 27 | 1 | 3 | 0 | 2 | 0 | 0 | 0 |
| | DF | (Scotland) SCO | Ian Murray | 34 | 1 | 29 | 1 | 3 | 0 | 2 | 0 | 0 | 0 |
| | DF | (Scotland) SCO | Alan Reid | 2 | 0 | 0 | 0 | 0 | 0 | 0 | 0 | 2 | 0 |
| | DF | (Scotland) SCO | Jay Shields | 6 | 0 | 6 | 0 | 0 | 0 | 0 | 0 | 0 | 0 |
| | DF | (Scotland) SCO | Gary Smith | 26 | 1 | 20 | 1 | 4 | 0 | 1 | 0 | 1 | 0 |
| | DF | (England) ENG | Mark Venus | 1 | 0 | 0 | 0 | 0 | 0 | 1 | 0 | 0 | 0 |
| | DF | (Scotland) SCO | Steven Whittaker | 45 | 2 | 37 | 1 | 4 | 1 | 2 | 0 | 2 | 0 |
| | MF | (France) FRA | Guillaume Beuzelin | 29 | 4 | 26 | 4 | 1 | 0 | 2 | 0 | 0 | 0 |
| | MF | (Scotland) SCO | Grant Brebner | 4 | 0 | 2 | 0 | 0 | 0 | 0 | 0 | 2 | 0 |
| | MF | (Scotland) SCO | Scott Brown | 24 | 2 | 20 | 1 | 2 | 1 | 0 | 0 | 2 | 0 |
| | MF | (Scotland) SCO | Stephen Glass | 44 | 3 | 36 | 2 | 3 | 0 | 3 | 1 | 2 | 0 |
| | MF | (Scotland) SCO | Jamie McCluskey | 13 | 0 | 10 | 0 | 2 | 0 | 1 | 0 | 0 | 0 |
| | MF | (England) ENG | Kevin McDonald | 3 | 0 | 2 | 0 | 1 | 0 | 0 | 0 | 0 | 0 |
| | MF | (England) ENG | Antonio Murray | 14 | 0 | 12 | 0 | 2 | 0 | 0 | 0 | 0 | 0 |
| | MF | (Scotland) SCO | Kevin Nicol | 4 | 0 | 1 | 0 | 0 | 0 | 1 | 0 | 2 | 0 |
| | MF | (Austria) AUT | Alen Orman | 18 | 3 | 12 | 2 | 2 | 0 | 2 | 1 | 2 | 0 |
| | MF | (Grenada) GRN | Craig Rocastle | 14 | 0 | 13 | 0 | 0 | 0 | 1 | 0 | 0 | 0 |
| | MF | (Northern Ireland) NIR | Dean Shiels | 43 | 6 | 37 | 5 | 3 | 0 | 3 | 1 | 0 | 0 |
| | MF | (Northern Ireland) NIR | Ivan Sproule | 8 | 1 | 7 | 1 | 1 | 0 | 0 | 0 | 0 | 0 |
| | MF | (Scotland) SCO | Kevin Thomson | 4 | 0 | 3 | 0 | 1 | 0 | 0 | 0 | 0 | 0 |
| | FW | (Scotland) SCO | Stephen Dobbie | 12 | 1 | 7 | 0 | 0 | 0 | 3 | 1 | 2 | 0 |
| | FW | (Scotland) SCO | Steven Fletcher | 26 | 5 | 20 | 5 | 4 | 0 | 2 | 0 | 0 | 0 |
| | FW | (Mali) MLI | Amadou Konte | 13 | 1 | 13 | 1 | 0 | 0 | 0 | 0 | 0 | 0 |
| | FW | (Scotland) SCO | Tam McManus | 4 | 0 | 2 | 0 | 0 | 0 | 0 | 0 | 2 | 0 |
| | FW | (Northern Ireland) NIR | Sam Morrow | 29 | 3 | 22 | 1 | 3 | 2 | 2 | 0 | 2 | 0 |
| | FW | (Scotland) SCO | Garry O'Connor | 43 | 19 | 36 | 14 | 4 | 3 | 1 | 1 | 2 | 1 |
| | FW | (Scotland) SCO | Derek Riordan | 44 | 23 | 37 | 20 | 4 | 1 | 3 | 2 | 0 | 0 |

== See also ==
- List of Hibernian F.C. seasons
