= 1986–87 Middlesbrough F.C. season =

Middlesbrough
1986-87 season
- Chairman: Colin Henderson
- Manager: Bruce Rioch
- Football League Third Division: 2nd
- FA Cup: 3rd round
- League Cup: 2nd round
- Top goalscorer: League: Bernie Slaven (17); All: Bernie Slaven (21)
- Highest home attendance: 18,523 v Wigan Athletic; Away: 13,835 v AFC Bournemouth
- Lowest home attendance: 3,690 v Port Vale; Away: 2,788 v Newport County

During the 1986–87 season, Middlesbrough participated in the Football League Third Division following their relegation the previous season. They were promoted back to the Second Division at the end of the season having finished second in the league.

== Team kit and sponsors ==
During the 1986–87 season, Middlesbrough maintained the white band on their home kit from the previous two seasons and were sponsored by Dickens.

Home colours
Away colours

== Season review ==
=== Pre-season panic ===
The financial problems that had been plaguing the club since the early 1980s almost led the club into extinction following their relegation the previous season.

After Alf Duffield's resignation near the end of the previous season, Boro had been operating without a chairman. On 21 May 1986, the worst fears of Middlesbrough fans were realised. Debts believed to be in the region of £2 million meant the club were forced to call in the provisional liquidator. Late in July, the Inland Revenue took the club to court, claiming that it was owed £115,156 in tax arrears and so the judge issued a winding up order. On the second of August, Bruce Rioch and twenty-nine other non-playing staff were sacked by the Official Receiver and the gates of Ayresome Park were padlocked. Some players chose to remain and train under Rioch and coach Colin Todd, while others chose to leave.

Steve Gibson approached the local council, ICI and Graham Fordy of Scottish & Newcastle for help. An advert was placed in The Times for help, and Henry Moszkowicz was one of those who replied. Gibson reached an agreement with former chairman Alf Duffield, who was owed £500,000, that he would wind up the company. Clubs in less serious situations had previously used liquidation to get out of problems, but when it came to Middlesbrough's turn, the Football League showed a lack of support.

The council was unable to meet its £200,000 share of the pot to help the club, meaning Gibson and Moszkowicz had to raise their inputs. Three days before the start of the season, the league introduced a ruling meaning the club had to have £350,000 in working capital and show it could pay all creditors 100 pence in the pound. The death of the club was then announced on Tyne Tees Television.

A meeting with the Football League took place on Friday 22 August. Notes were passed from room to room between the league's representatives and the consortium. Colin Henderson agreed a deal with ICI for a bond, meaning that they would pick up a major part of any subsequent debt, and the consortium put in their £825,000. With ten minutes to spare before the registration deadline, the documents were signed by Graham Fordy, Reg Corbridge and Henry Moszkowicz. In recognition of Henderson's achievements in delivering the bond in a format acceptable to everyone, he was named chairman of Middlesbrough Football & Athletic Company (1986) Ltd., the new company formed by the purchase of Blackplay Ltd., a dead company, off the shelf. Gibson, Fordy, Corbridge and Moszkowicz formed the board. The club had been saved and the deal was announced to the public at the town hall.

== Football League Third Division ==
=== Results ===
Win Draw Loss

Game	Date	Venue	Opponent	Result F–A	Attendance	Boro Goalscorers
1	23 August 1986	H	Port Vale	2–2	3,690	Stephens (2)
2	30 August 1986	A	Wigan	2–0	2,904	Turnbull, Mowbray
3	6 September 1986	H	Bury	3–1	6,499	Stephens (2), Slaven
4	13 September 1986	A	Gillingham	0–0	4,888
5	17 September 1986	A	Bristol Rovers	2–1	3,768	Slaven (2)
6	20 September 1986	H	Chesterfield	2–0	7,633	Mowbray, Laws
7	27 September 1986	A	Fulham	2–2	3,852	Laws, Hamilton
8	30 September 1986	H	Swindon	1–0	9,221	Laws
9	4 October 1986	A	Rotherham	4–1	4,321	Stephens (2), Laws (2)
10	11 October 1986	H	Blackpool	1–3	11,470	Stephens
11	18 October 1986	H	Walsall	3–1	8,349	Stephens (2), Laws
12	21 October 1986	A	Notts County	0–1	4,405
13	25 October 1986	A	Bristol City	2–2	8,800	Slaven, Laws
14	1 November 1986	H	AFC Bournemouth	4–0	10,702	Stephens, Slaven, Hamilton, Ripley
15	4 November 1986	H	Bolton	0–0	10,092
16	8 November 1986	A	Darlington	1–0	9,947	Stephens
17	22 November 1986	A	Newport County	1–0	2,788	Mowbray
18	29 November 1986	H	Chester City	1–2	9,376	Slaven
19	13 December 1986	H	Doncaster	1–0	8,100	Mowbray
20	21 December 1986	A	Brentford	1–0	5,504	Slaven
21	26 December 1986	H	Carlisle	1–0	14,216	Gill
22	27 December 1986	A	Mansfield	1–1	5,042	Proudlock
23	1 January 1987	A	York City	1–3	8,611	Mowbray
24	3 January 1987	H	Newport County	2–0	9,595	Gill, Stephens
25	24 January 1987	A	Bury	3–0	3,485	Slaven (2), Laws (pen)
26	7 February 1987	H	Bristol Rovers	1–0	9,610	Ripley
27	14 February 1987	A	Chesterfield	1–2	4,085	Slaven
28	17 February 1987	A	Port Vale	0–0	3,263
29	21 February 1987	H	Fulham	3–0	9,361	Slaven, Hamilton (2)
30	28 February 1987	A	Swindon	0–1	11,341
31	3 March 1987	A	AFC Bournemouth	1–3	13,835	Slaven
32	7 March 1987	H	Bristol City	1–0	10,220	Mowbray
33	14 March 1987	A	Walsall	0–1	7,332
34	17 March 1987	H	Notts County	2–0	9,845	Stephens, Slaven
35	21 March 1987	A	Blackpool	1–0	7,132	Stephens
36	28 March 1987	H	Rotherham	0–0	9,569
37	5 April 1987	H	Darlington	1–1	11,969	Slaven
38	11 April 1987	A	Bolton	1–0	5,858	Slaven
39	18 April 1987	H	York City	3–1	10,546	Ripley, Stephens, Turnbull
40	20 April 1987	A	Carlisle	1–0	5,993	Pallister
41	25 April 1987	H	Brentford	2–0	9,942	Slaven, Turnbull
42	28 April 1987	H	Gillingham	3–0	11,937	Stephens, Slaven, Turnbull
43	2 May 1987	A	Chester City	2–1	3,788	Mowbray, Hamilton
44	4 May 1987	H	Mansfield	1–0	13,543	Hamilton (pen)
45	6 May 1987	H	Wigan	0–0	18,523
46	9 May 1987	A	Doncaster	2–0	3,556	Hamilton, Ripley

=== League table ===
Pos	Team	Pld	W	D	L	GF	GA	GD	Pts	Promotion or relegation
1	Bournemouth (C, P)	46	29	10	7	76	40	+36	97	Promotion to the Second Division
2	Middlesbrough (P)	46	28	10	8	67	30	+37	94	Promotion to the Second Division
3	Swindon Town (O, P)	46	25	12	9	77	47	+30	87	Qualification for the Third Division play-offs
4	Wigan Athletic	46	25	10	11	83	60	+23	85	Qualification for the Third Division play-offs
5	Gillingham	46	23	9	14	65	48	+17	78	Qualification for the Third Division play-offs

(C) Champions; (O) Play-off winners; (P) Promoted

== Cup Reviews ==
=== League Cup ===
Win Draw Loss

Round	Date	Venue	Opponent	Result F–A	Attendance	Boro Goalscorers
1R 1st Leg		A	Hartlepool	1–1	2,356	Slaven
1R 2nd Leg		H	Hartlepool	2–0 (3–1 agg)	7,735	Ripley, Hamilton
2R 1st Leg		H	Birmingham	2–2	9,412	Stephens, Ripley
2R 2nd Leg		A	Birmingham	2–3 (4–5 agg)	4,987	Laws (2) (1 pen)

=== FA Cup ===
Round	Date	Venue	Opponent	Result F–A	Attendance	Boro Goalscorers
1R	15 November 1986	H	Blackpool	3–0	11,205	Bernie Slaven (3)
2R	7 December 1986	A	Notts County	1–0	7,415	Hamilton
3	10 January 1987	H	Preston	0–1	15,458

== Squad ==
=== Senior squad ===
The following are all the players who were involved the Middlesbrough F.C. first team at some point during the 1986-87 season. Note: Flags indicate national team as defined under FIFA eligibility rules; some limited exceptions apply. Players may hold more than one non-FIFA nationality.

Pos.	Nation	Player
GK	ENG	Stephen Pears
GK	ENG	Kevin Carr
GK	ENG	Peter Flear
DF	ENG	Colin Cooper
DF	SCO	Ronnie Coyle (loan)
DF	IRL	Alan Kernaghan
DF	ENG	Gary Pallister
MF	ENG	Gary Gill
MF	SCO	Gary Hamilton
MF	ENG	Paul Kerr
FW	ENG	Peter Duffield
FW	ENG	David Hodgson (loan)

Pos.	Nation	Player
DF	ENG	Brian Laws
DF	ENG	Tony Mowbray
DF	ENG	Gary Parkinson
FW	ENG	Paul Proudlock
MF	ENG	Stuart Ripley
MF	ENG	Gary Rowell
FW	IRL	Bernie Slaven
MF	ENG	Steve Spriggs (loan)
FW	ENG	Archie Stephens
FW	ENG	Lee Turnbull

=== Coaching staff ===
- Manager: Bruce Rioch
- Assistant manager: Colin Todd

== Transfers ==
Players Out
Mitch Cook to Scarborough free
Gary Rowell to Brighton and Hove Albion free
David Currie to Darlington free
Peter Beagrie to Sheffield United £37,500 (tribunal)
Tony McAndrew to Darlington free
David Mills to Darlington free
Don O'Riordan to Grimsby Town free
Tony Hall released
Irving Nattrass retired

Players In
Paul Proudlock from South Bank £2,000
Paul Kerr from Aston Villa £35,000
Ronnie Coyle from Celtic loan
David Hodgson from Norwich City loan
Steve Spriggs from Cambridge United loan
Kevin Carr from Newcastle non contract
