= Arthur Stevens =

Arthur Stevens may refer to:

- Arthur Stevens (Australian footballer) (1899–1953), Australian rules footballer for Footscray
- Arthur Stevens (English footballer) (1921–2007), association footballer for Fulham
- Arthur Edwin Stevens (1905–1995), Welsh inventor

== See also ==
- Arthur Stephens, footballer
