= Colin Cooper =

English footballer (born 1967)

Personal information
- Full name: Colin Terence Cooper
- Date of birth: 28 February 1967 (age 59)
- Place of birth: Durham, England
- Height: 5 ft 10 in (1.78 m)
- Position: Defender

Senior career*
| Years | Team | Apps | (Gls) |
| 1984–1991 | Middlesbrough | 188 | (6) |
| 1991–1993 | Millwall | 77 | (6) |
| 1993–1998 | Nottingham Forest | 180 | (20) |
| 1998–2006 | Middlesbrough | 158 | (4) |
| 2004 | → Sunderland (loan) | 3 | (0) |
| Total | | 606 | (36) |

International career
| 1988–1989 | England U21 | 8 | (0) |
| 1995 | England | 2 | (0) |

Managerial career
- 2009: Middlesbrough (caretaker)
- 2011: Bradford City (caretaker)
- 2013–2014: Hartlepool United
- * Club domestic league appearances and goals

Colin Terence Cooper (born 28 February 1967) is an English football manager and former professional footballer.

As a player, he was a defender who notably played in the Premier League for Nottingham Forest and Middlesbrough. He played over 500 league appearances combined for both clubs. He also played in the Football League for both Millwall and Sunderland. He was capped twice by England, having previously earned eight games at U21 level.

Following retirement, he moved into coaching and worked in the Middlesbrough academy, later progressing into the first team before taking charge on a temporary basis in 2009. He later moving to Bradford City as assistant manager and then in 2013 becoming manager of Hartlepool United. In 2016 he joined the coaching staff of the England U21 setup under former teammate Gareth Southgate.

== Playing career ==
He played as a centre back, but was equally useful at full-back. He spent the first seven years of his professional career contracted to Middlesbrough, making 188 league appearances and scoring six league goals in the process. During this time, he helped Middlesbrough through liquidation in 1986.

In the summer of 1991, he was transferred to Division Two side Millwall for the sum of £300,000 spending two successful seasons at The Den.

After impressing several big name clubs, he decided to move to Nottingham Forest in 1993 for £1,700,000. It was at Forest where Colin played the best football of his career, his form earning him two England caps in 1995 against Sweden and Brazil.

After experiencing the joys of two promotions and the heart-break of a relegation, "Super Coops" was re-purchased by his first club, Middlesbrough, in a £2,500,000 deal. Many people questioned the signing of the stalwart from Nottingham Forest, but Colin proved to many people that he was more than capable of playing Premier League football. He maintained a consistent level of play throughout the seven years that he spent with Middlesbrough, and could always be relied upon to do a job. He almost gave up the game in 2002 after his son, Finlay, died in an accident at the family home just hours after their victory over Manchester United in the FA Cup. In 2003–04, he spent some time on loan with Sunderland. Cooper was part of Middlesbrough's 2004 League Cup-winning team. Despite not making the squad for the final he appeared in the earlier rounds.

In 2005, Cooper was awarded a one-year contract extension, which saw him play at the age of 39. His final season with Middlesbrough, 2005–06, saw Boro reach the 2006 UEFA Cup Final. However, he made just one appearance all campaign, coming on as a late substitute on the last day of the season against Fulham.

== International career ==
Cooper made his England international debut in a 3–3 draw against Sweden. He gained two caps for the England national team and made eight caps for the Under-21 side where he finished runners-up with the U21s in the 1988 Tournoi Espoirs de Toulon tournament.

== Managerial career ==
After he retired from playing, in June 2006, Cooper was officially given a job with the Middlesbrough coaching staff, as the Reserve team coach. Following Steve Round's departure from the club in December 2006, Cooper was promoted to a more active role with the first team. Following the departure of Malcolm Crosby on 17 June 2009, Cooper was promoted to assistant manager at Middlesbrough. On 22 October 2009, following the departure of manager Gareth Southgate, Cooper was appointed caretaker manager at Middlesbrough. However, he was only employed in this position for four days, as Gordon Strachan was announced as the new manager on 26 October. Cooper's solitary match in charge was a 2–2 draw with Preston North End on 24 October 2009. In May 2010, Cooper was relieved of all duties at Middlesbrough by Strachan.

On 9 March 2011, Cooper was appointed as assistant to interim manager Peter Jackson at League Two side Bradford City. Jackson was subsequently appointed full-time manager on 25 May 2011, but he resigned on 25 August 2011, resulting in Cooper taking over as caretaker manager. winning his first game 4–2 against Barnet. Phil Parkinson was appointed as Jackson's permanent successor, and on 8 September 2011, Cooper left Bradford to rejoin Middlesbrough and take up a coaching role with Middlesbrough's under-18 side.

On 24 May 2013, he became manager at Football League Two side Hartlepool United, replacing John Hughes, who had been sacked the previous month. He named fellow ex-Middlesbrough player Craig Hignett as his assistant manager. After winning four out of five league games in October, Cooper won the Sky Bet League Two Manager of the Month Award.

Cooper resigned as Hartlepool United manager on 4 October 2014, after a 3–0 home defeat by Carlisle United, which left the club at the bottom of the League Two table.

In April 2016, Cooper joined Gareth Southgate's coaching staff with the England U21s.

== Media work ==
Cooper was a regular guest on the ITV late night football review programme Soccer Night, which was hosted by Roger Tames. During this programme, three legendary figures, representing one of each of the North-East's top three clubs (Middlesbrough, Sunderland, and Newcastle United), come to the studio and discuss recent footballing events.

== Personal life ==
In 2006, Colin and his wife Julie, formed the charity the Finlay Cooper Fund, named after his son who died in a tragic accident in 2002, which raises money for children's causes. In 2013, Colin and 12 others (which included Craig Hignett and Jeff Stelling) climbed Mount Kilimanjaro for charity; the climb raised £100,000.

== Career statistics ==
=== Player ===
Statistics for league appearances only

Appearances and goals by club, season and competition
| Club | Season | League | | |
| Club | Season | Division | Apps | Goals |
|---|---|---|---|---|
| Middlesbrough | 1984–85 | Second Division | 0 | 0 |
| Middlesbrough | 1985–86 | Second Division | 11 | 0 |
| Middlesbrough | 1986–87 | Third Division | 46 | 0 |
| Middlesbrough | 1987–88 | Second Division | 43 | 2 |
| Middlesbrough | 1988–89 | First Division | 35 | 2 |
| Middlesbrough | 1989–90 | Second Division | 21 | 2 |
| Middlesbrough | 1990–91 | Second Division | 32 | 0 |
| Middlesbrough | Total | | 188 | 6 |
| Millwall | 1991–92 | Second Division | 36 | 2 |
| Millwall | 1992–93 | First Division | 41 | 4 |
| Millwall | Total | | 77 | 6 |
| Nottingham Forest | 1993–94 | First Division | 37 | 7 |
| Nottingham Forest | 1994–95 | Premier League | 35 | 1 |
| Nottingham Forest | 1995–96 | Premier League | 37 | 5 |
| Nottingham Forest | 1996–97 | Premier League | 36 | 2 |
| Nottingham Forest | 1997–98 | First Division | 35 | 5 |
| Nottingham Forest | Total | | 180 | 20 |
| Middlesbrough | 1998–99 | Premier League | 32 | 1 |
| Middlesbrough | 1999–2000 | Premier League | 26 | 0 |
| Middlesbrough | 2000–01 | Premier League | 27 | 1 |
| Middlesbrough | 2001–02 | Premier League | 18 | 2 |
| Middlesbrough | 2002–03 | Premier League | 20 | 0 |
| Middlesbrough | 2003–04 | Premier League | 19 | 0 |
| Middlesbrough | 2004–05 | Premier League | 15 | 0 |
| Middlesbrough | 2005–06 | Premier League | 1 | 0 |
| Middlesbrough | Total | | 158 | 4 |
| Sunderland (loan) | 2003–04 | First Division | 3 | 0 |
| Career total | | | 606 | 36 |

=== Manager ===
As of 4 October 2014

Managerial record by team and tenure
| Team | From | To | Record | | | | |
| Team | From | To | P | W | D | L | Win % |
|---|---|---|---|---|---|---|---|
| Middlesbrough (caretaker) | 20 October 2009 | 26 October 2009 | 2 | 1 | 1 | 0 | 50.0 |
| Bradford City (caretaker) | 25 August 2011 | 29 August 2011 | 1 | 1 | 0 | 0 | 100.0 |
| Hartlepool United | 24 May 2013 | 4 October 2014 | 65 | 19 | 14 | 32 | 29.2 |
| Total | | | 68 | 21 | 15 | 32 | 30.9 |

== Honours ==
=== Player ===
Middlesbrough

- Football League Second Division play-offs: 1988
- Football League Third Division runner-up: 1986–87
- Football League Cup: 2003–04
- Full Members' Cup runner-up: 1989–90

Nottingham Forest

- Football League First Division: 1997–98; runner-up: 1993–94

England U21s

- Tournoi Espoirs de Toulon runner-up: 1988

Individual

- PFA Team of the Year: 1992–93 First Division, 1993–94 First Division, 1997–98 First Division

=== Manager ===
Individual

- Football League Two Manager of the Month: October 2013
