= Middlesbrough F.C. survival from liquidation =

English football club's 1986 recovery

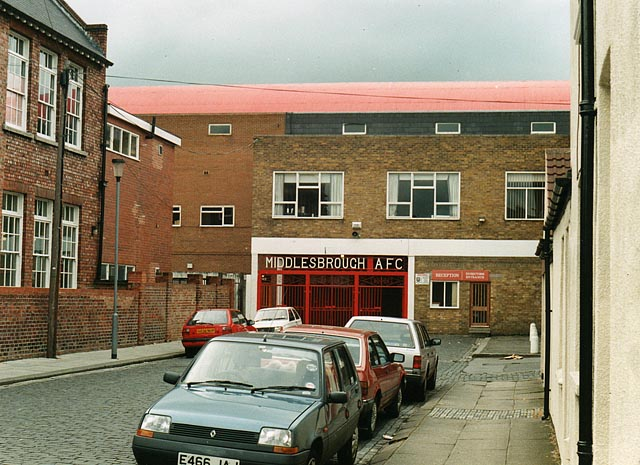
The main entrance to Ayresome Park. In May 1986, the gates were padlocked and non playing staff sacked by the Official Receiver as the club entered liquidation.

By the end of the 1984-1985 season, Middlesbrough Football Club—first established in 1876—found itself in serious economic peril. Over that season the club had had to take on debts amounting to almost £2 million, including having to borrow £30,000 Professional Footballers' Association just to pay players' wages. The club was announced to be wound up, and was only saved by a consortium headed by Steve Gibson. The documents to register the club for the next season were submitted minutes before the deadline.

== Lead-up ==
At the start of the 1981-82 season, Middlesbrough were in the Football League First Division. The season ended with them finishing bottom of the league and being relegated. It has been claimed that the team had been severely weakened by the sales of star players such as Craig Johnston, David Armstrong and Mark Proctor. Dutch midfielder Heini Otto had, however, successfully integrated into the team.

In February of that year, Boro chairman Charles Amer and his son Kevin, who was a director, both resigned from the board. George Kitching moved in to take over as chairman but it was his unenviable task (at the club's ninetieth annual meeting in December 1982) to report to shareholders that the club had suffered an annual loss of £307,718.

The Manager Bobby Murdoch was asked to resign in September 1982 after poor performances, and Harold Shepherdson was appointed caretaker until a permanent replacement could be installed. After only 6 months as chairman, Kitching resigned and Mike McCullagh took over, with Keith Varley as vice-chairman. The board appointed Malcolm Allison as full-time manager. Allison took the team to a point away from home in his first game in charge but the team only went on to finish 16th.

The next season, things continued to decline. Boro's form was poor in both the League and cup (although they were never in serious danger of relegation), but more worryingly for the board the club was getting into serious financial problems. Malcolm Allison was being pressured into off-loading star players to keep the club afloat. Late in March 1984, Allison sensationally claimed that it was "better for the club to die than to linger slowly on its deathbed", a quote which was swiftly followed by his sacking. Jack Charlton guided the club through the rest of the season, assisted by Willie Maddren, and they finished 17th, a place down on the previous season.

Steve Gibson joined the board as a director in November 1984, and Maddren, now appointed as permanent manager, miraculously guided the club to safety in 1984-85. On the last day of the season, the team needed three points to survive, and the team delivered a 2–0 win, leaving the team 19th.

McCullagh resigned as chairman and Alf Duffield was installed as chairman. He made the right noises in the press and pleased the fans initially. Middlesbrough desperately needed capital but the opinions of board members were split over the idea to raise £1 million by a public share issue. Gibson realised Duffield didn't have control over the shareholders but he tried to do his best for the club.

== 1986 ==
With Maddren struggling with results, coach Bruce Rioch was brought in to assist him. However, only six weeks later, Maddren left and Rioch took over full-time.

In April 1986, the club had to borrow £30,000 from the Professional Footballers' Association to pay players' wages and things were looking bad. Rioch's strict disciplinary methods had upset senior players and he instead relied on youth. Tensions between Rioch and chairman Duffield grew during the final four weeks of the season and, following an allegedly mighty row during a meeting over dinner, Duffield resigned.

Duffield had lent money to the club himself or arranged bank loans which he had secured. Unfortunately, instead of giving the club financial stability, they were only getting further and further into debt. Gibson tried to keep the problems "in house" but information was leaked to the press about the difficulties soon after.

On the pitch, Boro tumbled down into the Third Division for only the second time in their history, after a loss on the final day of the season. Debts were discovered to be bigger than initially thought. £100,000 was still owed to former chairman Charles Amer for construction of the sports hall at Ayresome Park eight years earlier, money for which Amer was planning steps to retrieve.

On 21 May 1986, with debts amounting to almost £2 million, the club called in the provisional liquidator. In late July, the Inland Revenue took the club to court. The club owed £115,156 in tax and the judge issued a winding up order. On the second of August, Rioch and twenty-nine other non-playing staff were sacked and the gates to Ayresome Park were padlocked. Some players chose to remain and train under Rioch and coach Colin Todd, while others such as Don O'Riordan and Peter Beagrie (since nicknamed 'Judas' because of this) chose to leave.

Gibson's haulage company, Bulkhaul Limited, was expanding and doing well, but he was still relatively new to the business and lacked big time credibility. In order to help salvage the situation, Gibson approached the council for help, who in turn approached ICI. He also contacted Graham Fordy of Scottish & Newcastle. An advert was placed in The Times for help, and Henry Moszkowicz was one of those who replied. The consortium realised the structure of the club had to change and so Gibson approached the board asking for total executive powers. He got his wish, after a heated argument. Gibson reached an agreement with Duffield, who was owed £500,000, that he would wind up the company. Clubs in less serious situations had previously used liquidation to get out of problems, but when it came to Middlesbrough's turn, the Football League showed a lack of support and Gibson claimed they wanted to “crucify a football club, and this small club in the north-east was the one they picked on.”

A problem arose when the council was unable to meet its £200,000 share of the pot, meaning Gibson and Moszkowicz had to raise their inputs. Things continued to work against them. Three days before the start of the season, the league introduced a ruling meaning the club had to have £350,000 in working capital and show it could pay all creditors 100 pence in the pound. The death of the club was then announced on Tyne Tees Television.

A meeting with the Football League took place on Friday 22 August. Notes were passed from room to room between the league's representatives and the consortium. Colin Henderson agreed a deal with ICI for a bond, meaning that they would pick up a major part of any subsequent debt, and the consortium put in their £825,000. With ten minutes to spare before the registration deadline, the documents were signed by Graham Fordy, Reg Corbridge and Henry Moszkowicz. In recognition of Henderson's achievements in delivering the bond in a format acceptable to everyone, he was named chairman of Middlesbrough Football & Athletic Company (1986) Ltd., the new company formed by the purchase of Blackplay Ltd., a dead company, off the shelf. Gibson, Fordy, Corbridge and Moszkowicz formed the board. The club had been saved and the deal was announced to the public at the town hall.

== Aftermath ==
Legal matters continued throughout the 1986–87 season as people came forward to claim old debts, but this was overshadowed by the achievements of Rioch's side on the pitch.

The side, which had been relegated the season before, finished second in the table, regaining a place in the Second Division. The following season, the club finished third in the place, winning promotion to the First Division by the play-offs. Although the club would be relegated back to the second flight after the next season, the recovery from such a precarious situation surprised everyone in the football world.

== See also ==
- History of Middlesbrough F.C.
- Middlesbrough F.C. season 1986-87
