= Humphrey Rudge =

Dutch footballer (born 1977)

Personal information
- Full name: Humphrey Rudge Jr.
- Date of birth: 15 August 1977 (age 49)
- Place of birth: Geleen, Netherlands
- Height: 1.86 m (6 ft 1 in)
- Position: Defender

Youth career
- –1989: Quick '08
- 1989–1996: Roda JC

Senior career*
Years	Team	Apps	(Gls)
1996–2005	Roda JC	90	(2)
2001	→ Sparta (loan)	12	(0)
2004	→ VVV (loan)	13	(0)
2005	Apollon Limassol	4	(0)
2005–2006	Hibernian	6	(0)
2006–2007	Roda JC	5	(2)
2007	RKC Waalwijk	4	(0)
Total		134	(4)

International career
1999–2000	Netherlands U21	9	(0)

Managerial career
- 2009–2013: Sunderland (scout)
- 2013–: PSV (scout)
- * Club domestic league appearances and goals

Humphrey Rudge Jr. (born 15 August 1977) is a Dutch former professional footballer who played as a defender.

== Football career ==
He made his debut as part of the Roda JC squad in the 1996–97 season. As part of the team, he won two KNVB Cup finals, in 1996–97 and 1999–2000, respectively. He also played for Sparta, VVV, Apollon Limassol and Hibernian, before rejoining Roda JC and ending his career at RKC Waalwijk. Rudge retired from professional football in June 2009 due to recurring injuries in his knees.

With the Netherlands under-21 team, he participated in the 2000 UEFA European Under-21 Championship.

In September 2009, Rudge was appointed scout for English club Sunderland. In January 2013, he continued his career as a scout for PSV.

== Personal life ==
His father Humphrey Rudge Sr. arrived in the Netherlands from Suriname in 1957 alongside teammates Puck Eliazer and Eddy Green to play football for Fortuna '54 in Geleen.

== Honours ==
Roda JC

- KNVB Cup: 1996–97, 1999–2000
- Johan Cruyff Shield runner-up: 2000
