= Gary Gill =

English footballer

Personal information
- Full name: Gary Gill
- Date of birth: 28 November 1964 (age 61)
- Place of birth: Middlesbrough, England
- Height: 5 ft 10 in (1.78 m)
- Position: Midfielder

Senior career*
| Years | Team | Apps | (Gls) |
| 1983–1989 | Middlesbrough | 77 | (2) |
| 1983–1984 | → Hull City (loan) | 1 | (0) |
| 1989–1992 | Darlington | 64 | (9) |
| 1992 | Cardiff City | 6 | (1) |
| Total | | 148 | (12) |

Managerial career
- 2002: Gateshead
- * Club domestic league appearances and goals

Gary Gill (born 28 November 1964) is an English former professional footballer. He began his career playing for his hometown club Middlesbrough, making his professional debut in April 1984. The club endured severe financial trouble during this period but Gill was part of the side that won consecutive promotions in 1987 and 1988 to reach the First Division before suffering a broken leg in 1989. He made just one further appearance for the club before joining Darlington in 1989, following a loan spell with Hull City. He later played for Cardiff City, winning the Welsh Cup in 1992, before retiring at the age of 28 due to injury.

After working as a coach in the United States, Gill joined Gateshead as assistant manager before taking control of the team in February 2002 following the resignation of Paul Proudlock. He resigned from the role eight months later. After a serious car accident left him disabled, he gave up coaching and returned to his former club Middlesbrough as a scout before being made the club's head of UK recruitment.

== Early life ==
Born in Middlesbrough, Gill attended Archibald Primary School, Acklam Whin Primary School and Stainby School as a child. He grew up supporting his hometown club Middlesbrough and attended matches at Ayresome Park with his father.

== Playing career ==
After representing his school and county teams, Gill signed for Middlesbrough as an apprentice at the age of sixteen. After progressing through the club's youth system, he was handed his professional debut in April 1984 by caretaker-manager Jack Charlton, coming on as a substitute during a match against Swansea City. He made his full debut a week later, starting a match against Charlton Athletic, however his appearances for the club were limited as he struggled with injuries, including having two discs removed from his back at the age of nineteen. After a brief loan spell at Hull City, playing one match at the end of the 1983–84 season, he featured in the 1986 squad, helping the club's survival from liquidation during which players were left unpaid for several months. The squad went on to win consecutive promotions, moving from the Third Division to the First Division.

In April 1989, Gill suffered a broken leg during a match against Southampton but carried on playing, stating "The physio then was Tommy Johnson. He knew how desperate I was to stay on the pitch." Johnson gave Gill the magic sponge and told him "it is a battle, run it off." Despite his desire to continue, the injury eventually began causing him severe pain and he was substituted. He returned from injury and played one further match for Middlesbrough against Plymouth Argyle. Gill eventually left Middlesbrough having made 97 appearances in all competitions after falling out with manager Bruce Rioch. He went to play for another local team Darlington who were managed by Gill's former coach at Middlesbrough, Brian Little. After helping the side win promotion into the Football League, he was part of the squad that won the Fourth Division title during the 1990–91 season.

In February 1992, he joined Cardiff City, making his debut in a 1–0 defeat to Scunthorpe United on 14 March 1992. He made five further league appearances, scoring once during a 3–0 victory over Wrexham, and played in the club's 1992 Welsh Cup final victory over Hednesford Town before being released at the end of the season. Gill later commented that he struggled for fitness during his time with Cardiff and persistent injuries led to his retirement from playing after leaving the club at the age of 28.

== Managerial and coaching career ==
Following his retirement, Gill travelled to the United States to take up a position coaching high school students in San Diego. Gill later worked as assistant manager to Paul Proudlock at Gateshead. In February 2002, he was appointed manager of the club following the resignation of Proudlock. Gill attempted to convince Proudlock to remain with the club but accepted the job when he refused. He resigned from his position in October 2002 when he was forced to cut players wages that resulted in him breaking a guarantee he had made to his squad.

Gill later joined BBC Radio Cleveland, replacing his former teammate Paul Kerr providing match commentaries for Middlesbrough matches and was eventually given a regular column for BBC Tees entitled "Gilly's View". He also worked as a buyer for a men's clothing brand and owned the Chadwick's Inn pub in Maltby.

In October 2011, Gill returned to Middlesbrough as a European scout for manager Tony Mowbray in an attempt to widen the club's scouting network. Following Mowbray's sacking, Gill was moved to a new role as head of UK recruitment following the appointment of Aitor Karanka and was placed in charge of opposition scouting and the club's scouting network.

== Personal life ==
In 2002, Gill was seriously injured after being involved in a car accident on the A67 when a van hit another car before colliding with Gill's car. Gill suffered a smashed left knee, a collapsed lung, a broken shoulder and a fractured neck, leaving him permanently disabled after losing full use of his left leg. He later stated that the accident had left him unable to continue his career as a football coach, commenting "I had wanted to become a top coach and I just feel like that opportunity has been taken away from me." The driver of the van was killed and his employer later accepted liability for the accident after it was revealed that he had been working longer hours than the law permits drivers to work.

== Honours ==
Darlington

- Football League Fourth Division: 1990–91

Cardiff City

- Welsh Cup: 1991–92

Individual

- PFA Team of the Year: 1990–91 Fourth Division
