= Tony Mowbray =

English footballer & manager (born 1963)

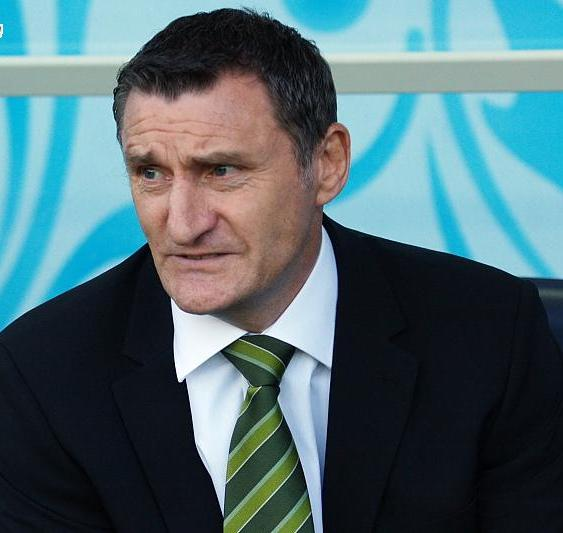
- Mowbray in 2009

Personal information
- Full name: Anthony Mark Mowbray
- Date of birth: 22 November 1963 (age 62)
- Place of birth: Saltburn, England
- Height: 6 ft 1 in (1.85 m)
- Position: Defender

Senior career*
Years	Team	Apps	(Gls)
1982–1991	Middlesbrough	348	(26)
1991–1995	Celtic	77	(5)
1995–2000	Ipswich Town	128	(5)
Total		553	(36)

International career
1989	England B	3	(0)

Managerial career
- 2002: Ipswich Town (caretaker)
- 2004–2006: Hibernian
- 2006–2009: West Bromwich Albion
- 2009–2010: Celtic
- 2010–2013: Middlesbrough
- 2015–2016: Coventry City
- 2017–2022: Blackburn Rovers
- 2022–2023: Sunderland
- 2024: Birmingham City
- 2025: West Bromwich Albion
- 2026: Blackburn Rovers
- * Club domestic league appearances and goals

Anthony Mark Mowbray (born 22 November 1963) is an English football manager and former footballer who was most recently the head coach of EFL Championship club Blackburn Rovers. Mowbray played for Middlesbrough, Celtic and Ipswich Town as a defender.

He began his coaching career with Ipswich Town and took his first managerial job at Scottish Premier League side Hibernian, where he won the Scottish Football Writers' Association Manager of the Year award in his first season. He moved on to West Bromwich Albion in 2006, where he won the Football League Championship in 2008, but then suffered relegation from the Premier League the following year. Mowbray was then appointed as manager of Celtic, but was dismissed after nine months for poor results.

Mowbray was appointed to the role of Middlesbrough manager in October 2010. After a poor start to the 2013–14 season, Mowbray left Middlesbrough in October 2013. Following a spell as manager of Coventry City, he was appointed Blackburn Rovers manager in February 2017. He was unable to prevent Blackburn being relegated to League One, but then won promotion back to the Championship at the first attempt. He left Blackburn at the end of his contract in May 2022 and subsequently had spells with Sunderland and Birmingham City. He was reappointed head coach of West Bromwich Albion in January 2025 but was dismissed three months later in April 2025 after a run of poor results. In June 2026, Mowbray was reappointed head coach of Blackburn Rovers, but stepped back in November 2026 due to health issues.

== Playing career ==
=== Middlesbrough ===
After playing his first match for the club in 1982, Mowbray became captain of Middlesbrough in 1986 when he was just 22 years old. Affectionately known to Boro fans as "Mogga", Mowbray became a legend in Middlesbrough for being a local lad who led the club from liquidation back into the top league of English football within two seasons.

In 2007, Mowbray was placed at number 7 in a chronological list of Middlesbrough legends compiled by local newspaper the Evening Gazette. The Middlesbrough club fanzine Fly Me to the Moon is named after a quote about Mowbray from ex-Middlesbrough manager Bruce Rioch – "If I had to fly to the moon I'd take Tony Mowbray, my captain, with me. He's a magnificent man". In 1991, after 348 appearances for Boro, Mowbray moved to Scottish club Celtic for £1 million.

=== Celtic ===
During his playing career with Celtic, Mowbray's wife Bernadette, a native of Renfrewshire, died of breast cancer. The episode is recalled in Mowbray's book, Kissed by an Angel. It is often asserted that the "huddle" which Celtic players still perform before each match was arranged as a tribute to Bernadette. However, it was merely suggested by Mowbray on a pre-season tour of Germany to bring the squad together at a time of uncertainty.

=== Ipswich Town ===
He later moved on to Ipswich Town, where he played for five years, becoming the team captain. He scored an equalising goal in the 2000 Division One playoff final victory against Barnsley. Ipswich won the match 4–2 and secured promotion to the FA Premier League. This match was both Mowbray's Wembley debut and the last of his playing career.

== Coaching career ==
Once his playing career finished, he moved into coaching, starting as a first-team coach at Ipswich Town. He had a brief spell as caretaker manager of Ipswich, following the dismissal of George Burley and prior to the appointment of Joe Royle.

=== Hibernian ===
In May 2004, Mowbray was appointed manager of Hibernian, replacing Bobby Williamson. He gained much acclaim for the job he did, winning the Scottish Football Writers' Association manager of the year award in his first season. Hibs finished in the top four in the SPL in his only two full seasons in charge, which was the first time since Eddie Turnbull's time as manager that the club had achieved this in the top division in consecutive seasons.

The Hibs team progressed to the later stages of every domestic cup competition during his tenure, and made two appearances in European football. They lost heavily to Dnipro Dnipropetrovsk in the first round of the 2005–06 UEFA Cup and on the away goals rule to OB Odense in the 2006 Intertoto Cup. During mid-2006 Mowbray was interviewed for the vacant managerial position at Ipswich Town, but he rejected this approach. In September 2006 he signed a 12-month rolling deal with Hibs that was due to take effect from July 2007. Just one month later, however, Mowbray moved to West Bromwich Albion.

=== West Bromwich Albion ===
West Bromwich Albion appointed Mowbray as its manager on 13 October 2006. Mowbray faced the task of returning the club to the Premier League after relegation the previous season. Although he managed to turn around the club's poor away form, an indifferent run of results at home towards the end of the season meant that Albion finished fourth in The Championship table behind Sunderland, Birmingham City and Derby County, and faced the Championship play-offs. Despite two victories over rivals Wolverhampton Wanderers in the semi-finals, Albion lost 1–0 to Derby County in the Wembley final.

As a result, during the close season, Mowbray set about restructuring his squad, moving out several of Robson's players for multimillion-pound fees, after press reports of dressing room division.

High-profile players such as Jason Koumas, Diomansy Kamara and Curtis Davies were sold to Premier League clubs for large fees, in addition to the departures of Paul McShane, Nathan Ellington, Darren Carter and Steve Watson. Mowbray replaced them by signing a total of 14 permanent and loan players in the summer transfer window, making an overall profit in the process. His most expensive signings were Chris Brunt from Sheffield Wednesday for £3 million, Leon Barnett from Luton Town for £2.5 million, and James Morrison from Middlesbrough for £1.5 million.

Despite the large changes in his squad, Mowbray won the Championship Manager of the Month award in September 2007, after Albion gained 13 out of the maximum 15 points and climbed to second in the Division.

At the start of 2008, Mowbray's young Albion team topped the table, receiving growing plaudits from the media and supporters alike for their attractive brand of attacking one touch passing football, a reflection of Mowbray's footballing philosophy.

Mowbray guided West Brom to the EFL Championship title, meaning promotion to the Premier League and reached the semi-final of the FA Cup. The semi-final, the first to be played at the new Wembley Stadium, featured West Brom against Portsmouth, the only remaining Premier League team left in the FA Cup. Portsmouth won the match 1–0 with the only goal of the game coming from Kanu. Mowbray won the Championship manager of the month award for April, as well as the League Managers Association manager of the year award.

After a poor 2008–09 season, West Bromwich were relegated from the Premier League, finishing 20th. Mowbray was still thought highly of by the fans, however, and this was evidenced by them wearing Mowbray masks at their last game of the season. Mowbray left the club for Celtic shortly afterwards.

=== Celtic ===
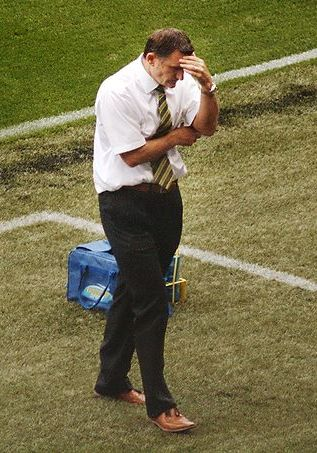
Mowbray as Celtic manager

On 8 June 2009, it was reported that Celtic had approached West Bromwich Albion for permission to speak to Mowbray about their managerial vacancy. A compensation fee of £2 million was agreed, and Celtic declared Mowbray as their new manager on 16 June 2009. He was unveiled as Celtic manager at a press conference a day later. His coaching team was Neil Lennon, Peter Grant, Mark Venus, and Stevie Woods. On 12 September 2009 was named as the Coach of the Month of August in the Scottish Premier League.

Mowbray was described as "beleaguered" by The Herald after Celtic fell 10 points behind Old Firm rivals Rangers in the SPL title race after a 2–1 home defeat by Hibs.

Mowbray decided to make significant changes to his squad during the January 2010 transfer window, selling Gary Caldwell and Barry Robson, which apparently caused disruption to the team in the immediate aftermath of those deals being completed. Robbie Keane was recruited early in 2010 on a loan deal from Tottenham Hotspur amid great excitement; however, further poor results, particularly a record 4–0 defeat by St Mirren, led to Mowbray being dismissed on 25 March 2010. It was reported in May 2010 that Celtic had yet to agree compensation with Mowbray and his management team.

=== Middlesbrough ===
Mowbray was appointed Middlesbrough manager on 26 October 2010, replacing Gordon Strachan. He lost his first match in charge, 2–1 against Bristol City, but followed this with wins against Crystal Palace and Scunthorpe. Mowbray guided Boro to Championship safety, having joined the club when they were 22nd in the league. The club finished the season well, winning their last four league games and finished 12th in the league table. The same season, Mowbray started giving youngsters a first team place such as Joe Bennett, Luke Williams and Richard Smallwood. Mowbray also started giving Marvin Emnes more playing time after returning on loan from Swansea City.

Middlesbrough began the 2011–12 season well and Mowbray won manager of the month for September. Middlesbrough relinquished the only unbeaten record in the league after a 2–0 defeat to Nottingham Forest in October 2011. After a poor start to 2012, Middlesbrough's form picked up in late February with four wins in five games. Middlesbrough finished 7th in the 2011–12 season, missing out on a play-off place by one position.

After an unbeaten run in October 2012, Mowbray won the accolade of Championship Manager of the Month for that month. On 21 October 2013, it was announced that Mowbray had left the club with immediate effect after a run of two wins in 12 games in the 2013–14 campaign.

=== Coventry City ===
On 3 March 2015, Mowbray was appointed manager of Coventry City on a deal until the end of the 2014–15 season. With the club facing the possibility of relegation to the fourth-tier for the first time since the late 1950s, Tony Mowbray's initial brief was to keep the club in the third-tier. A final-day victory away at Crawley Town was enough for Mowbray to secure League One football for the Sky Blues for the 2015–16 season.

Following protracted negotiations at the end of the season, Mowbray agreed to sign a two-year contract extension to remain as Coventry City manager.

Mowbray resigned from Coventry City on 29 September 2016 after a string of results without a win.

=== Blackburn Rovers ===
On 22 February 2017, Mowbray was appointed head coach of Blackburn Rovers on an 18-month contract, effectively lasting until the end of the 2017–18 season. Despite an improvement in form that offered some hope of survival, Blackburn were relegated to League One at the end of the 2016–17 season.

Mowbray signed a new contract that would keep him at the club until 2019, with an option of a further 12 months after that as well. Under his managership, Blackburn won promotion back to the Championship after a single year in League One. Their promotion was assured on 24 April, after a 1–0 away win against Doncaster Rovers.

In the 2018–19 season, Mowbray led Blackburn to a final finish of 15th in the Championship. In the EFL Cup, they reached the third round before being eliminated at AFC Bournemouth. In the FA Cup, Blackburn were eliminated in the third round after extra time in a replay against Newcastle United.

In the 2019–20 season, Mowbray secured an 11th-place finish in the Championship. In the EFL Cup, the team reached the second round before defeat at Sheffield United. They were defeated in the third round of the FA Cup by Birmingham City. Mowbray left Blackburn at the conclusion of his contract in May 2022 and was replaced by Jon Dahl Tomasson as head coach. Mowbray had served five years in the post.

=== Sunderland ===
On 30 August 2022, Mowbray was appointed head coach of Championship club Sunderland replacing Alex Neil.

Mowbray led Sunderland to the play-offs, finishing sixth in his first season. The club won the first leg against Luton Town 2–1 at the Stadium of Light but lost 2–0 in the second leg, losing 3–2 on aggregate.

On 4 December 2023, Mowbray was dismissed by Sunderland, with the club in ninth position in the Championship.

=== Birmingham City ===
Mowbray was appointed manager of Championship club Birmingham City on 8 January 2024, replacing Wayne Rooney; he signed a two-and-a-half-year contract. On 19 February, the club announced that the need for medical treatment forced his temporary withdrawal from the role. His assistant, Mark Venus, took charge for a month, and on 19 March, Birmingham confirmed that Mowbray was taking formal medical leave until the start of 2024–25 pre-season and that their former manager Gary Rowett would take charge for the last eight games of the season. The team were unable to avoid relegation. On 21 May 2024, Mowbray resigned as manager with immediate effect, stating that his health would not allow him to resume his duties soon enough for the needs of the club, and that once fit, he intended to prioritise "quality time" with his family before returning to football management. Mowbray later confirmed that he had been diagnosed with bowel cancer.

=== Return to West Bromwich Albion ===
On 18 January 2025, Mowbray was reappointed head coach of EFL Championship club West Bromwich Albion on a two-and-a-half-year contract.

On 21 April 2025, Mowbray was dismissed by West Bromwich Albion after a run of poor results.

=== Return to Blackburn Rovers ===
On 5 June 2026, Mowbray was reappointed head coach of EFL Championship club Blackburn Rovers. On 17 November 2026, Mowbray stepped down as the club's head coach due to health issues.

== Personal life ==
Mowbray has three sons with his wife, Amber Mowbray. His first wife, Bernadette Doyle Mowbray, died of breast cancer on New Year's Day 1995, aged 26.

Mowbray's brother Darren was the head of recruitment at Southampton from 2023 until 2025. Darren later returned to Aberdeen as their head of recruitment on 3 March 2026.

== Career statistics ==
Club	Season	League			National cup (Note: Includes FA Cup, Scottish Cup)		League cup (Note: Includes League Cup, Scottish League Cup)		Other		Total	
Club	Season	Division	Apps	Goals	Apps	Goals	Apps	Goals	Apps	Goals	Apps	Goals
Middlesbrough	1982–83	Second Division	26	0	3	0	2	0	0	0	31	0
Middlesbrough	1983–84	Second Division	35	1	3	0	1	0	0	0	39	1
Middlesbrough	1984–85	Second Division	40	3	2	0	2	0	0	0	44	3
Middlesbrough	1985–86	Second Division	35	4	0	0	2	0	1 (Note: Appearances in Full Members' Cup)	0	38	4
Middlesbrough	1986–87	Third Division	46	7	3	0	4	0	5 (Note: Appearances in Football League Trophy)	0	58	7
Middlesbrough	1987–88	Second Division	44	3	5	1	4	1	5 (Note: One appearance in Full Members' Cup and four appearances in Football League Second Division play-offs)	0	58	5
Middlesbrough	1988–89	First Division	37	3	1	0	2	0	4	0	44	3
Middlesbrough	1989–90	Second Division	28	2	3	0	3	0	4	0	38	2
Middlesbrough	1990–91	Second Division	40	3	3	0	6	1	4 (Note: Two appearances and goal in Full Members' Cup and two appearances in Football League Second Division play-offs)	1	53	5
Middlesbrough	1991–92	Second Division	17	0	0	0	3	0	1	0	21	0
Middlesbrough	Total		348	26	23	1	29	2	24	1	424	30
Celtic	1991–92	Scottish Premier Division	15	2	2	0	0	0	0	0	17	2
Celtic	1992–93	Scottish Premier Division	26	1	0	0	3	0	4 (Note: Appearances in UEFA Cup)	0	33	1
Celtic	1993–94	Scottish Premier Division	21	1	1	0	0	0	2	0	24	1
Celtic	1994–95	Scottish Premier Division	15	1	2	0	4	0	0	0	21	1
Celtic	Total		77	5	5	0	7	0	6	0	95	5
Ipswich Town	1995–96	First Division	19	2	4	0	0	0	3 (Note: Appearances in Anglo-Italian Cup)	1	26	3
Ipswich Town	1996–97	First Division	8	0	0	0	1	0	0	0	9	0
Ipswich Town	1997–98	First Division	25	0	2	0	4	1	0	0	31	1
Ipswich Town	1998–99	First Division	40	2	2	0	2	0	2 (Note: Appearances in First Division play-offs)	0	46	2
Ipswich Town	1999–2000	First Division	36	1	1	0	0	0	3	1	40	2
Ipswich Town	Total		128	5	9	0	7	1	8	2	152	8
Career total			553	36	37	1	43	3	38	3	670	43

== Managerial statistics ==
As of match played 7 November 2026

Managerial record by team and tenure
Team	From	To	Record				
Team	From	To	P	W	D	L	Win %
Ipswich Town (caretaker)	11 October 2002	28 October 2002	4	1	1	2	25.00
Hibernian	24 May 2004	13 October 2006	108	52	16	40	48.15
West Bromwich Albion	18 October 2006	16 June 2009	140	57	32	51	40.71
Celtic	16 June 2009	25 March 2010	45	23	9	13	51.11
Middlesbrough	26 October 2010	21 October 2013	153	61	37	55	39.87
Coventry City	3 March 2015	29 September 2016	76	26	24	26	34.21
Blackburn Rovers	22 February 2017	30 May 2022	267	108	70	89	40.45
Sunderland	30 August 2022	4 December 2023	65	26	18	21	40.00
Birmingham City	8 January 2024	19 February 2024 (Note: When Mowbray confirmed on 19 February 2024 that he needed medical treatment, Mark Venus took charge with immediate effect.)	8	4	1	3	50.00
West Bromwich Albion	17 January 2025 (Note: Soccerbase include the drawn match with Stoke City on 19 January 2025, two days after Mowbray's appointment, that was taken by Chris Brunt.)	21 April 2025	17	5	4	8	29.41
Blackburn Rovers	5 June 2026	17 November 2026	17	7	3	7	41.18
Total			900	370	215	315	41.11

== Honours ==
=== As a player ===
Middlesbrough

- Football League Second Division play-offs: 1988
- Football League Third Division runner-up: 1986–87

Ipswich Town

- Football League First Division play-offs: 2000

Individual

- Middlesbrough Player of the Year: 1984–85, 1985–86
- PFA Team of the Year: 1987–88 Second Division
- Ipswich Town Hall of Fame: Inducted 2016

=== As a manager ===
West Bromwich Albion

- Football League Championship: 2007–08

Blackburn Rovers

- EFL League One second-place promotion: 2017–18

Individual Awards

- Scottish Premier League Manager of the Month: December 2004, May 2005, November 2005, August 2009
- Scottish Football Writers' Association Manager of the Year: 2004–2005
- Scottish Premier League Manager of the Year: 2004–2005
- BBC Scotland Off The Ball Manager of the Year: 2004–2005
- League Managers Association Manager of the Year: 2007–2008
- BBC North East Sports Personality of the Year: 2011
- Championship Manager of the Month: September 2007, October 2012, January 2019
- League One Manager of the Month: November 2017
