= Amadou Konte =

Malian footballer (born 1981)

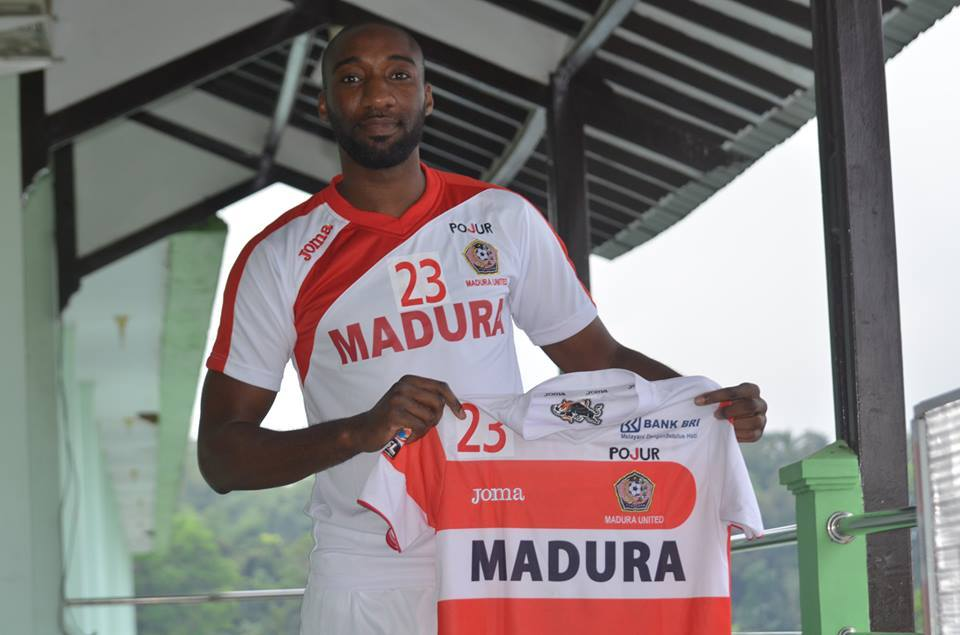
- Konte with Persepam Madura United in 2013

Personal information
- Date of birth: 13 January 1981 (age 45)
- Place of birth: Bamako, Mali
- Height: 1.91 m (6 ft 3 in)
- Position: Striker

Senior career*
Years	Team	Apps	(Gls)
2002–2003	Olympique Noisy-le-Sec	4	(0)
2003	Paternò	16	(2)
2004	Cambridge United	19	(3)
2005–2006	Hibernian	27	(1)
2007	Kalamata	0	(0)
2007–2008	Potenza	16	(3)
2008	→ Spezia (loan)	6	(0)
2008	Potenza	3	(0)
2008–2009	Turate	20	(8)
2009	Messina	0	(0)
2009–2012	Bitonto	0	(0)
2013	Minyor Pernik	0	(0)
2013	Persepam Madura United	2	(0)
- * Club domestic league appearances and goals as of 20 May 2013

Amadou Konte (born 13 January 1981) is a Malian former footballer who played as a striker. He also holds French citizenship.

== Career ==
Konte started his career in the football academy of French side RC Strasbourg before moving to Portuguese club FC Porto. He did not make a first team breakthrough in FC Porto though, and moved again, firstly to CF Villanovense in Spain, then Olympique Noisy-le-Sec in CFA and Paternò in Serie C1.

In the summer of 2004 Konte signed for Cambridge United and scored 3 goals in 9 appearances. This was enough to prompt interest from Hibernian, who signed him during the January 2005 transfer window, and he made his debut in a 3–0 defeat to Rangers at Ibrox the next month. His first goal was a late equaliser against Motherwell in May, earning Hibs a crucial point in their successful quest to qualify for European competition.

The 2005–06 season was less rewarding for Konte though, as the striker endured inconsistent form and infrequent appearances. This led to him being ironically dubbed the "Mali Magician" by some Hibs fans. When Konte again struggled to gain first team action in the first part of the 2006–07 season (despite scoring twice against Dinaburg FC in the UEFA Intertoto Cup) he was released from his contract. He left Hibernian one day before the appointment of new manager John Collins, in November 2006. In 2020, Konte reflected on his time at Hibs, stating that he enjoys his status as a cult favourite and felt that the nickname bestowed upon him by fans was an affectionate one.

In January 2007, he joined Messiniakos of Greek 2nd division. In summer 2007, he signed for Potenza S.C. of Serie C1, and in January 2008, he was loaned to Spezia.

In September 2009, after a nine-month stint with Turate, he was signed by Sicilian club Messina on a free transfer.
