= Lee Turnbull (footballer) =

English footballer and manager

Personal information
- Full name: Lee Mark Turnbull
- Date of birth: 27 September 1967 (age 59)
- Place of birth: Stockton-on-Tees, England
- Height: 6 ft 1 in (1.85 m)
- Positions: Striker; midfielder

Senior career*
Years	Team	Apps	(Gls)
1984–1987	Middlesbrough	21	(5)
1987–1988	Aston Villa	0	(0)
1987–1991	Doncaster Rovers	137	(28)
1991–1994	Chesterfield	95	(29)
1994	Doncaster Rovers	14	(2)
1994–1995	Wycombe Wanderers	14	(2)
1995–1997	Scunthorpe United	53	(8)
1997–1998	Darlington	12	(0)
1998–1999	Halifax Town		
1999–2002	Barrow		
Total		402	(81)

Managerial career
- 2003–2005: Barrow
- * Club domestic league appearances and goals

Lee Turnbull (born 27 September 1967) is an English former professional footballer who could play in either midfield or attack. He is currently Head of Recruitment at Partick Thistle since April 2025.

== Playing career ==
Turnbull started his career as an apprentice in 1984 with Middlesbrough before signing professional forms in 1985. He played a part in the club's comeback from liquidation in 1986, making his debut in a cup game away at Hull in November 1985 before a league debut off the bench against Millwall and a league start away to Shrewsbury, but witnessed the club's relegation from the Championship. Turnbull made 21 appearances in league and cup in total for The Boro, scoring five goals, in the promotion winning season 1986–87.

He left Middlesbrough in 1987, joining Aston Villa for a £50,000 fee. He was one of Graham Taylor's first signings. He left Villa without any appearances to his name, featuring only once on the bench against Manchester City, and went on to play for various lower league teams.

During his spell at Doncaster Rovers, he made 150 league and cup appearances. He scored two hat-tricks for Rovers, including a hat-trick of headers against Aldershot in a 3–0 win. He went on to play for Chesterfield and Wycombe Wanderers before joining Scunthorpe United, initially on loan from Wycombe in 1994. He was club captain at Scunthorpe. He ended his professional career at Darlington. His moves represented combined transfer fees of over £100,000 in a career of around 400 appearances and 70 goals in league and cup.

== Football management and other roles ==
Turnbull retired from full-time professional football through injury at Darlington, joining Halifax then Gainsborough Trinity as player coach during 1998–99.

=== Barrow ===
Turnbull joined Barrow as assistant manager in 1999 and took over from Kenny Lowe as manager in April 2003. The club achieved second and third-place finishes during his time at the club, as well as three cup final victories. Players such as Grant Holt and Glenn Murray played for Barrow whilst Turnbull was at Holker Street. He was sacked in November 2005 after six and a half years at the club.

==== Short-term appointments ====
He went on to work as assistant manager at Southport, where he helped secure Conference status alongside manager Liam Watson, as head of recruitment and scouting at Sheffield United, and, for three months in 2016, was head of recruitment at Oldham Athletic.

=== Scunthorpe United ===
Turnbull served as former club Scunthorpe United's head of community for 17 years from 1998. He was the club's chief scout between 2006 and 2011, and again between 2014 and 2015. He rejoined the club as head of recruitment in September 2016. Turnbull identified and helped recruit several players for Scunthorpe who went on to be sold for seven-figure sums. These include Gary Hooper (£2.4 million), Billy Sharp (£2 million) and Martin Paterson (£1 million). He left the club in June 2020.

==== Short-term appointments ====
In November 2020, Turnbull joined Chesterfield in an advisory role. In December 2020 it was announced that Turnbull had begun working for Bradford City as recruitment director. He left the club in September 2021, and in December 2021, joined Hartlepool United in a consulting capacity to lead the scouting and recruitment of the club.

=== Return to Scunthorpe United ===
With the Iron bottom of League Two, ten points from safety, Turnbull returned to Scunthorpe, as chief operating officer, in March 2022, when Peter Swann stood down as the club's chairman.He was appointed CEO and DOF at The Iron, leaving his position during 2025.

Partick Thistle Fc

Turnbull was appointed Head of Recruitment in May 2025 , working alongside former colleague Ian Baraclough, Thistles Sporting Director.
