= Gary Hamilton (footballer, born 1965) =

Scottish footballer

Personal information
- Date of birth: 27 December 1965 (age 60)
- Place of birth: Glasgow, Scotland
- Height: 5 ft 9 in (1.75 m)
- Position: Midfielder

Team information
- Current team: Houston Dynamo South Tx Academy head coach

Senior career*
Years	Team	Apps	(Gls)
1983–1992	Middlesbrough	259	(28)
1991–1992	Darlington	15	(2)
Total		274	(30)
- * Club domestic league appearances and goals

Gary Hamilton is a Scottish former football player, who spent almost his entire career at Middlesbrough. Born in Glasgow, Hamilton started his career at Middlesbrough as an apprentice, making his first team debut in 1983 aged 17. He went on to play over 200 games for Middlesbrough, his last being against Sheffield Wednesday in May 1989.

Hamilton officially retired from playing in 1992 after several attempts at a comeback from a knee injury, and now has a successful coaching career in the United States. He is currently the head coach of the Houston Dynamo Juniors in McAllen, TX. He also is the Director of the McAllen Youth Soccer Association where he trains young footballers to become professionals.

Hamilton has a brick in the 'Boro Brick Road' outside the Riverside Stadium, having won a fans' poll for best player in the period 1966–1986. He came first with 15.1% of the votes, beating Craig Johnston, with 14.5%, into second place.

== Honours ==
Middlesbrough

- Football League Second Division play-offs: 1988
