= Archie Stephens =

English footballer

Personal information
- Full name: Arthur Stephens
- Date of birth: 19 May 1954 (age 72)
- Place of birth: Liverpool, England
- Height: 5 ft 11 in (1.80 m)
- Position: Striker

Senior career*
Years	Team	Apps	(Gls)
????–1976	Ward Blenkisop		
1976–1980	Westbury United		
1980–1981	Melksham Town		
1981–1984	Bristol Rovers	127	(40)
1984–1988	Middlesbrough	92	(24)
1987–1989	Carlisle United	24	(3)
1988–1989	Yeovil Town		
1988–1989	Darlington	10	(4)
1989	Guisborough		
Total		253	(71)

Managerial career
- 1997–1998: Northallerton Town
- * Club domestic league appearances and goals

Arthur "Archie" Stephens (born 19 May 1954) is a retired footballer. He played over 120 times for Bristol Rovers before moving north to Middlesbrough. He later went on to play for other local teams Carlisle United and Darlington before finishing his career at Guisborough Town.

He was appointed manager at Northallerton Town early in the 1997–98 season, but left at the end of the season after the club were relegated.
