= 1998–99 Motherwell F.C. season =

Motherwell
1998–99 season
- Chairman: John Boyle
- Manager: Harri Kampman (until 15 October); Billy Davies (from 15 October)
- Premier League: 7th
- Scottish Cup: Quarterfinal vs St Johnstone
- League Cup: Third round vs Ayr United
- Top goalscorer: League: Two Players (7); All: Owen Coyle (8)
Home colours

The 1998–99 season was Motherwell's 1st season in the Scottish Premier League, and their 14th consecutive season in the top division of Scottish football.

== Season events ==
On 25 June, Brian McClair signed for Motherwell on a three-year contract, having been given a free transfer by Manchester United.

On 13 January, Andy Goram signed for Motherwell on a contract until the end of the season.

== Squad ==
As of match played 23 May 1999

No.	Name	Nationality	Position	Date of birth (age)	Signed from	Signed in	Contract ends	Apps.	Goals
Goalkeepers
1	Stevie Woods	(Scotland)	GK	23 February 1970 (aged 29)	Preston North End	1994			
27	Phillip Bannister	(Scotland)	GK	6 August 1980 (aged 18)	Academy	1998		0	0
29	Andy Goram	(Scotland)	GK	13 April 1964 (aged 35)	Sheffield United	1999	1999	16	0
Defenders
2	Eddie May	(Scotland)	DF	30 August 1967 (aged 31)	Falkirk	1994			
3	Steve McMillan	(Scotland)	DF	19 January 1976 (aged 23)	Troon	1993			
4	Jamie McGowan	(England)	DF	5 December 1970 (aged 28)	Falkirk	1998		35	1
6	Greig Denham	(Scotland)	DF	5 October 1976 (aged 22)	Youth team	1994			
15	Tony Thomas	(England)	DF	12 July 1971 (aged 27)	Everton	1998		11	1
19	Michel Doesburg	(Netherlands)	DF	10 August 1968 (aged 30)	AZ Alkmaar	1998		34	0
21	Stephen Craigan	(Northern Ireland)	DF	29 October 1976 (aged 22)	Blantyre Victoria	1995			
22	Jered Stirling	(Scotland)	DF	13 October 1976 (aged 22)	Partick Thistle	1998		7	1
26	David White	(Scotland)	DF	9 September 1979 (aged 19)	Ipswich Town	1998		0	0
28	Shaun Teale	(England)	DF	10 March 1964 (aged 35)	Tranmere Rovers	1998		34	1
31	Steven Reilly	(Scotland)	DF	29 August 1981 (aged 17)	Youth team	1998		0	0
34	Sandy Hodge	(Scotland)	DF	4 October 1980 (aged 18)	Youth team	1998		0	0
35	David Doherty	(Scotland)	DF	8 May 1980 (aged 19)	Youth team	1998		0	0
38	Craig Callachan	(Scotland)	DF	26 August 1981 (aged 17)	Youth team	1998		0	0
Midfielders
5	Ged Brannan	(England)	MF	15 January 1972 (aged 27)	Manchester City	1994			
7	Ian Ross	(Scotland)	MF	27 August 1974 (aged 24)	Youth team	1995			
8	Simo Valakari	(Finland)	MF	28 April 1973 (aged 26)	FinnPa	1996			
10	Mark Gower	(England)	MF	5 October 1978 (aged 20)	on loan from Tottenham Hotspur	1999		9	1
16	Billy Davies	(Scotland)	MF	31 May 1964 (aged 34)	Dunfermline Athletic	1993			
18	Lee McCulloch	(Scotland)	MF	14 May 1978 (aged 21)	Youth team	1994		83	6
20	Rob Matthaei	(Netherlands)	MF	20 September 1966 (aged 32)	Volendam	1998		19	0
23	Dougie Ramsay	(Scotland)	MF	26 April 1979 (aged 20)	Youth team	1998		4	1
24	Greg Miller	(Scotland)	MF	1 April 1976 (aged 23)	Livingston	1998		6	0
30	Pat Nevin	(Scotland)	MF	6 September 1963 (aged 35)	Kilmarnock	1998		33	0
37	David Dunn	(Scotland)	MF	1 November 1981 (aged 17)	Youth team	1998		0	0
39	Derek Adams	(Scotland)	MF	25 June 1975 (aged 23)	Ross County	1998		29	3
	Keith Lasley	(Scotland)	MF	21 September 1979 (aged 19)	Youth team	1998		0	0
Forwards
9	Stephen Halliday	(England)	FW	3 May 1976 (aged 23)	Hartlepool United	1998		6	1
11	Stevie Nicholas	(Scotland)	FW	8 July 1981 (aged 17)	Stirling Albion	1998		7	1
25	Daniel Kemp	(Scotland)	FW	20 January 1980 (aged 19)	Youth team	1998		0	0
36	Scott Crawford	(Scotland)	FW	22 July 1980 (aged 18)	Youth team	1998		0	0
40	John Spencer	(Scotland)	FW	11 September 1970 (aged 28)	Everton	1999		24	7
44	Don Goodman	(England)	FW	9 May 1966 (aged 33)	on loan from Sanfrecce Hiroshima	1999	1999	8	1
Out on loan
	Hervé Bacqué	(France)	FW	31 July 1976 (aged 22)	Luton Town	1999		1	0
Left during the season
5	Holm Kraska	(Germany)	DF	30 July 1975 (aged 23)	Atlas Delmenhorst	1998		0	0
10	Brian McClair	(Scotland)	MF	8 December 1963 (aged 35)	Manchester United	1998	2001		
11	Owen Coyle	(Republic of Ireland)	FW	14 July 1966 (aged 32)	Dundee United	1997			
12	Jan Michels	(Netherlands)	MF	8 September 1970 (aged 28)	Go Ahead Eagles	1998		11	0
13	Mikko Kavén	(Finland)	GK	19 February 1975 (aged 24)	HJK	1998		17	0
14	Kevin Christie	(Scotland)	DF	1 April 1976 (aged 23)	East Fife	1997			
15	Eliphas Shivute	(Namibia)	FW	27 September 1974 (aged 24)	Alemannia Aachen	1997		25	3
29	Kai Nyyssönen	(Finland)	FW	10 June 1972 (aged 26)	Córdoba	1998		4	1

== Transfers ==
=== In ===
Date	Position	Nationality	Name	From	Fee	Ref
25 June 1998	MF	(Scotland)	Brian McClair	Manchester United	Free	
1 July 1998	GK	(Finland)	Mikko Kavén	HJK	£50,000	
1 July 1998	DF	(Germany)	Holm Kraska	Atlas Delmenhorst	Undisclosed	
1 July 1998	DF	(England)	Jamie McGowan	Falkirk	Free	
1 July 1998	DF	(Netherlands)	Michel Doesburg	AZ Alkmaar	Undisclosed	
1 July 1998	DF	(Scotland)	Jered Stirling	Partick Thistle	Undisclosed	
1 July 1998	DF	(Scotland)	David White	Ipswich Town	Undisclosed	
1 July 1998	DF	(England)	Shaun Teale	Tranmere Rovers	Undisclosed	
1 July 1998	MF	(Netherlands)	Jan Michels	Go Ahead Eagles	Undisclosed	
1 July 1998	MF	(Netherlands)	Rob Matthaei	Volendam	Undisclosed	
1 July 1998	MF	(Scotland)	Greg Miller	Livingston	Undisclosed	
1 July 1998	MF	(Scotland)	Derek Adams	Ross County	£200,000	
1 July 1998	FW	(England)	Stephen Halliday	Hartlepool United	£50,000	
1 July 1998	FW	(Finland)	Kai Nyyssönen	Córdoba	Undisclosed	
1 July 1998	FW	(Scotland)	Stevie Nicholas	Stirling Albion	£100,000	
3 September 1998	MF	(Scotland)	Pat Nevin	Kilmarnock	Free	
25 October 1998	MF	(England)	Ged Brannan	Manchester City	£350,000	
16 December 1998	DF	(England)	Tony Thomas	Everton	£150,000	
1 January 1999	FW	(France)	Hervé Bacqué	Luton Town	Undisclosed	
13 January 1999	GK	(Scotland)	Andy Goram	Sheffield United	Undisclosed	
28 January 1999	FW	(Scotland)	John Spencer	Everton	Undisclosed	

=== Loans in ===
Date from	Position	Nationality	Name	From	Date to	Ref.
26 October 1998	FW	(Scotland)	John Spencer	Everton	27 January 1999	
12 March 1999	MF	(England)	Mark Gower	Tottenham Hotspur	End of season	
23 March 1999	FW	(England)	Don Goodman	Sanfrecce Hiroshima	End of season	

=== Out ===
Date	Position	Nationality	Name	To	Fee	Ref.
1 January 1999	GK	(Finland)	Mikko Kavén	Vålerenga	Undisclosed	
1 January 1999	DF	(Germany)	Holm Kraska	Lok Stendal	Undisclosed	
1 February 1999	MF	(Netherlands)	Jan Michels	Den Bosch	Undisclosed	
1 April 1998	FW	(Finland)	Kai Nyyssönen	Haka	Undisclosed	

=== Loans out ===
Date from	Position	Nationality	Name	To	Date to	Ref.
19 March 1999	MF	(Scotland)	Dougie Ramsay	East Fife	19 April 1999	
1 May 1999	FW	(France)	Hervé Bacqué	Lyn	End of season	

=== Released ===
Date	Position	Nationality	Name	Joined	Date	Ref.
17 December 1998	MF	(Scotland)	Brian McClair	Retirement		

== Competitions ==
=== Overview ===
Competition	First match	Last match	Starting round	Final position	Record							
Competition	First match	Last match	Starting round	Final position	Pld	W	D	L	GF	GA	GD	Win %
Premier League	1 August 1998	23 May 1999	Matchday 1	7th	36	10	11	15	35	54	−19	27.78
Scottish Cup	24 January 1999	6 March 1999	Third round	Quarterfinal	3	2	0	1	5	3	+2	66.67
League Cup	8 August 1998	18 August 1998	Second round	Third Round	2	1	0	1	1	2	−1	50.00
Total					41	13	11	17	41	59	−18	31.71

Last updated: 23 May 1999
Source: Soccerway

=== Premier League ===
==== League table ====
Pos	Team	Pld	W	D	L	GF	GA	GD	Pts
5	Dundee	36	13	7	16	36	56	−20	46
6	Heart of Midlothian	36	11	9	16	44	50	−6	42
7	Motherwell	36	10	11	15	35	54	−19	41
8	Aberdeen	36	10	7	19	43	71	−28	37
9	Dundee United	36	8	10	18	37	48	−11	34

Updated to match(es) played on end of season. Source: Soccerway and SPL official website
Rules for classification: 1) Points; 2) Goal difference; 3) Goals scored

==== Results summary ====
Overall								Home						Away					
Pld	W	D	L	GF	GA	GD	Pts	W	D	L	GF	GA	GD	W	D	L	GF	GA	GD
36	10	11	15	34	54	−20	41	6	5	7	19	31	−12	4	6	8	15	23	−8

Source: Fir Park Corner

==== Results by round ====
Round	1	2	3	4	5	6	7	8	9	10	11	12	13	14	15	16	17	18	19	20	21	22	23	24	25	26	27	28	29	30	31	32	33	34	35	36
Ground	H	A	H	H	A	H	A	A	H	A	H	H	A	H	A	A	A	H	H	H	A	H	H	A	H	H	A	H	A	H	A	H	A	A	H	A
Result	W	L	D	W	D	D	L	L	L	L	W	D	D	W	D	L	D	W	L	W	D	L	W	L	L	D	L	D	W	L	L	L	W	D	L	W
Position	4	6	6	6	5	3	7	7	10	10	8	8	9	5	6	7	8	6	6	5	5	5	5	5	5	5	6	5	5	5	5	6	6	6	7	7

Source: Fir Park Corner
A = Away; H = Home; W = Win; D = Draw; L = Loss

==== Results ====
1 August 1998 1	Motherwell	1–0	St Johnstone	Fir Park
	Stirling 49'		Kane (red card) 30'	Attendance: 5,686; Referee: Alan Freeland

15 August 1998 2	Rangers	2–1	Motherwell	Ibrox
	Wallace 16'; Albertz 90' (pen.)		Coyle 52'	Attendance: 49,275; Referee: George Simpson

22 August 1998 3	Motherwell	0–0	Dunfermline Athletic	Fir Park
				Attendance: 9,858; Referee: Martin Clark

30 August 1998 4	Motherwell	1–0	Dundee United	Fir Park
	Nyyssonen 43'			Attendance: 11,201; Referee: Jim McCluskey

12 September 1998 5	Aberdeen	1–1	Motherwell	Pittodrie
	Jess 7'		Coyle 34'	Attendance: 11,560; Referee: Kenny Clark

19 September 1998 6	Motherwell	0–0	Kilmarnock	Fir Park

23 September 1998 7	Hearts	3–0	Motherwell	Tynecastle
	Weir 71'; McCann 87' (pen.), 90'			Attendance: 12,323; Referee: Kenny Clark

26 September 1998 8	Dundee	1–0	Motherwell	Dens Park
	Irvine 8'			Attendance: 5,655

3 October 1998 9	Motherwell	1–2	Celtic	Fir Park
	Adams 90'		Brattbakk 29'; Lambert 45'	Attendance: 12,103; Referee: Jim McCluskey

17 October 1998 10	St Johnstone	5–0	Motherwell	McDiarmid Park
	O'Boyle 39', 85'; Kernaghan 53'; Simao 62'; Dods 88'			Attendance: 4,062; Referee: John Rowbotham

28 October 1998 11	Motherwell	1–0	Rangers	Fir Park
	Spencer 55'			Attendance: 11,777; Referee: Eric Martindale

31 October 1998 12	Motherwell	2–2	Aberdeen	Fir Park
	Spencer 57'; Jamie McGowan 69'		Newell 31'; Winters 47'	Attendance: 8,146; Referee: Garry Mitchell

7 November 1998 13	Dundee United	2–2	Motherwell	Tannadice
	Dodds 48'; Jonsson 60'		Coyle 4', 50'; McCulloch (yellow card) 37' (yellow-red card)	Attendance: 6,616; Referee: Michael McCurry

14 November 1998 14	Motherwell	3–2	Hearts	Fir Park
	Spencer 40'; Coyle 68', 84'		Hamilton 69' (pen.); Guerin 85'	Attendance: 8,912; Referee: Martin Clark

21 November 1998 15	Kilmarnock	0–0	Motherwell	Rugby Park
				Attendance: 10,176; Referee: Jim McCluskey

28 November 1998 16	Celtic	2–0	Motherwell	Celtic Park
	Larsson 40'; O'Donnell 46'			Attendance: 59,227; Referee: Kenny Clark

12 December 1998 17	Dunfermline Athletic	1–1	Motherwell	East End Park
	Tod (red card) 48'; Smith 79'		Spencer 47'; Doesburg (red card) 88'	Attendance: 13,102; Referee: Alan Freeland

16 December 1998 18	Motherwell	2–1	Dundee	Fir Park
	Coyle 34'; McMillan 77'; Teale (red card) 82'		Adamczuk 37'	Attendance: 5,890; Referee: Eric Martindale

19 December 1998 19	Motherwell	1–2	St Johnstone	Fir Park
	Adams 27'		Connolly 31'; Grant 72'	Attendance: 5,700; Referee: Willie Young

26 December 1998 20	Motherwell	2–0	Dundee United	Fir Park
	McMillan 55'; Brannan 57'			Attendance: 6,001

29 December 1998 21	Aberdeen	1–1	Motherwell	Pittodrie
	Jess 31'		McCulloch 67'; McMillan (red card) 83'	Attendance: 15,269; Referee: John Underhill

1 January 1999 22	Motherwell	1–2	Kilmarnock	Fir Park
	Brannan 26'		McCoist 15'; McGowne 86'	Attendance: 8,532; Referee: Kenny Clark

30 January 1999 23	Hearts	0–2	Motherwell	Tynecastle
			McCulloch 48'; Adams 71'	Attendance: 12,821; Referee: Willie Young

6 February 1999 24	Dundee	1–0	Motherwell	Dens Park
	Tweed 3'; Irvine (yellow card) 86' (yellow-red card)			Attendance: 4,187; Referee: Ian Fyfe

21 February 1999 25	Motherwell	1–7	Celtic	Fir Park
	Spencer (red card) 14'; Brannan 26'		Larsson 22' (pen.), 65', 86', 87'; Moravcik 30'; Burley 74'; Burchill 85'	Attendance: 11,963; Referee: Kenny Clark

27 February 1999 26	Motherwell	1–1	Dunfermline Athletic	Fir Park
	McCulloch 46'		Britton 86'	Attendance: 6,094; Referee: Willie Young

13 March 1999 27	Rangers	2–1	Motherwell	Ibrox
	Wallace 31'; Johansson 59'		Mark Gower 68'	Attendance: 49,483; Referee: Bobby Orr

20 March 1999 28	Motherwell	1–1	Aberdeen	Fir Park
	Teale 90' (pen.)		Winters 59'	Attendance: 6,963; Referee: John Rowbotham

3 April 1999 29	Dundee United	0–3	Motherwell	Tannadice
			Brannan 7'; Spencer 38', 60'	Attendance: 8,110; Referee: Martin Clark

10 April 1999 30	Motherwell	1–2	Dundee	Fir Park
	Spencer 2'; Thomas (red card) 44'		Falconer 65'; Grady 73'	Attendance: 5,717; Referee: Eric Martindale

17 April 1999 31	Celtic	1–0	Motherwell	Celtic Park
	Larsson 63' (pen.)			Attendance: 59,588; Referee: Jim McCluskey

24 April 1999 32	Motherwell	0–4	Hearts	Fir Park
			Jackson 21'; Adam 46', 59'; Cameron 90'	Attendance: 8,926; Referee: Alan Freeland

1 May 1999 33	Kilmarnock	0–1	Motherwell	Rugby Park
			Brannan 53' (pen.)	Attendance: 8,867; Referee: Kevin Toner

8 May 1999 34	St Johnstone	0–0	Motherwell	McDiarmid Park
				Attendance: 4,599; Referee: Ian Fyfe

15 May 1999 35	Motherwell	1–5	Rangers	Fir Park
	Nicholas 74'		Amato 16', 51', 54' (pen.); Van Bronckhorst 37'; Kanchelskis 65'	Attendance: 11,078

23 May 1999 36	Dunfermline Athletic	1–2	Motherwell	East End Park
	Boyle 20'		Goodman 76'; Ramsay 90'	Attendance: 3,532

=== Scottish Cup ===
24 January 1999 Third Round	Motherwell	3–1	Hearts	Motherwell
	Brannan 13'; Coyle 65'; Thomas 74'		Hamilton 56'	Stadium: Fir Park; Attendance: 9,372; Referee: Michael McCurry

13 February 1999 Fourth Round	Motherwell	2–0	Stirling Albion	Motherwell
	McCulloch 63'; Forrest 86' (o.g.)	[ Report]		Stadium: Fir Park; Attendance: 7,244; Referee: Bobby Orr

6 March 1999 Quarter-Finals	Motherwell	0–2	St Johnstone	Motherwell
		[ Report]	Dods 71'; Simao 80'	Stadium: Fir Park; Attendance: 7,660; Referee: Michael McCurry

=== Scottish League Cup ===
18 August 1999 Second Round	East Fife	0–1 (a.e.t.)	Motherwell	Methil
	Gibb (yellow card) 85' (yellow-red card); Johnston (yellow card) 116' (yellow-red card)		Halliday 97'	Stadium: Bayview Park; Attendance: 1,488; Referee: George Clyde

18 August 1999 Third Round	Motherwell	0–2	Ayr United	Motherwell
			Hurst 1'; Teale 70' (o.g.)	Stadium: Fir Park; Attendance: 4,893; Referee: Jim Herald

== Squad statistics ==
As of match played 23 May 1999

=== Appearances ===
No.	Pos	Nat	Player	Total		Premier League		Scottish Cup		League Cup	
No.	Pos	Nat	Player	Apps	Goals	Apps	Goals	Apps	Goals	Apps	Goals
1	GK	(Scotland) SCO	Stevie Woods	8	0	7	0	0	0	1	0
2	DF	(Scotland) SCO	Eddie May	14	0	10+2	0	0+1	0	1	0
3	DF	(Scotland) SCO	Stephen McMillan	33	2	30	2	3	0	0	0
4	DF	(England) ENG	Jamie McGowan	35	1	32	1	2	0	1	0
5	MF	(England) ENG	Ged Brannan	28	6	25	5	3	1	0	0
6	DF	(Scotland) SCO	Greig Denham	3	0	0+1	0	0	0	1+1	0
7	MF	(Scotland) SCO	Ian Ross	13	0	8+4	0	1	0	0	0
8	MF	(Finland) FIN	Simo Valakari	39	0	35	0	3	0	1	0
9	FW	(England) ENG	Stephen Halliday	6	1	2+2	0	0	0	2	1
10	MF	(England) ENG	Mark Gower	9	1	8+1	1	0	0	0	0
11	FW	(Scotland) SCO	Stevie Nicholas	7	1	1+6	1	0	0	0	0
15	DF	(England) ENG	Tony Thomas	11	1	10	0	1	1	0	0
16	MF	(Scotland) SCO	Billy Davies	1	0	0	0	0	0	1	0
18	MF	(Scotland) SCO	Lee McCulloch	32	4	14+13	3	3	1	2	0
19	DF	(Netherlands) NED	Michel Doesburg	34	0	29+1	0	3	0	1	0
20	MF	(Netherlands) NED	Rob Matthaei	19	0	14+3	0	0+1	0	1	0
21	DF	(Northern Ireland) NIR	Stephen Craigan	12	0	6+4	0	0+1	0	0+1	0
22	DF	(Scotland) SCO	Jered Stirling	7	1	4+1	1	0	0	1+1	0
23	MF	(Scotland) SCO	Dougie Ramsay	4	1	0+4	1	0	0	0	0
24	MF	(Scotland) SCO	Greg Miller	6	0	1+3	0	0	0	0+2	0
28	DF	(England) ENG	Shaun Teale	34	1	29	1	3	0	2	0
29	GK	(Scotland) SCO	Andy Goram	16	0	13	0	3	0	0	0
30	MF	(Scotland) SCO	Pat Nevin	33	0	14+16	0	2+1	0	0	0
39	MF	(Scotland) SCO	Derek Adams	29	3	11+15	3	1+2	0	0	0
40	FW	(Scotland) SCO	John Spencer	24	7	21	7	3	0	0	0
44	FW	(England) ENG	Don Goodman	8	1	8	1	0	0	0	0
Players away on loan:
	FW	(France) FRA	Hervé Bacqué	1	0	0+1	0	0	0	0	0
Players who appeared for Motherwell but left during the season:
10	MF	(Scotland) SCO	Brian McClair	13	0	8+3	0	0	0	2	0
11	FW	(Republic of Ireland) IRL	Owen Coyle	29	8	26	7	2	1	1	0
12	MF	(Netherlands) NED	Jan Michels	11	0	7+3	0	0	0	1	0
13	GK	(Finland) FIN	Mikko Kaven	17	0	16	0	0	0	1	0
14	DF	(Scotland) SCO	Kevin Christie	6	0	4+1	0	0	0	1	0
15	FW	(Netherlands) NED	Eliphas Shivute	1	0	0+1	0	0	0	0	0
29	FW	(Finland) FIN	Kai Nyyssönen	4	1	3	1	0	0	1	0

=== Goal scorers ===
Ranking	Nation	Position	Number	Name	Premier League	Scottish Cup	League Cup	Total
1	FW	(Republic of Ireland)	11	Owen Coyle	7	1	0	8
2	FW	(Scotland)	40	John Spencer	7	0	0	7
3	MF	(England)	5	Ged Brannan	5	1	0	6
4	MF	(Scotland)	18	Lee McCulloch	3	1	0	4
5	MF	(Scotland)	39	Derek Adams	3	0	0	3
6	DF	(Scotland)	3	Steve McMillan	2	0	0	2
8	FW	(England)	44	Don Goodman	1	0	0	1
8	MF	(England)	10	Mark Gower	1	0	0	1
8	DF	(England)	4	Jamie McGowan	1	0	0	1
8	FW	(Scotland)	11	Stevie Nicholas	1	0	0	1
8	FW	(Finland)	29	Kai Nyyssönen	1	0	0	1
8	MF	(Scotland)	23	Dougie Ramsay	1	0	0	1
8	DF	(Scotland)	22	Jered Stirling	1	0	0	1
8	DF	(England)	28	Shaun Teale	1	0	0	1
8	DF	(England)	15	Tony Thomas	0	1	0	1
8	FW	(England)	9	Stephen Halliday	0	0	1	1
8				Own goal	0	1	0	1
TOTALS					35	5	1	41

=== Disciplinary record ===
Number	Nation	Position	Name	Premier League		Scottish Cup		League Cup		Total	
Number	Nation	Position	Name	Yellow card	Red card	Yellow card	Red card	Yellow card	Red card	Yellow card	Red card
2	(Scotland)	DF	Eddie May	1	0	0	0	0	0	1	0
3	(Scotland)	DF	Stephen McMillan	5	1	0	0	0	0	5	1
4	(England)	DF	Jamie McGowan	2	0	0	0	0	0	2	0
5	(England)	MF	Ged Brannan	5	0	0	0	0	0	5	0
7	(Scotland)	MF	Ian Ross	2	0	0	0	0	0	2	0
8	(Finland)	MF	Simo Valakari	5	0	0	0	0	0	5	0
11	(Scotland)	FW	Stevie Nicholas	1	0	0	0	0	0	1	0
15	(England)	DF	Tony Thomas	2	1	1	0	0	0	3	1
18	(Scotland)	MF	Lee McCulloch	8	1	0	0	2	0	10	1
19	(Netherlands)	DF	Michel Doesburg	4	1	0	0	1	0	5	1
20	(Netherlands)	MF	Rob Matthaei	6	0	0	0	0	0	6	0
28	(England)	DF	Shaun Teale	3	1	1	0	0	0	4	1
39	(Scotland)	MF	Derek Adams	3	0	0	0	0	0	3	0
40	(Scotland)	FW	John Spencer	4	1	2	0	0	0	6	1
44	(England)	FW	Don Goodman	2	0	0	0	0	0	2	0
Players who left Motherwell during the season:
11	(Republic of Ireland)	FW	Owen Coyle	4	0	0	0	0	0	4	0
12	(Netherlands)	MF	Jan Michels	2	0	0	0	0	0	2	0
14	(Scotland)	DF	Kevin Christie	1	0	0	0	0	0	1	0
29	(Finland)	FW	Kai Nyyssönen	1	0	0	0	0	0	1	0
			TOTALS	61	6	4	0	3	0	68	6

== See also ==
- List of Motherwell F.C. seasons
