= 1999–2000 Motherwell F.C. season =

Motherwell
1999–2000 season
- Chairman: John Boyle
- Manager: Billy Davies
- Premier League: 4th
- Scottish Cup: Fourth round vs Ayr United
- League Cup: Quarterfinal vs Dundee United
- Top goalscorer: League: John Spencer (11); All: Lee McCulloch (12)
Home colours

The 1999–2000 season was Motherwell's 2nd season in the Scottish Premier League, and their 15th consecutive season in the top division of Scottish football.

== Squad ==
As of match played 21 May 2000

No.	Name	Nationality	Position	Date of birth (age)	Signed from	Signed in	Contract ends	Apps.	Goals
Goalkeepers
1	Andy Goram	(Scotland)	GK	13 April 1964 (aged 36)	Sheffield United	1999		44	0
17	Stevie Woods	(Scotland)	GK	23 February 1970 (aged 30)	Preston North End	1994			
29	Michael Brown	(Scotland)	GK	7 November 1979 (aged 20)	Youth team	1999		0	0
Defenders
3	Steve McMillan	(Scotland)	DF	19 January 1976 (aged 24)	Troon	1993			
4	Jamie McGowan	(England)	DF	5 December 1970 (aged 29)	Falkirk	1998		51	1
14	Stephen Craigan	(Northern Ireland)	DF	29 October 1976 (aged 23)	Blantyre Victoria	1995			
15	Tony Thomas	(England)	DF	12 July 1971 (aged 28)	Everton	1998		20	1
18	Greig Denham	(Scotland)	DF	5 October 1976 (aged 23)	Youth team	1994			
25	Steven Hammell	(Scotland)	DF	18 February 1982 (aged 18)	Youth team	1999		4	0
40	Benito Kemble	(Suriname)	DF	27 August 1968 (aged 31)	NEC Nijmegen	1999		26	1
42	Martyn Corrigan	(Scotland)	DF	14 August 1977 (aged 22)	Falkirk	2000		19	1
44	Greg Strong	(England)	DF	5 September 1975 (aged 24)	on loan from Bolton Wanderers	2000		10	0
Midfielders
5	Ged Brannan	(England)	MF	15 January 1972 (aged 28)	Manchester City	1994			
8	Simo Valakari	(Finland)	MF	28 April 1973 (aged 27)	FinnPa	1996			
9	Lee McCulloch	(Scotland)	MF	14 May 1978 (aged 22)	Youth team	1994		117	18
13	Pat Nevin	(Scotland)	MF	6 September 1963 (aged 36)	Kilmarnock	1998		67	2
20	Rob Matthaei	(Netherlands)	MF	20 September 1966 (aged 33)	Volendam	1998		22	0
21	Paul Harvey	(Scotland)	MF	28 August 1968 (aged 31)	Queen of the South	1999		14	0
22	Keith Lasley	(Scotland)	MF	21 September 1979 (aged 20)	Youth team	1998		0	0
26	John Davies	(Scotland)	MF	25 September 1966 (aged 33)	Ayr United	1999		10	0
27	Derek Townsley	(England)	MF	21 January 1973 (aged 27)	Queen of the South	1999		31	2
28	Kevin Twaddle	(Scotland)	MF	31 October 1971 (aged 28)	Greenock Morton	1999		28	5
43	Saša Ćurčić	(Federal Republic of Yugoslavia)	MF	28 August 1968 (aged 31)	New York/New Jersey MetroStars	2000		5	0
Forwards
7	John Spencer	(Scotland)	FW	11 September 1970 (aged 29)	Everton	1999		57	18
10	Don Goodman	(England)	FW	9 May 1966 (aged 34)	Sanfrecce Hiroshima	1999		43	11
11	Stevie Nicholas	(Scotland)	FW	8 July 1981 (aged 18)	Stirling Albion	1998		32	2
Out on loan
12	Derek Adams	(Scotland)	MF	25 June 1975 (aged 24)	Ross County	1998		46	4
19	Stephen Halliday	(England)	FW	3 May 1976 (aged 24)	Hartlepool United	1998		14	2
23	Dougie Ramsay	(Scotland)	MF	26 April 1979 (aged 21)	Youth team	1998		6	1
Left during the season
2	Michel Doesburg	(Netherlands)	DF	10 August 1968 (aged 31)	AZ Alkmaar	1998		60	0
6	Shaun Teale	(England)	DF	10 March 1964 (aged 36)	Tranmere Rovers	1998		55	2

== Transfers ==
=== In ===
Date	Position	Nationality	Name	From	Fee	Ref
1 June 1999	MF	(England)	Kevin Twaddle	Greenock Morton	Undisclosed	
10 June 1999	MF	(England)	Derek Townsley	Queen of the South	Undisclosed	
1 July 1999	FW	(England)	Don Goodman	Sanfrecce Hiroshima	Undisclosed	
22 October 1999	DF	(Suriname)	Benito Kemble	NEC Nijmegen	Free	
22 October 1999	MF	(Scotland)	Paul Harvey	Queen of the South	£100,000	
29 October 1999	MF	(Scotland)	John Davies	Ayr United	Undisclosed	
21 January 2000	DF	(Scotland)	Martyn Corrigan	Falkirk	Undisclosed	
16 March 2000	MF	(Federal Republic of Yugoslavia)	Saša Ćurčić	New York/New Jersey MetroStars	Undisclosed	

=== Loans in ===
Date from	Position	Nationality	Name	From	Date to	Ref.
16 March 2000	DF	(England)	Greg Strong	Bolton Wanderers	End of season	

=== Loans out ===
Date from	Position	Nationality	Name	To	Date to	Ref.
16 December 1999	MF	(Scotland)	Dougie Ramsay	Stranraer	16 January 2000	
October 1999	MF	(Scotland)	Derek Adams	Ayr United	End of season	
1 January 2000	FW	(England)	Stephen Halliday	Carlisle United	End of season	
24 March 2000	DF	(Netherlands)	Michel Doesburg	Dunfermline Athletic	End of season	

=== Released ===
Date	Position	Nationality	Name	Joined	Date	Ref.
4 February 2000	DF	(England)	Shaun Teale	Carlisle United		
31 May 2000	DF	(Netherlands)	Michel Doesburg	Dunfermline Athletic		
31 May 2000	FW	(England)	Stephen Halliday	Doncaster Rovers		

== Competitions ==
=== Overview ===
Competition	First match	Last match	Starting round	Final position	Record							
Competition	First match	Last match	Starting round	Final position	Pld	W	D	L	GF	GA	GD	Win %
Premier League	31 July 1999	21 May 2000	Matchday 1	4th	36	14	10	12	49	63	−14	38.89
Scottish Cup	1 February 2000	26 February 2000	Third round	Fourth round	3	1	1	1	6	5	+1	33.33
League Cup	18 August 1999	1 December 1999	Second round	Fourth round	3	1	1	1	5	5	+0	33.33
Total					42	16	12	14	60	73	−13	38.10

Last updated: 21 May 2000
Source: Soccerway

=== Premier League ===
==== League table ====
Pos	Team	Pld	W	D	L	GF	GA	GD	Pts	Qualification or relegation
2	Celtic	36	21	6	9	90	38	+52	69	Qualification for the UEFA Cup qualifying round
3	Heart of Midlothian	36	15	9	12	47	40	+7	54	Qualification for the UEFA Cup qualifying round
4	Motherwell	36	14	10	12	49	63	−14	52	
5	St Johnstone	36	10	12	14	36	44	−8	42	
6	Hibernian	36	10	11	15	49	61	−12	41	

Updated to match(es) played on end of season. Source: Scottish Professional Football League
Rules for classification: 1) Points; 2) Goal difference; 3) Goals scored

==== Results summary ====
Overall								Home						Away					
Pld	W	D	L	GF	GA	GD	Pts	W	D	L	GF	GA	GD	W	D	L	GF	GA	GD
36	14	10	12	49	63	−14	52	8	3	7	27	34	−7	6	7	5	22	29	−7

pen

Source: Fir Park Corner

==== Results by round ====
Round	1	2	3	4	5	6	7	8	9	10	11	12	13	14	15	16	17	18	19	20	21	22	23	24	25	26	27	28	29	30	31	32	33	34	35	36
Ground	A	H	A	A	H	A	H	H	A	A	H	A	A	H	H	A	H	A	A	H	A	H	H	H	A	A	H	A	A	H	H	A	H	H	A	H
Result	D	D	L	W	L	D	D	L	W	W	W	D	W	W	W	D	L	D	D	L	W	L	L	W	L	D	W	L	L	W	L	L	D	W	W	W
Position	5	6	9	5	7	8	9	9	7	5	4	5	4	4	4	3	4	4	4	4	3	3	3	3	4	4	4	4	4	4	4	4	4	4	4	4

Source: Fir Park Corner
A = Away; H = Home; W = Win; D = Draw; L = Loss

==== Results ====
31 July 1999 1	Hibernian	2–2	Motherwell	Easter Road
	Lehmann 45', 81'		Nevin 65'; Nicholas 90'	Attendance: 13,058; Referee: Kenny Clark

7 August 1999 2	Motherwell	2–2	Dundee United	Fir Park
	McCulloch 17', 36'; Goodman (yellow card) 90' (yellow-red card)		Dodds 69' (pen.); Ferraz 80'	Attendance: 6,791; Referee: Alan Freeland

15 August 1999 3	Rangers	4–1	Motherwell	Ibrox
	Mols 41', 45', 69', 80'		McCulloch 90'	Attendance: 45,264; Referee: Jim McCluskey

21 August 1999 4	Kilmarnock	0–1	Motherwell	Rugby Park
			Adams 33'	Attendance: 7,732; Referee: Eric Martindale

28 August 1999 5	Motherwell	0–2	Dundee	Fir Park
			Annand 16'; Falconer 83'	Attendance: 6,278; Referee: Alan Freeland

11 September 1999 6	St Johnstone	1–1	Motherwell	McDiarmid Park
	Thomas 25'		Spencer 61'	Attendance: 5,467; Referee: Jim McCluskey

16 October 1999 7	Motherwell	2–2	Hibernian	Fir Park
	McCulloch 32'; McMillan 67'		Latapy 9' (pen.); Paatelainen 57'	Attendance: 7,559; Referee: Eric Martindale

20 October 1999 8	Motherwell	5–6	Aberdeen	Fir Park
	Spencer 19', 65', 71'; Goodman 44'; Teale 79' (pen.)		Dow 3'; Winters 8', 25', 59'; Jess 39'; Bernard 68'	Attendance: 5,009

23 October 1999 9	Dundee United	0–2	Motherwell	Tannadice
			Spencer 45'; Teale 69' (pen.)	Attendance: 6,213; Referee: Michael McCurry

27 October 1999 10	Celtic	0–1	Motherwell	Celtic Park
			Twaddle 13'; Teale (red card) 34'	Attendance: 58,731

30 October 1999 11	Motherwell	1–0	St Johnstone	Fir Park
	Twaddle 9'			Attendance: 6,172; Referee: George Clyde

6 November 1999 12	Hearts	1–1	Motherwell	Tynecastle
	McSwegan 8'		Twaddle 83'	Attendance: 12,514; Referee: Alan Freeland

20 November 1999 13	Dundee	0–1	Motherwell	Dens Park
	Banger (red card) 81'		McCulloch 45'	Attendance: 4,340; Referee: Martin Clark

23 November 1999 14	Motherwell	2–1	Hearts	Fir Park
	McCulloch 24'; Nevin 90'		Rousett (red card) 81'; McSwegan 46'	Attendance: 7,850; Referee: John Rowbotham

28 November 1999 15	Motherwell	3–2	Celtic	Fir Park
	Brannan 9'; Townsley 44'; Goodman 49'		Berkovic 20'; Viduka 26' (pen.)	Attendance: 12,775; Referee: Jim McCluskey

11 December 1999 16	Hibernian	2–2	Motherwell	Easter Road
	Paatelainen 63'; McGinlay 88'		Spencer 70', 89'	Attendance: 9,955; Referee: George Simpson

18 December 1999 17	Motherwell	1–5	Rangers	Fir Park
	Goodman 88'		Kanchelskis 25', 57'; Amoruso 34'; Dodds 45', 49'	Attendance: 13,102; Referee: Bobby Orr

22 January 2000 18	St Johnstone	1–1	Motherwell	McDiarmid Park
	Jones 44'		McMillan 85'	Attendance: 4,158; Referee: Tom Brown

26 January 2000 19	Aberdeen	1–1	Motherwell	Pittodrie
	Zerouali 90'		Spencer 22'	Attendance: 10,314; Referee: Kenny Clark

5 February 2000 20	Motherwell	0–3	Dundee	Fir Park
			Robertson 49'; Rae 66'; Grady 89' (pen.)	Attendance: 5,865; Referee: Willie Young

12 February 2000 21	Kilmarnock	0–2	Motherwell	Rugby Park
			Goodman (yellow card) 53' (yellow-red card); Spencer 66'; McMillan 73'	Attendance: 7,057; Referee: John Rowbotham

22 February 2000 22	Motherwell	0–4	Kilmarnock	Fir Park
			Cocard 28', 42'; Vareille 85', 90'	Attendance: 5,813; Referee: Willie Young

1 March 2000 23	Motherwell	0–2	Hearts	Fir Park
			Jackson 45'; Wales 59'	Attendance: 5,588; Referee: Jim McCluskey

4 March 2000 24	Motherwell	1–0	Aberdeen	Fir Park
	Goodman 53'			Attendance: 7,538; Referee: Stuart Dougal

18 March 2000 25	Rangers	6–2	Motherwell	Ibrox
	Wallace 20', 42', 70'; Rozental 29' (pen.); Albertz 35'; Tugay 90' (pen.)		Kemble 18'; McCulloch 41'	Attendance: 49,622; Referee: John Rowbotham

25 March 2000 26	Hearts	0–0	Motherwell	Tynecastle
				Attendance: 13,102; Referee: Michael McCurry

1 April 2000 27	Motherwell	2–1	St Johnstone	Fir Park
	Brannan 76' (pen.); Corrigan 89'		Russell 45'; Jones (red card) 76'	Attendance: 5,900; Referee: George Simpson

5 April 2000 28	Celtic	4–0	Motherwell	Celtic Park
	Johnson 9', 75'; Berkovic 32'; Blinker 76'			Attendance: 46,862; Referee: Stuart Dougal

8 April 2000 29	Dundee	4–1	Motherwell	Dens Park
	Grady 52', 54'; Grady (yellow card) 61' (yellow-red card); Billio 81' (pen.); Luna 86'		Goodman 15'; McGowan (red card) 53'	Attendance: 4,701; Referee: Douglas McDonald

16 April 2000 30	Motherwell	2–0	Kilmarnock	Fir Park
	Brannan 21'; McCulloch 56'			Attendance: 5,429; Referee: John Rowbotham

19 April 2000 31	Motherwell	1–3	Dundee United	Fir Park
	McCulloch 22'		Mathie 46'; Hannah 81'; De Vos 83'	Attendance: 4,271; Referee: Michael McCurry

22 April 2000 32	Aberdeen	2–1	Motherwell	Pittodrie
	Dow 32'; Solberg 83'		Brannan 41' (pen.)	Attendance: 9,348; Referee: Tom Brown

29 April 2000 33	Motherwell	1–1	Celtic	Fir Park
	Brannan 45'		Burchill 15'	Attendance: 8,115; Referee: Jim McCluskey

6 May 2000 34	Motherwell	2–0	Hibernian	Fir Park
	Twaddle 70', 73'			Attendance: 5,426; Referee: George Clyde

13 May 2000 35	Dundee United	1–2	Motherwell	Tannadice
	McCracken (red card) 28'; Hamilton 37' (pen.)		Goodman 31', 78'	Attendance: 5,908; Referee: Stuart Dougal

21 May 2000 36	Motherwell	2–0	Rangers	Fir Park
	Twaddle 64'; Spencer 71'			Referee: Michael McCurry

=== Scottish Cup ===
1 February 2000 Third round	Arbroath	1–1	Motherwell	Arbroath
	Bryce 35'	[ Report]	Goodman 24'	Stadium: Gayfield; Attendance: 2,509; Referee: Michael McCurry

19 February 2000 Third round replay	Motherwell	2–0	Arbroath	Motherwell
	Goodman 13'; McCulloch 61'	[ Report]		Stadium: Fir Park; Attendance: 5,311; Referee: Michael McCurry

26 February 2000 Fourth round	Motherwell	3–4	Ayr United	Motherwell
	McCulloch 22'; Goodman 25'; Brannan 35' (pen.)	[ Report]	Teale 8' (pen.), 31'; Tarrant 39', 59'; Reynolds (yellow card) 63' (yellow-red card)	Stadium: Fir Park; Attendance: 5,222; Referee: Martin Clark

=== League Cup ===
18 August 1999 Second Round	Raith Rovers	2–2 (4–5 p)	Motherwell	Kirkcaldy
	Burns 75'; Dargo 85'	[ Report]	Browne 5' (o.g.); Halliday 74'	Stadium: Stark's Park; Attendance: 2,393; Referee: Ian Fyfe

12 October 1999 Third Round	Inverness CT	0–1	Motherwell	Inverness
		[ Report]	McCulloch 48'	Stadium: Caledonian Stadium; Attendance: 2,195; Referee: Stuart Dougal

1 December 1999 Fourth Round	Dundee United	3–2	Motherwell	Dundee
	Dodds 26' (pen.); Easton 42'; Thompson 84'; Hannah (red card) 88'	[ Report]	Townsley 51'; Teale 86' (pen.)	Stadium: Tannadice; Attendance: 5,086

== Squad statistics ==
As of match played 21 May 2000

=== Appearances ===
No.	Pos	Nat	Player	Total		Premier League		Scottish Cup		League Cup	
No.	Pos	Nat	Player	Apps	Goals	Apps	Goals	Apps	Goals	Apps	Goals
1	GK	(Scotland) SCO	Andy Goram	28	0	22	0	4	0	2	0
3	DF	(Scotland) SCO	Stephen McMillan	38	3	32	3	3	0	3	0
4	DF	(England) ENG	Jamie McGowan	16	0	10+3	0	2	0	1	0
5	MF	(England) ENG	Ged Brannan	40	6	34	5	3	1	3	0
7	FW	(Scotland) SCO	John Spencer	33	11	26+3	11	1	0	2+1	0
8	MF	(Finland) FIN	Simo Valakari	36	0	29+2	0	3	0	2	0
9	MF	(Scotland) SCO	Lee McCulloch	34	12	29+1	9	3	2	1	1
10	FW	(England) ENG	Don Goodman	35	10	25+4	7	3	3	2+1	0
11	FW	(Scotland) SCO	Stevie Nicholas	25	1	2+19	1	1+2	0	0+1	0
13	MF	(Scotland) SCO	Pat Nevin	34	2	7+22	2	0+2	0	2+1	0
14	DF	(Northern Ireland) NIR	Stephen Craigan	7	0	3+1	0	2	0	0+1	0
15	DF	(England) ENG	Tony Thomas	9	0	7	0	0	0	2	0
17	GK	(Scotland) SCO	Stevie Woods	16	0	14+1	0	0	0	1	0
18	DF	(Scotland) SCO	Greig Denham	9	0	6	0	3	0	0	0
20	MF	(Netherlands) NED	Rob Matthaei	3	0	2+1	0	0	0	0	0
21	MF	(Scotland) SCO	Paul Harvey	14	0	6+8	0	0	0	0	0
25	DF	(Scotland) SCO	Steven Hammell	4	0	3+1	0	0	0	0	0
26	MF	(Scotland) SCO	John Davies	10	0	7+1	0	1+1	0	0	0
27	MF	(England) ENG	Derek Townsley	31	2	17+8	1	2+1	0	3	1
28	MF	(Scotland) SCO	Kevin Twaddle	28	5	18+6	5	2+1	0	1	0
40	DF	(Netherlands) NED	Benito Kemble	26	1	25	1	0	0	1	0
42	DF	(Scotland) SCO	Martyn Corrigan	19	1	18+1	1	0	0	0	0
43	MF	(Federal Republic of Yugoslavia) YUG	Sasa Curcic	5	0	3+2	0	0	0	0	0
44	DF	(England) ENG	Greg Strong	10	0	10	0	0	0	0	0
Players away on loan:
2	DF	(Netherlands) NED	Michel Doesburg	26	0	18+2	0	3	0	3	0
12	MF	(Scotland) SCO	Derek Adams	17	1	15+1	1	0	0	1	0
19	FW	(England) ENG	Stephen Halliday	8	1	1+4	0	0	0	1+2	1
23	MF	(Scotland) SCO	Dougie Ramsay	2	0	0+2	0	0	0	0	0
Players who appeared for Motherwell but left during the season:
6	DF	(England) ENG	Shaun Teale	21	1	17+2	0	0	0	2	1

=== Goal scorers ===
Ranking	Nation	Position	Number	Name	Premier League	Scottish Cup	League Cup	Total
1	MF	(Scotland)	9	Lee McCulloch	9	2	1	12
2	FW	(Scotland)	7	John Spencer	11	0	0	71
3	FW	(England)	44	Don Goodman	7	3	0	10
4	MF	(England)	5	Ged Brannan	5	1	0	6
5	MF	(Scotland)	28	Kevin Twaddle	5	0	0	5
6	DF	(Scotland)	3	Steve McMillan	3	0	0	3
6	DF	(England)	6	Shaun Teale	2	0	1	3
8	MF	(Scotland)	13	Pat Nevin	2	0	0	2
8	MF	(England)	27	Derek Townsley	1	0	1	2
10	MF	(Scotland)	39	Derek Adams	1	0	0	1
10	DF	(Scotland)	42	Martyn Corrigan	1	0	0	1
10	DF	(Suriname)	40	Benito Kemble	1	0	0	1
10	FW	(Scotland)	11	Stevie Nicholas	1	0	0	1
10	FW	(England)	19	Stephen Halliday	0	0	1	1
10				Own goal	0	0	1	1
TOTALS					49	6	5	60

=== Disciplinary record ===
Number	Nation	Position	Name	Premier League		Scottish Cup		League Cup		Total	
Number	Nation	Position	Name	Yellow card	Red card	Yellow card	Red card	Yellow card	Red card	Yellow card	Red card
1	(Scotland)	GK	Andy Goram	1	0	0	0	0	0	1	0
3	(Scotland)	DF	Steve McMillan	4	0	1	0	0	0	5	0
4	(England)	DF	Jamie McGowan	4	1	0	0	1	0	5	1
5	(England)	MF	Ged Brannan	11	0	0	0	0	0	11	0
7	(Scotland)	FW	John Spencer	5	0	0	0	0	0	5	0
8	(Finland)	MF	Simo Valakari	3	0	0	0	0	0	3	0
9	(Scotland)	MF	Lee McCulloch	9	0	0	0	0	0	9	0
10	(England)	FW	Don Goodman	7	2	0	0	0	0	7	2
14	(Northern Ireland)	DF	Stephen Craigan	1	0	0	0	0	0	1	0
18	(Scotland)	DF	Greig Denham	1	0	2	0	0	0	3	0
21	(Scotland)	MF	Paul Harvey	1	0	0	0	0	0	1	0
26	(Scotland)	MF	John Davies	3	0	0	0	0	0	3	0
27	(England)	MF	Derek Townsley	1	0	0	0	0	0	1	0
28	(Scotland)	MF	Kevin Twaddle	1	0	0	0	0	0	1	0
40	(Suriname)	DF	Benito Kemble	4	0	0	0	0	0	4	0
42	(Scotland)	DF	Martyn Corrigan	4	0	0	0	0	0	4	0
44	(England)	DF	Greg Strong	2	0	0	0	0	0	2	0
Players away on loan:
2	(Netherlands)	DF	Michel Doesburg	2	0	0	0	1	0	3	0
12	(Scotland)	MF	Derek Adams	3	0	0	0	0	0	3	0
Players who left Motherwell during the season:
6	(England)	DF	Shaun Teale	1	1	0	0	0	0	1	1
			TOTALS	68	4	3	0	2	0	73	4

== See also ==
- List of Motherwell F.C. seasons
