= Dougie Ramsay =

Scottish footballer and coach (born 1979)

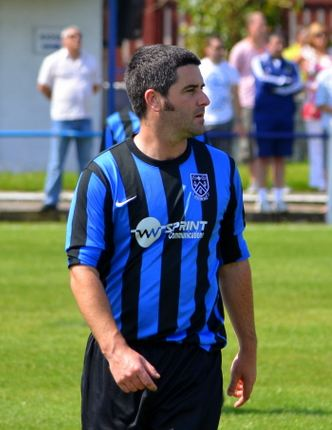
- Dougie Ramsay, Troon F.C. (July 2011)

Personal information
- Full name: Douglas Alexander Ramsay
- Date of birth: 26 April 1979 (age 47)
- Place of birth: Irvine, North Ayrshire, Scotland
- Position: Midfielder

Team information
- Current team: Troon

Youth career
- Bearsden Boys Club

Senior career*
Years	Team	Apps	(Gls)
1997–2003	Motherwell	42	(7)
1999	→ East Fife (loan)	1	(0)
1999-2000	→ Stranraer (loan)	5	(0)
2003–2006	Ayr United	79	(3)
2006–2007	Stranraer	27	(2)
2007–2008	Irvine Meadow XI		
2008–2010	Glenafton Athletic		
2010–2015	Troon		
2013	→ Maybole (loan)		

Managerial career
- 2009–2010: Glenafton Athletic
- 2014–2015: Troon
- 2020–: Troon
- * Club domestic league appearances and goals as of 11:22, 30 March 2020 (UTC)

Douglas Alexander Ramsay (born 26 April 1979, played in the Scottish Premier League for Motherwell. He is now a coach with Troon in the West of Scotland Football League

== Playing career ==
=== Motherwell ===
Irvine born Dougie joined Motherwell from Bearsden BC as a teenager in the summer of 1997 and came through the youth ranks at Motherwell.

In season 1998/99 Billy Davies gave him his debut when he came on as a sub against Dundee at Dens Park in February 1999, the game was lost 1–0. He did however make further appearances that season but they were confined to coming off the bench. His first goal for the club came at the end of the season when Motherwell defeated Dunfermline Athletic 2–1 at East End Park. In the 1999/00 campaign Ramsay found first team games limited to just two appearances, but he did have loan spells out at East Fife and Stranraer.

During season 2000/01 Motherwell sold key players such as Stephen McMillan, Lee McCulloch, John Spencer and Ged Brannan. This gave Dougie his chance and he started to be selected more often. In the 2001/02 season he was confined to just a solitary appearance until Eric Black departed after the club were placed into administration, Terry Butcher was named new manager and he made Ramsay a first team regular placing him at right-back instead of his usual midfield role. Ramsay put in a series of impressive displays against Kilmarnock (4-1 win) a 1–1 draw against Italian Serie A side Chievo and a 2–1 victory over Dundee which kept him in the side the following season. He played regularly during the 2002/03 season as the club fought through the threat of administration but he was released at the end of the season.

In total, he was six seasons at Fir Park and made 42 appearances for the club. He scored 7 goals - one of those a peach of a free kick when Motherwell beat 8 man Kilmarnock 3–0 at Rugby Park - the other 'Well scorers that day were James McFadden and Stephen Pearson.

He was released by manager Terry Butcher in June 2003.

=== Ayr United ===
After a spell training with St Mirren, Ramsay decided to join Ayr United for the 2003-04 season under Campbell Money and he spent three seasons at Somerset Park, making 79 appearances and scoring 3 goals.

Dougie was surprisingly released by new Manager Robert Connor in the summer of 2006.

=== Stranraer ===
Ramsay was signed by new Stranraer Manager Gerry Britton in 2006 for a second spell, after a brief loan there during his time as a youngster at Motherwell. It was turbulent times at Stair Park, as the club had just been relegated to the Second Division after big-spending days under Neil Watt. Stranraer finished in the relegation play-off place and were relegated after losing the play-off match to East Fife.

A solitary season clocked up another 27 senior appearances and 2 more goals.

=== Irvine Meadow XI ===
Ramsay dropped to Junior level with Irvine Meadow in May 2007

=== Glenafton Athletic ===
Ramsay joined Glenafton Athletic the following season, where he was signed by former Ayr United Manager Gordon Dalziel.

His former Stranraer Assistant Manager Derek Ferguson was appointed Manager in 2009 after Dalziel's departure, and he appointed Dougie as part of his coaching staff for their season in charge.

=== Troon ===
Ramsay joined Troon FC in 2010 with the Seasiders in the bottom division, and as Captain he led them to back-to-back promotions under Jimmy Kirkwood, taking them back into the top flight of Junior football once again.

Dougie suffered a badly broken arm in a match at Portland Park, which saw him miss quite a chunk of that campaign. He suffered a recurrence of the same injury in training which barred him from making a playing impact on their West of Scotland Super League Premier Division campaign.

== Coaching career ==
=== Glenafton Athletic ===
On 22 August 2009, Dougie was appointed a member of the coaching staff under new manager Derek Ferguson.

=== Troon ===
In May 2014, following a serious arm injury, Ramsay was appointed as Troon FC First Team Coach. Utilising his experience gained all through the leagues in Scottish football, Dougie played a very important role in guiding the side through their maiden Premier Division campaign before leaving his position due to work constraints in May 2015.

He returned to the club in May 2020 to form a coaching team with former team-mates Dean Keenan & Marty Fraser under Manager Jimmy Kirkwood.

== Career Statistics (Senior) ==
As of match played 30 March 2020

Appearances and goals by club, season and competition
Club	Season	League			National Cup		League Cup		Other		Total	
Club	Season	Division	Apps	Goals	Apps	Goals	Apps	Goals	Apps	Goals	Apps	Goals
Motherwell	1997–98	Scottish Premier League	0	0	0	0	0	0	0	0	0	0
Motherwell	1998-99	Scottish Premier League	4	1	0	0	0	0	0	0	4	1
Motherwell	1999–00	Scottish Premier League	2	0	0	0	0	0	0	0	2	0
Motherwell	2000–01	Scottish Premier League	10	0	0	0	0	0	0	0	10	0
Motherwell	2001–02	Scottish Premier League	3	0	0	0	0	0	0	0	3	0
Motherwell	2002–03	Scottish Premier League	20	1	1	0	2	0	0	0	23	1
Total			39	2	1	0	2	0	0	0	42	2
East Fife (loan)	1999-00	Scottish Third Division	1	0	0	0	0	0	0	0	1	0
Stranraer (loan)	1999–00	Scottish Second Division	4	0	1	0	0	0	0	0	5	0
Total			5	0	1	0	0	0	0	0	6	0
Ayr United	2003–04	Scottish First Division	0	0	0	0	0	0	0	0	0	0
Ayr United	2004–05	Scottish Second Division	0	0	0	0	0	0	0	0	0	0
Ayr United	2005–06	Scottish Second Division	0	0	0	0	0	0	0	0	0	0
Total			75	3	5	0	6	0	2	0	88	3
Stranraer	2006–07	Scottish Second Division	22	1	2	1	1	0	2	0	27	2
Career total			141	6	9	1	9	0	4	0	163	7
