= List of Motherwell F.C. records and statistics =

Motherwell Football Club is a Scottish professional association football club from the North Lanarkshire town of Motherwell, competing in the Scottish Premiership. This is an overview of all the statistics and records involving Motherwell since its official formation on 17 May 1886.

== Honours ==
Honour		Year(s)
Scottish Premier League	Runners-up	1994–95, 2012–13
Scottish Football League	Winners	1931–32
Scottish League First Division (Note: Second tier of the Scottish League)	Winners	1953–54, 1968–69, 1981–82, 1984–85
Scottish Cup	Winners	1951–52, 1990–91
Scottish Cup	Runners-up	1930–31, 1932–33, 1938–39, 1950–51, 2010–11, 2017–18
Scottish League Cup	Winners	1950–51
Scottish League Cup	Runners-up	1953–54, 2004–05, 2017-18
Scottish Qualifying Cup	Winners	1902
Scottish Qualifying Cup	Runners-up	1896, 1901
Summer Cup	Winners	1943-44, 1964–65
Lanarkshire League	Winners	1898–99
Lanarkshire Cup	Winners	1894–95, 1898–99, 1900–01, 1906–07, 1911–12, 1926–27, 1927–28, 1928–29, 1929–30, 1931–32, 1939–40, 1949–50, 1952–53, 1953–54, 1954–55, 1956–57, 1958–59, 1959–60, 1960–61, 1961–62, 1963–64, 1967–68, 1968–69, 1972–73, 1976–77, 1980–81, 1982–83, 1984–85, 1988–89, 1989–90, 1990–91
Lanarkshire Cup	Runners-up	1887-88, 1893–94, 1897–98, 1950–51, 1962–63, 1969–70
Lanarkshire Charity Cup	Winners	1917-18
Airdrie Charity Cup	Winners	1892-93
Wishaw Charity Cup	Winners	1913-14
West of Scotland League	Winners	1902-03

== Records and statistics ==
=== Firsts ===
- First match: Motherwell 3-2 Hamilton Academical (17 May 1886)
- First match played at Roman Road: Motherwell 3-2 Hamilton Academical (17 May 1886)
- First match played at Dalziel Park: Motherwell 3-3 Rangers (9 March 1889)
- First match played at Fir Park: Motherwell 1-8 Celtic (3 August 1895)
- First match played (as a professional side): Motherwell 4-1 Hamilton Academical (5 August 1893)
- First match played in league (as a professional side): Motherwell 4-1 Clyde (12 August 1893)
- First match played in Scottish Premier Division: Motherwell 1-1 Ayr United (30 August 1975)
- First match played in SPL: Motherwell 1-0 St Johnstone (1 August 1998)
- First match played in Scottish Premiership: Hibernian 0-1 Motherwell (4 August 2013)
- First match played in Scottish Cup: Cambuslang 6-1 Motherwell (11 September 1886)
- First match played in Scottish League Cup: Motherwell 0-1 Queen of the South (21 September 1946)
- First match played in Lanarkshire Cup (as Motherwell): Motherwell 3-3 Albion Rovers (20 November 1886) (Note: This was the first official match, since Motherwell were awarded a walkover in the previous round.)
- First match played in Texaco Cup/Anglo-Scottish Cup: Motherwell 1-0 Stoke City (14 September 1970)
- First win in SPL: Motherwell 1-0 St Johnstone (1 August 1998)
- First draw in SPL: Motherwell 1-1 Dunfermline Athletic (22 August 1998)
- First defeat in SPL: Rangers 2-1 Motherwell (15 August 1998)
- First win in Scottish Premiership: Hibernian 0-1 Motherwell (4 August 2013)
- First defeat in Scottish Premiership: Motherwell 1-3 Aberdeen (12 August 2013)
- First match played in Europe: 1991–92 European Cup Winners' Cup vs (Poland) GKS Katowice (18 September 1991) (Note: Motherwell in Europe)
- First goal scored in SPL: Jered Stirling vs St Johnstone (1 August 1998)
- First goal scored in Scottish Premiership: Henri Anier vs Hibernian (4 August 2013)
- First goal scored in Europe: Steve Kirk vs (Poland) GKS Katowice (1 October 1991)
- First hat-trick scored in SPL: John Spencer vs Aberdeen (20 October 1999)
- First hat-trick scored in Europe: Jamie Murphy vs (Albania) Flamurtari (23 July 2009)

=== Individual ===
- Most Capped player (Scotland): Stephen O'Donnell (25 caps)
- Most Capped player (Other): Stephen Craigan (54 caps for Northern Ireland) (Note: All but two were earned whilst playing for Motherwell)
- Youngest Player: Lennon Miller 16 years
- 5,000th SPL Goal: Scott McDonald versus Falkirk (Season 2005-2006)
- Most Clean Sheets in a season (All Competitions): Callum Ward

=== Appearances ===
- Most League appearances: Bob Ferrier, 626, 1917–1937
- Most League appearances since World War Two: Steven Hammell, 583, 1999–2006, 2008–2018
- Most SPL appearances: Steven Hammell, 399, 1999–2006, 2008–2013 (Note: Statistic correct as of 1 July 2013)
- Most Premiership appearances: John Sutton, 38, 2013–present (Note: Statistic correct as of 11 May 2014)
- Most European appearances: Steven Hammell, 19, 2008–present

=== Goals ===
- Most League goals: Hughie Ferguson, 284, 1916–1925
- Most League goals since World War Two: Pat Quinn, 83, 1955–1962
- Most League goals in a season: Willie MacFadyen, 52, 1931/1932 season
- Most SPL League goals: Scott McDonald, 42
- Most SPL League goals in a season: Michael Higdon, 26
- Total number of hat-tricks scored in the SPL: 9, 2012/2013 season
- Most hat-tricks scored in the SPL: Michael Higdon, 3
- Most hat-tricks scored in the SPL in a season: Michael Higdon, 2, 2012/2013 season
- Most Premiership League goals: Louis Moult, 39
- Most Premiership League goals in a season: John Sutton, 22
- Most European goals: Jamie Murphy, 7
- Most European goals in a season: Jamie Murphy, 4, 2009/2010 season

==== List of hat-tricks ====
The Result column shows the Motherwell score first.

As of match played 21 March 2026

Key
(X)	Number of times player scored a hat-trick (only for players with multiple hat-tricks)
4	Player scored four goals
5	Player scored five goals
6	Player scored six goals
	Motherwell lost the match
	Motherwell drew the match

#	Player	G	Against	Res.	Date	Competition	Home/Away/Neutral	Ref.
1	(Republic of Ireland) Tommy Coyne	3	Kilmarnock	4–2	16 November 1996	Premier Division	Away	
2	(Republic of Ireland) Owen Coyle	3	Greenock Morton	3–0	20 August 1997	League Cup	Home	
3	(Scotland) John Spencer	3	Aberdeen	5–6	20 October 1999	Premier League	Home	
4	(France) David Ferrère	3	Hibernian	4–0	9 February 2002	Premier League	Home	
5	(Scotland) James McFadden	3	Livingston	6–2	24 May 2003	Premier League	Home	
6	(Scotland) David Clarkson	3	Dundee United	3–1	3 January 2004	Premier League	Home	
7	(Republic of Ireland) Richie Foran	3	Queen's Park	3–0	20 September 2006	League Cup	Home	
8	(England) Chris Porter	3	Inverness Caledonian Thistle	3–2	27 December 2008	Premier League	Home	
9	(Scotland) Jamie Murphy	3	Flamurtari	8–1	23 July 2009	UEFA Europa League	Home	
10	(England) Nick Blackman	3	St Johnstone	4–0	10 November 2010	Premier League	Home	
11	(England) Michael Higdon	3	Hibernian	4–3	22 February 2012	Premier League	Home	
12	(England) Michael Higdon (2)	3	Inverness Caledonian Thistle	4–1	2 September 2012	Premier League	Home	
13	(England) Michael Higdon (3)	3	St Johnstone	3–2	20 January 2013	Premier League	Home	
14	(England) Louis Moult	4	Hamilton Academical	4–2	17 September 2016	Premiership	Home	
15	(England) Elliott Frear	3	Edinburgh City	5–0	17 July 2018	League Cup	Home	
16	(England) Chris Long	3	Dundee	3–0	18 January 2020	Scottish Cup	Away	
17	(Netherlands) Kevin van Veen	3	Inverness Caledonian Thistle	4–0	31 August 2022	League Cup	Away	
18	(Netherlands) Kevin van Veen (2)	3	Ross County	5–0	4 October 2022	Premiership	Away	

=== Scorelines ===
- Highest Scoring home win: 12-1 versus Dundee United, 1954 (Note: League Only)
- Highest Scoring away win: 8-1 versus Thistle, 1894
- Highest Scoring home draw: 6-6 versus Dumbarton, 1954 and Hibernian, 2010
- Highest Scoring away draw: 3-3 versus St Mirren, 2009 and Hearts, 2011
- Highest Scoring home loss: 0-7 versus Celtic, 1982
- Highest Scoring away loss: 0-8 versus Aberdeen, 1979
- Highest home aggregate: 8-5 versus Queen of the South, 1938
- Highest away aggregate: 8-3 versus Partick Thistle, 1971
- Highest Scoring home win in domestic cup football: 9-1 versus Falkirk, 1962 (Note: Scottish Cup and Scottish League Cup Only)
- Highest Scoring away win in domestic cup football: 8-1 versus Huntly, 1939
- Highest Scoring home draw in domestic cup football: 4-4 versus Clyde, 1960
- Highest Scoring away draw in domestic cup football: 5-5 versus Aberdeen, 1953
- Highest Scoring home loss in domestic cup football: 0-6 versus Celtic, 1984
- Highest Scoring away loss in domestic cup football: 7-1 versus Morton, 1898
- Highest home aggregate in domestic cup football: 8-3 versus Kilmarnock, 1933 and Albion Rovers, 1948
- Highest away aggregate in domestic cup football: 6-5 versus Airdriehill, 1889
- Highest Scoring European home win: 8-1 Versus (Albania) Flamurtari, 2009
- Highest Scoring European away win: 4-1 Versus (Faroe Islands) HB Tórshavn, 1994
- Highest Scoring European away draw: 1-1 Versus (Norway) Aalesunds, 2010
- Highest Scoring European home loss: 1-3 Versus (Finland) MYPA, 1995 and (Romania) Steaua București, 2009
- Highest Scoring European away loss: 0-3 Versus (Romania) Steaua București, 2009 and (Greece) Panathinaikos, 2012

=== Points ===
Most points in a season:

- Two for a win: 66 Season 1932-1933
- Three for a win: 70 Season 2013-2014

Fewest points in a season:

- Two for a win: 15 Season 1983-1984
- Three for a win: 28 Season 2002-2003

=== Sequences ===
- Longest sequence of wins: 12, 1968
- Longest sequence of draw: 5, 1975 and 1988
- Longest sequence of defeats: 9, 1979
- Longest sequence of clean sheets: 7, 1996
- Longest run of games without scoring a goal: 8, 1995-1996
- Longest run of games without a win: 19, 1988
- Longest run of games without a draw: 34, 1953-1954
- Longest unbeaten run: 30, 1930
- Longest run of games without keeping a clean sheet: 35, 1905-1906
- Longest run of games scoring at least one goal: 56, 1932-1934

=== Basic Statistics ===
- Most wins in a single season (Top Flight): 30, 1931-1932
- Most draws in a single season (Top Flight): 17, 1977-1978
- Most defeats in a single season (Top Flight): 25, 1983-1984
- Fewest wins in a single season (Top Flight): 4, 1983-1984
- Fewest defeats in a single season (Top Flight): 2, 1931-1932
- Most goals scored in a single season (Top Flight): 119, 1931-1932
- Fewest goals scored in a single season (Top Flight): 28, 1995-1996
- Most goals conceded in a single season (Top Flight): 86, 1938-1939, 1978-1979
- Fewest goals conceded in a single season (Top Flight): 31, 1931-1932
- Number of wins in European football: 9 (7 home, 2 away) (Note: Correct as of end of 2013-14 season.)
- Number of draws in European football: 1 (1 away)
- Number of defeats in European football: 18 (9 home, 9 away)
- Number of aggregate wins in European football: 5
- Number of aggregate defeats in European football: 9
- Total number of goals scored in European football: 32 (20 home, 12 away)
- Total number of goals conceded in European football: 37 (20 home, 17 away)
- Total number of clean sheets in European football: 6 (3 home, 3 away)
- Total number of games without scoring in European football: 15 (7 home, 8 away)
- Best performance in European football: play-offs, season 2010-2011 and 2012-13

=== All-time Statistics ===
- Total number of wins (SPL): 159 (Note: All-time SPL statistics)
- Total number of draws (SPL): 115
- Total number of defeats (SPL): 216
- Total number of goals scored (SPL): 592
- Total number of goals conceded (SPL): 744
- All-time goal difference (SPL): −147
- All-time points (SPL): 654
- All-time league placing (SPL): 6TH
- Total number of wins (Premiership): 22 (Note: All-time Premiership statistics)
- Total number of draws (Premiership): 4
- Total number of defeats (Premiership): 12
- Total number of goals scored (Premiership): 64
- Total number of goals conceded (Premiership): 60
- All-time goal difference (Premiership): +4
- All-time points (Premiership): 70
- All-time league placing (Premiership): 2ND

=== Lasts ===
- Last match played at Dalziel Park: Motherwell 3-2 Royal Albert (31 May 1895)
- Last match played in Scottish Football League Premier Division: Motherwell 1-2 Aberdeen (9 May 1998)
- Last goal scored in Scottish Football League Premier Division: Ian Ross vs Aberdeen (9 May 1998)
- Last match played in Scottish Premier League: St Johnstone 2-0 Motherwell (19 May 2013)
- Last goal scored in Scottish Premier League: Chris Humphrey vs Ross County (12 May 2013)
- Last match played outside the top-tier (Level 1) of Scottish Football: Forfar Athletic 0-0 Motherwell (11 May 1985)
- Last match played in Texaco Cup/Anglo-Scottish Cup: St Mirren 3-0 Motherwell (9 August 1978)

== Attendances ==
- Highest home attendance: 35,632 versus Rangers, 1952
- Highest home SPL attendance: 12,944 versus Celtic, 22 May 2005
- Lowest home SPL attendance: 2,818 versus Inverness C.T. 13 May 2009
- Highest home European attendance: 11,318 versus (France) AS Nancy, 2 October 2008
- Lowest home European attendance: 4,307 versus (Wales) Llanelli, 2 July 2009 (Note: Match was played at Excelsior Stadium, Airdrie)

== Transfer fees ==
- Highest transfer fee paid: £500,000 for John Spencer from Everton, 1999
- Highest transfer fee received: £3,000,000 for David Turnbull to Celtic, 2020

== See also ==
- List of Motherwell F.C. seasons

== Sources ==
- Jeffrey, Jim; Fry, Genge (2001). The Men Who Made Motherwell Football Club. Tempus Publishing. ISBN 978-0-7524-2191-9.
- Wilson, Derek (2008). Motherwell FC On This Day. Pitch Publishing. ISBN 978-1905411375.
- Wilson, Derek (2009). Motherwell FC Miscellany. Pitch Publishing. ISBN 978-1905411375.
