= Stephen Halliday =

Stephen Halliday may refer to:

- Stephen Halliday (footballer) (born 1976)
- Stephen Halliday (ice hockey) (born 2002)
