= Bacque =

Bacque or Bacqué is a surname. Notable people with the surname include:

- François Bacqué (born 1936), French bishop and Vatican diplomat
- Gene Bacque (1937–2019), American baseball player
- Hervé Bacqué (born 1976), French football player
- James Bacque (1929–2019), Canadian writer
- Odon Bacqué (born 1944), American politician and non-fiction writer
