= Michel Doesburg =

Dutch footballer (born 1968)

Personal information
- Full name: Michel Johannes Doesburg
- Date of birth: 10 August 1968 (age 58)
- Place of birth: Beverwijk, Netherlands
- Height: 1.80 m (5 ft 11 in)
- Position: Defender

Senior career*
Years	Team	Apps	(Gls)
1986–1990	Haarlem	74	(0)
1990–1992	Wageningen	65	(3)
1992–1995	Heerenveen	112	(2)
1996–1998	AZ	52	(0)
1998–2000	Motherwell	49	(0)
2000–2002	Dunfermline Athletic	41	(0)
2002–2003	FC Zwolle	36	(1)
Total		428	(6)

International career
1986	Netherlands U19	4	(0)
- * Club domestic league appearances and goals

Michel Johannes Doesburg (born 10 August 1968 in Beverwijk) is a retired Dutch professional football player.

== Club career ==
Doesburg played for several Dutch clubs before moving abroad when he joined compatriots Jan Michels and Rob Matthaei at Scottish side Motherwell in 1998, moving to Dunfermline Athletic in 2000. He returned to Holland in 2002, when he signed a half-year deal with FC Zwolle.

Doesburg was named chief scout at AZ in November 2015.

== International career ==
Doesburg played 4 games for the Netherlands national under-19 football team.
