= Simo Valakari =

Finnish footballer and coach (born 1973)

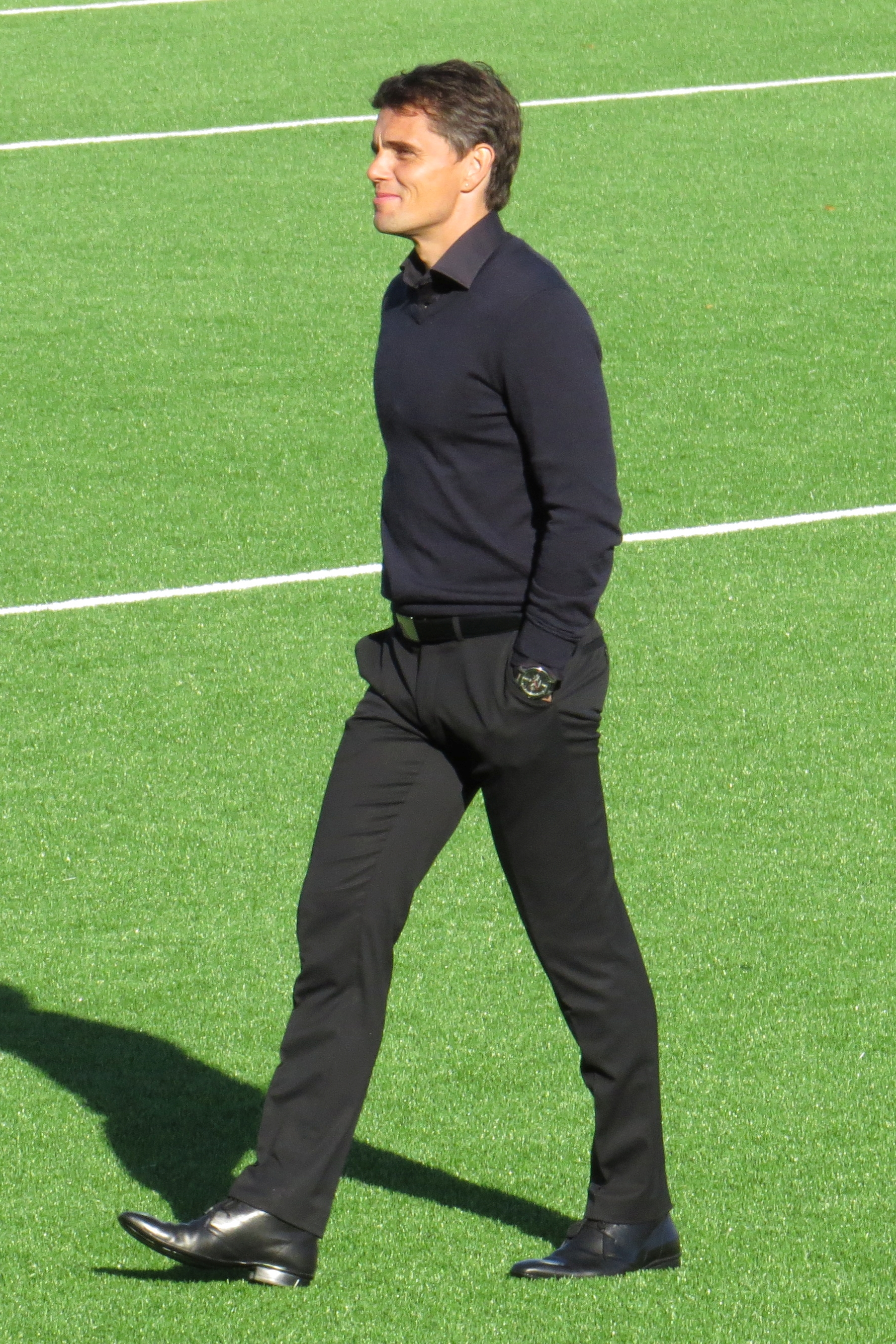
- Valakari in 2015

Personal information
- Full name: Simo Johannes Valakari
- Date of birth: 28 April 1973 (age 53)
- Place of birth: Helsinki, Finland
- Height: 1.80 m (5 ft 11 in)
- Position: Midfielder

Team information
- Current team: St Johnstone (manager)

Youth career
- KäPa

Senior career*
Years	Team	Apps	(Gls)
1990	KäPa	16	(2)
1991–1994	Kontu	59	(7)
1995–1996	FinnPa	48	(5)
1996–2000	Motherwell	103	(0)
2000–2004	Derby County	46	(3)
2004–2006	FC Dallas (Note: "Dallas Burn" before name change to FC Dallas in 2005)	89	(1)
2007–2009	TPS	38	(1)
Total		399	(19)

International career
1996–2003	Finland	32	(0)

Managerial career
- 2010: ÅIFK
- 2012–2016: SJK
- 2017–2020: Tromsø
- 2021–2023: KuPS
- 2023: Auda
- 2023–2024: Riga FC
- 2024–: St Johnstone
- * Club domestic league appearances and goals

Simo Johannes Valakari (born 28 April 1973) is a Finnish football manager and a former international football player. He is currently the manager of Scottish Premiership side St Johnstone.

== Playing career ==
=== Club ===
Valakari played in the youth sector of Käpylän Pallo (KäPa) in Käpylä, Helsinki, and began his senior career with KäPa first team in 1990 in the fourth-tier Kolmonen. He played also for Kontula-based club KontU in the Finnish second-tier Ykkönen and third-tier Kakkonen, before first moving to Veikkausliiga club FinnPa in 1995 and then to Scottish Premier League club Motherwell in 1996. After four seasons in Scotland, he was off to Derby County in the Premier League.

Valakari failed to become a first team regular at Pride Park Stadium and decided to join Dallas Burn for the 2004 MLS season and finished the year with a goal and four assists. Following the 2006 season, his contract was not renewed with the team, known by that time as FC Dallas.

Valakari decided to return to Finland for the 2007 Veikkausliiga season, where he signed for TPS, managed by Mixu Paatelainen. He retired from playing in 2009 after several injuries.

=== International ===
Valakari was a regular with the Finnish national team during his stay in Europe. He made a total of 32 caps for his country.

== Managerial career ==
Valakari was named manager of Åbo IFK (ÅIFK) in January 2010 and subsequently ended his playing career. He, however returned "home" as he announced his return to Käpylän Pallo as a youth coach after the 2010 season.

=== SJK ===
In 2012, Valakari joined Seinäjoen Jalkapallokerho (SJK) as the head coach. In 2013, he managed the team to gain promotion to the Veikkausliiga and they went on to win the Finnish championship in 2015. The team also won the Finnish League Cup in 2014 and the Finnish Cup in 2016. In the early 2016, he had been linked with Motherwell, but eventually signed an upgraded contract extension with SJK on 10 February 2016. Valakari was dismissed on 17 February 2017, due to disagreement with the club's chairman Raimo Sarajärvi.

=== Tromsø ===
He was appointed head coach of Norwegian Eliteserien side Tromsø in June 2017. In 2018, his contract was extended until 2022, but he was fired in April 2020, after the club had suffered a relegation at the end of the 2019 season.

=== KuPS ===
In November 2020, Valakari was appointed as the head coach of Kuopion Palloseura (KuPS). Under Valakari, KuPS won two consecutive Finnish Cup titles in 2021 and 2022, and finished as the Veikkausliiga runner-up twice, falling just a one point short to HJK on both occasions. Valakari also led KuPS to the UEFA Europa Conference League qualifiers on two occasions. In 2021–22, the club reached to the (fourth) play-off round, but was knocked out by Union Berlin. Next year they reached to the 3rd round, where they eventually fell short to Young Boys. In the summer 2022, Valakari was rumoured for a head coach position of Motherwell, but eventually was not chosen.

His contract with KuPS was terminated by mutual consent on 13 January 2023.

=== Auda ===
Shortly after his contract termination with KuPS, it was announced that Valakari was named the head coach of Auda in Latvia for the 2023 season. Valakari was named The Virslīga Coach of the Month in September 2023. At the end of the season, Auda finished third in the league and won their first medal in the premier division, and also qualified for the UEFA Conference League qualifiers again.

=== Riga FC ===
On 13 December 2023, it was reported in Finnish media that Valakari is about to be named the new head coach of a fellow Latvian side Riga FC. On the next day, the club confirmed that they had appointed Valakari as the new head coach. On 2 March 2024, Valakari and Riga FC won the 2024 Latvian Supercup, beating RFS in the final on penalties. On 14 September, in a press conference after the match against Auda, Valakari hinted that he was not the one who had selected the starting line-up for the match. He left the club on 30 September, after Riga and St Johnstone had agreed on a fee for his contract. Prior to his departure, Riga FC were comfortably sitting in second place in the league table.

=== St Johnstone ===
On 1 October 2024, Valakari returned to Scotland when he was named the new manager of the Scottish Premiership club St Johnstone on a three-year deal, becoming the first foreign manager in the club's 140-year-history. Due to work visa issues, the first two matches he couldn't officially access the bench, but on 26 October, he managed St Johnstone as they beat Dundee 2–1 away at Dens Park. In April 2025, Valakari led the team to reach the semi-finals of the 2024–25 Scottish Cup. St Johnstone were relegated from the Scottish Premiership at the end of the 2024-25 season. Valakari stayed with the club and led them to start the 2025–26 Scottish Championship season with record-tying seven wins and one draw. He was named the Scottish Championship Manager of the Month consecutively for August and September 2025. Valakari led the Saints to win the Championship season and promotion back to the Premiership.

== Personal life ==
Valakari's three sons are also footballers. His oldest son Paavo is a former player and current coach, Onni is playing professionally for San Diego FC, and the youngest one Toivo plays for Käpylän Pallo in Helsinki, Finland.

Valakari meditates in his everyday life.

In January 2026, St Johnstone launched the club's own lager beer, Simo's Gold, which was named after head coach Valakari.

== Career statistics ==
=== Club ===
As of 31 December 2020

Appearances and goals by club, season and competition
Club	Season	League			National cup (Note: Includes Scottish Cup, FA Cup, U.S. Open Cup)		League cup (Note: Includes Scottish League Cup, Football League Cup, Finnish League Cup)		Total	
Club	Season	Division	Apps	Goals	Apps	Goals	Apps	Goals	Apps	Goals
KäPa	1990	Kolmonen	16	2	—		—		16	2
Kontu	1991	Ykkönen					—			
Kontu	1992	Kakkonen					—			
Kontu	1993	Ykkönen					—			
Kontu	1994	Ykkönen					—			
Kontu	Total		59	7			—		59	7
FinnPa	1995	Veikkausliiga	22	3	—		—		22	3
FinnPa	1996	Veikkausliiga	26	2	—		—		26	2
FinnPa	Total		48	5	0	0	0	0	48	5
Motherwell	1996–97	Scottish Premier Division	11	0					11	0
Motherwell	1997–98	Scottish Premier Division	27	0	2	0	2	0	31	0
Motherwell	1998–99	Scottish Premier League	35	0	3	0	1	0	39	0
Motherwell	1999–2000	Scottish Premier League	30	0	3	0	2	0	35	0
Motherwell	Total		103	0	8	0	5	0	116	0
Derby County	2000–01	Premier League	11	1	0	0	3	0	14	1
Derby County	2001–02	Premier League	9	0	0	0	1	0	10	0
Derby County	2002–03	First Division	6	2	0	0	0	0	6	2
Derby County	2003–04	First Division	20	0	0	0	1	0	21	0
Derby County	Total		46	3	0	0	5	0	51	3
FC Dallas	2004	MLS	26	1	3	0	—		29	1
FC Dallas	2005	MLS	30	0	3	0	—		33	0
FC Dallas	2006	MLS	33	0	2	0	—		35	0
FC Dallas	Total		89	1	8	0	—		97	1
TPS	2007	Veikkausliiga	25	0	0	0	0	0	25	0
TPS	2008	Veikkausliiga	6	1	0	0	0	0	6	1
TPS	2009	Veikkausliiga	7	0	0	0	3	0	10	0
TPS	Total		38	1	0	0	3	0	41	1
Career total			399	19	16	0	13	0	429	19

=== International ===
Appearances and goals by national team and year
National team	Year	Apps	Goals
Finland	1996	1	0
Finland	1997	3	0
Finland	1998	5	0
Finland	1999	5	0
Finland	2000	5	0
Finland	2001	0	0
Finland	2002	4	0
Finland	2003	9	0
Total		32	0

=== Managerial ===
As of match played 21 November 2026

Team	Nat	From	To	Record							
Team	Nat	From	To	P	W	D	L	GF	GA	GD	W%
SJK Seinäjoki	(Finland)	1 September 2012	17 February 2016	165	92	32	41	275	153	+122	55.76
Tromsø	(Norway)	27 July 2017	20 April 2020	81	31	11	39	126	136	−10	38.27
KuPS	(Finland)	1 January 2021	13 January 2023	83	52	18	13	153	80	+73	62.65
Auda	(Latvia)	16 January 2023	14 December 2023	40	17	11	12	50	49	+1	42.50
Riga FC	(Latvia)	14 December 2023	30 September 2024	36	25	6	5	86	26	+60	69.44
St Johnstone	(Scotland)	1 October 2024	Present	97	45	21	31	140	117	+23	46.39
Total				503	262	99	142	834	558	+276	52.09

== Honours ==
=== As a manager ===
SJK

- Veikkausliiga: 2015
- Finnish Cup: 2016
- Finnish League Cup: 2014

KuPS

- Finnish Cup: 2021, 2022

Riga FC

- Latvian Supercup: 2024

St Johnstone

- Scottish Championship: 2025–26

Individual

- Finnish Football Manager of the Year: 2015
- Veikkausliiga Manager of the Month: June 2014, October 2015
- Veikkausliiga Manager of the Year: 2015
- Virslīga Manager of the Month: September 2023
- Scottish Championship Manager of the Month: August 2025, September 2025
