= Mikko Kavén =

Finnish footballer (born 1975)

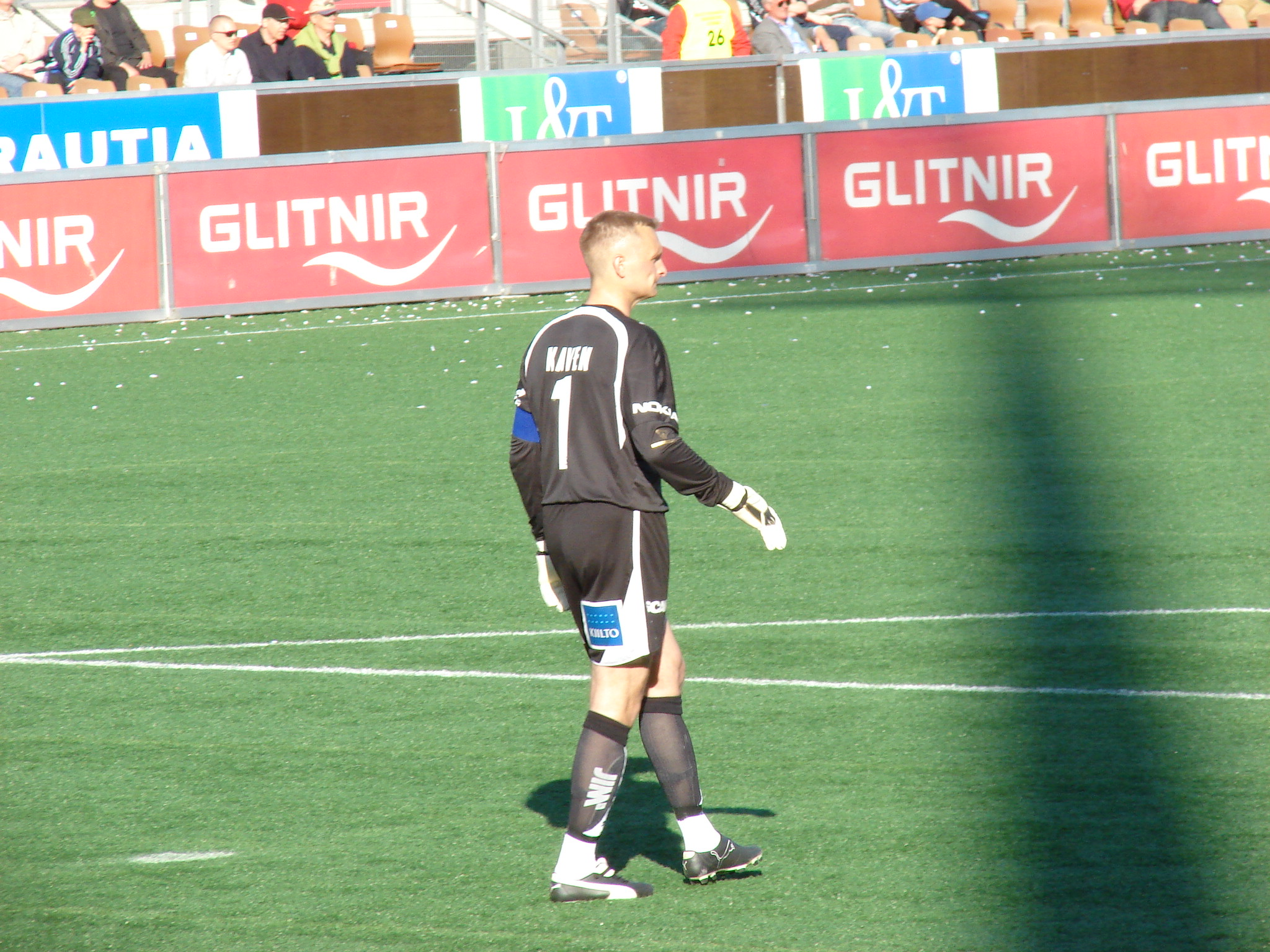
- Kavén with TamU in 2007

Personal information
- Full name: Mikko Juhani Kavén
- Date of birth: 19 February 1975 (age 51)
- Place of birth: Lahti, Finland
- Height: 1.89 m (6 ft 2 1/2 in)
- Position: Goalkeeper

Senior career*
Years	Team	Apps	(Gls)
1994–1996	Kuusysi	62	(0)
1997–1998	HJK	10	(0)
1998–1999	Motherwell	16	(0)
1999–2000	Vålerenga	7	(0)
2001–2010	Tampere United	231	(0)

International career^{‡}
2000– 2007	Finland	15	(0)

Managerial career
- 2011–2022: Ilves (gk coach)
- 2014: Finland U20 (gk coach)
- 2018–2022: Finland U21 (gk coach)
- * Club domestic league appearances and goals as of 2009 ‡ National team caps and goals as of 8 November 2009

Mikko Juhani Kavén (born 19 February 1975) is a retired Finnish football goalkeeper who used to play for Tampere United in Finland's Veikkausliiga.

He is currently acting as goalkeeping coach in Veikkausliiga side Ilves.

== Club career ==
Kavén has also played for Kuusysi and HJK Helsinki in Finland and for Motherwell F.C. in Scotland and Vålerenga I.F. in Norway.

In 1998, he was part of the HJK squad that qualified for the UEFA Champions League group stage.

== International career ==
Kavén played 15 times for Finnish national team before retiring from international games in January 2008.

== Career statistics ==
As of 1 September 2024.

Appearances and goals by club, season and competition
Club	Season	League			Cup (Note: Includes Suomen Cup)		League cup		Europe		Total	
Club	Season	Division	Apps	Goals	Apps	Goals	Apps	Goals	Apps	Goals	Apps	Goals
Kuusysi	1994	Veikkausliiga	18	0	–		–		–		18	0
Kuusysi	1995	Veikkausliiga	18	0	–		–		–		18	0
Kuusysi	1996	Ykkönen	26	0	–		–		–		26	0
Kuusysi	Total		62	0	0	0	0	0	0	0	62	0
HJK	1997	Veikkausliiga	5	0	–		–		0	0	5	0
HJK	1998	Veikkausliiga	5	0	–		–		0	0	5	0
HJK	Total		10	0	0	0	0	0	0	0	10	0
Motherwell	1998–99	Scottish Premier League	10	0	0	0	0	0	–		10	0
Vålerenga	1999	Tippeligaen	3	0	1	0	–		2 (Note: Appearances in UEFA Cup Winners' Cup)	0	6	0
Vålerenga	2000	Tippeligaen	4	0	0	0	–		–		4	0
Vålerenga	Total		7	0	1	0	0	0	2	0	10	0
Tampere United	2001	Veikkausliiga	33	0	1	0	–		–		34	0
Tampere United	2002	Veikkausliiga	29	0	0	0	–		1 (Note: Appearance(s) in UEFA Champions League)	0	30	0
Tampere United	2003	Veikkausliiga	26	0	–		–		6 (Note: Appearances in UEFA Cup)	0	32	0
Tampere United	2004	Veikkausliiga	26	0	–		–		6 (Note: Appearances in UEFA Intertoto Cup)	0	32	0
Tampere United	2005	Veikkausliiga	26	0	–		–		6	0	32	0
Tampere United	2006	Veikkausliiga	24	0	–		–		4	0	28	0
Tampere United	2007	Veikkausliiga	26	0	1	0	–		8 (Note: Appearances in UEFA Champions League and UEFA Cup)	0	35	0
Tampere United	2008	Veikkausliiga	26	0	1	0	–		4	0	31	0
Tampere United	2009	Veikkausliiga	15	0	4	0	6	0	–		25	0
Tampere United	2010	Veikkausliiga	12	0	–		–		–		12	0
Tampere United	Total		243	0	7	0	6	0	35	0	291	0
Career total			332	0	8	0	6	0	37	0	383	0

== Honours ==
Tampere United

- Veikkausliiga: 2001, 2006, 2007
- Finnish Cup: 2007

HJK

- Veikkausliiga: 1997

Individual

- Veikkausliiga Goalkeeper of the Year: 2001, 2004, 2005, 2006
