= John Davies (footballer, born 1966) =

Scottish footballer

Personal information
- Date of birth: 25 September 1966 (age 60)
- Place of birth: Glasgow, Scotland
- Height: 5 ft 7 in (1.70 m)
- Position: Midfielder

Youth career
- Anniesland United

Senior career*
Years	Team	Apps	(Gls)
1985–1990	Clydebank	122	(12)
1987	→ Jönköping (loan)		
1990–1994	St Johnstone	134	(10)
1994–1998	Airdrieonians	110	(13)
1998–1999	Ayr United	44	(3)
1999–2000	Motherwell	10	(0)
Total		420	(38)
- * Club domestic league appearances and goals

John Davies (born 25 September 1966) is a Scottish former professional footballer who played as a midfielder for Clydebank, Jönköping, St Johnstone, Airdrieonians, Ayr United and Motherwell. He won the Scottish Challenge Cup with Airdrie in 1994–95 and was a member of the squad when they reached the final of the Scottish Cup the same season, though took no part on the day.

Davies is the brother of Billy Davies and the brother-in-law of John Spencer, both former professional players and managers. Billy Davies signed both his brother and Spencer when boss of Motherwell in 1999.

He is also a FIFA qualified sports agent since 2006.

== Honours ==
Airdrieonians

- Scottish Challenge Cup: 1994–95
