= Kevin Twaddle =

Scottish footballer

Personal information
- Date of birth: 31 October 1971 (age 55)
- Place of birth: Edinburgh, Scotland
- Positions: Winger; forward

Youth career
- 1992–1994: Dunbar United

Senior career*
Years	Team	Apps	(Gls)
1994–1996	St Johnstone	51	(10)
1996–1998	Raith Rovers	32	(4)
1998–1999	Greenock Morton	46	(8)
1999–2002	Motherwell	71	(7)
2002	→ Ayr United (loan)	1	(0)
2002–2003	Heart of Midlothian	8	(0)
2003–2004	St Mirren	3	(0)
2004–2006	Penicuik Athletic		
- * Club domestic league appearances and goals as of 21:12, 2 October 2009 (UTC)

Kevin Twaddle (born 31 October 1971) is a Scottish former professional footballer.

A forward, Twaddle began his career with junior club Dunbar United where he made 45 appearances and scored 23 goals. He entered senior football when he signed for St Johnstone in 1994, having been a painter and decorator in Edinburgh, his hometown. He was given a trial by Saints manager Paul Sturrock, who liked what he saw in Twaddle's first game, against Dunfermline Athletic at East End Park, but stated that he needed to work on his fitness and aerial ability.

He remained at McDiarmid Park for two years, making 51 league appearances and finding the net on ten occasions. In 1996, he joined Raith Rovers in an £80,000 deal. He made 32 appearances for Rovers in two years, scoring four goals.

He moved to Morton in 1998 for a fee of £150,000, but his stay at Cappielow was brief. Scottish Premier League club Motherwell signed him later that year, also for £150,000. Twaddle signed for Heart of Midlothian, the club he supported as a boy, in June 2002. He only played eight league games for the Jambos in his twelve months with the Edinburgh side.

In 2003, he joined St Mirren, but again his stay was a short one, and he moved on after making only three appearances. Twaddle joined Scottish junior club Penicuik Athletic in the summer of 2004.

== Personal life ==
In 2012, Twaddle published an autobiography, Life on the Line, including details of his gambling addiction which cost him over £1 million; he has since campaigned for changes to the law surrounding gambling advertising.
