= Greig Denham =

Scottish footballer

Personal information
- Date of birth: 5 October 1976 (age 50)
- Place of birth: Glasgow, Scotland
- Position: Centre back

Youth career
- 1993–1994: Cumbernauld United

Senior career*
| Years | Team | Apps | (Gls) |
| 1994–2000 | Motherwell | 49 | (0) |
| 2000–2002 | Falkirk | 35 | (0) |
| 2002–2003 | St Mirren | 15 | (2) |
| 2003–2004 | Arbroath | 3 | (0) |
| 2004–2005 | East Stirlingshire | 16 | (0) |
| 2005–2006 | Stenhousemuir | 31 | (0) |

Managerial career
- 2022-2023: Rosyth
- * Club domestic league appearances and goals

Greig Denham (born 5 October 1976) is a Scottish former professional footballer who played as a defender for Stenhousemuir, East Stirlingshire, Falkirk, Motherwell and St Mirren. He was the head coach of Rosyth since September 2022 until August 2023 he resigned as head coach.

== Career ==
Denham started his career at junior outfit Cumbernauld United, before getting his chance in the Scottish top-flight with Motherwell. He was to spend 6 years at Fir Park before lack of appearances forced him to leave the club. He would spend the rest of his career in the Scottish lower leagues, playing for Falkirk, St Mirren, Arbroath, East Stirlingshire and Stenhousemuir before retiring in summer of 2006.

Greig is now the head coach of East of Scotland outfit Rosyth and was appointed the Rec's manager in September 2022.
