= Jered Stirling =

Scottish footballer

Personal information
- Date of birth: 13 October 1976 (age 50)
- Place of birth: Stirling, Scotland
- Position: Left back

Youth career
- St. Roch's

Senior career*
Years	Team	Apps	(Gls)
1994–1998	Partick Thistle	58	(13)
1998–1999	Motherwell	5	(1)
1999–2000	Waterford United	?	(?)
2000	Partick Thistle	4	(0)
2000	Forfar Athletic	8	(0)
2000–2001	Stranraer	7	(2)
2001	Albion Rovers	19	(2)
2001	Clydebank	1	(0)
2001	Swansea City	?	(?)
2002	Stranraer	13	(0)
2002–2005	Albion Rovers	98	(11)
2005	Ayr United	1	(0)
2005	Raith Rovers	2	(0)
2006	Elgin City	1	(0)
2006–2007	Montrose	28	(1)
?	Vale of Clyde	?	(?)
Total		245	(30)
- * Club domestic league appearances and goals

Jered Stirling (born 13 October 1976) is a Scottish footballer, who played in the Scottish Premier League for Motherwell. He also played for several clubs in the Scottish Football League, including Partick Thistle and Albion Rovers.
