= Stevie Nicholas =

Scottish footballer

Personal information
- Full name: Stephen Nicholas
- Date of birth: 8 July 1981 (age 45)
- Place of birth: Stirling, Scotland
- Position: Midfielder

Youth career
- Riverside B.C.

Senior career*
Years	Team	Apps	(Gls)
1997–1999	Stirling Albion	34	(4)
1999–2002	Motherwell	61	(5)
2002–2004	Stirling Albion	31	(11)
2004–2005	East Fife	36	(11)
2004	→ Northwich Victoria (loan)	12	(1)
2005	→ Alloa Athletic (loan)	7	(0)
2005–2006	Partick Thistle	22	(0)
2006–2007	Stranraer	18	(2)
2007–2008	East Fife	15	(2)
2008–2009	Queen's Park	17	(1)
2009–2010	Montrose	12	(0)
2011–2012	Stirling Albion	9	(0)
2012	→ Ballingry Rovers (loan)		
- * Club domestic league appearances and goals as of 22:37, 1 March 2012 (UTC)

Stephen "Stevie" Nicholas (born 8 July 1981, in Stirling) is a Scottish footballer.

Nicholas signed for Motherwell from Stirling Albion in 1999 for £100,000 and made his debut from the bench in a 1–1 draw with Aberdeen at Fir Park on 20 March. He scored his first goal for Motherwell on 15 May that year, scoring a 74th minute consolation in a 5–1 home defeat to Rangers.

Formerly seen as a star of the future at both Motherwell and Stirling Albion injury has since stunted Nicholas' career. He returned to Stirling Albion in 2002 and has since had spells at Alloa Athletic, Partick Thistle, Stranraer, East Fife, Queen's Park and Montrose.

He scored his first Queen's Park goal in a 2–1 loss to Raith Rovers on 6 December 2008.
