= Hervé Bacqué =

French footballer (born 1976)

Personal information
- Full name: Hervé Bacqué
- Date of birth: 13 July 1976 (age 50)
- Place of birth: Bordeaux, France
- Height: 1.80 m (5 ft 11 in)
- Position: Midfielder

Senior career*
Years	Team	Apps	(Gls)
1991–1994	Libourne		
1994–1995	Lorient		
1995–1996	Tarbes Pyrénées		
1996–1998	Monaco (B team)		
1998–1999	Luton Town	7	(0)
1999	Motherwell	1	(0)
1999	→ Lyn (loan)	1	(1)
1999–2000	Stade Bordelais		
2001	Coritiba		
2001–2002	Balma SC	5	(1)
2002–2004	Royan-Vaux		
2004–2007	FC Bassin d'Arcachon		
2007–	Biscarrosse		
- * Club domestic league appearances and goals

Hervé Bacqué (born 13 July 1976) is a French former professional football player.
