= Jamie McGowan (footballer, born 1970) =

English footballer

Personal information
- Date of birth: 5 December 1970 (age 55)
- Place of birth: Morecambe, England
- Height: 5 ft 11 in (1.80 m)
- Position: Defender

Youth career
- Morecambe

Senior career*
| Years | Team | Apps | (Gls) |
| 1992–1994 | Dundee | 35 | (1) |
| 1994–1998 | Falkirk | 131 | (8) |
| 1998–2000 | Motherwell | 45 | (1) |
| 2000–2003 | St Mirren | 61 | (1) |
| 2003–2004 | Alloa Athletic | 34 | (0) |
| 2004–2005 | Albion Rovers | 8 | (0) |
| 2007–2008 | East Fife | 2 | (1) |
- * Club domestic league appearances and goals

Jamie McGowan (born 5 December 1970 in Morecambe, Lancashire) is an English former professional footballer who played as a defender; he spent all of his professional career in the Scottish leagues, with clubs including Dundee, Falkirk, Motherwell and St Mirren.
