= Stevie Woods (football coach) =

Scottish football coach (born 1970)

Personal information
- Full name: Stephen Gerard Woods
- Date of birth: 23 February 1970 (age 56)
- Place of birth: Glasgow, Scotland
- Position: Goalkeeper

Team information
- Current team: Celtic (goalkeeping coach)

Youth career
- –1989: Kilpatrick Juveniles
- 1989–1992: Hibernian

Senior career*
| Years | Team | Apps | (Gls) |
| 1992–1993 | Clydebank | 57 | (0) |
| 1993–1994 | Preston North End | 20 | (0) |
| 1994–2003 | Motherwell | 143 | (0) |
| 2003–2005 | St Mirren | 9 | (0) |
| Total | | 229 | (0) |
- * Club domestic league appearances and goals

Stephen Gerard Woods (born 23 February 1970) is a Scottish football coach who works as a goalkeeping coach for Celtic.

Woods played as a goalkeeper for Hibernian, Clydebank, Preston North End, Motherwell and St Mirren.

After retiring as a player in 2005, Woods worked as the goalkeeping coach for Livingston and Dunfermline Athletic. He was appointed to a full-time coaching position with Celtic in 2007. Alex McLeish appointed Woods to an assistant coaching position with the Scotland national team in March 2018. He held this position until August 2021, when he was succeeded by Chris Woods.
