= Jan Michels =

Dutch former professional footballer (born 1970)

Personal information
- Date of birth: 8 September 1970 (age 56)
- Place of birth: Deventer, Netherlands
- Position: Midfielder

Senior career*
Years	Team	Apps	(Gls)
1990–1992	PEC Zwolle	34	(3)
1992–1998	Go Ahead Eagles	170	(20)
1998–1999	Motherwell	7	(0)
1999–2004	Den Bosch	157	(36)
2004–2006	Sparta Rotterdam	43	(1)
2006–2008	AGOVV	29	(0)
2008–2009	Excelsior '31		
- * Club domestic league appearances and goals

Jan Michels (born 8 September 1970) is a Dutch former professional footballer who played as a midfielder. His first professional club was PEC Zwolle in 1990. He later played with the Go Ahead Eagles, Motherwell in Scotland, Sparta Rotterdam, FC Den Bosch and AGOVV Apeldoorn.

== Career ==
He played five years for FC Den Bosch, winning promotion to the Eredivisie three times – in the 1998–99, 2000–01 and 2003–04 seasons. After playing two seasons with Excelsior '31, Michels announced his retirement from professional football in July 2010.

After his playing career, he started a construction company. Ahead of the 2020–21 season, he was appointed assistant coach of lower league club CSV Apeldoorn.

== Honours ==
Den Bosch

- Eerste Divisie: 1998–99, 2000–01, 2003–04
