= Steve McMillan (footballer) =

Scottish footballer

Stephen McMillan
Personal information
- Full name: Stephen Thomas McMillan
- Date of birth: 19 January 1976 (age 50)
- Place of birth: Edinburgh, Scotland
- Position: Defender

Senior career*
Years	Team	Apps	(Gls)
1992-1993	Troon		
1993–2001	Motherwell	153	(6)
2001–2007	Wigan Athletic	92	(0)
Total		245	(6)

International career
1997	Scotland U21	4	(0)
- * Club domestic league appearances and goals

Stephen Thomas McMillan (born 19 January 1976, in Edinburgh) is a Scottish former footballer, who retired from professional football in February 2007. He played for Troon, Motherwell and Wigan Athletic.

== Career ==
McMillan started his career at Scottish Junior side Troon before joining Motherwell in 1993. While at Motherwell, McMillan suffered a broken leg, which would lead to several injury problems in his later career. He bounced back from that unfortunate incident to develop into an all-around defender, able to move forward into attacking positions when needed.

McMillan was sold to Wigan Athletic in March 2001 for £550,000 on the same day as teammate Lee McCulloch. He was an instant hit at Wigan, but a series of injuries ruined his career. He suffered a knee injury setback in 2004, and was out of the game for almost a year, not making an appearance until late in the 2004–05 season. He was only able to make 5 appearances as Wigan were promoted, and he lost his place to the young Leighton Baines. McMillan only made two league appearances for Wigan in their debut Premiership season, against Charlton and Fulham. He picked up a bad knee injury in the League Cup semi-final against Arsenal, which ruled him out for the rest of the season. A year after the knee injury, McMillan announced his retirement on 27 February 2007.

== Honours ==
Wigan Athletic

- Football League Second Division: 2002–03
