= Stephen Halliday (footballer) =

English footballer

Personal information
- Full name: Stephen William Halliday
- Date of birth: 3 May 1976 (age 50)
- Place of birth: Sunderland, England
- Position: Striker

Senior career*
Years	Team	Apps	(Gls)
1994–1998	Hartlepool United	145	(26)
1998–2000	Motherwell	9	(0)
2000	→ Carlisle United (loan)	16	(7)
2000	Doncaster Rovers	11	(0)
2000–2002	Carlisle United	66	(8)
- Durham City
- Ryhope Forrester's
- * Club domestic league appearances and goals

Stephen William Halliday (born 3 May 1976) is an English retired professional footballer who played his entire career as a striker. His career included spells in England and Scotland.

Halliday started his career at Hartlepool United, making 167 appearances in total, scoring 27 goals. This resulted in a £50,000 move to Scottish Premier League club Motherwell in 1998. He did not hold down a regular first team place there and he eventually moved on loan to Carlisle United. He was released by Motherwell in 2000 and then joined Doncaster Rovers. After only three months in South Yorkshire, he left to re-join Cumbrian club Carlisle United for two years before moving to non-league side Durham City.
