= Lee McCulloch =

Scottish footballer (born 1978)

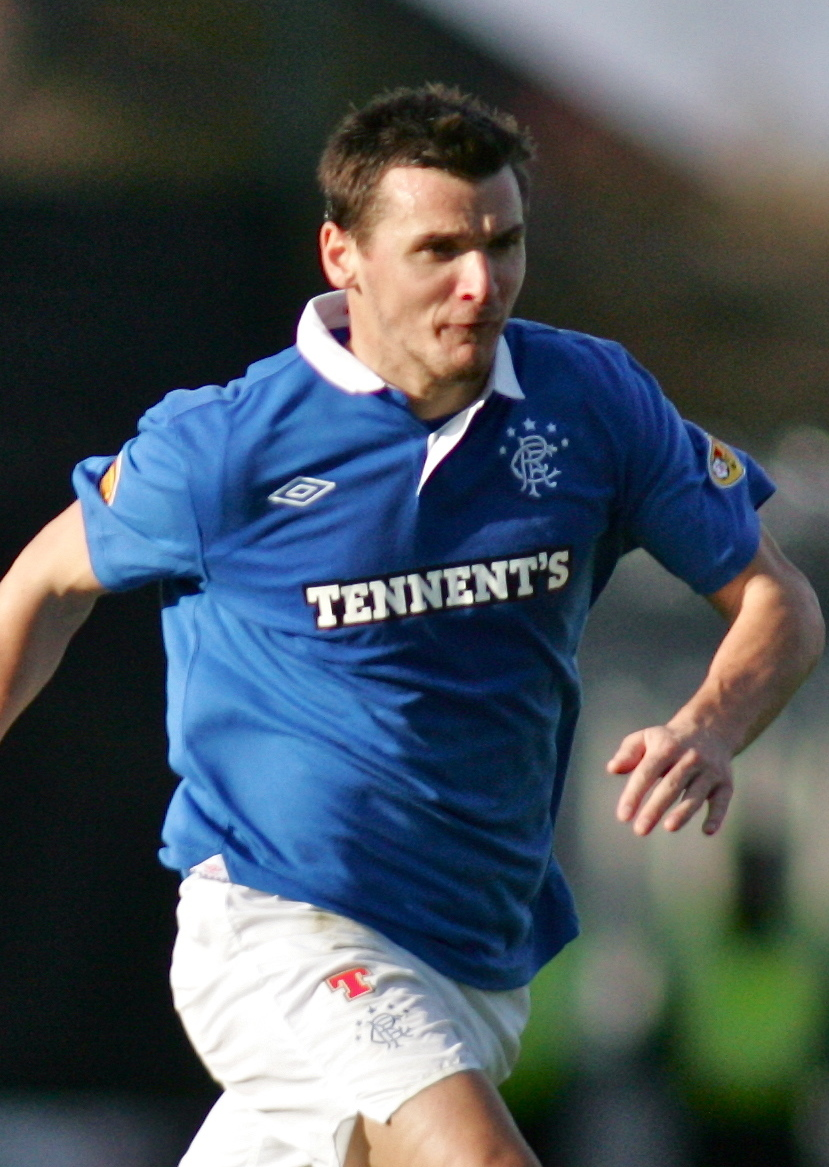
- McCulloch playing for Rangers in 2010

Personal information
- Full name: Lee Henry McCulloch
- Date of birth: 14 May 1978 (age 48)
- Place of birth: Bellshill, Scotland
- Height: 6 ft 1 in (1.85 m)
- Position: Utility player

Youth career
- Jerviston Boys Club
- 1991–1993: Rangers SABC
- 1993–1994: Motherwell

Senior career*
Years	Team	Apps	(Gls)
1994–2001	Motherwell	124	(21)
1994	→ Cumbernauld United (loan)		
1995	→ Carluke Rovers (loan)		
2001–2007	Wigan Athletic	224	(44)
2007–2015	Rangers	209	(52)
2015–2016	Kilmarnock	1	(0)
Total		558	(117)

International career
2003	Scotland B	1	(0)
2004–2010	Scotland	18	(1)

Managerial career
- 2016: Kilmarnock (caretaker)
- 2017: Kilmarnock
- * Club domestic league appearances and goals

Lee Henry McCulloch (born 14 May 1978) is a Scottish professional football coach and former player who currently serves as talent acquisition manager at English Premier League club Brighton & Hove Albion.

McCulloch was capped on eighteen occasions by the Scotland national football team. At club level, he played for Motherwell, Wigan Athletic, Rangers and Kilmarnock. Towards the end of his playing career, McCulloch was appointed a coach at Kilmarnock. He was appointed interim manager in January 2016 and February 2017. He was appointed manager on a permanent basis in June 2017, but left in September 2017.

He is a prime example of a utility player in football, having played in multiple outfield positions, from centre-back, defensive midfielder and striker at Rangers to attacking midfielder and winger at Wigan.

In January 2019, McCulloch joined Dundee United as strikers' coach, before being promoted to assistant coach in August 2019. In August 2020, he joined Heart of Midlothian as assistant manager, a position he held until April 2023.

== Club career ==
=== Motherwell ===
McCulloch started his career as a forward at hometown club Motherwell, graduating from their youth system having previously played at Rangers SABC (a boys' team affiliated to Rangers) alongside Barry Ferguson. Upon recovering from a broken ankle suffered during a loan spell with Carluke Rovers, McCulloch had an early experience of European football in the 1995–96 UEFA Cup under manager Alex McLeish, and went on to score 27 goals in 147 appearances for the Steelmen after making his debut against Raith Rovers on 24 August 1996. He scored his first and second goals in a league match against Hibernian on 31 January 1998.

After netting 12 and nine goals in consecutive seasons for Motherwell, along with some impressive performances, other clubs began to take notice of the young striker.

=== Wigan Athletic ===
McCulloch signed for Wigan Athletic in March 2001 for £700,000, (a then club signing record) on the same day as Motherwell teammate Steve McMillan. Wigan at this point were plying their trade in the third tier of English football, but were strongly ambitious, and saw the young Scotsmen as part of their long-term plans. McCulloch made his debut against Swindon Town on 3 March 2001 and scored his first goal for the club four weeks later, in a 2–1 win away to Wycombe Wanderers.

During his English league career, McCulloch found himself increasingly operating in a left midfield role, and this is the position he mainly played in during Wigan's first season in the Premier League in 2005–06. He weighed in with five league goals in thirty appearances, helping Wigan to a 10th-place finish, and appeared as a substitute in the 2006 League Cup final.

In January 2007, McCulloch was the subject of a £750,000 bid by Rangers. It was turned down by Wigan and labelled "derisory" by manager Paul Jewell. In May 2007, McCulloch told BBC Sport that he would relish the opportunity to play for Rangers, and the new manager at Wigan Athletic Chris Hutchings advised him that he may leave to move back to Scotland. On 23 June, Rangers had a bid of £1.5m rejected with Wigan said to want £2.5m for McCulloch, who had scored 46 goals in 241 matches for them.

=== Rangers ===
On 11 July 2007, Rangers signed McCulloch on a four-year deal with a transfer fee of £2.25m. McCulloch started his Rangers career with a goal on his debut in a 2–0 victory over FK Zeta on 31 July 2007. On 2 October 2007 in the 2007–08 UEFA Champions League, he scored the first goal, a header from a corner by DaMarcus Beasley in Rangers' 3–0 victory at the Stade de Gerland against Lyon.

On 23 December in a match with Aberdeen, McCulloch was sent off after 37 minutes after jumping at Aberdeen's Scott Severin as a mass brawl started, after Aberdeen's Chris Clark had scythed down Rangers defender Alan Hutton. McCulloch was the only player to be dismissed in the heated match. Later that season McCulloch played in the 2008 UEFA Cup Final, the 2008 Scottish League Cup Final and the 2008 Scottish Cup Final. Rangers lost the UEFA Cup Final but won a domestic cup double.

In his second season at Ibrox, McCulloch was again plagued with injuries. However, he did also manage to play for the club at central defence and as a defensive midfielder. In the first game of the 2009–10 season McCulloch scored a long range goal against Falkirk in a 4–1 win. The following match he scored his second goal of the season against Hearts: a header from a free kick that equalised for Rangers before Kris Boyd scored the winner in the 89th minute. On 3 January 2010 in the second Old Firm game of the season, McCulloch scored a header from a corner to tie the game 1–1. This was McCulloch's first ever Old Firm goal. McCulloch became a regular in central midfield as of 2009–10 season.

On 12 August 2010, Rangers announced that McCulloch had signed a two-year contract extension, keeping him at the club until 2013. His first game of the 2010–11 season came against St. Johnstone in which he set up the winner. McCulloch then went on to feature 27 times until it was revealed, after limping off against Hearts, he would require surgery to cure a cyst on his knee joint. McCulloch's versatility saw him play in attack, midfield and defence, and he hit a particularly good vein of form as a powerful striker as Rangers threadbare squad put together a decent run of results following the club's entry into administration. His commitment to the cause was never under question, and he made it clear from the outset that no matter what happened to the club, he would be staying at Ibrox. The business and assets of Rangers, including player registrations, were purchased by a brand new company led by Charles Green. While many players opted out of joining the new company, McCulloch was one of the few senior players who accepted the transfer. Rangers entered the Scottish Football League Third Division, the fourth tier of the Scottish football league system. He scored in extra time to give Rangers a 2–1 victory against Brechin City in the Scottish Challenge Cup on 29 July 2012. McCulloch was given the captaincy on 1 September 2012 after the departure of Carlos Bocanegra to Racing Santander on a season-long loan and on 31 October, he signed a contract extension with Rangers committing him until 2015.

On 12 March 2014, McCulloch scored a hat trick against Airdrieonians in a 3–0 win that clinched the League One championship. McCulloch was inducted into the Rangers Hall of Fame in March 2014, along with former Rangers players Nacho Novo and Fernando Ricksen. His first goal this season was in the Scottish Challenge Cup against Clyde that they won 8–1 and during this game he scored twice. His first league goal was in a 4–1 victory over Dumbarton, while first booking was in the Scottish Challenge Cup against Alloa Athletic. In December 2014, McCulloch was appointed player/coach for the Rangers first team after manager Ally McCoist was placed on gardening leave. In a 2–2 draw against Falkirk near the end of the season, McCulloch was jeered by some of the Rangers support after he had made an error leading to a goal for Falkirk. In July 2015, McCulloch left Rangers at the end of his contract. McCulloch said after leaving Rangers that the 2014–15 season had been his worst in football, with the team failing to gain promotion and off-field issues affecting performances. He also said that he had wanted to comment publicly on the club's problems, but was ordered not to by the club hierarchy.

=== Kilmarnock ===
McCulloch signed for Kilmarnock as a player/coach in July 2015. He said after joining Kilmarnock that although he had registered as a player, he did not expect to play many games for the club and that his main responsibility would be to develop younger players. He made one appearance in total that season, starting in a league match against Ross County, being replaced after forty-one minutes.

== International career ==
McCulloch earned his first international call-up to the Scotland national side in 2004, under the then manager Berti Vogts, and made his debut as a late substitute in a 1–1 draw with Moldova, a match which transpired to be Vogts' last match as manager. After the appointment of Walter Smith in 2004, he featured in the squad intermittently. He was involved in Smith's first three matches as manager against Italy, Moldova and Belarus and was included in the Kirin Cup matches against Bulgaria and Japan. He played in Scotland's famous 1–0 win over France in October 2006 and then in the equally famous reverse fixture, which Scotland also won 1–0.

He scored his first international goal in Scotland's Euro 2008 qualifying win over Ukraine. It was the second goal in a 3–1 victory at Hampden Park in October 2007. McCulloch retired from international football on 8 September 2008 as he wanted to concentrate on his club commitments. McCulloch was recalled to the national team following the appointment of Craig Levein and he made his first appearance since 2008 in a qualifier against Lithuania in September 2010.

== Coaching career ==
=== Kilmarnock ===
McCulloch was appointed Kilmarnock manager on an interim basis after Gary Locke resigned on 30 January 2016, managing two matches; a goalless draw with his former side Rangers in the Scottish Cup, and a 2–0 win over Motherwell in the league. He returned to his coaching duties after Lee Clark was appointed on a permanent basis in February 2016.

McCulloch and Peter Leven were put in temporary charge of the first team in February 2017, when Clark left Kilmarnock to manage Bury. He continued in interim charge until the end of the 2016–17 season, as Kilmarnock finished eighth in the Premiership. McCulloch was appointed Kilmarnock manager on a permanent basis on 5 June 2017. After the team failed to win any of their first eight league matches in 2017–18, McCulloch left Kilmarnock on 1 October 2017.

=== Post-Kilmarnock ===
McCulloch was appointed assistant manager of Polish club Lechia Gdańsk in January 2018. He became assistant to Adam Owen, who had been a fitness coach at Rangers while McCulloch played for them. He left his position with Lechia Gdańsk after the sacking of Owen seven weeks later.

In January 2019, he was appointed strikers' coach at Dundee United under the management of Robbie Neilson, before being promoted to joint assistant head coach alongside Gordon Forrest in June 2019. In August 2020, after Neilson's appointment as manager, he was appointed assistant manager at Heart of Midlothian. McCulloch left Hearts in April 2023, following the departure of Robbie Neilson.

As of 2025, he serves as the club's talent acquisition manager.

He is a graduate of Manchester Metropolitan University's Masters of Sport Directorship programme.

== Career statistics ==
=== Club ===
Appearances and goals by club, season and competition
Club	Season	League			National cup		League cup		Other (Note: Europe and Football League play-offs)		Total	
Club	Season	Division	Apps	Goals	Apps	Goals	Apps	Goals	Apps	Goals	Apps	Goals
Motherwell	1995–96	Scottish Premier Division	2	0	0	0	0	0	1	0	3	0
Motherwell	1996–97	Scottish Premier Division	15	0	3	0	0	0	0	0	18	0
Motherwell	1997–98	Scottish Premier Division	24	2	4	0	2	0	0	0	30	2
Motherwell	1998–99	Scottish Premier League	27	3	3	1	2	0	0	0	32	4
Motherwell	1999–2000	Scottish Premier League	30	9	4	2	1	1	0	0	35	12
Motherwell	2000–01	Scottish Premier League	26	7	1	1	2	1	0	0	29	9
Motherwell	Total		124	21	15	4	7	2	1	0	147	27
Wigan Athletic	2000–01	English Second Division	10	3	0	0	0	0	1	0	11	3
Wigan Athletic	2001–02	English Second Division	34	6	1	0	0	0	1	0	36	6
Wigan Athletic	2002–03	English Second Division	38	6	1	0	2	0	0	0	41	6
Wigan Athletic	2003–04	English First Division	41	6	1	0	3	1	0	0	45	7
Wigan Athletic	2004–05	English Championship	42	14	0	0	1	0	0	0	43	14
Wigan Athletic	2005–06	English Premier League	30	5	1	0	4	0	0	0	35	5
Wigan Athletic	2006–07	English Premier League	29	4	1	1	0	0	0	0	30	5
Wigan Athletic	Total		224	44	5	1	10	1	2	0	241	46
Rangers	2007–08	Scottish Premier League	22	3	6	2	3	0	15	2	46	7
Rangers	2008–09	Scottish Premier League	12	0	4	0	2	0	2	0	20	0
Rangers	2009–10	Scottish Premier League	34	5	4	0	3	1	6	1	47	7
Rangers	2010–11	Scottish Premier League	21	0	1	0	3	1	5	0	30	1
Rangers	2011–12	Scottish Premier League	26	5	0	0	1	0	3	0	30	5
Rangers	2012–13	Scottish Third Division	28	17	3	2	4	5	3	2	38	26
Rangers	2013–14	Scottish League One	34	17	6	0	1	0	5	1	46	18
Rangers	2014–15	Scottish Championship	32	4	3	0	5	0	6	2	46	6
Rangers	Total		209	52	27	4	22	7	45	8	303	70
Kilmarnock	2015–16	Scottish Premiership	1	0	0	0	0	0	0	0	1	0
Career total			558	114	47	9	39	10	48	6	692	143

=== International ===
Appearances and goals by national team and year
National team	Year	Apps	Goals
Scotland	2004	1	0
Scotland	2005	4	0
Scotland	2006	3	0
Scotland	2007	7	1
Scotland	2008	—	
Scotland	2009	—	
Scotland	2010	3	0
Total		18	1

Score and result list Scotland's goal tally first, score column indicates score after McCulloch goal.

International goal scored by Lee McCulloch
No.	Date	Venue	Opponent	Score	Result	Competition
1	13 October 2007	Hampden Park, Glasgow, Scotland	Ukraine	2–0	3–1	UEFA Euro 2008 qualifying

== Managerial statistics ==
As of match played 30 September 2017

Managerial record by team and tenure
Team	Nat	From	To	Record							
Team	Nat	From	To	G	W	D	L	GF	GA	GD	Win %
Kilmarnock (interim)	(Scotland)	31 January 2016	15 February 2016	3	1	1	1	3	2	+1	33.33
Kilmarnock	(Scotland)	15 February 2017	1 October 2017	27	7	7	13	29	38	−9	25.93
Total				30	8	8	14	32	40	−8	26.67

== Honours ==
Wigan Athletic

- Football League Second Division: 2002–03
- Football League Championship second-place promotion: 2004–05
- Football League Cup runner-up: 2005–06

Rangers

- Scottish Premier League: 2008–09, 2009–10, 2010–11
- Scottish League One: 2013–14
- Scottish Third Division: 2012–13
- Scottish Cup: 2007–08, 2008–09
- Scottish League Cup: 2007–08, 2009–10, 2010–11
- UEFA Cup runner-up: 2007–08

Scotland

- Kirin Cup: 2006

Individual

- Rangers Player of the Year: 2013
- PFA Scotland Third Division Team of the Year 2012–13
- PFA Scotland League One Team of the Year: 2013–14
- Rangers Hall of Fame Inductee: 2014
