= Rob Matthaei =

Dutch footballer (born 1966)

Personal information
- Date of birth: 20 September 1966 (age 60)
- Place of birth: Amsterdam, Netherlands
- Height: 1.70 m (5 ft 7 in)
- Position: Midfielder

Senior career*
Years	Team	Apps	(Gls)
1985–1990	HFC Haarlem	146	(11)
1990–1996	De Graafschap	154	(3)
1996–1998	FC Volendam	51	(0)
1998–2000	Motherwell	20	(0)
2000–2001	Dunfermline Athletic	17	(0)
2001–2002	Hollandia		
2003–2004	DWS		

Managerial career
- 2005–2008: Telstar (assistant)
- 2008–2010: HFC Haarlem (assistant)
- * Club domestic league appearances and goals

Rob Matthaei (born 20 September 1966 in Amsterdam) is a Dutch professional football coach and former player who played as a midfielder.

He is the uncle of Indonesia international Marc Klok.
