= Billy Davies =

Scottish footballer and manager

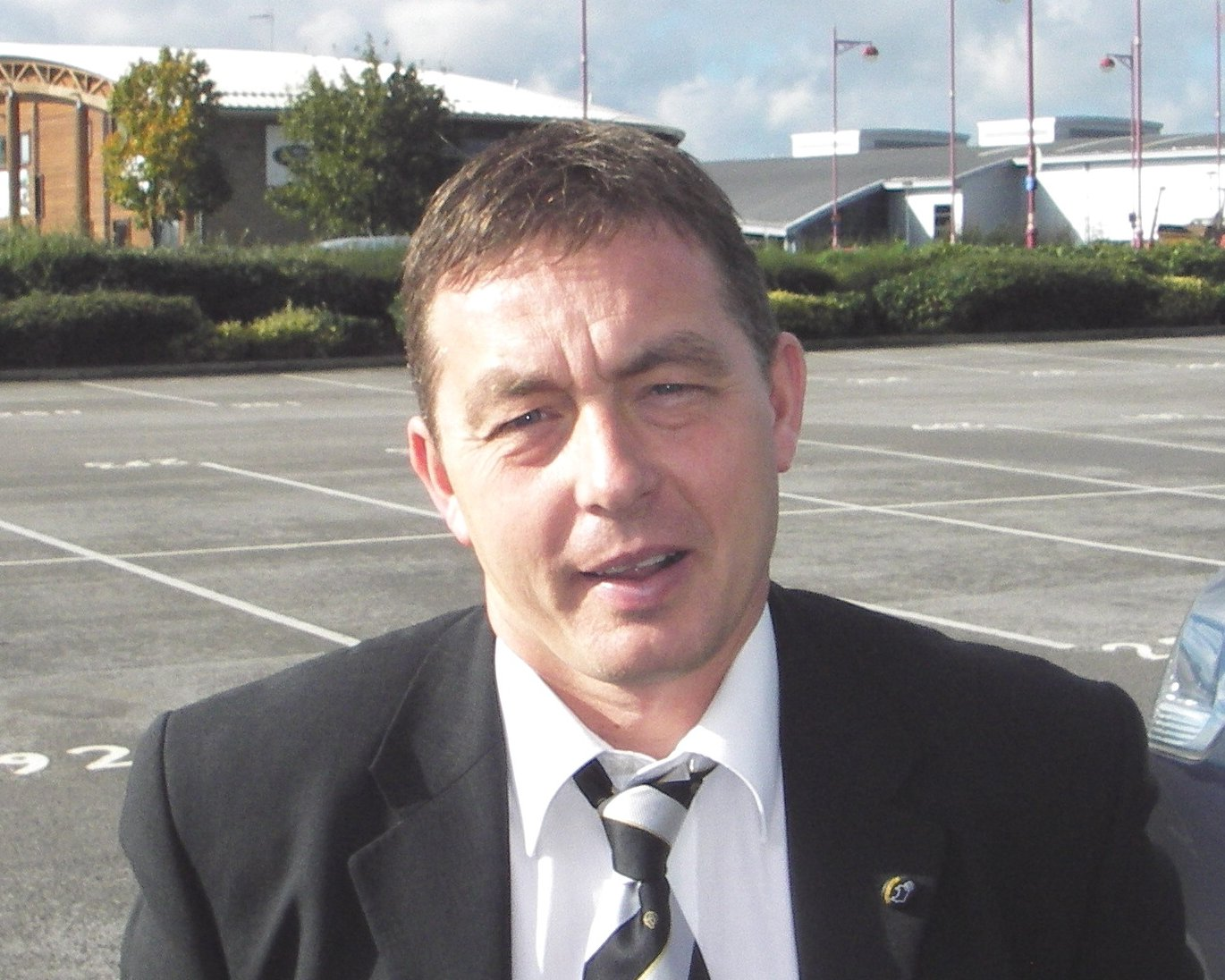
- Davies in 2006

Personal information
- Full name: William McIntosh Davies
- Date of birth: 31 May 1964 (age 62)
- Place of birth: Glasgow, Scotland
- Height: 5 ft 6 in (1.68 m)
- Position: Midfielder

Youth career
- Pollok United
- 1980–1981: Manchester United

Senior career*
Years	Team	Apps	(Gls)
1981–1986	Rangers	13	(1)
1986	Jönköping		
1987	Elfsborg	18	(1)
1987–1990	St Mirren	74	(5)
1990	Leicester City	6	(0)
1990–1993	Dunfermline Athletic	104	(10)
1993–1998	Motherwell	116	(9)
Total		331	(26)

Managerial career
- 1998–2001: Motherwell
- 2004–2006: Preston North End
- 2006–2007: Derby County
- 2009–2011: Nottingham Forest
- 2013–2014: Nottingham Forest
- 2025: Greenock Morton (interim)
- * Club domestic league appearances and goals

William McIntosh Davies (born 31 May 1964) is a Scottish football manager and former player. He most recently served as technical head coach of Scottish Championship club Greenock Morton.

As a manager he won the 2007 Championship play-offs with Derby County, finished as runners-up in the 2005 play-offs with Preston North End, and reached the semi-finals in 2006 (Preston), 2010 and 2011 (both with Nottingham Forest).

== Playing career ==
As a schoolboy, Davies was associated with Manchester United and he was offered a contract by then manager Dave Sexton.

Davies started his professional playing career at the Scottish club Rangers. He made his debut aged 17 years, 115 days against Brechin City on 23 September 1981, but rarely featured for the first team in his six years at Ibrox. He then had spells with Swedish teams Jönköping and Elfsborg. Davies went on to play for St Mirren, Leicester City and Dunfermline Athletic before he finished his playing career with Motherwell in his native Scotland.

== Managerial career ==
=== Motherwell ===
Davies went on to player-coach and then manage Motherwell, helping them first avoid relegation with few games remaining in his first season in charge. In the next season he took them to the brink of European football. The subsequent season was less successful, due mainly to the club's financial situation. The club sold nine first-team players in the off-season and Davies resigned on 18 September 2001 after poor form saw Motherwell gain just three points from seven matches at the start of the 2001–02 season.

=== Preston North End ===
Davies moved south to England and took on the role of assistant manager to former Scotland national coach Craig Brown at Preston North End. Following Brown's departure on 29 August 2004, Davies was installed as caretaker manager before being given the job permanently on 27 September.

Davies took Preston to the brink of the Premier League via the play-offs in May 2005 but lost in the final. Despite a difficult start to the 2005–06 season, a 25-game unbeaten run meant Preston went on to qualify for the play-offs for a second successive season although the side again failed to win promotion as they were knocked out by Leeds United after losing the semi-final second leg, after he famously left Elland Road following the first leg issuing the quote "Job done" to the media, only to lose at home and be knocked out.

Davies's success at Deepdale saw him linked with a number of other jobs. He was interviewed for the position at Charlton Athletic when it was announced that Alan Curbishley would be stepping down after 15 years as manager but Davies was unsuccessful and the job went to Iain Dowie instead. Davies then accepted an offer to manage Preston's Championship rivals Derby County on 2 June 2006.

=== Derby County ===
In Davies's first season as Derby manager he led them to third place in the league and won the play-offs after defeating Southampton in the semi-finals and then West Bromwich Albion at Wembley Stadium, ending Derby's five-year absence from the top flight – the scorer of the winning goal, Stephen Pearson, was a former youth player from Davies's time at Motherwell. Davies signed a one-year extension to his contract. Derby struggled in the Premier League, gaining only six points from 14 games. After criticising Derby's board for lack of investment, Davies left Pride Park by mutual consent on 26 November 2007 with the club bottom of the league. Some critics believed that Davies was a victim of his own success after overachieving in his first season at Pride Park, while others cited his apparent tactical inefficiencies at top flight level, poor big money signings (including £3m Claude Davis) and suggested Davies had engineered his own departure, in the form of an outspoken rant against the board so as to avoid having a relegation on his CV.

Davies was later linked with the managerial positions of the Scotland national team after Alex McLeish stepped down to take charge of Birmingham City (Davies would eventually decide against the post), Leicester City (after Gary Megson left to manage Bolton Wanderers), as well as Dundee and Hibernian. Davies was also considered a candidate to become assistant manager to Everton boss David Moyes, a role which came vacant when Alan Irvine left to take charge of Davies's old club Preston.

=== Nottingham Forest ===
On 31 December 2008, it was announced by Nottingham Forest that the club was in negotiations with Davies to succeed the recently dismissed Colin Calderwood. Davies was appointed as their manager on 1 January 2009, officially taking over on 5 January.

In the summer of 2009, Davies made several additions to his squad and spent around £4m. Forest embarked upon an 18-match unbeaten run starting at the end of September and including ten wins, five of which came successively, to climb the table rapidly into a play-off position at the end of November.

Davies was nominated for the manager of the month award for October after guiding Forest to three successive wins and a draw, but he missed out to Dave Jones of Cardiff City. Following failure in the play-offs for the second season running, on 12 June 2011 Davies was dismissed as manager of Nottingham Forest.

=== Return to Nottingham Forest ===
On 7 February 2013, Davies returned to Nottingham Forest as manager, signing a three-and-a-half-year deal, 20 months after being dismissed by the previous Forest board. Davies took charge of his first match since coming back on 16 February 2013, a 1–1 draw against Bolton Wanderers at the City Ground. The first victory of his second spell came three days later, a 6–1 win at home against Huddersfield Town. This was followed by his first away game at Charlton Athletic where Forest won 2–0. Under Davies they won six games in a row, including a 2–1 away win against second placed Hull City, placing them fifth in the Championship table and in a play-off position. Forest were unable to sustain their form and eventually finished eighth after losing 2–3 to Leicester City on 4 May 2013. On 18 October 2013, Davies signed a four-year contract extension at the City Ground. The chairman and club owner, Fawaz Al-Hasawi said "This is a fantastic day for Nottingham Forest. I look forward with great excitement to working alongside him for many years to come as we aim to bring success back to this magnificent club."

Davies's second spell proved to be a controversial and damaging one. He dismissed long-serving club staff without explanation, shouted at a photographer taking photos for the club's matchday programme after a game at Millwall, banned journalists as part of a "near media blackout" and employed his cousin, Jim Price, a suspended solicitor, as his closest adviser.

After an eight-game winless run left Nottingham Forest one place and two points outside of the play-off positions, and having seen his side lose 5–0 to local rivals Derby County two days earlier, Davies was dismissed on 24 March 2014. A statement on Forest's website read simply: "Nottingham Forest Football Club have confirmed the termination of manager Billy Davies' employment."

Louise Taylor of The Guardian pointed to Davies' "paranoia", "self-destructive insecurities" and "obsession with conspiracy theories and old grudges" as the reasons behind his downfall, suggesting that he had "shattered" his reputation. The Daily Telegraph's John Percy, who was one of a number of reporters who were "accused of being in league with his former employers" for questioning decisions Davies made, said that Davies was "destined for failure" because he was "obsessed" with conspiracies and hidden agendas. He pointed to the "huge funds" Davies was given to get Forest promoted and suggested that he "could have got away with" the "unsavoury" behaviour, had Forest been winning. John Payne of The Metro said that Davies owed the Forest fans an apology for his behaviour after failing to acknowledge them at the end of the defeat to Derby and "insulted fans' intelligence" by refusing to answer straight questions on the rare occasion he gave press interviews.

=== Technical head coach role at Greenock Morton ===
On 11 July 2025, Davies was appointed technical head coach at Greenock Morton. On 2 August 2025, Davies took interim charge of Morton for their opening-day Scottish Championship match against Dunfermline, following first-team manager Dougie Imrie's absence due to a private matter.. On 25 November 2025, Davies assumed interim charge of Morton following the departure of Imrie to Raith Rovers. On 18 December 2025, Morton announced that Davies would remain as technical head coach for the remainder of the season, with Gary Miller, the club's Head of Youth and Emerging Talent, temporarily fulfilled the position the club was recruiting for. On 16 January 2026, Davies departed by mutual agreement following the establishment of a new management structure.

== Personal life ==
Billy Davies is the elder brother of John Davies and the brother-in-law of John Spencer. Davies signed both his brother and Spencer when he was manager of Motherwell.

Davies frequently refers to himself in the third person during interviews as a running gag.

== Managerial statistics ==
As of match played 27 December 2025

Managerial record by team and tenure
Team	From	To	Record					Ref
Team	From	To	P	W	D	L	Win %	Ref
Motherwell	14 October 1998	18 September 2001	123	41	31	51	33.3	
Preston North End	29 August 2004	2 June 2006	101	45	35	21	44.6	
Derby County	2 June 2006	26 November 2007	69	31	14	24	44.9	
Nottingham Forest	5 January 2009	12 June 2011	126	53	36	37	42.1	
Nottingham Forest	7 February 2013	24 March 2014	60	25	21	14	41.7	
Greenock Morton (interim)	2 August 2025	2 August 2025	1	0	1	0	0.0	
Greenock Morton (interim)	25 November 2025	27 December 2025	5	1	2	2	20.0	
Total			485	196	140	149	40.4	—

== Honours ==
Derby County

- Football League Championship play-offs: 2007

Individual

- SPL Manager of the Month: November 2000
- Football League Championship Manager of the Month: January 2006, April 2006, November 2006, January 2007, December 2009, January 2011, March 2013
