= John Spencer (Scottish footballer) =

Scottish footballer and coach

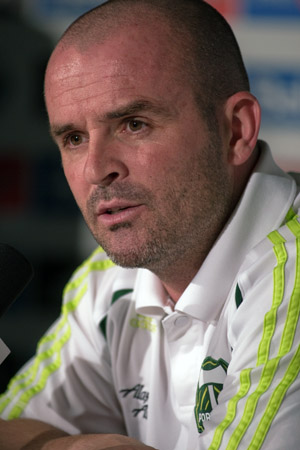

Personal information
- Full name: John Spencer
- Date of birth: 11 September 1970 (age 56)
- Place of birth: Glasgow, Scotland
- Height: 1.67 m (5 ft 6 in)
- Position: Forward

Youth career
- Rangers SABC
- 1982–1988: Rangers

Senior career*
Years	Team	Apps	(Gls)
1988–1992	Rangers	13	(2)
1988–1989	→ Greenock Morton (loan)	4	(1)
1989–1990	→ Lai Sun (loan)	24	(20)
1992–1997	Chelsea	103	(36)
1996–1997	→ Queens Park Rangers (loan)	25	(17)
1997–1998	Queens Park Rangers	23	(5)
1998–1999	→ Everton (loan)	6	(0)
1998–1999	Everton	3	(0)
1998–1999	→ Motherwell (loan)	21	(7)
1999–2000	Motherwell	33	(11)
2001–2004	Colorado Rapids	88	(37)
Total		343	(136)

International career
1990–1991	Scotland U21	3	(1)
1994–1997	Scotland	14	(0)

Managerial career
- 2011–2012: Portland Timbers
- * Club domestic league appearances and goals

John Spencer (born 11 September 1970) is a Scottish former professional football player and coach.

As a player, he was a forward from 1988 until 2004, notably in the English Premier League for Chelsea and Everton and the Scottish Premier League for Motherwell. He also played in his native country for Rangers and Morton, in Hong Kong for Lai Sun and in the English Football League with Queens Park Rangers. He finished his career in the United States with a three-year spell with the Colorado Rapids. He also earned 14 caps for Scotland.

Since retiring from playing in 2004, Spencer has remained in America, and was assistant coach of Houston Dynamo before becoming head coach of the Portland Timbers in 2011 until being relieved of his coaching position on 9 July 2012. He returned to the Colorado Rapids as an assistant coach in 2016, before joining the San Jose Earthquakes in a similar role for the 2017 season, until both he and head coach Dominic Kinnear were let go on 25 June 2017.

== Early life ==
Spencer was born in Glasgow and raised in the city's Gorbals district. He initially attended John Bosco Secondary School locally, and was in the same school year as fellow professional footballer Paddy Connolly. He then changed to St Ninian's High School in Giffnock.

== Club career ==
=== Rangers ===
Spencer started his career at Rangers, signing with the club as a schoolboy in 1982 and as a professional in 1985. Future Scotland colleague Eoin Jess was a teammate at youth level. His signing, even as a 12-year-old schoolboy who had yet to play a competitive senior match proved problematic; Spencer was Catholic and the club had a strong Protestant culture. His decision to sign for Rangers meant that he was regularly threatened and challenged to fights at the Catholic school he attended, while Celtic-supporting members of his family would walk by him in the street, and have never spoken to him since.

Spencer made his debut for Rangers in 1987, winning the minor Glasgow Cup in his first season. In 1988, he was loaned by then manager Graeme Souness to Morton, where he made four league appearances (scoring once) before returning to Ibrox. Spencer remained a fringe player at Rangers and after a further loan spell with Lai Sun of Hong Kong was sold in 1992 to Chelsea for a fee of £450,000, having made 20 appearances in all competitions over five years.

=== Chelsea ===
At Chelsea, Spencer enjoyed a consistent period of playing in his career. Between August 1992 and October 1996 he made 137 appearances and scored 43 goals in all competitions. He featured in the teams which lost 4–0 to Manchester United in the 1994 FA Cup Final and reached the semi-finals of the 1994–95 European Cup Winners' Cup and the 1995–96 FA Cup.

=== Queens Park Rangers ===
In November 1996, with Gianluca Vialli and Gianfranco Zola now on Chelsea's books, their manager Ruud Gullit sold Spencer for £2.5 million to another West London club, Queens Park Rangers, then in the second tier of English football, the First Division. Spencer appeared 56 times and scored 25 goals for QPR, but the team failed to gain promotion to the Premier League in Spencer's initial season, and flirted with relegation in his second.

=== Everton ===
In 1998, he moved to Everton, initially on loan, but subsequently for a fee of £1.5 million. Reunited with Walter Smith, his former manager at Rangers, Spencer's career at Everton quickly stalled, as he struggled to regain the performance levels required as a Premiership player. After only eight months and nine games he was loaned to Motherwell.

=== Motherwell ===
In 1999, Spencer's move to Motherwell was made permanent, for a club-record fee of £600,000. Spencer's signing was seen as evidence of a raised level ambition at Fir Park. Scoring 21 times in 81 appearances spread over three seasons, Spencer's time at Motherwell was tempered by a series of injuries. His final season, 2000–01, saw three goals. As Motherwell sought to cut costs, Spencer was sold to Colorado Rapids on 21 February 2001.

=== Colorado Rapids ===
Spencer made an impressive MLS debut with the Rapids. In his first year, he started 22 games, and finished the year with 14 goals and seven assists, and was subsequently named to the MLS Best XI. Spencer's second year was once more hampered by injuries, but he still finished with five goals and four assists in 13 games. He returned to form in 2003, leading the team in scoring again with 14 goals and five assists, winning a place in the MLS Best XI, as well as ranking as a finalist for the MLS MVP Award.

In 2004, as injuries kept him out of several games, he finished the season with four goals and one assist in 19 starts. He retired after the season. On 30 August 2009, Spencer was inducted into the Rapids Gallery of Honor at halftime of the Dynamo's 1–0 loss to the Rapids

== International career ==
Having played three matches for the under-21s while at Rangers, Spencer's prominence at Chelsea saw him gain the first of 14 caps for the Scotland national team in November 1994, appearing as a substitute in a 1–1 draw with Russia at Hampden Park in Scotland's successful campaign to qualify for the 1996 European Championship. He played in all three matches at the finals, starting in the defeat to England and coming off the bench in the draw against the Netherlands and the win over Switzerland. As his club career fluctuated he also featured less on the international scene, making one appearance at the outset of the 1998 FIFA World Cup qualification campaign, and claiming his last cap in a friendly against Wales in May 1997.

== Coaching career ==
=== Houston Dynamo ===
Upon retiring from his playing career, Spencer joined Houston Dynamo as an assistant coach on Dominic Kinnear's staff. With Spencer on staff, the Dynamo won back-to-back MLS Cup championships in 2006 and 2007. Spencer also served as the head coach for the Dynamo Reserves and led that squad to the 2008 MLS Reserve Division Championship.

=== Portland Timbers ===
Appointed the first head coach in the Timbers' MLS history on 10 August 2010, Spencer led the Timbers to a successful season in 2011, finishing on the brink of a coveted MLS Cup playoff berth in what was his first season as a head coach and the club's inaugural MLS season.

Under Spencer's guidance in 2011, the Timbers opened their MLS era with a historic start, winning their first five MLS matches on their home field at Jeld-Wen Field. Portland became the first MLS expansion side to win the first five home matches of its inaugural season. The Timbers' momentum at home continued throughout the season as the club finished among MLS leaders in goals scored at home (30) and home wins (9). The Timbers' success at home combined with energy of their passionate supporters group, the Timbers Army, gave Jeld-Wen Field the reputation of being one of the most intimidating venues for visiting teams in MLS. The club's 11 wins in 2011 ranks tied for fourth with the 2006 Houston Dynamo among wins for MLS "expansion" franchises (that Houston franchise being a relocated San Jose Earthquakes franchise).

Known as a "players coach", Spencer installed an attacking style of play and a blue-collar, hard-working mentality to the Timbers in his first season at the helm. Following a slow start for the Timbers in their second season, Spencer was relieved of his coaching duties for the Portland Timbers in July 2012.

== Personal life ==
Spencer is brother-in-law to football manager Billy Davies, who also played for Rangers and Motherwell and managed Preston North End, Derby County and Nottingham Forest. His other brother-in-law John Davies was also a footballer, with Billy Davies signing both Johns to play under him during his time as Motherwell boss.

His son, Brad Spencer, is a footballer.

== Managerial record ==
As of 21 May 2012

Team	From	To	Record^{1}				
Team	From	To	G	W	D	L	Win %
Portland Timbers	10 August 2010^{2}	9 July 2012	45	14	12	19	31.11
Total			45	14	12	19	31.11

- 1.Includes league, playoffs, cup and CONCACAF Champions League.
- 2.Spencer was hired as the first coach of the Major League Soccer franchise; not as the club's USSF Division 2 Professional League coach.

== Honours ==
Chelsea

- FA Cup runner-up: 1993–94

Individual

- MLS Best XI: 2001, 2003
