= 2003–04 Kilmarnock F.C. season =

Kilmarnock
2003–04 season
- Manager: Jim Jefferies
- Stadium: Rugby Park
- SPL: Tenth Place
- Scottish Cup: Fourth Round
- League Cup: Second Round
- Top goalscorer: League: Kris Boyd (15); All: Kris Boyd (15)
- Highest home attendance: 14,576 v Celtic, SPL, 18 April 2004
- Lowest home attendance: 4,886 v Hibernian, SPL, 24 April 2004
- Average home league attendance: 6,966
Home colours	Away colours

The 2003–04 season was Kilmarnock's fifth consecutive season in the Scottish Premier League, having competed in it since its inauguration in 1998–99. Kilmarnock also competed in the Scottish Cup and the League Cup.

== Summary ==
=== Season ===
Kilmarnock finished tenth in the Scottish Premier League with 42 points. They reached the second round of the League Cup, losing to Brechin City and the fourth round of the Scottish Cup, losing to Rangers.

The club would also make history with the Kilmarnock's academy squad winning the Scottish Youth Cup for the first time in their history, with a 1–0 win over Rangers at Rugby Park.

== Results and fixtures ==
Win Draw Loss Postponed

=== Scottish Premier League ===
Match	Date	Opponent	Venue	Result	Attendance	Scorers
1	9 August 2003	Rangers	A	0–4	49,108	
2	16 August 2003	Partick Thistle	H	2–1	6,778	Hardie 46’ Boyd 60’
3	23 August 2003	Motherwell	A	1–2	5,087	Dindeleux 76’
4	31 August 2003	Dundee	H	1–1	5,973	Boyd 79’
5	13 September 2003	Hearts	H	0–2	6,925	
6	20 September 2003	Livingston	H	2–1	6,150	Hessey 15’ Boyd 22’
7	27 September 2003	Dundee United	A	1–1	6,529	Boyd 72’
8	4 October 2003	Aberdeen	H	1–3	6,023	Nish 67’
9	18 October 2003	Dunfermline Athletic	A	3–2	4,495	McSwegan 24’, 84’ Shields 69’
10	25 October 2003	Hibernian	A	1–3	7,191	Nish 80’
11	1 November 2003	Celtic	H	0–5	12,460	
12	9 November 2003	Rangers	H	2–3	12,204	McDonald 39’ Canero 50’
13	22 November 2003	Partick Thistle	A	4–2	4,445	Nish 26’ McDonald 61’, 66’ Nish 90’
14	29 November 2003	Motherwell	H	2–0	6,320	Canero 13’ Boyd 60’
15	6 December 2003	Dundee	A	2–1	6,954	Nish 8’, Boyd 37’
16	13 December 2003	Heart of Midlothian	A	1–2	9,881	McSwegan 90’
17	20 December 2003	Livingston	H	0–3	5,035	
18	27 December 2003	Dundee United	H	0–2	6,062	
19	3 January 2004	Aberdeen	A	1–3	11,698	Nish 82’
20	17 January 2004	Dunfermline Athletic	H	1–1	5,715	McSwegan 29’ (Pen.)
21	24 January 2004	Hibernian	H	0–2	5,571	
22	31 January 2004	Celtic	A	1–5	59,138	Skora 84’
23	11 February 2004	Rangers	A	0–2	46,900	
24	14 February 2004	Partick Thistle	H	2–1	5,818	Lilley 55’, Boyd 58’
25	21 February 2004	Motherwell	H	0–1	5,163	
26	28 February 2004	Dundee	A	4–2	5,454	Skora 32’, Invincible 34’, 64’ Boyd 54’ (Pen.)
27	7 March 2004	Heart of Midlothian	H	1–1	5,297	Invincible 87’
28	20 March 2004	Dundee United	A	1–4	5,757	Invincible 61’
29	27 March 2004	Aberdeen	H	3–1	7,250	Dargo 1’ Boyd 28’, 76’
30	3 April 2004	Dunfermline Athletic	A	1–2	3,914	Invincible 9’
31	7 April 2004	Livingston	A	1–1	2,677	Dargo 85’
32	10 April 2004	Hibernian	H	0–3	7,326	
33	18 April 2004	Celtic	H	0–1	14,576	
34	24 April 2004	Hibernian	H	2–0	4,886	Boyd 28’, 76’
35	1 May 2004	Livingston	H	4–2	5,023	Nish 54’, 79’ Canning 74’ McSwegan 87’
36	8 May 2004	Dundee	A	0–2	4,942	
37	12 May 2004	Aberdeen	H	4–0	4,987	Skora 24’ Boyd 36’, 58’ Nish 61’
38	15 May 2004	Partick Thistle	A	2–2	4,124	Boyd 6’ Dargo 68’

=== Scottish League Cup ===
Match	Date	Opponent	Venue	Result	Attendance	Scorers
Second Round	23 September 2003	Brechin City	A	0–1	829	

=== Scottish Cup ===
Match	Date	Opponent	Venue	Result	Attendance	Scorers
Third Round	10 January 2004	Raith Rovers	A	3–1	3,610	McSwegan 28’ McDonald 32’ Nish 35’
Fourth Round	8 February 2004	Rangers	H	0–2	11,072	

== Player statistics ==
As of 15 May 2004 (UTC)

No.	Pos	Nat	Player	Total		Premier League		League Cup		Scottish Cup	
No.	Pos	Nat	Player	Apps	Goals	Apps	Goals	Apps	Goals	Apps	Goals
1	GK	(Scotland) SCO	Colin Meldrum	16	0	16+0	0	0+0	0	0+0	0
2	DF	(Scotland) SCO	Greg Shields	21	1	19+0	1	1+0	0	1+0	0
2	DF	(Scotland) SCO	David Lilley	14	1	14+0	1	0+0	0	0+0	0
3	DF	(Scotland) SCO	Barry McLaughlin	18	0	14+2	0	1+0	0	1+0	0
4	MF	(Scotland) SCO	Gary Locke	22	0	18+2	0	0+0	0	2+0	0
5	DF	(Scotland) SCO	Chris Innes	1	0	1+0	0	0+0	0	0+0	0
5	DF	(Scotland) SCO	Gordon Greer	27	0	23+2	0	0+0	0	2+0	0
6	DF	(France) FRA	Frédéric Dindeleux	35	1	33+0	1	1+0	0	1+0	0
7	MF	(Scotland) SCO	James Fowler	35	0	25+7	0	1+0	0	2+0	0
8	MF	(Scotland) SCO	Steve Fulton	23	0	21+0	0	1+0	0	1+0	0
9	FW	(Scotland) SCO	Gary McSwegan	34	6	13+18	5	0+1	0	2+0	1
10	FW	(Scotland) SCO	Craig Dargo	12	3	3+9	3	0+0	0	0+0	0
11	MF	(Scotland) SCO	Peter Canero	13	2	11+1	2	1+0	0	0+0	0
11	MF	(France) FRA	Eric Skora	18	3	16+1	3	0+0	0	1+0	0
12	FW	(Scotland) SCO	Kris Boyd	40	15	31+6	15	1+0	0	0+2	0
13	GK	(Scotland) SCO	Graeme Smith	3	0	2+1	0	0+0	0	0+0	0
14	MF	(Scotland) SCO	Alan Mahood	5	0	2+3	0	0+0	0	0+0	0
15	DF	(England) ENG	Sean Hessey	8	1	7+0	1	1+0	0	0+0	0
16	MF	(Scotland) SCO	Martin Hardie	18	1	8+8	1	1+0	0	1+0	0
17	DF	(Scotland) SCO	Shaun Dillon	2	0	2+0	0	0+0	0	0+0	0
18	MF	(Scotland) SCO	Gary McDonald	25	4	15+8	3	0+0	0	2+0	1
19	MF	(Scotland) SCO	Stevie Murray	31	0	22+7	0	0+1	0	0+1	0
20	FW	(Scotland) SCO	Paul Di Giacomo	8	0	4+3	0	0+1	0	0+0	0
21	FW	(Scotland) SCO	Colin Nish	32	10	15+15	9	1+0	0	1+0	1
23	MF	(Scotland) SCO	Mark Canning	5	1	4+1	1	0+0	0	0+0	0
24	DF	(Scotland) SCO	Garry Hay	32	0	30+0	0	0+0	0	2+0	0
26	GK	(Scotland) SCO	Craig Samson	1	0	1+0	0	0+0	0	0+0	0
27	FW	(Australia) AUS	Danny Invincible	24	5	19+3	5	0+0	0	1+1	0
28	GK	(France) FRA	François Dubourdeau	22	0	19+0	0	1+0	0	2+0	0
29	MF	(Scotland) SCO	Rhian Dodds	12	0	9+2	0	0+0	0	0+1	0
31	MF	(Scotland) SCO	Neil McGregor	0	0	0+0	0	0+0	0	0+0	0
42	FW	(Scotland) SCO	Steven Naismith	1	0	0+1	0	0+0	0	0+0	0

== Final league table ==
Pos	Team	Pld	W	D	L	GF	GA	GD	Pts	Qualification or relegation (Note: Teams played each other three times (33 matches), before the league split into two groups (the top six and the bottom six) for the last five matches.)
8	Hibernian	38	11	11	16	41	60	−19	44	Qualification for the UEFA Intertoto Cup second round (Note: Hibernian qualified for the 2004 UEFA Intertoto Cup as the highest placed team to apply to participate in the competition.)
9	Livingston	38	10	13	15	48	57	−9	43	
10	Kilmarnock	38	12	6	20	51	74	−23	42	
11	Aberdeen	38	9	7	22	39	63	−24	34	
12	Partick Thistle (R)	38	6	8	24	39	67	−28	26	Relegation to the Scottish First Division

Source: Scottish Professional Football League
Rules for classification: 1) Points; 2) Goal difference; 3) Goals scored
(R) Relegated

=== Division summary ===
Round	1	2	3	4	5	6	7	8	9	10	11	12	13	14	15	16	17	18	19	20	21	22	23	24	25	26	27	28	29	30	31	32	33	34	35	36	37	38
Ground	A	H	A	H	H	H	A	H	A	A	H	H	A	H	A	A	H	H	A	H	H	A	A	H	H	A	H	A	H	A	A	H	H	H	H	A	H	A
Result	L	W	L	D	L	W	D	L	W	L	L	L	W	W	W	L	L	L	L	D	L	L	L	W	L	W	D	L	W	L	D	L	L	W	W	L	W	D
Position	12	8	9	8	10	8	9	9	9	9	9	9	9	8	6	6	7	8	9	10	10	10	10	10	10	10	10	10	10	8	10	11	11	10	9	10	9	10

A = Away; H = Home; W = Win; D = Draw; L = Loss

== Transfers ==
=== Players in ===
Player	From	Fee
(Scotland) Martin Hardie	(Scotland) Partick Thistle	Free
(Scotland) Colin Nish	(Scotland) Dunfermline Athletic	Free
(Australia) Danny Invincible	(England) Swindon Town	Free
(France) François Dubourdeau	(Scotland) Motherwell	Free
(Scotland) Gordon Greer	(England) Blackburn Rovers	Free
(France) Éric Skora	(England) Preston North End	Loan
(Scotland) David Lilley	(Scotland) Partick Thistle	£30,000

=== Players out ===
Player	To	Fee
(Scotland) Gordon Marshall	(Scotland) Motherwell	Free
(Scotland) Colin Stewart	(Scotland) Ross County	Free
(Scotland) Chris Boyle	(Scotland) Dumbarton	Free
(Scotland) Emilio Jaconelli	(Scotland) Queen of the South	Free
(Scotland) Andy McLaren	(Scotland) Dundee United	Free
(Scotland) Chris Innes	(Scotland) Dundee United	£75,000
(Scotland) Peter Canero	(England) Leicester City	£250,000
(Scotland) Greg Shields	(Scotland) Dunfermline Athletic	Free
(England) Sean Hessey	(England) Blackpool	Free
(Scotland) Craig Samson	(Scotland) Queen of the South	Loan
