= 2004–05 Kilmarnock F.C. season =

Kilmarnock
2004–05 season
- Manager: Jim Jefferies
- Stadium: Rugby Park
- SPL: 7th
- Scottish Cup: Fourth Round
- League Cup: Third Round
- Top goalscorer: League: Kris Boyd (17); All: Kris Boyd (19)
- Highest home attendance: 11,156 v Rangers, SPL, 19 December 2004
- Lowest home attendance: 4,184 v Livingston, SPL, 14 May 2005
- Average home league attendance: 5,931
Home colours	Away colours

The 2004–05 season was Kilmarnock's sixth consecutive season in the Scottish Premier League, having competed in it since its inauguration in 1998–99. Kilmarnock also competed in the Scottish Cup and the League Cup.

== Summary ==
=== Season ===
Kilmarnock finished seventh in the Scottish Premier League with 49 points. They reached the third round of the League Cup, losing to Hearts and the fourth round of the Scottish Cup, also losing to Hearts.

== Results and fixtures ==
Win Draw Loss Postponed

=== Pre-season friendlies ===
Match	Date	Opponent	Venue	Result	Attendance	Scorers
West Sound Trophy	24 July 2004	Ayr United	A	2–2 (4–5 pen.)		Lilley, Dargo
	28 July 2004	Leicester City	H	2–3		Boyd, McDonald
	31 July 2004	Derby County	H	0–0		

=== Scottish Premier League ===
Match	Date	Opponent	Venue	Result	Attendance	Scorers
1	7 August 2004	Hibernian	A	1–0	10,933	Boyd 73’
2	14 August 2004	Celtic	H	2–4	10,500	McDonald 14’ Wales 28’
3	21 August 2004	Heart of Midlothian	A	0–3	11,403	
4	29 August 2004	Dunfermline Athletic	H	1–0	4,854	Invincible 11’
5	11 September 2004	Livingston	A	2–0	3,106	Lilley 60’ Invincible 72’
6	18 September 2004	Aberdeen	H	0–1	6,686	Fowler 54’ o.g.
7	25 September 2004	Dundee United	H	5–2	4,711	Boyd 7’, 16’, 33’, 37’ (Pen.), 84’
8	3 October 2004	Rangers	A	0–2	46,278	
9	16 October 2004	Dundee	A	1–3	4,637	Boyd 5’
10	23 October 2004	Inverness CT	H	2–2	4,721	Murray 5’ Greer 27’
11	27 October 2004	Motherwell	A	0–1	4,521	Nish 57’
12	30 October 2004	Hibernian	H	3–1	5,959	Nish 20’, 42’ Dargo 40’
13	6 November 2004	Celtic	A	1–2	57,348	Nish 89’
14	13 November 2004	Heart of Midlothian	H	1–1	6,129	Leven 31’
15	20 November 2004	Dunfermline Athletic	A	1–4	4,344	Wales 80’
16	27 November 2004	Heart of Midlothian	H	1–3	5,389	Johnston 25’
17	4 December 2004	Aberdeen	A	2–3	11,139	Invincible 7’ Leven 18’
18	11 December 2004	Dundee United	A	0–3	5,097	
19	19 December 2004	Rangers	H	0–1	11,156	
20	27 December 2004	Dundee	H	3–1	5,468	Invincible 18’ Ford 38’ Boyd 82’
21	3 January 2005	Inverness CT	A	2–0	1,346	Invincible 79’, 90
22	15 January 2005	Motherwell	H	2–0	5,225	Boyd 1’, 44’
23	22 January 2005	Hibernian	A	0–3	12,660	
24	30 January 2005	Celtic	H	0–1	9,723	
25	12 February 2005	Heart of Midlothian	A	0–3	9,220	
26	19 February 2005	Dunfermline Athletic	H	2–1	4,701	Naismith 12’ Boyd 43’
27	26 February 2005	Rangers	A	1–2	48,578	Boyd 76’
28	2 March 2005	Livingston	A	1–3	5,757	Johnston 13’
29	5 March 2005	Aberdeen	H	0–1	5,181	
30	12 March 2005	Dundee United	H	3–0	4,353	Boyd 27’, 78’ (Pen.) Invincible 88’
31	2 April 2005	Dundee	A	0–1	5,494	
32	9 April 2005	Inverness CT	H	0–1	4,862	
33	16 April 2005	Motherwell	A	1–1	4,999	Leven 33’
34	23 April 2005	Dundee	H	1–0	3,770	Dargo 84’
35	30 April 2005	Inverness CT	A	1–2	3,108	McDonald 21’ Leven 72’ (Pen.)
36	7 May 2005	Dundee United	A	1–1	4,942	Boyd 53’
37	14 May 2005	Livingston	H	2–0	4,184	Boyd 75’, Johnston 85’
38	21 May 2005	Dunfermline Athletic	H	4–0	5,100	Locke 26’ Dodds 46’ Boyd 54’ McDonald 64’

=== Scottish League Cup ===
Match	Date	Opponent	Venue	Result	Attendance	Scorers
Second Round	24 August 2004	Hamilton Academical	A	3–0	3,375	Invincible 63’, 86 McDonald 70’
Third Round	22 September 2004	Heart of Midlothian	A	1–2	5,924	Leven 56’

=== Scottish Cup ===
Match	Date	Opponent	Venue	Result	Attendance	Scorers
Third round	8 January 2005	Motherwell	H	2–0	6,093	McDonald 42’ Boyd 45’
Fourth round	5 February 2005	Heart of Midlothian	A	2–2	10,308	Nish 25’ Naismith 89’
Fourth round replay	16 February 2005	Heart of Midlothian	H	1–3	6,366	Boyd 90’

== Player statistics ==
As of 21 May 2005 (UTC)

No.	Pos	Nat	Player	Total		Premier League		League Cup		Scottish Cup	
No.	Pos	Nat	Player	Apps	Goals	Apps	Goals	Apps	Goals	Apps	Goals
1	GK	(Scotland) SCO	Alan Combe	37	0	32+0	0	2+0	0	3+0	0
2	MF	(Scotland) SCO	James Fowler	31	0	24+5	0	2+0	0	0+0	0
3	DF	(Scotland) SCO	Garry Hay	29	0	22+3	0	1+0	0	3+0	0
4	DF	(Scotland) SCO	David Lilley	38	1	33+0	1	2+0	0	3+0	0
5	DF	(Scotland) SCO	Gordon Greer	24	1	19+3	1	1+0	0	1+0	0
6	DF	(France) FRA	Frédéric Dindeleux	32	1	27+2	1	2+0	0	1+0	0
7	MF	(Scotland) SCO	Gary McDonald	43	5	38+0	3	2+0	1	3+0	1
8	MF	(Scotland) SCO	Gary Locke	28	1	22+3	1	1+1	0	0+1	0
9	FW	(Scotland) SCO	Kris Boyd	35	19	29+1	17	2+0	0	2+1	2
10	FW	(Scotland) SCO	Craig Dargo	20	2	10+10	2	0+0	0	0+0	0
11	FW	(Australia) AUS	Danny Invincible	36	9	28+3	7	2+0	2	3+0	0
12	MF	(Scotland) SCO	Allan Johnston	33	3	19+9	3	2+0	0	2+1	0
13	GK	(Scotland) SCO	Graeme Smith	6	0	6+0	0	0+0	0	0+0	0
14	FW	(Scotland) SCO	Gary Wales	26	2	12+12	2	0+1	0	0+1	0
15	FW	(Scotland) SCO	Colin Nish	28	5	16+10	4	0+0	0	2+0	1
16	MF	(France) FRA	Eric Joly	8	0	0+6	0	1+1	0	0+0	0
16	MF	(England) ENG	Liam Fontaine	5	0	3+0	0	0+0	0	2+0	0
17	DF	(Scotland) SCO	Shaun Dillon	6	0	4+2	0	0+0	0	0+0	0
18	DF	(Jamaica) JAM	Simon Ford	20	1	17+1	1	0+0	0	2+0	0
19	MF	(Scotland) SCO	Stevie Murray	24	1	8+13	1	0+1	0	0+2	0
20	FW	(Scotland) SCO	Paul Di Giacomo	8	0	4+3	0	0+1	0	0+0	0
21	MF	(Scotland) SCO	Rhian Dodds	9	1	4+4	1	0+1	0	0+0	0
22	MF	(Scotland) SCO	Peter Leven	36	4	29+3	4	1+0	0	3+0	0
23	MF	(Scotland) SCO	Mark Canning	0	0	0+0	0	0+0	0	0+0	0
25	MF	(France) FRA	Mickaël Wolski	0	0	0+0	0	0+0	0	0+0	0
26	GK	(Scotland) SCO	Craig Samson	0	0	0+0	0	0+0	0	0+0	0
27	DF	(Scotland) SCO	Neil McGregor	0	0	0+0	0	0+0	0	0+0	0
29	FW	(Scotland) SCO	Scott Johnstone	0	0	0+0	0	0+0	0	0+0	0
31	MF	(Scotland) SCO	Jamie Hamill	0	0	0+0	0	0+0	0	0+0	0
32	GK	(Scotland) SCO	Cameron Bell	0	0	0+0	0	0+0	0	0+0	0
33	FW	(Scotland) SCO	Steven Naismith	27	2	16+8	1	0+0	0	2+1	1
34	FW	(Scotland) SCO	Robert Campbell	0	0	0+0	0	0+0	0	0+0	0
39	FW	(Scotland) SCO	Rory Loy	0	0	0+0	0	0+0	0	0+0	0
42	DF	(Scotland) SCO	Gary Wild	0	0	0+0	0	0+0	0	0+0	0

== Final league table ==
Pos	Team	Pld	W	D	L	GF	GA	GD	Pts	Qualification or relegation (Note: Teams played each other three times (33 matches), before the league split into two groups (the top six and the bottom six) for the last five matches.)
5	Heart of Midlothian	38	13	11	14	43	41	+2	50	
6	Motherwell	38	13	9	16	46	49	−3	48	
7	Kilmarnock	38	15	4	19	49	55	−6	49	
8	Inverness Caledonian Thistle	38	11	11	16	41	47	−6	44	
9	Dundee United	38	8	12	18	41	59	−18	36	Qualification for the UEFA Cup second qualifying round (Note: As Celtic, the 2004–05 Scottish Cup winners, qualified for the UEFA Champions League via their league position, the place in the UEFA Cup was passed onto Dundee United, the cup runners-up.)

Source: Scottish Professional Football League
Rules for classification: 1) Points; 2) Goal difference; 3) Goals scored

=== Division summary ===
Round	1	2	3	4	5	6	7	8	9	10	11	12	13	14	15	16	17	18	19	20	21	22	23	24	25	26	27	28	29	30	31	32	33	34	35	36	37	38
Ground	A	H	A	H	A	H	H	A	A	H	A	H	A	H	A	H	A	A	H	H	A	H	A	H	A	H	A	A	H	H	A	H	A	H	A	A	H	H
Result	W	L	L	W	W	L	W	L	L	D	W	W	L	D	L	L	L	L	L	W	W	W	L	L	L	W	L	L	L	W	L	L	D	W	W	D	W	W
Position	4	6	10	6	3	5	5	7	7	7	6	5	6	6	7	7	7	7	7	7	7	7	7	7	7	7	7	7	7	8	8	8	8	8	8	8	7	7

A = Away; H = Home; W = Win; D = Draw; L = Loss

== Transfers ==
=== Players in ===
Player	From	Fee
(Scotland) Alan Combe	(England) Bradford City	Free
(Scotland) Peter Leven	(Scotland) Rangers	Free
(Scotland) Gary Wales	(England) Gillingham	Free
(Scotland) Allan Johnston	(England) Middlesbrough	Free
(France) Eric Joly	(Belgium) Mons	Free
(Jamaica) Simon Ford	(England) Redbridge	Free
(England) Liam Fontaine	(England) Fulham	Loan

=== Players out ===
Player	To	Fee
(France) David Merdy	(France) Rodez AF	Free
(Scotland) Gary McSwegan	(Scotland) Ross County	Free
(Scotland) Craig Samson	(Scotland) Queen of the South	Loan
(Scotland) Colin Meldrum	(Scotland) Livingston	Free
(Scotland) Steve Fulton	(Scotland) Partick Thistle	Free
(Scotland) Barry McLaughlin	(Scotland) Ayr United	Free
(Scotland) Martin Hardie	(Scotland) Airdrie United	Free
(Scotland) Alan Mahood	(Scotland) Ross County	Free
(Scotland) Craig Samson	(Scotland) St Johnstone	Loan
(Scotland) Shaun Dillon	(Scotland) Greenock Morton	Loan
(France) Eric Joly	(Belgium) K.V. Oostende	Free
(Scotland) Mark Canning	(Scotland) Stirling Albion	Free
(France) François Dubourdeau	(Scotland) Dundee	Free
