= 2002–03 Kilmarnock F.C. season =

Kilmarnock
2002–03 season
- Manager: Jim Jefferies
- Stadium: Rugby Park
- SPL: Fourth Place
- Scottish Cup: Third Round
- League Cup: Second Round
- Top goalscorer: League: Kris Boyd (12); All: Kris Boyd (12)
- Highest home attendance: 16,722 v Celtic, SPL, 25 May 2003
- Lowest home attendance: 4,021 v Dunfermline, SPL, 16 March 2003
- Average home league attendance: 7,408
Home colours	Away colours

The 2002–03 season was Kilmarnock's fourth consecutive season in the Scottish Premier League, having competed in it since its inauguration in 1998–99. Kilmarnock also competed in the Scottish Cup and the League Cup.

== Summary ==
=== Season ===
In their first full season under Jim Jefferies, Kilmarnock finished fourth in the Scottish Premier League with 57 points. They reached the second round of the League Cup, losing to Airdrie United, and the third round of the Scottish Cup, losing to Motherwell.

== Results and fixtures ==
Kilmarnock's score comes first

Win Draw Loss Postponed

=== Scottish Premier League ===
Match	Date	Opponent	Venue	Result	Attendance	Scorers
1	3 August 2002	Rangers	H	1–1	13,972	McLaren 80’
2	10 August 2002	Dundee United	A	2–1	6,366	Dargo 78’ Boyd 82’
3	17 August 2002	Motherwell	H	0–3	6,164	
4	18 August 2001	Livingston	A	1–0	6,480	Boyd 42'
5	31 August 2002	Hearts	A	1–1	11,912	Boyd 45’
6	11 September 2001	Partick Thistle	H	1–0	6,848	Canero 42’
7	14 September 2002	Aberdeen	H	2–2	6,538	Mahood 56’ McLaughlin 90’
8	21 September 2002	Hibernian	A	0–2	8,680	
9	28 September 2002	Celtic	A	0–5	57,469	
10	5 October 2002	Dundee	A	1–2	5,567	Boutal 66'
11	19 October 2002	Dunfermline	H	2–2	5,515	Shields 43’ Boyd 76’
12	27 October 2002	Rangers	A	1–6	48,368	Fulton 44’
13	2 November 2002	Dundee United	H	1–2	5,417	Fulton 24’
14	9 November 2002	Motherwell	A	1–0	4,439	Boyd 90’
15	16 November 2002	Livingston	H	2–0	5,270	Di Giacomo 64’, McSwegan 90’
16	23 November 2002	Hearts	H	0–1	6,511	
17	30 November 2002	Partick Thistle	A	0–3	5,055	
18	3 December 2002	Aberdeen	A	1–0	8,861	McSwegan 66’,
19	7 December 2002	Dundee	H	2–0	4,810	Fulton 57’ Boyd 90’
20	15 December 2002	Celtic	H	1–1	9,225	Andy McLaren 19’
21	21 December 2002	Hibernian	H	2–1	5,814	McSwegan 63’, Fulton 88’
22	26 December 2002	Dunfermline	A	2–0	5,847	McSwegan 70’ Boyd 88’
23	29 December 2002	Rangers	H	0–1	13,396	
24	2 January 2003	Dundee United	A	2–2	7,183	Canero 21’, McLaren 67’
25	29 January 2003	Motherwell	H	1–0	4,457	Boyd 81’ (Pen.)
26	1 February 2003	Livingston	A	4–0	4,144	McLaren 21’, Canero 34’ Boyd 49’ McLaren 70’
27	8 February 2003	Hearts	A	0–3	10,426	
28	23 February 2003	Partick Thistle	H	1–0	5,651	Canero 45’
29	1 March 2003	Aberdeen	H	2–0	5,769	McSwegan 58’ Canero 63’
30	8 March 2003	Dundee	A	2–2	6,531	Canero 51’ McSwegan 85’
31	16 March 2003	Dunfermline Athletic	H	1–1	4,021	Boyd 81’
32	5 April 2003	Hibernian	H	6–2	5,558	McDonald 11’ McSwegan 24’, 42’, 47’, 62’, Boyd 90’ (Pen.)
33	13 April 2003	Celtic	A	0–2	56,966	
34	27 April 2003	Dundee	A	1–0	5,964	Chris Innes 76’
35	13 April 2002	Hearts	H	1–0	9,091	McSwegan 29’
36	11 May 2003	Rangers	A	0–4	49,036	
37	17 May 2003	Dunfermline	A	2–2	6,896	McDonald 21’ Boyd 90’
38	25 May 2003	Celtic	H	0–4	16,722	

=== Scottish League Cup ===
Match	Date	Opponent	Venue	Result	Attendance	Scorers
Second Round	24 September 2002	Airdrie United	H	0–0 (3–4 pens)	4,150	

=== Scottish Cup ===
Match	Date	Opponent	Venue	Result	Attendance	Scorers
Third Round	25 January 2003	Motherwell	H	0–1	6,882	

== Player statistics ==
As of 25 May 2003 (UTC)

No.	Pos	Nat	Player	Total		Premier League		League Cup		Scottish Cup	
No.	Pos	Nat	Player	Apps	Goals	Apps	Goals	Apps	Goals	Apps	Goals
1	GK	(Scotland) SCO	Gordon Marshall	32	0	30+0	0	1+0	0	1+0	0
2	DF	(Scotland) SCO	Greg Shields	35	1	34+0	1	0+0	0	1+0	0
3	DF	(England) ENG	Sean Hessey	5	0	5+0	0	0+0	0	0+0	0
4	DF	(Scotland) SCO	Barry McLaughlin	22	1	17+3	1	1+0	0	0+1	0
5	MF	(Scotland) SCO	Gary Locke	22	0	15+7	0	0+0	0	0+0	0
6	DF	(France) FRA	Frédéric Dindeleux	27	0	27+0	0	0+0	0	0+0	0
7	FW	(Scotland) SCO	Andy McLaren	26	5	23+2	5	0+0	0	1+0	0
8	MF	(Scotland) SCO	Steve Fulton	38	4	36+0	4	1+0	0	1+0	0
10	FW	(Scotland) SCO	Craig Dargo	16	1	10+5	1	0+0	0	1+0	0
11	MF	(Scotland) SCO	Ally Mitchell	11	0	4+6	0	1+0	0	0+0	0
13	GK	(Scotland) SCO	Colin Meldrum	7	0	7+0	0	0+0	0	0+0	0
14	MF	(Scotland) SCO	Alan Mahood	37	1	35+0	1	0+1	0	1+0	0
15	DF	(Scotland) SCO	Peter Canero	33	6	31+2	6	0+0	0	0+0	0
16	DF	(Scotland) SCO	Garry Hay	22	0	12+9	0	1+0	0	0+0	0
17	DF	(Scotland) SCO	James Fowler	34	0	25+7	0	1+0	0	1+0	0
18	MF	(Spain) ESP	Jesús Sanjuán	9	0	5+3	0	1+0	0	0+0	0
19	MF	(Scotland) SCO	Stevie Murray	11	0	4+5	0	0+1	0	0+1	0
20	FW	(Scotland) SCO	Paul Di Giacomo	22	1	6+14	1	1+0	0	1+0	0
21	DF	(Scotland) SCO	Chris Innes	22	1	19+1	1	1+0	0	1+0	0
22	FW	(Scotland) SCO	Kris Boyd	40	12	17+21	12	1+0	0	1+0	0
23	MF	(Scotland) SCO	Mark Canning	1	0	0+1	0	0+0	0	0+0	0
24	MF	(Scotland) SCO	Gary McDonald	7	0	1+5	0	0+0	0	0+1	0
25	FW	(Scotland) SCO	Gary McSwegan	33	11	25+7	11	0+0	0	0+1	0
26	GK	(Scotland) SCO	Colin Stewart	1	0	1+0	0	0+0	0	0+0	0
29	FW	(Angola) ANG	José Quitongo	9	0	4+4	0	0+0	0	1+0	0
32	FW	(Scotland) SCO	Emilio Jaconelli	0	0	0+0	0	0+0	0	0+0	0
33	FW	(France) FRA	Samuel Boutal	3	1	3+0	1	0+0	0	0+0	0
34	DF	(Scotland) SCO	Shaun Dillon	15	0	13+1	0	0+0	0	1+0	0
35	MF	(Scotland) SCO	Stevie Murray	21	2	16+3	2	0+0	0	2+0	0
37	GK	(Scotland) SCO	Craig Samson	0	0	0+0	0	0+0	0	0+0	0

== Final league table ==
Pos	Team	Pld	W	D	L	GF	GA	GD	Pts	Qualification or relegation (Note: Teams played each other three times (33 matches), before the league split into two groups (the top six and the bottom six) for the last five matches.)
2	Celtic	38	31	4	3	98	26	+72	97	Qualification for the Champions League second qualifying round
3	Heart of Midlothian	38	18	9	11	57	51	+6	63	Qualification for the UEFA Cup first round
4	Kilmarnock	38	16	9	13	47	56	−9	57	
5	Dunfermline Athletic	38	13	7	18	54	71	−17	46	
6	Dundee	38	10	14	14	50	60	−10	44	Qualification for the UEFA Cup first round (Note: As Rangers, the 2002–03 Scottish Cup winners, qualified for the UEFA Champions League via their league position, the place in the UEFA Cup was passed onto Dundee, the cup runners-up)

Source: Scottish Professional Football League
Rules for classification: 1) Points; 2) Goal difference; 3) Goals scored

=== Division summary ===
Round	1	2	3	4	5	6	7	8	9	10	11	12	13	14	15	16	17	18	19	20	21	22	23	24	25	26	27	28	29	30	31	32	33	34	35	36	37	38
Ground	H	A	H	A	A	H	H	A	A	A	H	A	H	A	H	H	A	A	H	H	H	A	H	A	H	A	A	H	H	A	H	H	A	A	H	A	A	H
Result	D	W	L	W	D	W	D	L	L	L	D	L	L	W	W	L	L	W	W	D	W	W	L	D	W	W	L	W	W	D	D	W	L	W	W	L	D	L
Position	6	4	7	4	4	3	4	5	5	8	8	8	8	8	6	7	7	7	6	6	6	5	6	6	5	4	4	4	4	4	4	4	4	4	4	4	4	4

A = Away; H = Home; W = Win; D = Draw; L = Loss

== Transfers ==
=== Players in ===
Player	From	Fee
(Scotland) Greg Shields	(England) Charlton Athletic	Free
(Scotland) Barry McLaughlin	(Scotland) St Mirren	Undisclosed
(Scotland) Gary McSwegan	(Scotland) Heart of Midlothian	Free
(Scotland) Steve Fulton	(Scotland) Heart of Midlothian	Free
(Angola) José Quitongo	(Scotland) St Mirren	Free
(Scotland) Gary Locke	(England) Bradford City	Free
(France) Samuel Boutal	(France) Troyes	Free

=== Players out ===
Player	To	Fee
(Scotland) Ian Durrant	Retired	
(Democratic Republic of the Congo) Michel Ngonge	Retired	
(Spain) Antonio Calderón	(Scotland) Raith Rovers	Free
(France) Christophe Cocard	(China) Chongqing Lifan	Free
(Scotland) Martin Baker	(Scotland) St Mirren	Free
(France) David Merdy	(France) SO Romorantin	Loan
(Scotland) Kevin McGowne	(Scotland) Dundee United	Free
(England) Tommy Johnson	(England) Gillingham	Free
(Scotland) Colin Stewart	(Scotland) Queen's Park	Loan
(Scotland) Gary McCutcheon	(Scotland) Dumbarton	Free
(Scotland) Robbie Henderson	(Scotland) Greenock Morton	Free
(Scotland) Ally Mitchell	(Scotland) St Mirren	Free
(Spain) Jesús García Sanjuán	Released	Free
(France) Samuel Boutal	(China) Shanghai Cosco	Free
(Angola) José Quitongo	(United Arab Emirates) Dibba Al-Hisn	Free
