= 2001–02 Kilmarnock F.C. season =

Kilmarnock
2001-02 Season season
- Manager: Bobby Williamson (until 25 February); Jim Jefferies (from 28 February)
- Stadium: Rugby Park
- SPL: Seventh place
- Scottish Cup: Fourth round'
- League Cup: Third round
- UEFA Cup: First round
- Top goalscorer: League: Tommy Johnson (7); All: Craig Dargo (8)
- Highest home attendance: 13,201 v Celtic, SPL, 4 August 1998
- Lowest home attendance: 5,642 v Motherwell, SPL, 27 April 2002
- Average home league attendance: 7,621
Home colours	Away colours

The 2001–02 season was Kilmarnock's fourth consecutive season in the Scottish Premier League. Kilmarnock also competed in the Scottish Cup, Scottish League Cup and the UEFA Cup.

== Summary ==
=== Season ===
Kilmarnock finished seventh in the Scottish Premier League with 49 points. They reached the fourth round of the Scottish Cup, losing to Celtic. They also reached the third round of the League Cup, losing to rivals Ayr United on penalties, and lost in the first round of the UEFA Cup to Viking FK. Manager Bobby Williamson departed for Hibernian in February 2002 and was replaced by former Heart of Midlothian manager Jim Jefferies.

== Results and fixtures ==
Kilmarnock's score comes first

Win Draw Loss Postponed

=== Scottish Premier League ===
Match	Date	Opponent	Venue	Result	Attendance	Scorers
1	28 July 2001	Hibernian	A	2–2	12,717	Ngonge 4', Cocard 45'
2	4 August 2001	Celtic	H	0–1	13,201	
3	12 August 2001	Motherwell	A	2–2	5,188	Ngonge 7', Mitchell 82'
4	18 August 2001	St Johnstone	H	2–1	6,480	di Giacomo 12', Pizzo 24'
5	26 August 2001	Dundee United	A	2–0	7,404	di Giacomo 13', McLaren 63'
6	8 September 2001	Aberdeen	A	0–2	10,732	
7	16 September 2001	Heart of Midlothian	H	1–0	7,504	Dargo 78'
8	23 September 2001	Dundee	H	0–1	7,052	
9	30 September 2001	Dunfermline Athletic	A	2–0	3,983	McLaren 28', Dargo 80'
10	13 October 2001	Rangers	A	1–3	49,379	Calderón 66'
11	20 October 2001	Livingston	H	1–5	7,346	Santini 4' (o.g.)
12	27 October 2001	Celtic	A	0–1	58,897	
13	3 November 2001	Hibernian	H	0–0	7,460	
14	10 November 2001	St Johnstone	H	0–1	6,008	
15	17 November 2001	Motherwell	H	2–0	6,008	Boyd 40', di Giacomo 77'
16	24 November 2001	St Johnstone	A	0–1	3,711	
17	1 December 2001	Dundee United	H	2–0	6,130	Mahood 31', Hay 56'
18	8 December 2001	Aberdeen	H	3–1	7,611	Dindeleux 12', Boyd 82', Mahood 88'
19	15 December 2001	Heart of Midlothian	A	0–2	10,027	
20	22 December 2001	Dundee	A	2–1	6,342	Mitchell 21', Murray 58'
21	26 December 2001	Dunfermline Athletic	H	0–0	6,873	
22	29 December 2001	Livingston	A	1–0	5,214	Rubio 35' (o.g.)
23	12 January 2002	Celtic	H	0–2	11,689	
24	19 January 2002	Hibernian	A	2–2	9,592	Johnson 65', McGowne 90'
25	23 January 2002	Motherwell	A	0–2	4,342	
26	30 January 2002	Rangers	H	2–2	11,589	Boyd 85', Johnson 90'
27	2 February 2002	Dundee United	A	2–0	5,774	Dargo 4', McGowne 65'
28	9 February 2002	Aberdeen	A	1–1	15,004	Johnson 51'
29	16 February 2002	Heart of Midlothian	H	3–3	7,138	Dargo 46', Johnson 52', Murray 66'
30	2 March 2002	Dundee	H	3–2	6,890	Dargo 11', McLaren 73', 90'
31	9 March 2002	Dunfermline Athletic	A	0–2	5,618	
32	16 March 2002	Livingston	H	1–1	6,936	Dargo 36'
33	20 March 2002	Rangers	A	0–5	40,768	
34	6 April 2002	Dundee	A	0–2	5,579	
35	13 April 2002	Hibernian	H	1–0	6,236	Ngonge 18'
36	20 April 2002	St Johnstone	A	3–0	2,285	Johnson 50', 59', Boyd 84'
37	27 April 2002	Motherwell	H	1–4	5,642	Johnson 68'
38	12 May 2002	Dundee United	H	2–2	6,142	Mitchell 43', Innes 47'

=== Scottish League Cup ===
Match	Date	Opponent	Venue	Result	Attendance	Scorers
Third Round	9 October 2001	Ayr United	A	0–0 (4–5 pens)	7,418	

=== Scottish Cup ===
Match	Date	Opponent	Venue	Result	Attendance	Scorers
Third round	5 January 2002	Airdrieonians	H	3–0	6,849	Mitchell 12', Sanjuán 20', Canero 33'
Fourth round	26 January 2002	Celtic	H	0–2	11,269	

=== UEFA Cup ===
Match	Date	Opponent	Venue	Result	Attendance	Scorers
Qualifyind Round 1st leg	9 August 2001	(Northern Ireland) Glenavon	A	1–0	3,511	Innes 90'
Qualifyind Round 2nd leg	23 August 2001	(Northern Ireland) Glenavon	H	1–0	7,454	Mitchell 66'
First Round 1st leg	20 September 2001	(Norway) Viking	H	1–1	8,000	Dargo 73'
First Round 2nd leg	27 September 2001	(Norway) Viking	A	0–2	4,599	

== Player statistics ==
As of 12 May 2002 (UTC)

No.	Pos	Nat	Player	Total		Premier League		League Cup		Scottish Cup		UEFA Cup	
No.	Pos	Nat	Player	Apps	Goals	Apps	Goals	Apps	Goals	Apps	Goals	Apps	Goals
1	GK	(Scotland) SCO	Gordon Marshall	43	0	36+0	0	1+0	0	2+0	0	4+0	0
2	DF	(France) FRA	Mickaël Pizzo	18	1	10+3	1	0+1	0	0+0	0	2+2	0
3	DF	(Scotland) SCO	Greg Shields	5	0	5+0	0	0+0	0	0+0	0	0+0	0
4	DF	(Scotland) SCO	Peter Canero	38	1	31+1	0	1+0	0	2+0	1	2+1	0
5	DF	(Scotland) SCO	Kevin McGowne	24	2	22+0	2	0+0	0	2+0	0	0+0	0
6	MF	(France) FRA	Christophe Cocard	13	1	4+6	1	0+0	0	0+0	0	1+2	0
7	MF	(Scotland) SCO	Mark Reilly	2	0	0+2	0	0+0	0	0+0	0	0+0	0
8	MF	(Spain) ESP	Jesús Sanjuán	23	1	18+2	0	0+0	0	1+0	1	2+0	0
9	DF	(England) ENG	Sean Hessey	15	0	13+2	0	0+0	0	0+0	0	0+0	0
10	MF	(Scotland) SCO	Ian Durrant	1	0	0+1	0	0+0	0	0+0	0	0+0	0
11	MF	(Scotland) SCO	Ally Mitchell	41	5	33+1	3	1+0	0	2+0	1	4+0	1
12	GK	(Scotland) SCO	Colin Meldrum	3	0	2+1	0	0+0	0	0+0	0	0+0	0
13	FW	(France) FRA	David Merdy	1	0	0+0	0	0+0	0	0+0	0	1+0	0
14	MF	(Scotland) SCO	Alan Mahood	39	2	33+0	2	1+0	0	1+0	0	4+0	0
15	FW	(France) FRA	Jérôme Vareille	3	0	3+0	0	0+0	0	0+0	0	0+0	0
16	DF	(Scotland) SCO	Martin Baker	7	0	6+0	0	1+0	0	0+0	0	0+0	0
17	DF	(France) FRA	Frédéric Dindeleux	34	1	27+0	1	1+0	0	2+0	0	4+0	0
18	FW	(Democratic Republic of the Congo) COD	Michel Ngonge	12	3	7+2	3	0+0	0	0+0	0	3+0	0
19	FW	(Scotland) SCO	Craig Dargo	33	7	25+4	6	1+0	0	0+1	0	1+1	1
20	FW	(Scotland) SCO	Andy McLaren	31	2	13+13	2	1+0	0	1+0	0	1+2	0
21	DF	(Scotland) SCO	Chris Innes	25	2	20+0	1	1+0	0	0+0	0	4+0	1
22	FW	(Scotland) SCO	Kris Boyd	32	4	11+17	4	0+1	0	1+1	0	1+0	0
23	MF	(Scotland) SCO	Mark Canning	2	0	0+1	0	0+0	0	0+0	0	0+1	0
24	DF	(Scotland) SCO	Garry Hay	32	1	26+0	1	0+0	0	2+0	0	4+0	0
25	MF	(Spain) ESP	Antonio Calderón	21	1	9+8	1	1+0	0	1+0	0	2+0	0
26	MF	(Scotland) SCO	James Fowler	33	0	22+6	0	0+0	0	1+0	0	2+2	0
27	FW	(Scotland) SCO	Gary McCutcheon	4	0	2+1	0	1+0	0	0+0	0	0+0	0
28	MF	(Scotland) SCO	Gary McDonald	7	0	1+5	0	0+0	0	0+1	0	0+0	0
29	GK	(Scotland) SCO	Colin Stewart	0	0	0+0	0	0+0	0	0+0	0	0+0	0
30	FW	(Scotland) SCO	Paul Di Giacomo	27	3	15+8	3	0+0	0	1+0	0	2+1	0
34	DF	(Scotland) SCO	Shaun Dillon	2	0	1+1	0	0+0	0	0+0	0	0+0	0
35	MF	(Scotland) SCO	Stevie Murray	21	2	16+3	2	0+0	0	2+0	0	0+0	0
36	GK	(Scotland) SCO	Craig Samson	0	0	0+0	0	0+0	0	0+0	0	0+0	0
37	FW	(England) ENG	Tommy Johnson	12	7	7+3	7	0+0	0	1+1	0	0+0	0
38	FW	(Scotland) SCO	Emilio Jaconelli	4	0	0+3	0	0+0	0	0+1	0	0+0	0

== Final league table ==
Pos	Team	Pld	W	D	L	GF	GA	GD	Pts	Qualification or relegation (Note: Teams played each other three times (33 matches), before the league split into two groups (the top six and the bottom six) for the last five matches.)
5	Heart of Midlothian	38	14	6	18	52	57	−5	48	
6	Dunfermline Athletic	38	12	9	17	41	64	−23	45	
7	Kilmarnock	38	13	10	15	44	54	−10	49	
8	Dundee United	38	12	10	16	38	59	−21	46	
9	Dundee	38	12	8	18	41	55	−14	44	

Source: Scottish Professional Football League
Rules for classification: (1) Points; (2) Goal difference; (3) Goals scored

=== Division summary ===
Round	1	2	3	4	5	6	7	8	9	10	11	12	13	14	15	16	17	18	19	20	21	22	23	24	25	26	27	28	29	30	31	32	33	34	35	36	37	38
Ground	A	H	A	H	A	A	H	H	A	A	H	A	H	H	H	A	H	H	A	A	H	A	H	A	A	H	A	A	H	H	A	H	A	A	H	A	H	H
Result	D	L	D	W	W	L	W	L	W	L	L	L	D	L	W	L	W	W	L	W	D	W	L	D	L	D	W	D	D	W	L	D	L	L	W	W	L	D
Position	8	9	9	8	4	6	4	5	5	6	6	8	8	7	8	5	5	5	5	5	5	4	4	4	5	6	5	5	5	5	5	6	7	7	7	7	7	7

A = Away; H = Home; W = Win; D = Draw; L = Loss

== Transfers ==
=== Players in ===
Player	From	Fee
(France) Mickaël Pizzo	(France) Red Star	Free
(Democratic Republic of the Congo) Michel Ngonge	(England) Queen's Park Rangers	Free
(Algeria) Kamar Cherrad	(France) AS Cannes	Free
(France) David Merdy	Free Agent	Free
(England) Tommy Johnson	(England) Sheffield Wednesday	Free
(Scotland) Greg Shields	(England) Charlton Athletic	Loan

=== Players out ===
Player	To	Fee
(Scotland) Ally McCoist	Retired	
(England) Sam Keevill	(England) Sutton United	Free
(Scotland) Paul Wright	(Scotland) Falkirk	Free
(Scotland) Gus MacPherson	(Scotland) Dunfermline Athletic	Free
(Scotland) Stuart Davidson	(Scotland) Queen of the South	Free
(Scotland) Neil MacFarlane	(Scotland) Airdrieonians	Free
(Scotland) Colin Stewart	(Scotland) Stranraer	Loan
(Scotland) Mark Reilly	(Scotland) Airdrieonians	Loan
(France) Jérôme Vareille	(Scotland) Airdrieonians	Free
(France) Mickaël Pizzo	(France) Grenoble	Free
