= 2005–06 Kilmarnock F.C. season =

Kilmarnock
2005–06 season
- Manager: Jim Jefferies
- Stadium: Rugby Park
- SPL: Fifth place
- Scottish Cup: Third round
- League Cup: Third round
- Top goalscorer: League: Kris Boyd (15); All: Kris Boyd (17)
- Highest home attendance: 12,426 v Rangers, SPL, 11 December 2005
- Lowest home attendance: 4,644 v Livingston, SPL, 27 August 2005
- Average home league attendance: 7,071
Home colours	Away colours

The 2005–06 season was Kilmarnock's seventh consecutive season in the Scottish Premier League, having competed in it since its inauguration in 1998–99. Kilmarnock also competed in the Scottish Cup and the League Cup.

== Summary ==
=== Season ===
Kilmarnock finished fifth in the Scottish Premier League with 55 points. They reached the third round of the League Cup, losing to Dunfermline and the third round of the Scottish Cup, losing to Hearts.

== Results and fixtures ==
Win Draw Loss Postponed

=== Scottish Premier League ===
Match	Date	Opponent	Venue	Result	Attendance	Scorers
1	30 July 2005	Heart of Midlothian	H	2–4	7,487	Naismith 12’ Greer 74’
2	6 August 2005	Aberdeen	A	2–1	13,661	Johnston 1’ Naismith 72’
3	13 August 2005	Motherwell	H	4–1	5,035	Johnston 12’ Boyd 19’, 73’ McDonald 61’
4	20 August 2005	Inverness CT	A	2–2	4,854	Nish 71’ Boyd 74’
5	27 August 2005	Livingston	H	3–0	4,644	Nish 28’, 35’, 43’
6	10 September 2005	Dunfermline Athletic	H	3–2	4,737	Dodds 8’ Boyd 33’ Invincible 90’
7	17 September 2005	Rangers	A	0–3	49,076	
8	24 September 2005	Falkirk	H	1–1	5,507	Boyd 23’ (Pen.)
9	1 October 2005	Dundee United	A	0–0	6,915	
10	15 October 2005	Hibernian	A	2–4	11,731	Ford 7’ Fowler 40’
11	23 October 2005	Celtic	H	0–1	10,544	
12	26 October 2005	Heart of Midlothian	A	0–1	16,536	
13	29 October 2005	Aberdeen	H	4–2	5,798	Ford 18’ Invincible 19’ Boyd 47’, 57’
14	5 November 2005	Motherwell	A	2–2	4,979	Boyd 9’, 90’
15	19 November 2005	Inverness CT	H	2–2	4,708	Boyd 54’ Naismith 56’
16	26 November 2005	Livingston	A	3–0	3,446	Boyd 26’, 82’ Naismith 29’
17	3 December 2005	Dunfermline Athletic	A	1–0	4,319	Boyd 41’
18	11 December 2005	Rangers	H	2–3	12,426	McDonald 61’ Boyd 82’
19	17 December 2005	Falkirk	A	2–1	4,804	Fowler 50’ Boyd 90’
20	26 December 2005	Dundee United	H	2–1	5,749	McDonald 38’ Wales 90’
21	2 January 2006	Hibernian	H	2–2	9,224	Naismith 30’ Wales 90’
22	14 January 2006	Celtic	A	2–4	59,995	Naismith 24’ (Pen.) Invincible 51’
23	21 January 2006	Heart of Midlothian	H	1–0	8,811	Invincible 46’
24	28 January 2006	Aberdeen	A	2–2	10,540	Naismith 24’ (Pen.) 31’ Lilley 85’
25	8 February 2006	Motherwell	H	2–0	5,169	Wales 34’, 51’
26	11 February 2006	Inverness CT	A	3–3	3,618	Naismith 27’ Wales 69’, 85’
27	18 February 2006	Livingston	H	3–1	5,266	Wales 22’ Naismith 27’ invincible 59’
28	4 March 2006	Dunfermline Athletic	H	1–0	5,507	Invincible 9’
29	11 March 2006	Rangers	A	0–4	49,442	
30	18 March 2006	Falkirk	H	2–1	5,443	Invincible 3’ Naismith 74’
31	25 March 2006	Dundee United	A	2–2	5,830	Naismith 13’, 18’
32	5 April 2006	Hibernian	A	1–2	10,427	Wales 19’
33	9 April 2006	Celtic	H	1–4	10,978	Nish 89’
34	15 April 2006	Heart of Midlothian	A	0–2	16,497	
35	22 April 2006	Aberdeen	A	0–0	10,634	
36	29 April 2006	Rangers	A	1–3	11,583	Nish 27’
37	3 May 2006	Celtic	A	0–2	48,649	
38	7 May 2006	Hibernian	H	3–1	5,732	Naismith 48’ (Pen.) Greer 72’ Nish 75’

=== Scottish League Cup ===
Match	Date	Opponent	Venue	Result	Attendance	Scorers
Second Round	23 August 2005	Stirling Albion	H	4–1	3,124	Dodds 42’ Invincible 56’ Wales 75’ Di Giacomo 90’
Third Round	20 September 2005	Dunfermline Athletic	H	3–4	3,193	Boyd 53’, 90+3 Wilson (o.g.) 73’

=== Scottish Cup ===
Match	Date	Opponent	Venue	Result	Attendance	Scorers
Third Round	7 January 2006	Heart of Midlothian	A	1–2	12,831	Nish 86’

== Player statistics ==
As of 7 May 2006 (UTC)

No.	Pos	Nat	Player	Total		Premier League		League Cup		Scottish Cup	
No.	Pos	Nat	Player	Apps	Goals	Apps	Goals	Apps	Goals	Apps	Goals
1	GK	(Scotland) SCO	Alan Combe	35	0	32+0	0	2+0	0	1+0	0
2	MF	(Scotland) SCO	James Fowler	40	2	38+0	2	1+0	0	1+0	0
3	DF	(Scotland) SCO	Garry Hay	37	0	35+0	0	1+0	0	1+0	0
4	DF	(Scotland) SCO	David Lilley	13	1	8+3	1	0+1	0	1+0	0
5	DF	(Scotland) SCO	Gordon Greer	30	2	27+0	2	2+0	0	1+0	0
6	DF	(Jamaica) JAM	Simon Ford	35	2	32+0	2	2+0	0	1+0	0
7	MF	(Scotland) SCO	Gary McDonald	28	4	16+11	3	1+0	1	0+0	0
8	MF	(Scotland) SCO	Gary Locke	16	0	10+5	0	1+0	0	0+0	0
9	FW	(Scotland) SCO	Kris Boyd	20	17	18+1	15	1+0	2	0+0	0
10	FW	(Scotland) SCO	Gary Wales	32	9	18+12	8	0+1	1	1+0	0
11	FW	(Australia) AUS	Danny Invincible	39	8	34+3	7	2+0	1	0+0	0
12	MF	(Scotland) SCO	Allan Johnston	39	2	36+1	2	1+0	0	1+0	0
13	GK	(Scotland) SCO	Graeme Smith	7	0	6+1	0	0+0	0	0+0	0
14	FW	(Scotland) SCO	Steven Naismith	41	13	34+4	13	1+0	0	1+1	0
15	FW	(Scotland) SCO	Colin Nish	37	8	25+9	7	2+0	0	1+0	1
16	MF	(Scotland) SCO	Rhian Dodds	13	2	6+5	1	2+0	1	0+0	0
17	MF	(France) FRA	Eric Skora	0	0	0+0	0	0+0	0	0+0	0
18	DF	(Scotland) SCO	Frazer Wright	28	0	27+0	0	0+0	0	1+0	0
19	MF	(Scotland) SCO	Stevie Murray	18	0	1+14	0	1+1	0	0+1	0
20	FW	(Scotland) SCO	Paul Di Giacomo	14	1	2+10	0	0+1	1	0+1	0
21	DF	(Australia) AUS	Lindsay Wilson	13	0	11+2	0	0+0	0	0+0	0
22	MF	(Scotland) SCO	Peter Leven	8	0	4+2	0	2+0	0	0+0	0
23	MF	(Scotland) SCO	Jamie Hamill	0	0	0+0	0	0+0	0	0+0	0
24	FW	(Scotland) SCO	Robert Campbell	2	0	0+2	0	0+0	0	0+0	0
25	MF	(Greece) GRE	Georgios Fotakis	0	0	0+0	0	0+0	0	0+0	0
26	GK	(Scotland) SCO	Cameron Bell	0	0	0+0	0	0+0	0	0+0	0
30	MF	(Scotland) SCO	Jamie Adams	0	0	0+0	0	0+0	0	0+0	0
31	FW	(Scotland) SCO	Tommy Coyne	0	0	0+0	0	0+0	0	0+0	0
33	FW	(Scotland) SCO	Rory Loy	0	0	0+0	0	0+0	0	0+0	0
38	MF	(Scotland) SCO	Iain Flannigan	0	0	0+0	0	0+0	0	0+0	0
41	DF	(Scotland) SCO	Ryan O'Leary	0	0	0+0	0	0+0	0	0+0	0

== Final league table ==
Pos	Team	Pld	W	D	L	GF	GA	GD	Pts	Qualification or relegation (Note: Teams played each other three times (33 matches), before the league split into two groups (the top six and the bottom six) for the last five matches.)
3	Rangers	38	21	10	7	67	37	+30	73	Qualification for the UEFA Cup first round
4	Hibernian	38	17	5	16	61	56	+5	56	Qualification for the UEFA Intertoto Cup second round (Note: Hibernian qualified for the 2006 UEFA Intertoto Cup by being the highest place applicant for the competition.)
5	Kilmarnock	38	15	10	13	63	64	−1	55	
6	Aberdeen	38	13	15	10	46	40	+6	54	
7	Inverness Caledonian Thistle	38	15	13	10	51	38	+13	58	

Source: Scottish Professional Football League
Rules for classification: 1) Points; 2) Goal difference; 3) Goals scored

=== Division summary ===
Round	1	2	3	4	5	6	7	8	9	10	11	12	13	14	15	16	17	18	19	20	21	22	23	24	25	26	27	28	29	30	31	32	33	34	35	36	37	38
Ground	H	A	H	A	H	H	A	H	A	A	H	A	H	A	H	A	A	H	A	H	H	A	H	A	H	A	H	H	A	H	A	A	H	A	A	H	A	H
Result	L	W	W	D	W	W	L	D	D	L	L	L	W	D	D	W	W	L	W	W	D	L	W	D	W	D	W	W	L	W	D	L	L	L	D	L	L	W
Position	10	7	4	4	3	3	5	4	5	5	5	6	5	5	5	5	4	4	5	4	5	5	5	5	5	5	5	5	5	4	4	5	5	5	5	6	6	5

A = Away; H = Home; W = Win; D = Draw; L = Loss

== Transfers ==
=== Players in ===
Player	From	Fee
(Scotland) Frazer Wright	(Scotland) Stranraer	Free
(Scotland) Ryan O'Leary	(Scotland) Aberdeen	Undisclosed
(Greece) Georgios Fotakis	(Greece) Egaleo	Free
(France) Eric Skora	(England) Preston North End	Free
(Australia) Lindsay Wilson	(Netherlands) PSV Eindhoven	Loan

=== Players out ===
Player	To	Fee
(France) Frédéric Dindeleux	(Belgium) Zulte Waregem	Free
(Scotland) Steven Masterton	(Scotland) Clyde	Free
(Scotland) Craig Dargo	(Scotland) Inverness CT	Free
(Scotland) Craig Samson	(Scotland) Dundee United	Free
(Scotland) Neil McGregor	(Scotland) Clyde	Free
(Scotland) Kris Boyd	(Scotland) Rangers	£500,000
(Scotland) Shaun Dillon	(Scotland) Queen of the South	Free
