= Graeme Smith (footballer, born 1982) =

Scottish footballer

Personal information
- Full name: Graeme Smith
- Date of birth: 3 October 1982 (age 44)
- Place of birth: Bellshill, Scotland
- Position: Goalkeeper

Senior career*
| Years | Team | Apps | (Gls) |
| 2000–2007 | Kilmarnock | 43 | (0) |
| 2001–2002 | → Queens Park (loan) | 22 | (0) |
| 2002–2003 | → Stenhousemuir (loan) | 32 | (0) |
| 2007–2009 | Rangers | 1 | (0) |
| 2009–2011 | St Johnstone | 38 | (0) |
| 2011–2012 | St Mirren | 0 | (0) |
| 2012–2017 | Peterhead | 159 | (0) |
| 2017–2018 | Raith Rovers | 22 | (0) |
| Total | | 317 | (0) |
- * Club domestic league appearances and goals

Graeme Smith (born 3 October 1982) is a Scottish football coach and former player. He played as a goalkeeper for several Scottish clubs, including Kilmarnock, Queens Park, Stenhousemuir, St Johnstone, Peterhead and Raith Rovers. Since retiring from playing in 2018 he has worked as a goalkeeping coach.

== Playing career ==
=== Kilmarnock ===
Bellshill-born Smith joined Kilmarnock from their boys club in 2000. He was loaned to Queens Park in the 2001–02 season, making 24 appearances in total and then to Stenhousemuir the following season, where he started 34 matches. Smith finally made his Kilmarnock début on 7 March 2004, as a substitute during a 1–1 draw with Hearts.

Smith was an unused substitute in the 2007 Scottish League Cup Final, when Kilmarnock lost 5–1 to Hibernian. After spending most of his time with Killie as a reserve keeper, firstly to Gordon Marshall and then to Alan Combe, Smith refused the clubs offer of a new contract at the end of the 2006–07 season and subsequently left, having made 47 appearances in total for the Rugby Park side.

=== Rangers ===
Smith's move to Rangers was announced on 27 June 2007. He signed a three-year deal and arrived on a free transfer. He made his Rangers début on 23 January 2008 in a 6–0 Scottish Cup win over East Stirlingshire. Smith was an unused substitute in the 2008 UEFA Cup Final and the 2008 Scottish Cup Final. The latter Rangers won 3–2 to give Smith his first career honour. He left the club in 2009, having only made that one début appearance against East Stirlingshire in two seasons.

=== St Johnstone ===
Smith joined St Johnstone on 10 July 2009, after some impressive performances for the Saints, unfortunate finger injuries saw Smith lose his place in the starting XI to experienced Finnish international, Peter Enckelman.

=== St Mirren ===
Smith signed a one-year contract with St Mirren on 9 June 2011, following the departure of Paul Gallacher to Dunfermline Athletic. Once again injury struck prior to the start of the season and Smith could not oust Craig Samson as first choice.

=== Peterhead ===
Smith signed a short-term contract with Peterhead in November 2012 and was an influential part of the title winning squad of 2013–14. Smith's outstanding form resulted in a place in the PFA League Two Team of the Year. After five years with the club, Smith was released at the end of the 2016–17 season following the club's relegation to Scottish League Two.

=== Raith Rovers ===
Smith signed a short-term contract with Raith Rovers in August 2017 taking him through to January 2018. After spending the full season with the club, he was released in May 2018.

== Coaching career ==
After retiring as a player in 2018, Smith became a goalkeeper coach at Rangers. He worked there with young goalkeepers including Robby McCrorie, Jay Hogarth and Lewis Budinauckas. He moved to the Scottish Football Association in March 2024, becoming their goalkeeping performance and coach education manager.

== Career statistics ==
As of match played 4 November 2017

Appearances and goals by club, season and competition
| Club | Season | League | | | Scottish Cup | | League Cup | | Other | | Total | |
| Club | Season | Division | Apps | Goals | Apps | Goals | Apps | Goals | Apps | Goals | Apps | Goals |
|---|---|---|---|---|---|---|---|---|---|---|---|---|
| Queen's Park (loan) | 2001–02 | Third Division | 22 | 0 | 0 | 0 | 1 | 0 | 1 (Note: Appearances in the Scottish Challenge Cup) | 0 | 24 | 0 |
| Stenhousemuir (loan) | 2002–03 | Second Division | 32 | 0 | 2 | 0 | 1 | 0 | 0 | 0 | 35 | 0 |
| Kilmarnock | 2003–04 | Premier League | 3 | 0 | 0 | 0 | 0 | 0 | — | | 3 | 0 |
| Kilmarnock | 2004–05 | Premier League | 6 | 0 | 0 | 0 | 0 | 0 | — | | 6 | 0 |
| Kilmarnock | 2005–06 | Premier League | 7 | 0 | 0 | 0 | 0 | 0 | — | | 7 | 0 |
| Kilmarnock | 2006–07 | Premier League | 27 | 0 | 1 | 0 | 3 | 0 | — | | 31 | 0 |
| Kilmarnock | Kilmarnock total | | 43 | 0 | 1 | 0 | 3 | 0 | 0 | 0 | 47 | 0 |
| Rangers | 2007–08 | Premier League | 0 | 0 | 1 | 0 | 0 | 0 | 0 | 0 | 1 | 0 |
| Rangers | 2008–09 | Premier League | 0 | 0 | 0 | 0 | 0 | 0 | 0 | 0 | 0 | 0 |
| Rangers | Rangers total | | 0 | 0 | 1 | 0 | 0 | 0 | 0 | 0 | 1 | 0 |
| St Johnstone | 2009–10 | Premier League | 29 | 0 | 2 | 0 | 2 | 0 | — | | 33 | 0 |
| St Johnstone | 2010–11 | Premier League | 9 | 0 | 0 | 0 | 2 | 0 | — | | 11 | 0 |
| St Johnstone | St Johnstone total | | 38 | 0 | 2 | 0 | 4 | 0 | 0 | 0 | 44 | 0 |
| St Mirren | 2011–12 | Premier League | 0 | 0 | 0 | 0 | 0 | 0 | 0 | 0 | 0 | 0 |
| Peterhead | 2012–13 | Third Division | 25 | 0 | 0 | 0 | 0 | 0 | 4 (Note: Appearances in the Second Division play-offs) | 0 | 29 | 0 |
| Peterhead | 2013–14 | League Two | 36 | 0 | 1 | 0 | 1 | 0 | 1 | 0 | 39 | 0 |
| Peterhead | 2014–15 | League One | 36 | 0 | 1 | 0 | 1 | 0 | 3 | 0 | 41 | 0 |
| Peterhead | 2015–16 | League One | 36 | 0 | 1 | 0 | 1 | 0 | 7 (Note: Five appearances in the Scottish Challenge Cup and two in the Championship play-offs) | 0 | 45 | 0 |
| Peterhead | 2016–17 | League One | 26 | 0 | 1 | 0 | 5 | 0 | 4 (Note: Appearances in the League One play-offs) | 0 | 36 | 0 |
| Peterhead | Peterhead total | | 159 | 0 | 4 | 0 | 8 | 0 | 19 | 0 | 190 | 0 |
| Raith Rovers | 2017–18 | League One | 8 | 0 | 0 | 0 | 0 | 0 | 2 | 0 | 10 | 0 |
| Career total | | | 302 | 0 | 10 | 0 | 17 | 0 | 22 | 0 | 351 | 0 |

== Honours ==
Rangers

- Scottish Cup: 2007–08
- UEFA Cup : Runner-up: 2007–08

Peterhead

- Scottish League Two Champions: 2013–14
- PFA League Two Team of the Year: 2013–14
