= 2000–01 Scottish League Cup =

2000–01 Co-operative Insurance Cup
Tournament details
- Country: Scotland

Final positions
- Champions: Celtic
- Runners-up: Kilmarnock

Tournament statistics
- Top goal scorer: Henrik Larsson (5)

The 2000–01 Scottish League Cup was the 55th staging of the Scotland's second most prestigious football knockout competition.

The competition was won by Celtic, who defeated Kilmarnock 3–0 in the final.

== First round ==
Home team	Score	Away team
Dumbarton	(p)0 – 0	Ayr United
Arbroath	2–0	Brechin City
Clyde	5–1	Morton
Clydebank	0–2	Alloa Athletic
Cowdenbeath	3–0	Elgin City
East Fife	1–2	Raith Rovers
East Stirlingshire	2–1	Hamilton Academical
Montrose	1–0	Berwick Rangers
Partick Thistle	1–2	Airdrieonians
Peterhead	2–3	Inverness Caledonian Thistle
Queen of the South	2–1	Forfar Athletic
Queen's Park	2–0	Stranraer
Ross County	1–0	Albion Rovers
Stirling Albion	0–1	Stenhousemuir

== Second round ==
Home team	Score	Away team
Dundee	3–0	Montrose
Alloa Athletic	0–3	Dundee United
Clyde	1–2	Kilmarnock
Dumbarton	0–4	Livingston
Dunfermline Athletic	1–0	East Stirlingshire
Falkirk	3–1	Queen of the South
Inverness Caledonian Thistle	0–2	Airdrieonians
Queen's Park	0–3	Motherwell
Raith Rovers	2–1	Arbroath
Ross County	1–3	St Mirren
St Johnstone	3–1	Cowdenbeath
Stenhousemuir	1–2	Hibernian

== Third round ==
Home team	Score	Away team
Dunfermline Athletic	2–0	Motherwell
Falkirk	1–2	Hibernian
Livingston	0–2	Heart of Midlothian
Rangers	4–2	Aberdeen
Celtic	4–0	Raith Rovers
Dundee United	(p)0 – 0	Airdrieonians
St Johnstone	0–1	Kilmarnock
St Mirren	3–0	Dundee

== Quarter-finals ==
Home team	Score	Away team
Heart of Midlothian	2–5	Celtic
Kilmarnock	2–1	Hibernian
Rangers	2–0	Dundee United
St Mirren	2–1	Dunfermline Athletic

== Semi-finals ==
6 February 2001

St Mirren	0–3	Kilmarnock
	Report	McLaren 39'; Dargo 69'; Canero 78'

Hampden Park, Glasgow
Attendance: 9,213
Referee: Kenny Clark

7 February 2001

Celtic	3–1	Rangers
Sutton 6'; Larsson 17', 69' (pen.)	Report	Albertz 37' (pen.)

Hampden Park, Glasgow
Attendance: 50,000
Referee: Willie Young

== Final ==
18 March 2001

Celtic	3–0	Kilmarnock
Larsson 47', 74', 81'	Report

Hampden Park, Glasgow
Attendance: 48,830
Referee: Hugh Dallas
