= Gary McDonald (footballer, born 1982) =

Scottish footballer

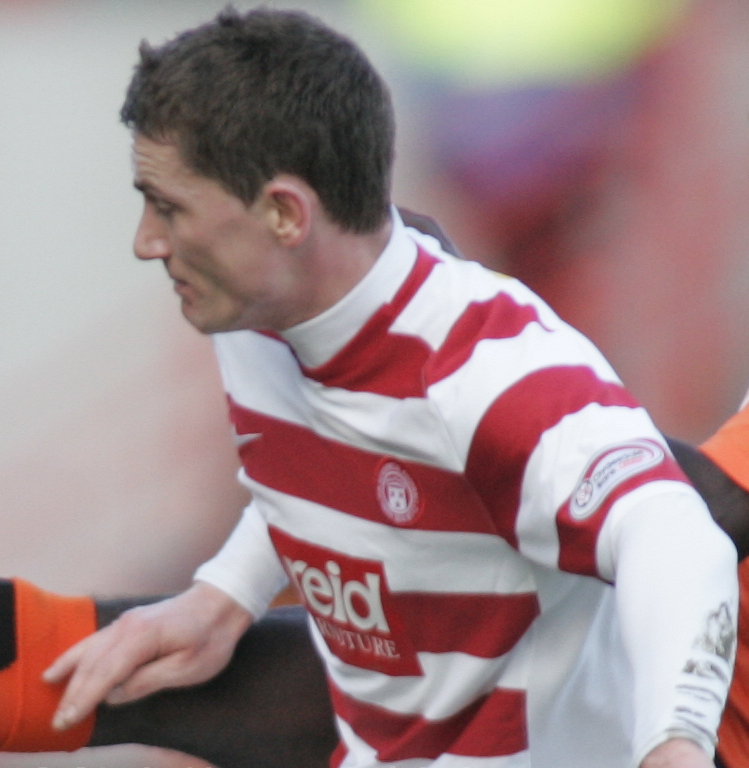
- McDonald playing for Hamilton Academical in 2011

Personal information
- Full name: Gary Matthew McDonald
- Date of birth: 10 April 1982 (age 44)
- Place of birth: Irvine, Scotland
- Position: Midfielder

Team information
- Current team: Kilwinning Rangers

Senior career*
Years	Team	Apps	(Gls)
2001–2006	Kilmarnock	106	(11)
2006–2008	Oldham Athletic	78	(11)
2008–2010	Aberdeen	52	(8)
2010–2011	Hamilton Academical	25	(0)
2011–2013	Morecambe	85	(6)
2013–2015	St Johnstone	45	(1)
2015	Peterhead	15	(7)
2015–2016	Kilwinning Rangers	0	(0)

International career
2005	Scotland B	1	(1)
- * Club domestic league appearances and goals as of 18:47, 11 September 2015 (UTC)

Gary Matthew McDonald (born 10 April 1982 in Irvine, North Ayrshire) is a Scottish professional footballer who last played for Scottish Junior club Kilwinning Rangers. He also played for Kilmarnock, Oldham Athletic, Aberdeen, Hamilton Academical, Morecambe, St Johnstone and Peterhead.

== Club career ==
McDonald started his career at Kilmarnock, playing there for five seasons between 2001 and 2006, where he played in 106 league matches, scoring 11 goals.

On 18 June 2006, McDonald signed for English League One side Oldham Athletic, becoming John Sheridan's first signing as Oldham manager. On 5 January 2008, McDonald scored from 23 metres (25 yd) in Oldham's 1–0 win over Premier League side Everton in the third round of the FA Cup. Interviewed on Match of the Day after the match, McDonald described the goal as the best of his career.

In late April 2008, McDonald agreed a pre-contract to sign for Aberdeen in the summer. On 21 November 2009, McDonald was sent off during Aberdeen's 1–1 draw against Motherwell, shown a second yellow card having removed his shirt after scoring Aberdeen's equaliser. During his second season at Aberdeen, McDonald, along with teammate Mark Kerr was the subject of booing from some Aberdeen fans. McDonald said this didn't bother him, describing it as "water off a duck's back".

McDonald left Aberdeen once his contract expired, and he joined fellow SPL club Hamilton Academical on 4 August 2010. On 14 May 2011, he was one of eight players released by Hamilton following their relegation to the First Division.

On 23 June 2011, McDonald returned to England, signing for Morecambe of League Two. It was announced on 27 May 2013, that McDonald would be leaving Morecambe after turning down a new contract with the club.

McDonald signed for St Johnstone on 13 June 2013. He made his debut for the club on 18 July 2013, in a 1–0 win away to Rosenborg in the Europa League. On 6 January 2014, McDonald signed a new contract, keeping him at St Johnstone until 2015, with an option for another year. He came on as a substitute as they won the 2014 Scottish Cup Final. On 2 February 2015, McDonald was released by St Johnstone.

On 12 February 2015, McDonald signed for Peterhead until the end of the 2014–15 season.

In July 2015, McDonald signed for Junior club Kilwinning Rangers on a one-year contract.

== International career ==
McDonald has been capped by Scotland at Under-21 level.

He was capped in a Scotland B international against Poland, in 2005, at his then club ground, Rugby Park, scoring the opening goal in a 2–0 victory.

== Career statistics ==
As of 11 September 2015

Appearances and goals by club, season and competition
Club	Season	League			Cup		League Cup		Other^{[A]}		Total	
Club	Season	Division	Apps	Goals	Apps	Goals	Apps	Goals	Apps	Goals	Apps	Goals
Kilmarnock	2001–02	Scottish Premier League	6	0	1	0	0	0	0	0	7	0
Kilmarnock	2002–03	Scottish Premier League	12	2	0	0	1	0	0	0	13	2
Kilmarnock	2003–04	Scottish Premier League	23	3	2	1	0	0	0	0	25	4
Kilmarnock	2004–05	Scottish Premier League	38	3	3	1	2	1	0	0	43	5
Kilmarnock	2005–06	Scottish Premier League	27	3	0	0	1	0	0	0	28	3
Kilmarnock	Total		106	11	6	2	4	1	0	0	116	14
Oldham Athletic	2006–07	League One	43	7	4	0	0	0	2	0	49	7
Oldham Athletic	2007–08	League One	35	4	5	2	2	0	1	0	43	6
Oldham Athletic	Total		78	11	9	2	2	0	3	0	92	13
Aberdeen	2008–09	Scottish Premier League	28	5	1	0	2	1	0	0	31	6
Aberdeen	2009–10	Scottish Premier League	24	3	2	1	1	0	2	0	29	4
Aberdeen	Total		52	8	3	1	3	1	2	0	60	10
Hamilton Academical	2010–11	Scottish Premier League	25	0	0	0	1	0	0	0	26	0
Morecambe	2011–12	League Two	42	3	1	0	2	0	1	0	46	3
Morecambe	2012–13	League Two	43	3	3	1	2	0	1	0	49	4
Morecambe	Total		85	6	4	1	4	0	2	0	95	7
St Johnstone	2013–14	Scottish Premiership	29	0	4	1	3	1	4	0	40	2
St Johnstone	2014–15	Scottish Premiership	16	0	0	0	1	0	2	0	19	0
St Johnstone	Total		45	0	4	1	4	1	6	0	59	2
Peterhead	2014–15	Scottish League One	15	7	0	0	0	0	0	0	15	7
Career total			406	43	26	7	18	3	13	0	463	53

A. Other includes Football League play-offs, Football League Trophy and UEFA Europa League.
