= Mickaël Wolski =

French football player (b. 1979)

Personal information
- Date of birth: 5 March 1979 (age 47)
- Place of birth: Moulins, France
- Position: Defender

Senior career*
Years	Team	Apps	(Gls)
199x-20xx	FC Gueugnon	16	(0)
2001–2003	US Boulogne	37+	(0+)
2003–2004	Gazélec Ajaccio	28	(0)
2004–2005	Kilmarnock F.C.	0	(0)
2005	Shamrock Rovers F.C.		
2005–2006	Stockport County F.C.	20	(1)
2006	Chester City F.C. (trial)		
2006	Bury F.C. (trial)		
2007	Moulins Yzeure Foot		
2007–2008	AC Arles-Avignon	21	(0)
2008–2011	Sporting Club Toulon	13	(0)
2011–2013	Moulins Yzeure Foot	43	(0)
2013-201x	Bergerac Périgord FC	9	(1)
- * Club domestic league appearances and goals

Mickaël Wolski (born 5 March 1979 in France) is a French retired footballer who last played for Bergerac Périgord in his home country.

== Career ==
Wolski started his senior career with Guegnon in the late 1990s. In 2005, he signed for Stockport County in the English Football League Two, where he made twenty-three appearances and scored two goals. After that, he played for Moulins Yzeure Foot, AC Arles-Avignon, Sporting Club Toulon, and Bergerac Périgord before retiring.
