= Éric Joly =

French footballer (born 1972)

Personal information
- Full name: Éric André Joly
- Date of birth: 6 October 1972 (age 54)
- Place of birth: Valenciennes, France
- Height: 1.81 m (5 ft 11 1/2 in)
- Position: Midfielder

Senior career*
Years	Team	Apps	(Gls)
1989–1994	Nice (B team)		
1994–1995	Pau FC	27	(0)
1995–1996	US Fécamp	22	(0)
1996–1998	FC Rouen	60	(3)
1998–1999	Kortrijk	24	(2)
1999–2002	Gent	66	(12)
2001–2002	→ Eendracht Aalst (loan)	19	(1)
2002–2004	Mons	53	(5)
2004	Kilmarnock	7	(0)
2005	Oostende	15	(2)
2006	Roeselare	13	(0)
2007–2009	Peruwelz		
- * Club domestic league appearances and goals

Éric André Joly (born 6 October 1972) is a French retired professional football player.
