= Mickaël Pizzo =

French footballer (born 1979)

Personal information
- Date of birth: 26 March 1979 (age 47)
- Place of birth: Saint-Denis, France
- Height: 1.68 m (5 ft 6 in)
- Position: Midfielder

Team information
- Current team: Poissy (head coach)

Senior career*
Years	Team	Apps	(Gls)
1998–2001	Red Star	52	(2)
2001–2002	Kilmarnock	13	(1)
2002–2004	Grenoble	21	(0)
2004–2006	Moissy Cramayel US	34	(4)
2006–2007	US Avranches		
2007–2009	AS Poissy	3	(0)

Managerial career
- 2020–: Poissy
- * Club domestic league appearances and goals

Mickaël Pizzo (born 26 March 1979) is a French former professional footballer who played as a midfielder and current manager of AS Poissy.

== Career ==
Pizzo was born in Saint-Denis.

During his time at Kilmarnock he scored once against St Johnstone.
