= Robbie Henderson =

Scottish footballer (born 1982)

Personal information
- Date of birth: 11 October 1982 (age 44)
- Place of birth: Scotland
- Position: Defender

Team information
- Current team: Arthurlie

Youth career
- 1990–1999: Seafar Villa
- 1999–2000: Leeds United

Senior career*
Years	Team	Apps	(Gls)
2000–2003	Kilmarnock	0	(0)
2001–2002	→ Raith Rovers (loan)	8	(0)
2001–2002	→ Brechin City (loan)	6	(0)
2002	→ Queen of the South (loan)	2	(0)
2003–2004	Greenock Morton	32	(1)
2004–2007	Stenhousemuir	68	(0)
2007	Pollok		
2007	Berwick Rangers	1	(0)
2007–2008	Bo'ness United		
2011–2012	Glenafton Athletic		
2012–2013	Kirkintilloch Rob Roy		
2013–	Pollok F.C.		
- * Club domestic league appearances and goals as of 20:00, 7 March 2013 (UTC)

Robbie Henderson (born 11 October 1982) is a Scottish footballer, who plays as a defender for Pollok F.C. in the Scottish Junior Football Association, West Region. He has also played in midfield during his career.

== Career ==
Henderson started his career on the books of Leeds United, where he won Young Players Player of the Year, 1999, before making his way to Scotland to sign for Scottish Premier League side Kilmarnock.

He never made an appearance for the Killie first team, partly due to a fractured eye socket at the hands of one of his team-mates, but was sent out on loan to Raith Rovers, and Queen of the South where he managed a few appearances at each club.

When he was released by Kilmarnock, he signed for Greenock Morton in the Scottish Football League Second Division as part of John McCormack, Henderson won a championship medal for the third division.

After around 18 months at Morton, Henderson moved on to Stenhousemuir before leaving the senior game in 2007 to sign for Junior side Pollok after a deal with Berwick Rangers fell through after one appearance, then on to Bo'ness United until he was transfer listed in July 2008.

Henderson returned to the Junior game in March 2011 with Glenafton Athletic and captained the club to the West Super League First Division title in 2011–2012. He left Glenafton for Kirkintilloch Rob Roy in October the following season.

On 24 January 2016, Henderson join Arthurlie as assistant manager.

== Honours ==
- Scottish Football League Third Division: 1

2002–2003 (with Morton)
