= Peter Leven =

Scottish footballer

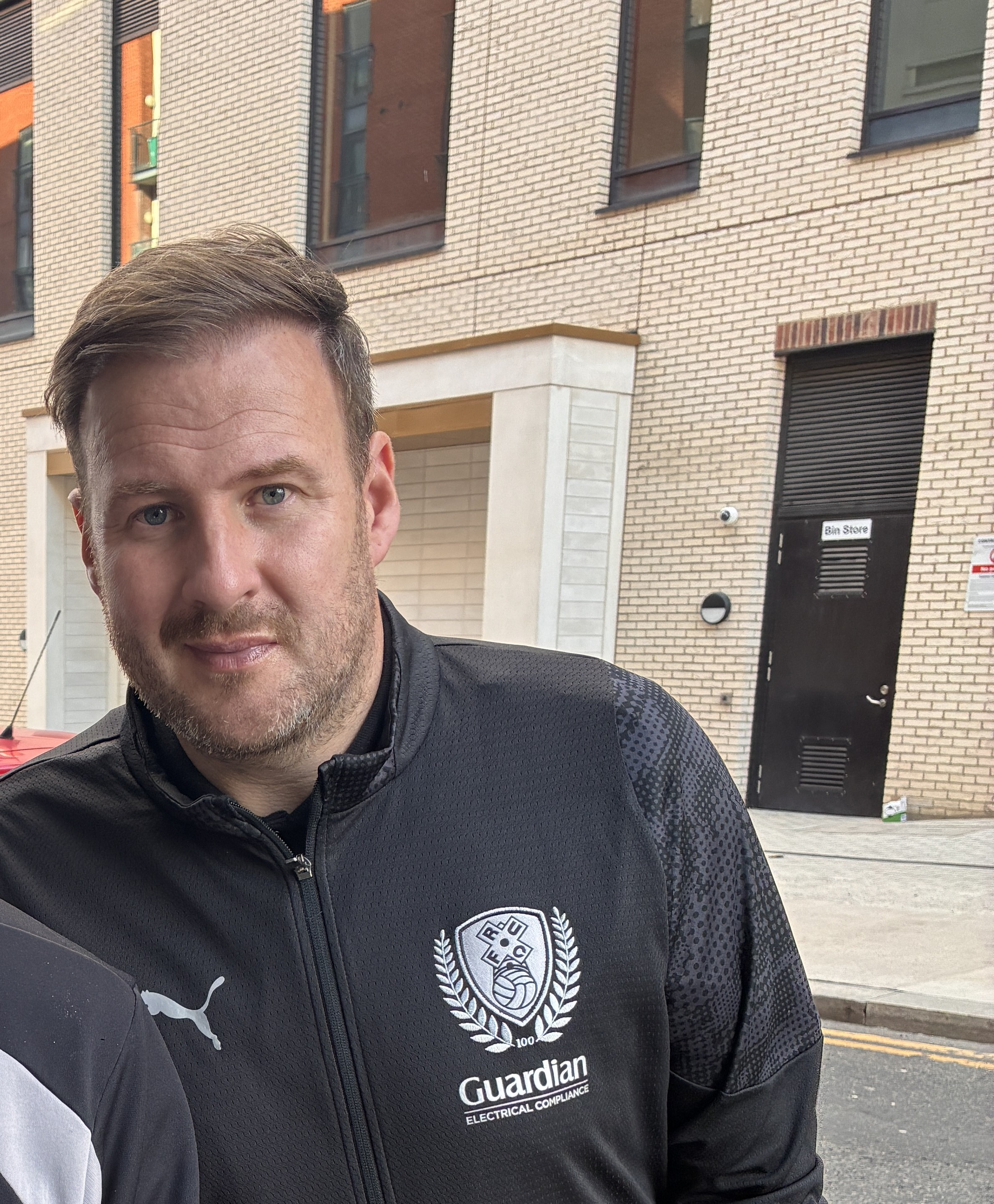
- Leven in 2026

Personal information
- Full name: Peter McDonald Leven
- Date of birth: 27 September 1983 (age 43)
- Place of birth: Renfrew, Scotland
- Height: 5 ft 11 in (1.80 m)
- Position: Midfielder

Team information
- Current team: Yelimay (Head coach)

Senior career*
Years	Team	Apps	(Gls)
2000–2004	Rangers	0	(0)
2004–2007	Kilmarnock	65	(5)
2007–2008	Chesterfield	42	(5)
2008–2011	Milton Keynes Dons	120	(22)
2011–2013	Oxford United	59	(12)
2014–2015	Jarrow Roofing BCA	29	(0)
Total		315	(44)

International career
2004–2005	Scotland U21	4	(0)

Managerial career
- 2014–2015: Middlesbrough (academy)
- 2015–2017: Kilmarnock (assistant)
- 2018: Dynamo Brest B
- 2018–2020: Dynamo Brest (assistant)
- 2021–2023: Orenburg (assistant)
- 2024: Aberdeen (caretaker)
- 2024: Aberdeen (caretaker)
- 2026: Aberdeen (caretaker)
- 2026-: Rotherham (assistant)
- 2026 -: Yelimay (Head coach)
- * Club domestic league appearances and goals

Peter McDonald Leven (born 27 September 1983) is a Scottish football coach and former player who is currently the manager of Kazakhstan Premier League club Yelimay. Leven played as a midfielder for Kilmarnock, Chesterfield, Milton Keynes Dons and Oxford United. He made over 300 career appearances and represented Scotland at the under-21 level.

== Playing career ==
=== Rangers ===
Leven was a youth player with Rangers and as a 16-year-old appeared on the bench four times for the first team, including an Old Firm match. A year later, he suffered a serious knee injury in a pre-season game, which ruled him out for two years.

=== Kilmarnock ===
Leven signed for Kilmarnock in 2004, where he established himself in the first team. He played 65 times for Kilmarnock and, at the end of the 2006–07 season, he rejected Kilmarnock's contract offer to head down south.

=== Chesterfield ===
Leven joined Chesterfield on a free transfer in 2007. As Aaron Downes made a poor start to the 2007–08 season, Leven was given the captaincy of League Two side Chesterfield. He appeared in 44 of their 49 games in the 2007–08 season. The club turned down numerous offers from Brighton up to £125,000 in the January transfer window. Chesterfield then failed to gain promotion and he turned down a contract extension.

=== Milton Keynes Dons ===
Leven joined Milton Keynes Dons in June 2008 on a free transfer. He won the League 1 Sports Writers Player of the Year for the 2010–11 season, his last for MK Dons. At the end of his contract at the Dons, Leven declined to accept the contract extension the club offered him and left as a free agent.

=== Oxford United ===
There was interest in Leven from several clubs, including Millwall; and Crystal Palace, but, in July 2011, he signed a two-year deal with League Two side Oxford United. Leven set up both Oxford United goals in their 2–1 away win over arch-rivals Swindon on 21 August 2011, their first victory at the County Ground for 38 years. On 29 October 2011, during a home game against Port Vale, with the game at 1–1, Leven intercepted the ball inside his own half and lobbed the opposition keeper from the halfway line, which turned out to be the winning goal and one of the best ever goals scored at the Kassam Stadium.

=== Retirement ===
While a free agent, Leven was linked with Paul Ince's Blackpool; however, in August 2014, he signed for non-league Jarrow Roofing BCA. Leven retired soon after joining Roofing at the age of 29, having struggled throughout his career with knee problems.

== Coaching career ==
During 2014-15, Leven worked as an academy coach at Middlesbrough. Leven was appointed to a coaching position at Scottish Premier league club Kilmarnock in June 2015, joining the club as an assistant manager. He left the club on 1 October 2017, when manager Lee McCulloch also departed.

In April 2018, joined Belarusian club Dynamo Brest. Initially employed as head of the academy and B team, he was promoted quickly to first-team assistant manager in August 2018, with an emphasis on overseeing tactics and training under head coach Marcel Lička. Brest won the 2019 Belarusian Premier League and two super cups, only losing one game in 36 matches all season and qualified for UEFA Champions League football, breaking a long period of dominance by BATE Borisov. Leven left the club in March 2020.

After leaving Belarus, Leven took up a coaching position at Russian club Orenburg, again assisting Lička. Orenburg would gain promotion to the Russian Premier League after winning the relegation play-offs.

Leven joined the coaching staff at Scottish Premiership side Aberdeen in June 2023. He was made caretaker manager after Barry Robson was sacked, taking charge of one game (a 1-1 draw with Celtic) before Neil Warnock was appointed as interim manager. Leven reverted to being the first team coach under Warnock, but was again placed in caretaker charge a month later. After a good run of results, and a shootout loss to Celtic in the Scottish Cup, Leven reverted to a coaching role after the appointment of Jimmy Thelin. Leven again served as caretaker manager after Thelin left the club in January 2026, but left the club himself after Stephen Robinson became manager in March 2026.

Rotherham United acted swiftly following the departure of previous assistant manager Dale Tonge on 24 March 2026, with Lee Clark identifying Leven as the top candidate to take the role moving forward, and he joined the League One side until the end of the season.

On 16 November 2026, Leven was appointed head coach of Kazakhstan Premier League club Yelimay, signing a one-year contract until December 2027.

== Career statistics ==
All stats from soccerbase

As of 27 December 2013

Appearances and goals by club, season and competition
Club	Season	League			FA Cup^{[A]}		League Cup^{[B]}		Other^{[C]}		Total	
Club	Season	Division	Apps	Goals	Apps	Goals	Apps	Goals	Apps	Goals	Apps	Goals
Rangers	2000–01	Scottish Premier League	0	0	0	0	0	0	0	0	0	0
Rangers	2001–02	Scottish Premier League	0	0	0	0	0	0	0	0	0	0
Rangers	2002–03	Scottish Premier League	0	0	0	0	0	0	0	0	0	0
Rangers	2003–04	Scottish Premier League	0	0	0	0	0	0	0	0	0	0
Total			0	0	0	0	0	0	0	0	0	0
Kilmarnock	2004–05	Scottish Premier League	32	4	3	0	1	1	0	0	36	5
Kilmarnock	2005–06	Scottish Premier League	6	0	0	0	2	0	0	0	8	0
Kilmarnock	2006–07	Scottish Premier League	27	1	0	0	4	0	0	0	31	1
Total			65	5	3	0	7	1	0	0	75	6
Chesterfield	2007–08	League Two	42	5	1	0	1	0	0	0	44	5
Total			42	5	1	0	1	0	0	0	44	5
Milton Keynes Dons	2008–09	League One	42	10	1	0	1	0	0	0	44	10
Milton Keynes Dons	2009–10	League One	31	4	3	0	0	0	6	0	40	4
Milton Keynes Dons	2010–11	League One	40	8	2	0	3	0	1	0	46	8
Total			113	22	6	0	4	0	7	0	130	22
Oxford United	2011–12	League Two	39	6	1	0	1	0	1	0	42	6
Oxford United	2012–13	League Two	20	4	4	1	0	0	1	1	25	6
Total			59	10	5	1	1	0	2	1	67	12
Career totals			279	42	15	1	13	1	9	1	316	45

A. The "FA Cup" column constitutes appearances (including substitutes) and goals in the FA Cup and Scottish Cup.
B. The "League Cup" column constitutes appearances (including substitutes) and goals in the Football League Cup and Scottish League Cup.
C. The "Other" column constitutes appearances (including substitutes) and goals in the Football League Trophy.

== Honours ==
- League One Sports Writers' Player of the Year: 2011
- Milton Keynes Dons Football Writers' Player of the Year: 2010–11
