= Peter Canero =

Scottish footballer

Personal information
- Full name: Peter Canero
- Date of birth: 18 January 1981 (age 45)
- Place of birth: Glasgow, Scotland
- Positions: Defender; midfielder

Senior career*
Years	Team	Apps	(Gls)
1998–2004	Kilmarnock	117	(9)
2004–2005	Leicester City	13	(0)
2005	Dundee United	11	(2)
2006	New York Red Bulls	9	(0)
Total		150	(11)

International career
2000–2003	Scotland U21	18	(1)
2002–2003	Scotland B	3	(0)
2004	Scotland	1	(0)
- * Club domestic league appearances and goals

Peter Canero (born 18 January 1981) is a Scottish former footballer, who played as a defender and midfielder. He began his career with Kilmarnock, where he made over 100 appearances. He also had brief spells with Leicester City in England, Dundee United back in Scotland and New York Red Bulls in the United States before his career ended due to injury. He made one appearance for the Scotland national team in 2004.

== Career ==
Canero, who is of Spanish descent through his grandfather who fled the country during the Spanish Civil War, came up through the youth ranks at Kilmarnock. He made his first-team debut in August 1999 at the age of 18 as a late substitute in the home league win over Aberdeen. Featuring in nearly a dozen matches that season, Canero began season 2000–01 as a first-team regular, scoring his first goals for the club in February 2001 in the League Cup semi-final win against St Mirren and subsequent league win against St Johnstone to help Kilmarnock qualify for Europe. At the start of the 2002–03 season and between January and March 2003, he scored five goals in six league appearances. By December 2003, Canero was establishing himself as one of the most promising players in Scotland and with his contract expiring in June 2004, was offered a new three-year deal in December 2003. Celtic were interested in signing Canero, but were unable to offer a transfer fee for him to move in January 2004. Later that month, Canero moved to Premier League side Leicester City.

Canero did not make his Leicester debut until mid-March, due to a hip and knee problem, when he appeared as a late substitute in the win at Birmingham City. He went on to appear in around half of the remaining fixtures that season in the Premiership, most notably against Leeds when he missed a glorious chance to win the game. After undergoing a hip operation and missing the last two games of the season, Canero struggled to make an impact in the Leicester first team due to injury, and he featured only six times before the New Year. His last appearance came in November 2004 and after being an unused substitute on several occasions, he was released by mutual consent in July 2005. He moved to Dundee United on a short-term loan deal in September 2005, before signing with MetroStars of Major League Soccer in January 2006. He was waived by the team, now known as New York Red Bulls, at the end of an injury-hit season during which he played only 278 minutes for the club. He subsequently retired due to persistent injuries.

Canero was capped for Scotland at all youth levels (U15s, U16s and U17s), including 18 appearances for the under-21 team. He also appeared three times for the Scotland B team, against Germany, Turkey and Croatia. Canero was given his first (and only) cap for the senior national team in April 2004, as an early substitute in the friendly match against Denmark.

== Career statistics ==
Club performance			League		Cup		League Cup		Continental		Total	
Season	Club	League	Apps	Goals	Apps	Goals	Apps	Goals	Apps	Goals	Apps	Goals
Scotland			League		Scottish Cup		League Cup		Europe		Total	
1999–00	Kilmarnock	Scottish Premier League	11	0	-		-		-		11	0
2000–01	Kilmarnock	Scottish Premier League	28	1	4	0	2	1	-		34	2
2001–02	Kilmarnock	Scottish Premier League	32	0	2	1	1	0	3	0	38	1
2002–03	Kilmarnock	Scottish Premier League	33	6	-		-		-		33	6
2003–04	Kilmarnock	Scottish Premier League	13	2	-		1	0	-		14	2
England			League		FA Cup		League Cup		Europe		Total	
2003–04	Leicester City	FA Premier League	7	0	-		-		-		7	0
2004–05	Leicester City	Football League Championship	6	0	-		-		-		6	0
Scotland			League		Scottish Cup		League Cup		Europe		Total	
2005–06	Dundee United	Scottish Premier League	11	2	-		1	0	-		12	2
USA			League		Open Cup		League Cup		North America		Total	
2006	New York Red Bulls	Major League Soccer	9	0	-		-		-		9	0
Total	Scotland		128	11	6	1	4	1	3	0	154	14
Total	England		13	0	0	0	0	0	0	0	15	0
Total	USA		9	0	0	0	0	0	0	0	11	0
Career total			154	11	6	1	4	1	3	0	17	197
