= Chris Innes =

Scottish footballer (born 1976)

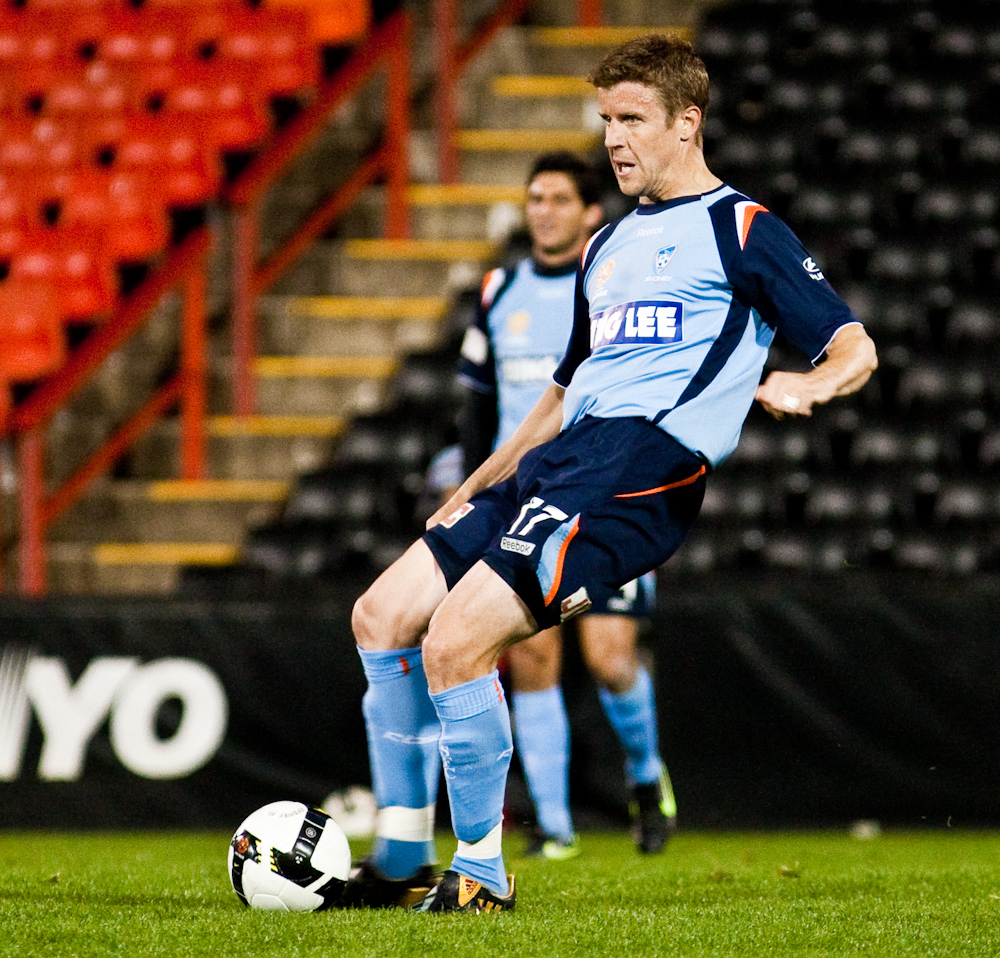
- Innes playing for Sydney FC in a trial match, 2009

Personal information
- Date of birth: 13 July 1976 (age 50)
- Place of birth: Broxburn, West Lothian, Scotland
- Position: Defender

Senior career*
Years	Team	Apps	(Gls)
1994–1996	Blackburn United	44	(8)
1996–1998	Stenhousemuir	35	(2)
1998–2003	Kilmarnock	75	(3)
1999	→ St Mirren (loan)	9	(0)
1999	→ Falkirk (loan)	2	(0)
2003–2005	Dundee United	45	(2)
2005–2008	Gretna	89	(12)
2008–2009	Livingston	30	(1)
2009–2010	St Mirren	21	(3)
2010–2011	Inverness Caledonian Thistle	13	(1)
2011	East Fife (trial)	1	(0)
2012	Arbroath	12	(2)
Total		376	(34)
- * Club domestic league appearances and goals

Chris Innes (born 13 July 1976) is a Scottish football coach and former professional player who is the youth team coach at Motherwell.

== Career ==
Innes was born on 13 July 1976, in Broxburn, West Lothian, Scotland. He started his career at Stenhousemuir after joining the Warriors from Blackburn United in 1996 and moved to Kilmarnock for £50,000 in 1998. In 1999, he went out on loan twice, to St Mirren for 3 months and to Falkirk for just over a week. In 2003, he moved to Dundee United where he played exactly fifty times.

Innes signed for Gretna on a free transfer in 2005. Although he missed out on United's Scottish Cup final appearance that season as he had already left for Gretna, Innes made it the following season when the Black and Whites were runners-up against Hearts. Innes was made captain of the rising club from the borders and helped the side gain promotion from the Scottish Third Division to the Scottish Premier League. After a season of bad results and financial difficulties for Gretna, Innes was made redundant on 25 March 2008. Gretna's reason for releasing their captain was because he had "attracted interest from other clubs".

One of those clubs was New York Red Bulls of MLS, whom Innes trained with in April 2008. However, he decided against a move to the U.S. after failing to settle and returned to Scotland after two weeks, with St Johnstone and Dunfermline Athletic amongst several clubs keen to sign him. In June 2008, Innes was thought to be near completing a move back to Tayside with Dundee, but Livingston announced on their website in July 2008 that he had signed for them. On 31 July 2009, Innes left Livingston to re-sign for St Mirren.

=== St Mirren ===
Innes scored his first St Mirren goal against Hibernian on 21 November 2009 and netted his second for the club against Kilmarnock on 2 January 2010. His third goal for the Buddies came against Aberdeen on 12 January, resulting in a 1–0 win, just a week after his second, ramming in a volley from an Andy Dorman corner.

On 10 June 2010, St Mirren announced that Innes was to leave the club when his contract expired.

=== Inverness Caledonian Thistle ===
Innes joined newly promoted SPL club Inverness Caledonian for the 2010–11 season on 20 July 2010, ahead of interest from former club Kilmarnock, Dundee and Falkirk. At the end of the 2010–11 season Innes announced that he would be leaving the club due to wanting to spend more time with his family in Edinburgh.

=== East Fife ===
Following his departure from Inverness Caledonian Thistle, Innes had trial period at East Fife playing for them in a Scottish Second Division fixture against Brechin City. However, he decided against joining them permanently as he wanted to join a full-time club.

=== Arbroath ===
On 8 February 2012, Innes signed for Scottish Second Division club Arbroath until the end of the season. The deal was confirmed by manager Paul Sheerin via Twitter. He then left the club after this deal expired in May 2012.

== Career statistics ==
Appearances and goals by club, season and competition
Club	Season	League		National cup		League cup		Other		Total	
Club	Season	Apps	Goals	Apps	Goals	Apps	Goals	Apps	Goals	Apps	Goals
Stenhousemuir	1996–97	2	0	N/A		N/A		–		2	0
Stenhousemuir	1997–98	30	2	2	0	1	0	–		33	2
Stenhousemuir	Total	32	2	2	0	1	0	0	0	35	2
Kilmarnock	1998–99	4	1	–		–		–		4	1
Kilmarnock	1999–2000	5	0	–		–		2	0	7	0
Kilmarnock	2000–01	24	0	2	0	3	0	–		29	0
Kilmarnock	2001–02	20	1	–		1	0	4	1	25	2
Kilmarnock	2002–03	20	1	1	0	1	0	–		22	1
Kilmarnock	2003–04	1	0	–		–		–		1	0
Kilmarnock	Total	75	3	3	0	5	0	6	1	89	4
St Mirren (loan)	1998–99	9	0	1	0	–		–		10	0
Falkirk (loan)	1999–00	2	0	–		–		–		2	0
Dundee United	2003–04	29	1	–		2	0	–		31	1
Dundee United	2004–05	16	1	–		3	1	–		19	2
Dundee United	Total	45	2	0	0	5	1	0	0	50	3
Gretna	2004–05	11	2	–		–		–		11	2
Gretna	2005–06	31	8	6	0	2	0	–		39	8
Gretna	2006–07	26	2	2	0	1	0	1	0	30	2
Gretna	2007–08	21	0	2	0	–		–		23	0
Gretna	Total	75	3	3	0	5	0	6	1	89	4
Livingston	2008–09	30	1	0	0	3	0	1	0	15	1
Livingston	2009–10	–		–		–		1	0	1	0
Livingston	Total	30	1	0	0	3	0	2	0	35	1
St Mirren	2009–10	9	3	0	0	0	0	0	0	4	1
Career total		273	19	16	0	17	1	9	1	315	21

== Honours ==
Kilmarnock

- Scottish League Cup runner-up: 2000–01

Gretna

- Scottish First Division: 2006–07
- Scottish Second Division: 2005–06
- Scottish Third Division: 2004–05
- Scottish Cup runner-up: 2005–06
