= Barry McLaughlin =

Scottish footballer

Personal information
- Full name: Barry McLaughlin
- Date of birth: 19 April 1973 (age 53)
- Place of birth: Paisley, Scotland
- Height: 6 ft 1 in (1.85 m)
- Position: Defender

Senior career*
Years	Team	Apps	(Gls)
1992–2002	St Mirren	266	(12)
2002–2004	Kilmarnock	36	(1)
2004–2006	Ayr United	55	(0)

Managerial career
- 2021–2022: Glenvale U20
- 2022-2023: Thorn Athletic
- 2023-2024: Giffnock SC
- 2025: Rossvale FC
- * Club domestic league appearances and goals

Barry McLaughlin (born 19 April 1973 in Paisley) is a Scottish football manager and former professional footballer. He played for St Mirren for ten years, and was captain of the St Mirren side in his last season. After this he went on to play for Kilmarnock and Ayr United. After leaving senior football in 2006 he joined the junior leagues to play for Irvine Meadow, before retiring completely in 2009.

McLaughlin was appointed manager of new West of Scotland League members Thorn Athletic in July 2022, having previously been in charge of the Glenvale under-20 team. McLaughlin was appointed manager of West of Scotland League side Rossvale FC in June of 2025.
