= Mark Canning (footballer) =

Scottish footballer

Personal information
- Date of birth: 12 September 1983 (age 43)
- Place of birth: Glasgow, Scotland
- Position: Midfielder

Team information
- Current team: Arthurlie

Senior career*
Years	Team	Apps	(Gls)
2000–2005	Kilmarnock	7	(1)
2005	Stirling Albion	16	(1)
2006–2009	Dumbarton	84	(3)
2009–2010	Albion Rovers	22	(1)
- * Club domestic league appearances and goals as of 9 April 2010

Mark Canning (born 12 September 1983 in Glasgow) is a Scottish footballer.

== Career ==
Canning started his career at Kilmarnock, making his debut on 23 August 2001 in a 1 – 0 win over Glenavon in the UEFA Cup. His league debut came nearly eight months later in May 2002, when he replaced Shaun Dillon during a 2 – 2 draw with Dundee United. However, Canning struggled to establish himself in the side and was released by Kilmarnock in 2005, joining Stirling Albion.

He remained at Forthbank Stadium for a short time, later joining Dumbarton, where he established himself in the first team, making over 90 appearances in all competitions during a three-year spell. Despite helping the side to the Scottish Third Division title, Canning was released by the club at the end of the season, instead signing with Albion Rovers. He made his debut on 25 July 2009 as a last minute substitute during a 2 – 0 win over Ayr United in the Challenge Cup, his first goal coming on 10 October in a 2 – 0 win over Elgin City.

On 27 August 2010, Canning left Albion Rovers. He is now playing amateur football.

On 10 January 2020, Canning signed for Junior Side Arthurlie.

== Honours ==
Dumbarton

- Scottish Division Three (fourth tier): Winners 2008 – 09
