= Sean Hessey =

English footballer and manager

Personal information
- Full name: Sean Peter Hessey
- Date of birth: 19 September 1978 (age 48)
- Place of birth: Whiston, England
- Height: 5 ft 11 in (1.80 m)
- Position: Defender

Youth career
- 1995–1997: Liverpool

Senior career*
Years	Team	Apps	(Gls)
1997	Leeds United	0	(0)
1997–1998	Wigan Athletic	0	(0)
1998–1999	Huddersfield Town	12	(0)
1999–2004	Kilmarnock	51	(1)
2004	Blackpool	8	(0)
2004–2008	Chester City	79	(1)
2007–2008	→ Macclesfield Town (loan)	26	(0)
2008–2010	Macclesfield Town	60	(0)
2010–2012	Accrington Stanley	58	(3)
2012–2013	Barrow	30	(0)
2013–2015	Prestatyn Town	25	(2)
2014–2015	→ Marine (loan)	24	(0)
Total		363	(7)

Managerial career
- 2015–2017: Marine
- * Club domestic league appearances and goals

Sean Peter Hessey (born 19 September 1978 in Whiston, Merseyside) is an English football manager and former professional footballer who played as a defender.

== Career ==
During a career which spanned eighteen years, Hessey played for Liverpool, Leeds United, Wigan Athletic, Huddersfield Town, Kilmarnock, Blackpool, Chester City, Macclesfield Town and Barrow.

Hessey had a fairly successful five-year spell at Scottish club Kilmarnock. However, this was marred by a number of serious knee injuries He scored his first professional goal at Kilmarnock in a 2–1 win over Livingston in September 2003.

Hessey joined Chester after the club were promoted back to the Football League in 2004 and was a first-choice player for much of his first three years at the club, although he quite often missed games because of injury and suspension problems. The most notable was a five-match ban for violent conduct at the start of the 2006–07 season after an incident in the home game against Stockport County the previous season. Hessey has proved to be a versatile player, operating in both central defensive and full back roles and also in a holding midfield spot. He scored twice at Chester; once in a Football League Trophy tie against Rochdale and once in a league match against Rushden & Diamonds.

Chester manager Bobby Williamson, who managed Hessey at Kilmarnock, placed him on the transfer list in the summer of 2007. He did not figure in the Chester 16-man matchday squad in any game for the 2007–08 season and was allowed to join League Two rivals Macclesfield Town on 10 November 2007 in a two-month loan. In January 2008, this was extended until the end of the season.

Hessey followed up his successful loan period by signing a two-year contract with Macclesfield who he went on to captain. He Left the club, along with 10 other players at the end of the 2009–10 season.

He joined Accrington Stanley in August 2010 on a twelve-month contract and signed a 1-year extension at the end of that season. On 14 May 2012 it was announced Hessey had left Stanley after failing to agree a new contract. He spent the 2012–13 season with Barrow in the Conference National, but left at the end of the season after the club were relegated. He moved to Prestatyn Town of the Welsh Premier Division for the start of the 2013–14 season.

Shortly after he joined Marine on loan (initially until January) and made his debut on 30 August 2014 in a 2–1 defeat at home to Buxton. This loan deal was extended, and Hessey subsequently became caretaker manager following the departure of Carl Macauley. An excellent run of form saw Hessey secure the managerial post with 2 games left in the season. The change in form under Sean's leadership saw Marine maintain their place in the Northern Premier League Premier Division for the 2015–16 season
