= Emilio Jaconelli =

Scottish footballer

Personal information
- Full name: Emilio Jaconelli
- Date of birth: 5 June 1983 (age 43)
- Place of birth: Lanark, Scotland
- Position: Striker

Team information
- Current team: Irvine Meadow XI

Senior career*
Years	Team	Apps	(Gls)
2001–2003	Kilmarnock	8	(1)
2003–2005	Queen of the South	19	(3)
2005–2006	Raith Rovers	11	(0)
2006–2011	Irvine Meadow XI	148	(102)
- * Club domestic league appearances and goals as of 21:27, 2 October 2009 (UTC)

Emilio Jaconelli (born 5 June 1983 in Lanark) is a Scottish former professional footballer.

Jaconelli began his career at Kilmarnock in 2001 and made his senior debut against Livingston on 29 December 2001. He made a further seven appearances for Kilmarnock before being released and moving to Queen of the South on 9 July 2003. In one match, he famously scored 9 goals within 90 minutes. Whilst in Dumfries he made over thirty appearances yet only scored three goals, all of them over a four-game spell. His first senior goal was against Brechin City on 24 April 2004. In 2005, he moved to Raith Rovers but after an unsuccessful season he left for junior football. On 5 October 2011 Irvine Meadow striker Emilio Jaconelli retired due to a long-term injury to his anterior cruciate ligament.
