= Rhian Dodds =

Scottish-Canadian soccer player

Personal information
- Full name: Rhian Dodds
- Date of birth: 3 October 1979 (age 47)
- Place of birth: Irvine, Scotland
- Position: Midfielder

Youth career
- –2003: Robert Morris College

Senior career*
Years	Team	Apps	(Gls)
2003–2009	Kilmarnock	48	(3)
2008	Dundee (loan)	4	(0)
2010	Hamilton Croatia	1	(0)

International career
	Canada U-20	1	(0)
- * Club domestic league appearances and goals as of 20:40, 23 December 2009 (UTC)

Rhian Dodds (born 3 October 1979) is soccer player who played as a midfielder in the Canadian Soccer League, and the Scottish Premiership. He also holds British citizenship, but represented Canada internationally on the Under-20 level.

== Playing career ==
Born in Irvine, Scotland, Dodds grew up in Hamilton, Ontario, Canada. He attended Robert Morris University, playing for the Colonials before joining Kilmarnock. He was given the nickname "Dick Turpin" after scoring a late winner against Motherwell at Fir Park in season 2006–07 by the stadium announcer, insinuating that Kilmarnock had "stolen" the victory with virtually the last kick of the ball.

After a seven-year tenure in Scotland he returned to his hometown of Hamilton, and signed with Hamilton Croatia of the Canadian Soccer League. Where he was united with his younger brother Jamie Dodds. He made his debut for the club on 11 June 2010 in a match against Brantford Galaxy.
