= Alan Mahood =

Scottish footballer

Personal information
- Date of birth: 26 March 1973 (age 53)
- Place of birth: Kilwinning, Ayrshire, Scotland
- Position: Midfielder

Youth career
- Bonnyton Thistle F.C.

Senior career*
Years	Team	Apps	(Gls)
1988–1991	Greenock Morton	1	(0)
1991–1992	Nottingham Forest	0	(0)
1992–1998	Greenock Morton	137	(23)
1998–2004	Kilmarnock	153	(9)
2004	Ross County	1	(0)
2004	St Johnstone	7	(0)
2004–2005	Greenock Morton	11	(0)
- * Club domestic league appearances and goals as of 16:49, 14 August 2009 (UTC)

Alan Mahood (born 26 March 1973) is a Scottish former professional footballer who played for numerous clubs including: Greenock Morton, Kilmarnock, Ross County and St Johnstone.
