= Frédéric Dindeleux =

French footballer (born 1974)

Personal information
- Date of birth: 16 January 1974 (age 52)
- Place of birth: Lille, France
- Height: 1.80 m (5 ft 11 in)
- Position: Defender

Youth career
- 1986–1993: Lille

Senior career*
Years	Team	Apps	(Gls)
1993–1999	Lille	128	(4)
1999–2005	Kilmarnock	180	(5)
2005–2008	Zulte Waregem	65	(2)
2008–2009	Oostende	26	(0)
2009–2012	Deinze	98	(1)
Total		497	(9)
- * Club domestic league appearances and goals

Frédéric Dindeleux (born 16 January 1974) is a French former professional footballer who played as a defender. Dindeleux played for Lille, Kilmarnock, Zulte Waregem, Oostende and Deinze.

== Career ==
After six years with French club Lille, Dindeleux joined Scottish club Kilmarnock under the Bosman ruling. Dindeleux, known affectionately by the fans as "Freddie", was one of Kilmarnock's most popular players between 1999 and 2005. He was attracted to the club by the prospect of playing in the UEFA Cup with Kilmarnock, as well as regular first team football. Dindeleux went on to play over 200 games for Kilmarnock, and signed two contract extensions in that time. He is fondly remembered by Kilmarnock fans for his confident and uncompromising style.
