= Craig Samson =

Scottish footballer (born 1984)

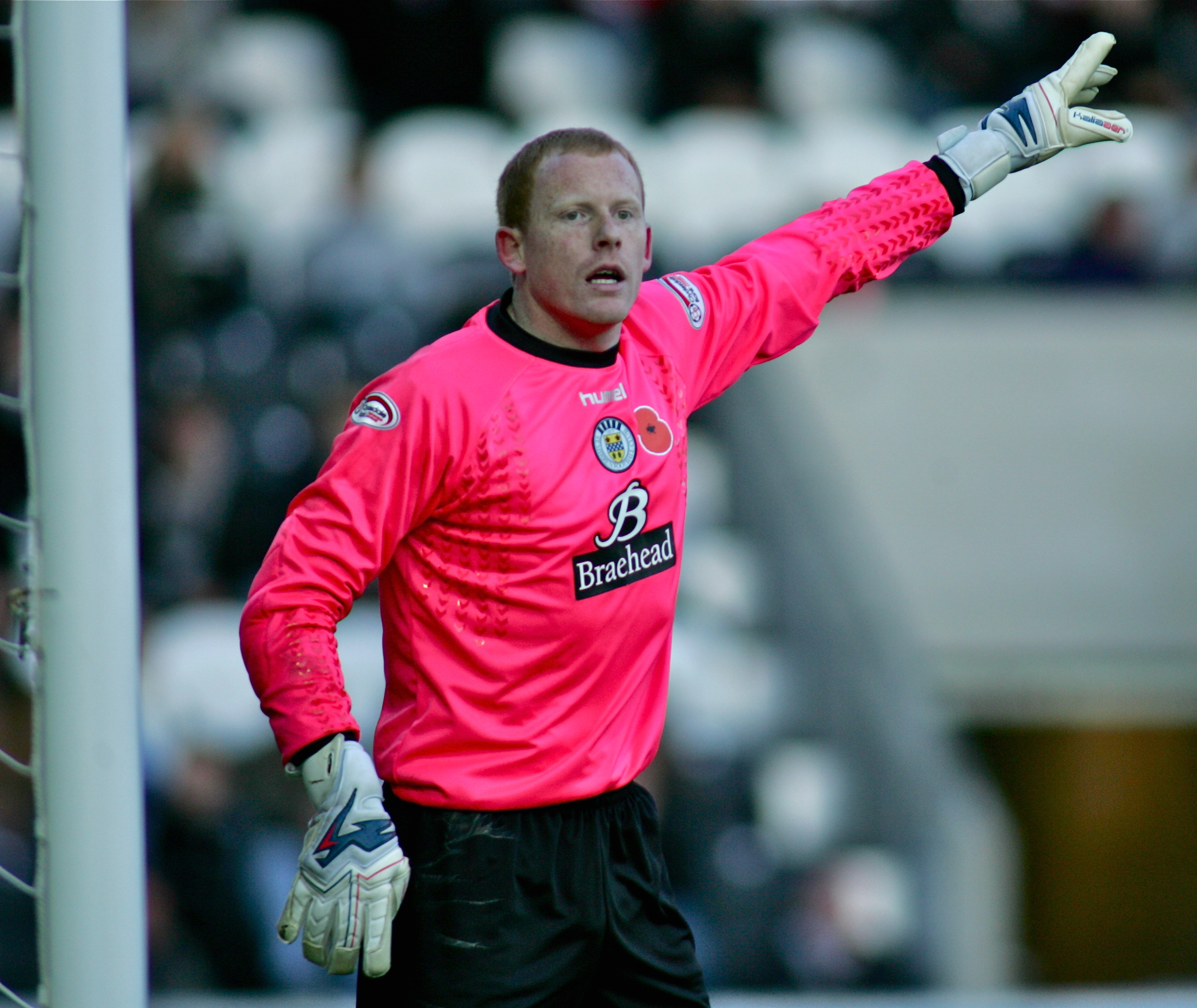
- Samson playing for St Mirren

Personal information
- Full name: Craig Ian Samson
- Date of birth: 1 April 1984 (age 42)
- Place of birth: Irvine, Scotland
- Position: Goalkeeper

Team information
- Current team: Hibernian (Goalkeeping Coach)

Senior career*
| Years | Team | Apps | (Gls) |
| 2001–2005 | Kilmarnock | 1 | (0) |
| 2004 | → Queen of the South (loan) | 12 | (0) |
| 2004 | → Queen of the South (loan) | 0 | (0) |
| 2005 | → St Johnstone (loan) | 12 | (0) |
| 2005–2006 | Dundee United | 8 | (0) |
| 2006–2007 | Ross County | 29 | (0) |
| 2007–2008 | Dundee | 31 | (0) |
| 2008–2009 | Hereford United | 11 | (0) |
| 2009–2010 | Ayr United | 32 | (0) |
| 2010–2013 | St Mirren | 87 | (0) |
| 2013–2015 | Kilmarnock | 73 | (0) |
| 2015–2017 | Motherwell | 36 | (0) |
| 2017–2018 | St Mirren | 49 | (0) |
| 2020–2021 | Hibernian | 0 | (0) |
| 2022–2024 | Aberdeen | 0 | (0) |

International career
| 2004–2005 | Scotland U21 | 6 | (0) |
- * Club domestic league appearances and goals

Craig Ian Samson (born 1 April 1984) is a Scottish football coach and a former player who is currently goalkeeping coach with Hibernian. Samson is a former Scotland under-21 internationalist, having made six appearances between 2004 and 2005.

He began his playing career with Kilmarnock, but made only one league appearance and spent time on loan to Queen of the South and St Johnstone before leaving the club in 2005. He then spent a season each with Dundee United, Ross County, Dundee, Hereford United and Ayr United. In 2010, Samson joined St Mirren, where he played for three years and won the Scottish League Cup in 2013. He rejoined his first club, Kilmarnock, in May 2013. Samson left Kilmarnock in August 2015 and subsequently signed for Motherwell.

After a second spell with St Mirren, Samson retired as a player to become goalkeeping coach at Sunderland. He has since held similar positions with Rochdale, Hibernian and Aberdeen.

== Playing career ==
=== Early career ===
Samson began his career with Kilmarnock and made his senior debut on 3 January 2004, in a Scottish Premier League match away to Aberdeen. That turned out to be his only appearance for the club.

In February 2004, 19 year old Samson moved to Queen of the South on loan and ahead of the 2004–05 season, joined the club on loan again, however he was recalled early by Kilmarnock having only played one match. On 1 January 2005, he went out on loan again, this time to St Johnstone.

In July 2005, after turning down a new contract at Kilmarnock, Samson signed for Dundee United.

On 1 June 2006, Samson joined Ross County On 12 November 2006, Ross County beat Clyde 5–4 on penalties, following a 1–1 draw, with Samson saving penalties from Neil McGregor and Chris Higgins during the shoot-out.

After spending a season with Dundee, Samson moved to England, signing for Hereford in July 2008. Samson left the English club by "mutual consent" in April 2009.

On 7 July 2009, Samson signed for newly promoted Scottish Division One club Ayr United.

=== St Mirren ===
On 13 July 2010, Samson signed for Scottish Premier League side St Mirren. After the departure of goalkeeper Paul Gallacher, Samson was made first choice goalkeeper for St Mirren for the 2011–12 season. Samson soon became a fans favourite for his willingness to dribble the ball out of his goal and for his incredible flying saves, after seven early season shut-outs, Samson's form was rewarded with a full international call up on 6 November 2011.

At the end of season 2011–12, Samson had two of his saves nominated for 'SPL Save of the Season', one being a stunning reflex to stop Sone Aluko. Outside the Old Firm, Samson and Motherwell 'keeper Darren Randolph kept the most clean sheets in the division, despite St Mirren finishing 8th in the table. On 17 March 2013, Samson played as St Mirren beat Hearts 3–2 to win the League Cup.

=== Kilmarnock ===
After rejecting a new contract offer by St Mirren, 29-year-old Samson signed a two-year deal with Kilmarnock. On 6 August 2015, Samson left Kilmarnock, agreeing a release from his contract having lost his first team place to new signing Jamie MacDonald.

=== Motherwell ===
In September 2015, Samson signed a contract with Motherwell. He made his debut on 23 April 2016, in a 1–0 win against Hearts. On 26 May 2016, he signed a new one-year contract with the club. He was released by the club in May 2017, at the end of his contract.

=== St Mirren return ===
After four years away from St Mirren, Samson rejoined the club on 7 June 2017, signing a two-year deal. Samson played every league match as Saints won the Scottish Championship title, and also broke a club record by keeping eight consecutive clean sheets in home league matches. Samson then signed an extension to his contract in May 2018, which was due to keep him at the club until the summer of 2020. Despite playing regularly for St Mirren during the 2018–19 season, Samson opted to retire from playing in November 2018 when he was offered a coaching position at Sunderland.

== International career ==
Having previously played for the Scotland under-21 side, Samson was called into the full Scotland squad in November 2011 and was also named in squads during 2012 and 2015.

== Coaching career ==
Samson took up a coaching position at Sunderland in November 2018. He left the club in November 2019 and was then appointed as the first team goalkeeping coach of League One club Rochdale the following month. He moved to Hibernian during the 2020 close season. Samson also registered as a player with Hibs, and was listed as a substitute for a League Cup match with Brora Rangers on 7 October. Hibs announced in February 2022 that Samson had left the club. After leaving Hibernian, Samson signed a short-term deal with Aberdeen in a player-coaching role due to an injury crisis at the club.

== Career statistics ==
As of match played 10 November 2018

Appearances and goals by club, season and competition
| Club | Season | League | | | National Cup | | League Cup | | Other | | Total | |
| Club | Season | Division | Apps | Goals | Apps | Goals | Apps | Goals | Apps | Goals | Apps | Goals |
|---|---|---|---|---|---|---|---|---|---|---|---|---|
| Kilmarnock | 2003–04 | Scottish Premier League | 1 | 0 | 0 | 0 | 0 | 0 | 0 | 0 | 1 | 0 |
| Kilmarnock | 2004–05 | Scottish Premier League | 0 | 0 | 0 | 0 | 0 | 0 | 0 | 0 | 0 | 0 |
| Kilmarnock | Total | | 1 | 0 | 0 | 0 | 0 | 0 | 0 | 0 | 1 | 0 |
| Queen of the South (loan) | 2003–04 | Scottish First Division | 12 | 0 | 0 | 0 | 0 | 0 | 0 | 0 | 12 | 0 |
| Queen of the South (loan) | 2004–05 | Scottish First Division | 0 | 0 | 0 | 0 | 1 | 0 | 0 | 0 | 1 | 0 |
| St Johnstone (loan) | 2004–05 | Scottish First Division | 12 | 0 | 0 | 0 | 0 | 0 | 0 | 0 | 12 | 0 |
| Dundee United | 2005–06 | Scottish Premier League | 8 | 0 | 0 | 0 | 0 | 0 | 0 | 0 | 8 | 0 |
| Ross County | 2006–07 | Scottish First Division | 29 | 0 | 1 | 0 | 2 | 0 | 3 (Note: Appearances in the Scottish Challenge Cup) | 0 | 35 | 0 |
| Dundee | 2007–08 | Scottish First Division | 31 | 0 | 2 | 0 | 2 | 0 | 1 | 0 | 36 | 0 |
| Hereford United | 2008–09 | League One | 11 | 0 | 2 | 0 | 0 | 0 | 1 (Note: Appearance in the Football League Trophy) | 0 | 14 | 0 |
| Ayr United | 2009–10 | Scottish First Division | 32 | 0 | 3 | 0 | 1 | 0 | 1 | 0 | 37 | 0 |
| St Mirren | 2010–11 | Scottish Premier League | 11 | 0 | 0 | 0 | 0 | 0 | 0 | 0 | 11 | 0 |
| St Mirren | 2011–12 | Scottish Premier League | 38 | 0 | 6 | 0 | 3 | 0 | 0 | 0 | 47 | 0 |
| St Mirren | 2012–13 | Scottish Premier League | 38 | 0 | 3 | 0 | 5 | 0 | 0 | 0 | 46 | 0 |
| St Mirren | Total | | 87 | 0 | 9 | 0 | 8 | 0 | 0 | 0 | 104 | 0 |
| Kilmarnock | 2013–14 | Scottish Premiership | 38 | 0 | 1 | 0 | 1 | 0 | 0 | 0 | 40 | 0 |
| Kilmarnock | 2014–15 | Scottish Premiership | 35 | 0 | 1 | 0 | 2 | 0 | 0 | 0 | 38 | 0 |
| Kilmarnock | 2015–16 | Scottish Premiership | 0 | 0 | 0 | 0 | 0 | 0 | 0 | 0 | 0 | 0 |
| Kilmarnock | Total | | 73 | 0 | 2 | 0 | 3 | 0 | 0 | 0 | 78 | 0 |
| Motherwell | 2015–16 | Scottish Premiership | 2 | 0 | 0 | 0 | 0 | 0 | 0 | 0 | 2 | 0 |
| Motherwell | 2016–17 | Scottish Premiership | 34 | 0 | 1 | 0 | 5 | 0 | 0 | 0 | 40 | 0 |
| Motherwell | Total | | 36 | 0 | 1 | 0 | 5 | 0 | 0 | 0 | 42 | 0 |
| St Mirren | 2017–18 | Scottish Championship | 36 | 0 | 2 | 0 | 3 | 0 | 0 | 0 | 41 | 0 |
| St Mirren | 2018–19 | Scottish Premiership | 13 | 0 | 0 | 0 | 4 | 0 | 0 | 0 | 17 | 0 |
| St Mirren | Total | | 49 | 0 | 2 | 0 | 7 | 0 | 0 | 0 | 58 | 0 |
| Career total | | | 381 | 0 | 22 | 0 | 29 | 0 | 6 | 0 | 438 | 0 |

== Honours ==
Ross County

- Scottish Challenge Cup: 2006–07

St Mirren

- Scottish League Cup: 2012–13
- Scottish Championship: 2017–18
