= Craig Dargo =

Scottish footballer

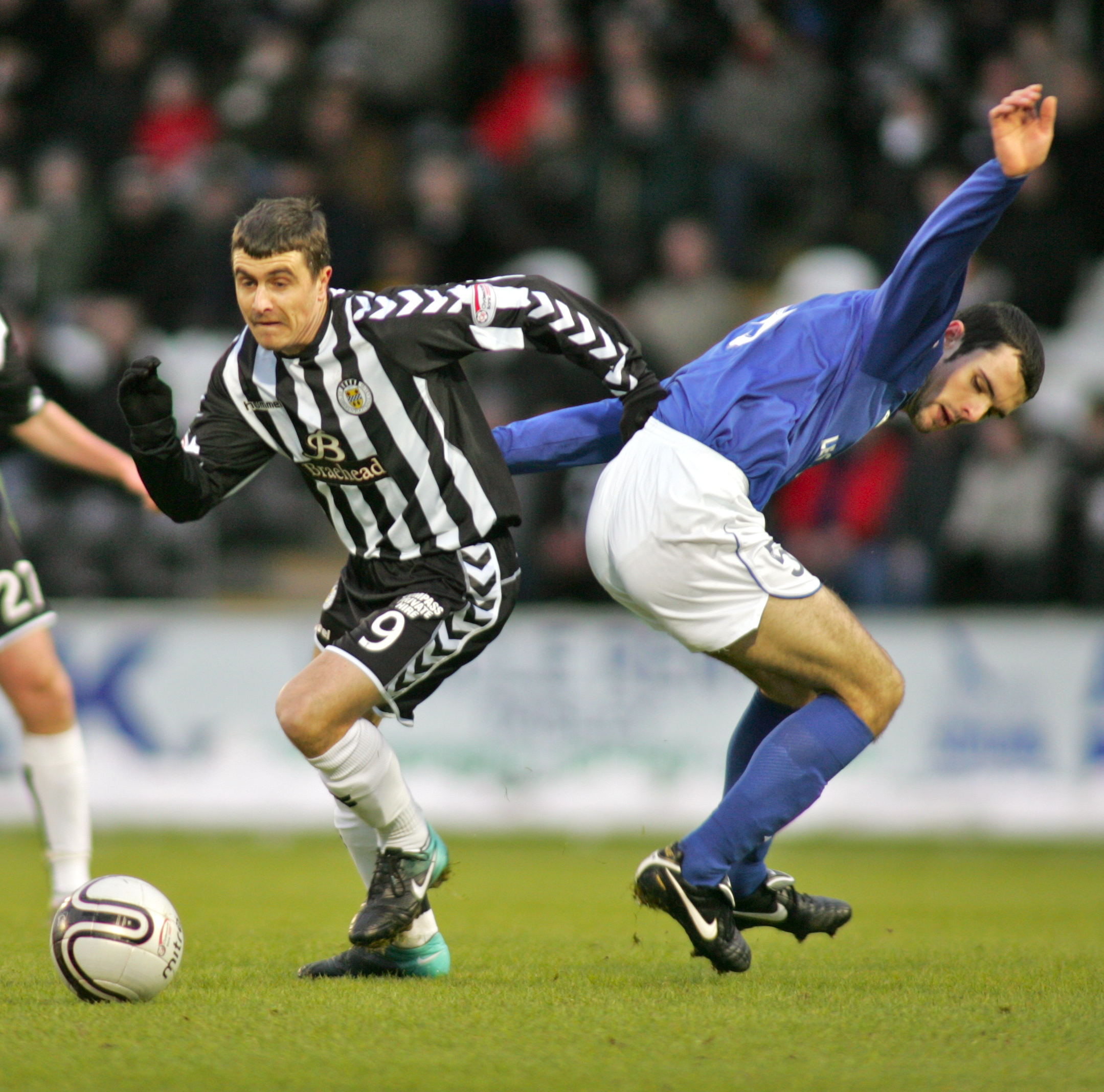
- Dargo (left) playing for St Mirren

Personal information
- Full name: Craig Peter Dargo
- Date of birth: 3 January 1978 (age 48)
- Place of birth: Edinburgh, Scotland
- Position: Striker

Youth career
- Raith Rovers

Senior career*
Years	Team	Apps	(Gls)
1995–2000	Raith Rovers	82	(36)
2000–2005	Kilmarnock	101	(29)
2005–2007	Inverness Caledonian Thistle	59	(26)
2007–2011	St Mirren	94	(12)
2011–2012	Partick Thistle	4	(0)
2012	Dumbarton	9	(5)
2012–2014	Dunfermline Athletic	33	(2)
2014–2015	Berwick Rangers	19	(4)
Total		401	(162)

International career
2006	Scotland B	1	(0)

Managerial career
- 2012–2014: Dunfermline Athletic (U20)
- * Club domestic league appearances and goals

Craig Peter Dargo (born 3 January 1978) is a Scottish former professional football player and coach. Dargo played for Raith Rovers, Kilmarnock, Inverness Caledonian Thistle, St Mirren, Partick Thistle, Dumbarton, Dunfermline Athletic and Berwick Rangers.

== Career ==
=== Early career ===
Dargo began his career with Kirkcaldy side Raith Rovers. He scored 29 goals in 82 league games before moving to Kilmarnock on a free transfer in June 2000. He remained at Rugby Park for the next five years. During this time he made his first appearance in European competition, scoring as Kilmarnock were eliminated by Norwegian side Viking in the UEFA Cup. His time at Kilmarnock was dogged by injuries, and he was released in May 2005 after over 100 games for Killie.

=== Inverness ===
In June 2005, Dargo joined Inverness Caledonian Thistle on a two-year deal, scoring his first goal during a draw against Rangers at Ibrox Stadium. In February 2006, Dargo began negotiations on a new contract, with former Inverness manager Craig Brewster, now managing Ross County, subsequently linked with signing the player. The speculation passed and Dargo made an appearance for the Scotland Future side in March 2006, going on to score 19 goals in 38 games that season.

In April 2007, weeks before the end of his contract, Inverness confirmed "a few English clubs" had expressed interest in signing Dargo. A "last go" in mid May – a record deal for the club – failed to keep him at the club, with Dargo announcing in June that he would leave Inverness.

=== St Mirren ===
On 28 June 2007, Dargo signed for St Mirren. Dargo aggravated his recurring knee injury which kept him out for several weeks, making his debut against former club Kilmarnock on 22 December 2007. Dargo scored his first goal for the club against Gretna to officially relegate them on 29 March 2008.

=== Later playing career ===
On 17 November 2011, Dargo signed a short-term contract with Partick Thistle ending in January 2012. On 8 March 2012, Dargo signed a short-term contract with Dumbarton until the end of the season scoring seven goals in 12 games, including a hat-trick against Brechin City and a brace as the Sons won promotion of the Scottish First Division. He became a player/coach at Dunfermline Athletic in 2012, working alongside John Potter. Dargo signed for Berwick Rangers on 19 August 2014. He scored his first and only goals for Berwick when he scored twice in a 3-2 Scottish Cup win against East Fife.

== Statistics ==
Club	Season	League		Cup		Lg Cup		Other		Other	
Club	Season	Apps	Goals	Apps	Goals	Apps	Goals	Apps	Goals	Apps	Goals
Raith Rovers	1995–96	3	1	0	0	0	0	0	0	3	1
Raith Rovers	1996–97	5	0	0	0	0	0	0	0	5	0
Raith Rovers	1997–98	27	8	2	0	0	0	0	0	29	8
Raith Rovers	1998–99	22	8	1	0	0	0	0	0	23	8
Raith Rovers	1999–2000	25	12	1	1	1	1	2	1	29	15
Raith Rovers	Total	82	29	4	1	1	1	2	1	89	32
Kilmarnock	2000–01	25	7	2	0	3	2	0	0	30	9
Kilmarnock	2001–02	29	6	1	0	1	0	2	1	33	7
Kilmarnock	2002–03	15	1	1	0	0	0	0	0	16	1
Kilmarnock	2003–04	12	3	0	0	0	0	0	0	12	3
Kilmarnock	2004–05	20	2	0	0	2	0	0	0	22	2
Kilmarnock	Total	101	19	4	0	6	2	2	1	113	22
Inverness Caledonian Thistle	2005–06	32	16	4	2	2	1	0	0	38	19
Inverness Caledonian Thistle	2006–07	27	10	1	2	1	0	0	0	29	12
Inverness Caledonian Thistle	Total	59	26	5	4	3	1	0	0	67	31
St Mirren	2007–08	16	1	5	0	0	0	0	0	21	1
St Mirren	2008–09	27	3	2	0	1	1	0	0	30	4
St Mirren	2009–10	29	2	3	0	4	0	0	0	29	2
St Mirren	2010–11	32	3	5	2	1	0	0	0	38	5
St Mirren	Total	104	9	15	2	6	1	0	0	125	12
Partick Thistle	2011–12	4	0	1	0	0	0	0	0	5	0
Dumbarton	2011–12	9	5	0	0	0	0	3	2	12	7
Dunfermline	2012–13	26	1	2	0	1	0	4	0	33	1
Berwick	2014–15	1	0	0	0	0	0	1	0	2	0
Career total		386	89	31	7	17	5	9	2	446	105
