= Shaun Dillon =

Scottish footballer (born 1984)

Personal information
- Date of birth: 24 August 1984 (age 42)
- Place of birth: Greenock, Scotland
- Position: Defender

Senior career*
| Years | Team | Apps | (Gls) |
| 2002–2006 | Kilmarnock | 24 | (0) |
| 2005 | → Greenock Morton (loan) | 17 | (1) |
| 2006 | Queen of the South | 7 | (0) |
| 2006–2007 | Stenhousemuir | 14 | (0) |
| 2007 | Stranraer | 11 | (0) |
| 2007–2008 | Stenhousemuir | 2 | (0) |
| 2008–2009 | Irvine Meadow | | |
| 2009–2011 | Pollok | | |
| 2011–2012 | Stirling Albion | 15 | (2) |
| 2012–2013 | Kilbirnie Ladeside | | |
| 2013–2014 | Arthurlie | | |

Managerial career
- 2021–22: Kilbirnie Ladeside (co-manager)
- * Club domestic league appearances and goals

Shaun Dillon (born 24 August 1984 in Greenock) is a Scottish football coach and former player, who played as a defender. He is currently coach of West of Scotland Football League club Beith Juniors. He began his career with Kilmarnock in the Scottish Premier League and also played in the Scottish Football League for Greenock Morton, Queen of the South, Stenhousemuir. Stranraer and Stirling Albion.

== Playing career ==
Dillon began his career with Kilmarnock in the Scottish Premier League (SPL). He made an early impact, winning the SPL Young Player of the Month award for December 2002, but disciplinary and weight issues led to him losing his first team place. He stayed with Kilmarnock until 2006, but made only 24 league appearances for the club.

After a loan spell with Greenock Morton, Dillon left Kilmarnock in January 2006 to join Queen of the South. He then played for Stenhousemuir and Stranraer before dropping into junior football in 2008, with Irvine Meadow and then Pollok.

Dillon returned to senior football when he joined Stirling Albion in June 2011. He left Stirling in the 2012 close season, joining junior club Kilbirnie Ladeside. After being transfer-listed by Kilbirnie in August 2013, Dillon joined Arthurlie later that month.

== Coaching career ==
In June 2017, Dillon joined Greenock Juniors as one of two assistants to newly-appointed manager Thomas Molloy. Dillon and Molloy left Greenock in August 2021 to become co-managers of Kilbirnie Ladeside. He left the club in May 2022.

== Personal life ==
Outside of football, Dillon works as an account manager for Hewlett-Packard.

He is a close friend of actor and former Greenock Juniors player Martin Compston; through their relationship, Compston has donated money to the club and began sponsoring Dillon personally in 2020.
