= List of foreign Scottish Premier League players =

This is a list of foreign players in the Scottish Premier League (1997–2013). The following players must meet the following three criteria:

1. Have played at least one Scottish Premier League game. Players who were signed by Scottish Premier League clubs, but only played in lower league, cup and/or European games, or did not play in any competitive games at all, are not included.
2. Signed and played for a club from the introduction of the SPL in the 1998–99 season, and prior to the dissolution of the SPL into the Scottish Premiership at the end of the 2012–2013 Scottish Premier League season. Players with careers overlapping both eras can be included, but only clubs played for during the Premier League era can be listed.
3. Are considered foreign, i.e., outside Great Britain and Ireland, determined by the following:

A player is considered foreign if he is not eligible to play for the national teams of Scotland, England, Wales, Northern Ireland or the Republic of Ireland. (Note: More specifically, If a player has been capped on international level, the national team is used; if he has been capped by more than one country, the highest level (or the most recent) team is used. These include British/Irish players with dual citizenship.; If a player has not been capped on international level, his country of birth is used, except those who were born abroad from British/Irish parents or moved to Great Britain/Ireland at a young age, and those who clearly indicated to have switched his nationality to another nation.; Clubs listed are those which the player has played at least one Scottish Premier League game for.)

== Algeria ==
- Mehdi Abeid – St Johnstone – 2013
- Madjid Bougherra – Rangers – 2008–11
- Ismaël Bouzid – Heart of Midlothian, Kilmarnock – 2009–11
- Mohamed Chalali – Aberdeen – 2011–12
- Rachid Djebaili – St Johnstone – 2001–02
- Brahim Hemdani – Rangers – 2005–09
- Khaled Kemas – Dundee, Motherwell – 2001–03
- Karim Kerkar – Dundee United – 2004–05
- Salim Kerkar – Rangers – 2010–12
- Abderraouf Zarabi – Hibernian – 2008
- Toufik Zerara – Falkirk – 2009–10

== Angola ==
- José Quitongo – Heart of Midlothian, 1998–2000, Kilmarnock – 2002–03

== Antigua and Barbuda ==
- Zaine Francis-Angol – Motherwell – 2012–13

== Argentina ==
- Gabriel Amato – Rangers – 1998–2000
- Fabián Caballero – Dundee – 2000–05
- Claudio Caniggia – Dundee, Rangers – 2000–03
- Beto Carranza – Dundee – 2000–04
- Damián Casalinuovo – Dundee United, Hamilton Academical – 2009–11
- Juan Cobián – Aberdeen – 1999–2000
- Gustavo Fuentes – Dundee United – 2000–01
- Marcelino Galoppo – Dundee United – 2000–01
- Pascual Garrido – Dundee – 2000–02
- Lucas Gatti – Dundee – 2001–02
- Julián Maidana – Livingston – 2002–03
- Franco Miranda – St Mirren – 2007–2009
- Beto Naveda – Dundee United, Dundee – 2000–02
- Federico Nieto – Rangers – 2004–05
- Fernando Pasquinelli – Livingston, Aberdeen – 2002–05
- Walter del Río – Dundee – 2000–02
- Juan Sara – Dundee – 2000–03
- Fernando Screpis – Heart of Midlothian – 2008
- Julián Speroni – Dundee – 2001–04
- Rolando Zárate – Livingston – 2002–03

== Australia ==
- Tom Rogic – Celtic F.C. – 2013–22
- Raphael Bove – Dundee United – 1999–00
- Chris Coyne – Dundee – 2000–01
- Karl Dodd – Falkirk – 2006–07
- Rostyn Griffiths – Gretna – 2007–08
- Scott Higgins – Falkirk – 2006–07
- Danny Invincibile – Kilmarnock, St Johnstone – 2003–11
- Jackson Irvine – Celtic, Kilmarnock, Ross County, Hibernian – 2012–13
- Patrick Kisnorbo – Heart of Midlothian – 2003–05
- Stuart Lovell – Hibernian, Livingston – 1998–2005
- Adrian Madaschi – Partick Thistle – 2003–04
- Daniel McBreen – Falkirk – 2005–06
- Trent McClenahan – Hamilton Academical – 2008–2010
- Andy McDermott – Dunfermline Athletic – 2003–04
- Scott McDonald – Motherwell, Celtic – 2003–10
- Steve McDonald – Motherwell – 2005
- Dylan McGowan – Heart of Midlothian – 2012–13
- Ryan McGowan – Heart of Midlothian – 2007–13
- Matt McKay – Rangers – 2011–12
- Craig Moore – Rangers – 1994–98, 1999–2005
- Aaron Mooy – St Mirren – 2010–2012
- Kevin Muscat – Rangers – 2002–03
- Erik Paartalu – Gretna – 2007–08
- Michael Panopoulos – Dunfermline Athletic – 2001–02
- Mark Robertson – Dundee – 2001–03
- Tom Rogic – Celtic F.C. – 2013–22
- Tony Vidmar – Rangers – 1997–2002
- Mark Viduka – Celtic – 1998–2000
- James Wesolowski – Dundee United, Hamilton Academical – 2008–10
- Lindsay Wilson – Kilmarnock – 2006
- David Zdrilic – Aberdeen – 2003–04

== Austria ==
- Thomas Flögel – Heart of Midlothian – 1998–2002
- Bobby Olejnik – Falkirk – 2007–10
- Alen Orman – Hibernian – 2001–05
- Thomas Piermayr – Inverness CT – 2011–12
- Roman Wallner – Falkirk – 2007–08
- David Witteveen – Heart of Midlothian – 2009–11

== Belgium ==
- Roberto Bisconti – Aberdeen – 2001–03
- Thomas Buffel – Rangers – 2004–08
- Harald Pinxten – Livingston – 2005–06
- Tonny Mols – Dundee United – 1998–99
- Joos Valgaeren – Celtic – 2000–05
- Dieter Van Tornhout – Kilmarnock – 2012

== Benin ==
- Laurent D'Jaffo – Aberdeen – 2002–03

== Bosnia and Herzegovina ==
- Mirsad Bešlija – Heart of Midlothian – 2005–07
- Saša Papac – Rangers – 2006–12
- Dubravko Tešević – Livingston – 2005–06

== Brazil ==
- Camazzola – Heart of Midlothian – 2005–06
- Alexandre Cerdeira – Dundee – 2004–05
- Edinho – Dunfermline Athletic – 1998–99
- Emerson – Rangers – 2003–04
- Juninho – Celtic – 2004–05
- Rafael Scheidt – Celtic – 1999–2000

== Bulgaria ==
- Ilian Kiriakov – Aberdeen – 1998–2000
- Tsanko Tsvetanov – Aberdeen – 1996–1998
- Stiliyan Petrov – Celtic – 1999–2006

== Cameroon ==
- Patrick Ada – Kilmarnock – 2011
- Mvondo Atangana – Dundee United – 2000–02
- Gustave Bahoken – Livingston – 2002–03, 2004–05
- Thierry Gathuessi – Hibernian, Inverness CT – 2007–09
- Guy Ipoua – Livingston – 2003–04
- Landry N'Guémo – Celtic – 2009–2010
- Jean-Joël Perrier-Doumbé – Celtic – 2006–08
- Alphonse Tchami – Dundee United – 2000–01

== Canada ==
- Nick Dasovic – St Johnstone – 1998–2002
- Rhian Dodds – Kilmarnock – 2003–08
- Paul Fenwick – Hibernian – 2000–03
- Mike Franks – Hibernian – 2000
- Marcus Haber – St Johnstone – 2010–2012
- André Hainault – Ross County – 2012–2013
- Richard Hastings – Inverness CT, Hamilton Academical – 2004–09; 2009–10
- Lars Hirschfeld – Dundee United – 2004–05
- Kevin McKenna – Heart of Midlothian – 2000–05
- Jason de Vos – Dundee United – 1998–2001
- Davide Xausa – Livingston – 2000–03

== Central African Republic ==
- Ange Oueifio – Motherwell – 2000–01
- Willi Oueifio – Heart of Midlothian – 2002–03

== Chile ==
- Mauricio Pinilla – Heart of Midlothian – 2006–08
- Sebastián Rozental – Rangers 1998–2001

== China PR ==
- Fan Zhiyi – Dundee – 2001–02
- Du Wei – Celtic – 2005–06
- Zheng Zhi – Celtic – 2009–10

== Colombia ==
- David González Giraldo – Aberdeen – 2011–12

== Congo ==
- David Louhoungou – Hamilton Academical – 2009

== Congo DR ==
- Yves Ma-Kalambay – Hibernian – 2007–10
- Michel Ngonge – Kilmarnock – 2001–02

== Côte d'Ivoire ==
- Samassi Abou – Kilmarnock – 1999–2000
- Souleymane Bamba – Dunfermline Athletic, Hibernian – 2006–07, 2008–11
- Eugène Dadi – Aberdeen, Livingston – 2001–03
- Aimé Koudou – Kilmarnock – 2006–08
- Olivier Tébily – Celtic – 1999–2002

== Croatia ==
- Nikica Jelavic – Rangers – 2010–12
- Dado Pršo – Rangers – 2004–07

== Cyprus ==
- Angelis Charalambous – Motherwell – 2010–11

== Czech Republic ==
- Roman Bednář – Heart of Midlothian – 2005–07
- Lubomír Blaha – Aberdeen – 2004–05
- Tomáš Černý – Hamilton Academical – 2008–11
- Jakub Divis – Hibernian – 2011
- Jiří Jarošík – Celtic – 2006–08
- Zdeněk Kroča – Kilmarnock – 2011–12
- Milan Mišůn – Celtic – 2010–12
- Michal Pospíšil – Heart of Midlothian – 2005–08
- Libor Sionko – Rangers – 2006–07
- Rudolf Skácel – Heart of Midlothian, Dundee United – 2005–06, 2010–2012, 2012–13
- Luděk Stracený – Heart of Midlothian – 2005–06
- Filip Twardzik – Celtic – 2012–13

== Denmark ==
- Jesper Christiansen – Rangers – 2000–01
- Jesper Christiansen – Dunfermline Athletic – 2004–05
- Thomas Gravesen – Celtic – 2006–08
- Nocko Jokovic – Livingston – 2001–02
- Peter Kjær – Aberdeen – 2001–03
- Brian Laudrup – Rangers – 1994–98
- Ulrik Laursen – Hibernian, Celtic – 2000–05
- Peter Løvenkrands – Rangers – 2000–06
- Tommy Løvenkrands – St Johnstone – 2000–02
- Morten Petersen – Livingston – 2001–02
- Morten Rasmussen – Celtic – 2010–12
- Marc Rieper – Celtic – 1998–99
- Kasper Schmeichel – Falkirk – 2006–07
- Mike Tullberg – Heart of Midlothian – 2008–09
- Morten Wieghorst – Dundee, Celtic – 1998–2002

== Ecuador ==
- Ulises de la Cruz – Hibernian – 2001–02
- Eduardo Hurtado – Hibernian – 2001–02

== Estonia ==
- Henrik Ojamaa – Motherwell – 2012–2013
- Sander Puri – St Mirren – 2013

== Faroe Islands ==
- Jákup Mikkelsen – Partick Thistle – 2003–04

== Finland ==
- Lauri Dalla Valle – Dundee Utd – 2011–12
- Peter Enckelman – St Johnstone, Heart of Midlothian – 2010–13
- Alexei Eremenko – Kilmarnock – 2010–11
- Tommi Grönlund – Heart of Midlothian – 2001–02
- Markus Heikkinen – Aberdeen – 2003–05
- Anssi Jaakkola – Kilmarnock – 2011–2013
- Jonatan Johansson – Rangers, Hibernian, St Johnstone – 1998–2000, 2008–10
- Jani Kauppila – Rangers – 2000–01
- Mikko Kavén – Motherwell – 1998–99
- Shefki Kuqi – Hibernian – 2012–13
- Juho Mäkelä – Heart of Midlothian – 2007–09
- Teuvo Moilanen – Heart of Midlothian – 2002–04
- Antti Niemi – Rangers, Heart of Midlothian – 1998–2002
- Kai Nyyssönen – Motherwell – 1998–99
- Markus Paatelainen – Inverness CT – 2006–08
- Mixu Paatelainen – Hibernian – 1999–2003
- Tero Penttilä – Rangers – 1999–2002
- Sebastian Sorsa – Hamilton Academical – 2008–09
- Simo Valakari – Motherwell – 1998–2000
- Jarkko Wiss – Hibernian – 2002–04

== France ==
- Stéphane Adam – Heart of Midlothian – 1997–2002
- Didier Agathe – Hibernian, Celtic – 2000–01, 2000–06
- Jean-Yves Anis – Partick Thistle – 2003–04
- Mickaël Antoine-Curier – Hibernian Hamilton Academical – 2007–08, 2009–10
- Frédéric Arpinon – Hibernian – 2001–03
- Hervé Bacqué – Motherwell – 1998–99
- Anthony Basso – Heart of Midlothian – 2007–09
- Olivier Bernard – Rangers – 2005–06
- Franck Bernhard – Motherwell – 2001–02
- Mohamed Berthé – Heart of Midlothian – 1998–99
- Guillaume Beuzelin – Hibernian, Hamilton Academical – 2004–08, 2009
- Roger Boli – Dundee United – 1998–99
- Stéphane Bonnes – Partick Thistle – 2003–04
- Jérôme Bonnissel – Rangers – 2002–03
- Bertrand Bossu – Aberdeen – 2008–09
- Jean-Alain Boumsong – Rangers – 2004–05
- Samuel Boutal – Kilmarnock – 2002–03
- Julien Brellier – Heart of Midlothian – 2005–07
- Philippe Brinquin – Livingston – 2001–03
- Mickaël Buscher – Gretna – 2007–08
- Lionel Charbonnier – Rangers – 1998–2000
- Jérémy Clément – Rangers – 2006–07
- Christophe Cocard – Kilmarnock – 1999–2002
- Aurélien Collin – Gretna – 2007–08
- Moussa Dagnogo – St Mirren – 2000–01
- Frédéric Daquin – Hibernian, Dunfermline Athletic – 2001–03, 2005–07
- Jean-Claude Darcheville – Rangers – 2007–09
- Jean-Pierre Delaunay – Dundee United – 1999–2000
- Eric Deloumeaux – Motherwell, Aberdeen, Livingston – 2001–05
- Frédéric Dindeleux – Kilmarnock – 1999–2005
- Alex Di Rocco – Aberdeen – 2000–01
- Lionel Djebi-Zadi – Inverness CT – 2008–10
- Emmanuel Dorado – Livingston – 2002–06
- François Dubourdeau – Motherwell, Kilmarnock – 2001–04
- Stephen Ettien – Hamilton Academical – 2008–09
- Nicolas Fabiano – Aberdeen – 2002–03
- Fabrice Fernandes – Rangers – 2000–01
- David Ferrère – Motherwell – 2002
- Marc-Antoine Fortuné – Celtic – 2009–10
- Éric Garcin – Dundee – 1998–99
- Kenny Gillet – Inverness CT – 2010–12
- Claude Gnakpa – Inverness CT – 2012
- David Grondin – Dunfermline Athletic – 2002–04
- Vincent Guérin – Heart of Midlothian – 1998–99
- Stéphane Guivarc'h – Rangers – 1998–99
- Fabrice Henry – Hibernian – 1999–2000
- Eric Joly – Kilmarnock – 2004–05
- Olivier Kapo – Celtic – 2010–11
- Mathias Kouo-Doumbé – Hibernian – 2001–04
- Fabien Leclercq – Heart of Midlothian – 1999–2000
- Stéphane Léoni – Dundee United – 2000–01
- John Licina – Dundee United – 2000–01
- Lionel Letizi – Rangers – 2006–07
- Marc Libbra – Hibernian, Livingston – 2000–01, 2004–05
- Stéphane Mahé – Celtic, Heart of Midlothian – 1998–2003
- Lilian Martin – Hibernian – 2002–03
- Youl Mawéné – Aberdeen – 2011–12
- Yassin Moutaouakil – Motherwell – 2009–10
- Christian Nadé – Heart of Midlothian – 2007–10
- Patrick Noubissie – Hibernian – 2007–08
- Pascal Nouma – Livingston – 2004–05
- Bernard Pascual – Dundee United – 1998–2000
- José-Karl Pierre-Fanfan – Rangers – 2005–06
- Steve Pinau – Hibernian – 2008–09
- Mickaël Pizzo – Kilmarnock – 2001–02
- Stéphane Pounewatchy – Dundee – 1998–99
- Antoine Préget – Dundee United – 1999–2000
- Damien Rascle – Kilmarnock – 2008–09
- Julien Rodriguez – Rangers – 2005–07
- Jérôme Rothen – Rangers – 2009–10
- Gilles Rousset – Heart of Midlothian – 1998–2001
- Ludovic Roy – St Mirren, St Johnstone, Livingston – 2000–02, 2005–06
- Didier Santini – Livingston – 2001–02
- Hakim Sar-Temsoury – Hibernian – 2000–01
- Franck Sauzée – Hibernian – 1999–2002
- Mohamadou Sissoko – Kilmarnock – 2010–13
- Eric Skora – Kilmarnock – 2003–04, 2007–08
- Yann Soloy – Motherwell – 2001–02
- Grégory Tadé – Inverness CT, St Johnstone – 2011–2013
- Steven Thicot – Hibernian – 2008–2011
- Joël Thomas – Hamilton Academical – 2008–09
- Cédric Uras – Falkirk – 2006–07
- Jean-Louis Valois – Heart of Midlothian – 2002–04
- Jérôme Vareille – Kilmarnock – 1998–2002
- Grégory Vignal – Rangers – 2004–05
- Yannick Zambernardi – Hibernian, Dunfermline Athletic – 2002–04, 2005–06
- David Zitelli – Hibernian – 2000–02

== Gabon ==
- Willy Aubameyang – Kilmarnock – 2011–12
- Daniel Cousin – Rangers – 2007–09

== The Gambia ==
- Pa Saikou Kujabi – Hibernian – 2012–13

== Georgia ==
- Shota Arveladze – Rangers – 2001–05
- Temuri Ketsbaia – Dundee – 2001–02
- Zurab Khizanishvili – Dundee, Rangers – 2000–05
- Georgi Nemsadze – Dundee – 2000–04

== Germany ==
- Jörg Albertz – Rangers – 1998–2001
- Andreas Hinkel – Celtic – 2008–11
- Mathias Jack – Hibernian – 1999–2003
- Torben Joneleit – Hibernian – 2007–08
- Stefan Klos – Rangers – 1998–2006
- Sebastian Kneißl – Dundee – 2003–04
- Dirk Lehmann – Hibernian; Motherwell – 1999–2001; 2002–03
- Andreas Mayer – Aberdeen – 1998–2001
- Christian Nerlinger – Rangers – 2001–04
- Jens Paeslack – St Mirren – 2000–01
- Denis Prychynenko – Heart of Midlothian – 2012–13
- Daniel Sengewald – Motherwell – 2002–03
- Andis Shala – Dundee United – 2008–2011
- Steffen Wohlfarth – Ross County – 2013

== Ghana ==
- Junior Agogo – Hibernian – 2011–2012
- Derek Asamoah – Hamilton Academical – 2009
- Prince Buaben – Dundee United, Partick Thistle – 2007–2011, 2013–2014
- Francis Dickoh – Hibernian – 2010–2011
- Laryea Kingston – Heart of Midlothian – 2006–2010

== Greece ==
- Takis Fyssas – Heart of Midlothian – 2005–07
- Evangelos Ikonomou – Ross County – 2013–2014
- Hristos Karipidis – Heart of Midlothian – 2006–09
- Sotirios Kyrgiakos – Rangers – 2004–06
- Georgios Samaras – Celtic – 2007–2014
- Tassos Venetis – Dundee United – 1999–2003

== Guinea ==
- Bobo Baldé – Celtic – 2001–09
- Mohammed Camara – Celtic, St Mirren – 2005–06, 2009–2010
- Mohammed Sylla – St Johnstone, Celtic, Kilmarnock – 2000–05, 2006–07

== Guinea-Bissau ==
- Esmaël Gonçalves – St Mirren – 2013

== Haiti ==
- Lecsinel Jean-François – Falkirk – 2005–07
- Abel Thermeus – Motherwell – 2006

== Honduras ==
- Jorge Claros – Hibernian – 2012–13
- Emilio Izaguirre – Celtic – 2010–13
- Francisco Ramírez – Dundee United – 2000–01

== Hungary ==
- János Balogh – Heart of Midlothian – 2008–2011
- Ferenc Horváth – Livingston – 2004–05
- Attila Kriston – Livingston – 2004–05
- János Mátyus – Hibernian – 2002–03
- Dénes Rósa – Hibernian – 2009
- Thomas Sowunmi – Hibernian – 2006–07
- Krisztián Vadócz – Motherwell – 2007
- Gábor Vincze – Livingston – 2005–06

== Iceland ==
- Kári Árnason – Aberdeen 2011–2012
- Baldur Bett – Aberdeen – 1998–2000
- Calum Bett – Aberdeen – 2000–02
- Teddy Bjarnason – Celtic – 2006–07
- Kjartan Finnbogason – Falkirk – 2009–10
- Ólafur Gottskálksson – Hibernian – 1998–2000
- Arnar Gunnlaugsson – Dundee United – 2003–04
- Garðar Gunnlaugsson – Dunfermline Athletic – 2006
- Eggert Jónsson – Heart of Midlothian – 2006–12
- Siggi Jónsson – Dundee United – 1998–2000
- Þórarinn Kristjánsson – Aberdeen – 2004–05
- Victor Palsson – Hibernian – 2011–12
- Hjálmar Þórarinsson – Heart of Midlothian – 2004–06
- Johannes Edvaldsson – Celtic – 1975–1980

== Israel ==
- Eyal Berkovic – Celtic – 1999–2000
- Gil Blumstein – Inverness CT – 2010–11
- Rami Gershon – Celtic – 2013
- Beram Kayal – Celtic – 2010–13
- Jan Talesnikov – Dundee United – 1999–2000

== Italy ==
- Enrico Annoni – Celtic – 1998–99
- Lorenzo Amoruso – Rangers – 1997–2003
- Massimo Beghetto – Dundee – 2001–02
- Patrizio Billio – Dundee, Aberdeen – 1999–2001, 2002–03
- Ivano Bonetti – Dundee – 2000–01
- Massimiliano Caputo – Livingston – 2001–02
- Daniele Chiarini – Dundee United, Partick Thistle – 2002–04
- Marco De Marchi – Dundee – 2000–01
- Simone Del Nero – Livingston – 2001–02
- Paolo Di Canio – Celtic – 1996–98
- Massimo Donati – Celtic – 2007–09
- Gennaro Gattuso – Rangers – 1998–99
- Davide Grassi – Aberdeen, Dundee – 2009–2010, 2012–2013
- Marcello Marrocco – Dundee – 2000–03
- Marco Negri – Rangers – 1998–2001
- Manuel Pascali – Kilmarnock – 2008–13
- Sergio Porrini – Rangers – 1998–2001
- Fabrizio Ravanelli – Dundee – 2003–04
- Luigi Riccio – Rangers – 1998–99
- Marco Roccati – Dundee – 2000–01
- Alessandro Romano – Dundee – 2000–02
- Marco Russo – Dundee – 2000–01
- Stefano Salvatori – Heart of Midlothian – 1998–99
- Mauro Vargiu – Dundee – 2000–01
- Paolo Vanoli – Rangers – 2003–05

== Jamaica ==
- Omar Daley – Motherwell – 2011–13
- Ricardo Fuller – Heart of Midlothian – 2001–02
- Simon Ford – Kilmarnock – 2004–2010
- Marcus Gayle – Rangers – 2000
- Chris Humphrey – Motherwell – 2009–13
- Fitzroy Simpson – Heart of Midlothian – 1999–2001
- Cleveland Taylor – St Johnstone – 2010–11
- Theodore Whitmore – Livingston – 2003–04

== Japan ==
- Koki Mizuno – Celtic – 2008–10
- Shunsuke Nakamura – Celtic – 2005–09

== Kenya ==
- Victor Wanyama – Celtic – 2011–2013

== Latvia ==
- Pavels Mihadjuks – Inverness CT – 2008–09

== Liberia ==
- Christopher Wreh – St Mirren – 2001–02

== Lithuania ==
- Nerijus Barasa – Heart of Midlothian – 2005–07
- Ričardas Beniušis – Heart of Midlothian – 2007–08
- Deividas Česnauskis – Heart of Midlothian – 2004–09
- Marius Činikas – Heart of Midlothian – 2009–2010
- Tomas Danilevičius – Dunfermline Athletic – 2000–01
- Kęstutis Ivaškevičius – Heart of Midlothian – 2006–08
- Edgaras Jankauskas – Heart of Midlothian – 2005–07
- Tomas Kančelskis – Heart of Midlothian – 2006–08
- Marius Kižys – Heart of Midlothian – 2005
- Audrius Kšanavičius – Heart of Midlothian – 2007–09
- Eduardas Kurskis – Heart of Midlothian – 2007–08
- Saulius Mikoliūnas – Heart of Midlothian – 2005–09
- Arvydas Novikovas – Heart of Midlothian – 2009–13
- Linas Pilibaitis – Heart of Midlothian – 2006–07
- Andrius Skerla – Dunfermline Athletic – 2000–05
- Valdas Trakys – Hibernian – 2010–2011
- Andrius Velička – Heart of Midlothian; Rangers; Aberdeen – 2006–11
- Marius Žaliūkas – Heart of Midlothian – 2006–2013

== Madagascar ==
- William Gros – Kilmarnock – 2010–2014

== Mali ==
- Amadou Konte – Hibernian – 2004–07
- Mohamadou Sissoko – Kilmarnock – 2010–2011

== Mexico ==
- Efrain Juárez – Celtic – 2010–2012

== Montenegro ==
- Nikola Vujadinović – Aberdeen – 2010–2011

== Montserrat ==
- Junior Mendes – Dunfermline Athletic – 2000–02

== Morocco ==
- Rachid Belabed – Aberdeen – 1999–2002
- Abdessalam Benjelloun – Hibernian – 2005–2010
- Saïd Chiba – Motherwell – 2000–01
- Ilias Haddad – St Mirren – 2011–12
- Hassan Kachloul – Livingston – 2004–05
- Badr El Kaddouri – Celtic – 2011–12
- Youssef Rossi – Dunfermline Athletic – 2000–02
- Mehdi Taouil – Kilmarnock, Hearts – 2007–13
- Merouane Zemmama – Hibernian – 2006–2011
- Hicham Zerouali – Aberdeen – 1999–2002

== Namibia ==
- Eliphas Shivute – Motherwell – 1998–99
- Quinton Jacobs – Partick Thistle – 1999–2000

== Netherlands ==
- Gerard Aafjes – Falkirk – 2007–09
- Ivo den Bieman – Dunfermline Athletic – 1998–99
- Regi Blinker – Celtic – 1998–2000
- Frank de Boer – Rangers – 2003–04
- Ronald de Boer – Rangers – 2000–04
- Edson Braafheid – Celtic – 2010
- Giovanni van Bronckhorst – Rangers – 1998–2001
- Danny Buijs – Kilmarnock – 2011–2012
- Dave Bus – Aberdeen – 2007–08
- Marinus Dijkhuizen – Dunfermline Athletic – 2000–01
- Sieb Dijkstra – Motherwell, Dundee United −1991-94, 1998–99
- Michel Doesburg – Motherwell, Dunfermline Athletic – 1998–2002
- Frank van Eijs – Dundee – 1999–2000
- Jack de Gier – Dunfermline Athletic – 2001–02
- Edwin de Graaf – Hibernian – 2010–11
- Nigel Hasselbaink – Hamilton Academical, St Mirren, St Johnstone – 2010–2013
- Jos Hooiveld – Celtic – 2010–11
- André Karnebeek – Dunfermline Athletic – 2001–03
- Benito Kemble – Motherwell, St Johnstone – 1999–2002
- Bert Konterman – Rangers – 2000–03
- Tim Krul – Falkirk – 2007–08
- Jeroen Lambers – Falkirk – 2006–07
- Glenn Loovens – Celtic – 2008–12
- Rob Matthaei – Motherwell, Dunfermline Athletic – 1998–2001
- Timothy van der Meulen – Dundee Utd – 2011
- Jan Michels – Motherwell – 1998–99
- Michael Mols – Rangers – 1999–2004
- Arthur Numan – Rangers – 1998–2003
- Bobby Petta – Celtic – 1999–2005
- Maikel Renfurm – St Mirren – 2000–01
- Fernando Ricksen – Rangers – 2000–06
- Humphrey Rudge – Hibernian – 2005–06
- Marco Ruitenbeek – Dunfermline Athletic – 2000–04
- Evander Sno – Celtic – 2006–08
- Ferne Snoyl – Aberdeen – 2005–06
- Jeroen Tesselaar – St Mirren, Kilmarnock – 2011–13
- Karim Touzani – Aberdeen – 2006–08
- Pierre Van Hooijdonk – Celtic – 1995–97
- Jan Vennegoor of Hesselink – Celtic – 2006–09
- Jeffrey de Visscher – Aberdeen – 2007–09
- Dorus de Vries – Dunfermline Athletic – 2006–07
- Mark de Vries – Heart of Midlothian, Dundee United – 2002–08
- Ronald Waterreus – Rangers – 2005–06

== Netherlands Antilles ==
- Dyron Daal – Aberdeen – 2006–07
- Shelton Martis – Hibernian – 2006–07

== New Zealand ==
- Rory Fallon – Aberdeen, St Johnstone – 2011–13
- Chris Killen – Hibernian, Celtic – 2005–10
- Michael McGlinchey – Celtic, Motherwell – 2005–06, 2010
- Steven Old – Kilmarnock – 2009–11

== Nigeria ==
- Sone Aluko – Aberdeen, Rangers – 2007–12
- Efe Ambrose – Celtic – 2012–13
- Rabiu Ibrahim – Celtic, Kilmarnock – 2012–13
- Henry Makinwa – Gretna – 2007–08
- James Okoli – Motherwell – 2000–01
- Danny Uchechi – Aberdeen – 2012

== Norway ==
- Thomas Kind Bendiksen – Rangers – 2007–12
- Henning Berg – Rangers – 2003–04
- Harald Brattbakk – Celtic – 1997–2000
- Tore André Flo – Rangers – 2000–02
- Cato Guntveit – Aberdeen – 1999–01
- Christian Kalvenes – Dundee United – 2006–08
- Glenn Atle Larsen – Dundee – 2004–05
- Thomas Myhre – Rangers – 1999
- Egil Østenstad – Rangers – 2003–04
- Erik Pedersen – Dundee United – 1998–99
- Vidar Riseth – Celtic – 1998–2000
- Thomas Rogne – Celtic – 2010–13
- Thomas Solberg – Aberdeen – 1999–2002
- Arild Stavrum – Aberdeen – 1999–2001
- Ståle Stensaas – Rangers – 1998–2000

== North Macedonia ==
- David Babunski - Dundee United - 2024-
- Bajram Fetai – Rangers, Inverness CT – 2003–05
- Georgi Hristov – Dunfermline Athletic – 2004–05
- Goran Stanić – Livingston – 2004–05

== Peru ==
- José Valeriani – Dundee United – 1998–99

== Poland ==
- Dariusz Adamczuk – Dundee, Rangers – 1998–2001
- Artur Boruc – Celtic – 2005–10
- Paweł Brożek – Celtic – 2012
- Radosław Cierzniak – Dundee United – 2012–13
- Arkadiusz Klimek – Heart of Midlothian – 2006–07
- Artur Krysiak – Gretna, Motherwell – 2007–09
- Dawid Kucharski – Heart of Midlothian – 2009–2011
- Zbigniew Małkowski – Hibernian, Inverness CT – 2005–08
- Adrian Mrowiec – Heart of Midlothian – 2008–09, 2010–2012
- Grzegorz Szamotulski – Dundee United, Hibernian – 2007–09
- Bartosz Tarachulski – Dunfermline Athletic – 2005–06
- Łukasz Załuska – Dundee United, Celtic – 2007–13
- Maciej Żurawski – Celtic – 2005–08

== Portugal ==
- Bruno Aguiar – Heart of Midlothian – 2005–09
- Jorge Cadete – Partick Thistle – 2004
- Nuno Capucho – Rangers – 2003–04
- Tiago Costa – Heart of Midlothian – 2006
- José Gonçalves – Heart of Midlothian – 2005–10
- Vítor Lima – Falkirk – 2005–07, 2009–2010
- Pedro Mendes – Rangers – 2008–10
- Rui Miguel – Kilmarnock – 2010–11
- Filipe Morais – Hibernian, Inverness CT, St Johnstone – 2007–10
- Pedro Moutinho – Falkirk – 2004–10
- Flávio Paixão – Hamilton – 2009–11
- Marco Paixão – Hamilton – 2009–11
- Quim – Dundee United – 1999–2000
- David Silva – Kilmarnock – 2010–2012
- Miguel Simão – St Johnstone – 1998–2000
- Tiago – Falkirk – 2005–06
- Ricardo Vaz Tê – Hibernian – 2011

== Romania ==
- Dorin Goian – Rangers – 2011–12
- Marius Niculae – Inverness CT – 2007–08

== Russia ==
- Andrei Kanchelskis – Rangers – 1998–2002
- Dmitri Kharine – Celtic – 1999–2002

== Saint Lucia ==
- Earl Jean – Hibernian – 1999–2000

== Senegal ==
- Henri Camara – Celtic – 2004–05
- El Hadji Diouf – Rangers – 2011
- Amdy Faye – Rangers – 2007–08
- Joachim Fernandez – Dundee United – 2000–01
- Morgaro Gomis – Dundee United – 2007–11
- Diomansy Kamara – Celtic – 2010
- Makhtar N'Diaye – Rangers – 2006–07
- Seyni N'Diaye – Dunfermline Athletic – 2002–03
- Ibrahim Tall – Heart of Midlothian – 2005–08

== Serbia ==
- Saša Ćurčić – Motherwell – 1999–2000
- Dragan Mladenović – Rangers – 2004–05
- Gordan Petrić – Rangers, Heart of Midlothian – 1998–99, 1999–2001

== Sierra Leone ==
- Mohamed Bangura – Celtic – 2011–2013

== Slovakia ==
- Miloš Lačný – Dundee United – 2012–13
- Ľubomír Moravčík – Celtic – 1998–2002
- Martin Petráš – Heart of Midlothian – 2005–06
- Marián Kello – Heart of Midlothian, St Mirren – 2008–12, 2013
- Maroš Klimpl – Motherwell – 2008–09
- Filip Mentel – Dundee United – 2010–13
- Dušan Perniš – Dundee United – 2010–12
- Filip Šebo – Rangers – 2006–07
- Róbert Tomaschek – Heart of Midlothian – 1999–2002
- Stanislav Varga – Celtic – 2002–06
- Vladimir Weiss – Rangers – 2010–11

== Slovenia ==
- Danijel Marčeta – Falkirk – 2009–2010
- Leon Panikvar – Kilmarnock – 2011–12
- Jure Travner – St Mirren – 2010–2011

== South Africa ==
- Dean Furman – Rangers – 2007–08
- Chad Harpur – Kilmarnock – 2007–08

== South Korea ==
- Cha Du-Ri – Celtic – 2010–2012
- Ki Sung-Yueng – Celtic – 2010–12

== Spain ==
- Guillermo Amor – Livingston – 2002–03
- Javier Artero – Dundee – 2000–02
- Mikel Arteta – Rangers – 2002–04
- Quino Cabrera – Livingston – 2001–04
- Antonio Calderón – Kilmarnock – 2000–02
- Juanjo Camacho – Livingston – 2002–04
- Salvador Capín – Livingston – 2003–04
- Esteban Casagolda – Motherwell – 2010–11
- Marc Crosas – Celtic – 2008–11
- Carlos Cuéllar – Rangers – 2007–08
- David Fernández – Livingston, Celtic, Dundee United, Kilmarnock – 2001–2010
- Jorge Galán – Kilmarnock – 2011–12
- Jesús García Sanjuán – Kilmarnock – 2001–03
- Roman Golobart – Inverness CT – 2011–12
- Juanjo – Heart of Midlothian, Inverness CT – 1998–2002, 2004–06
- Paco Luna – Dundee, Hibernian – 2000, 2001–03
- Dani Mallo – Falkirk – 2009
- Roberto Martínez – Motherwell – 2001–02
- Roberto Matute – Dundee – 1999–2000
- Aarón Ñíguez – Rangers – 2008–09
- Nacho Novo – Dundee, Rangers – 2002–10
- Juan Manuel Ortiz – Rangers – 2011–12
- Rubén Palazuelos – Heart of Midlothian – 2007–11
- Ramón Pereira – Heart of Midlothian, Livingston – 2004–06
- Borja Pérez – Kilmarnock – 2012–13
- Antonio Reguero – Inverness CT, Kilmarnock, Ross County, Hibernian – 2012–2016
- Arnau Riera – Falkirk – 2007–2009
- Luis Rubiales – Hamilton Academical – 2009
- Rubio – Livingston – 2001–05
- Dani Sanchez – Inverness CT 2010–11
- Francisco Sandaza – Dundee United, St Johnstone – 2008–2010, 2011–12
- Javier Sánchez Broto – Livingston, Celtic – 2001–03
- Suso Santana – Heart of Midlothian – 2009–12
- Tonet – St Mirren – 2008–09
- Kiko Torres – Dundee – 2001–02

== Sweden ==
- Daniel Andersson – Hibernian – 2002–04
- Billy Berntsson – Kilmarnock – 2011–12
- Bojan Djordjic – Rangers – 2004–05
- Mervan Çelik – Rangers – 2012
- Magnus Hedman – Celtic – 2002–05
- Henrik Larsson – Celtic – 1998–2004
- Freddie Ljungberg – Celtic – 2011
- Mikael Lustig – Celtic – 2012–13
- Daniel Majstorović – Celtic – 2010–12
- Johan Mjällby – Celtic – 1998–2004
- Kjell Olofsson – Dundee United – 1998–99
- Erik Schultz-Eklund – Gretna – 2007–08
- Magnus Sköldmark – Dundee United – 1998–2000
- Karl Svensson – Rangers – 2006–07
- Jonas Thern – Rangers – 1998–99
- Marcus Törnstrand – Dundee United – 2013
- Lars Zetterlund – Dundee United – 1998–99

== Switzerland ==
- Stéphane Henchoz – Celtic – 2004–05
- Oumar Kondé – Hibernian – 2006–07
- Mihael Kovačević – Dundee United, Ross County – 2008–11, 2012–13
- Ramon Vega – Celtic – 2000–01

== Togo ==
- Yoann Folly – Aberdeen – 2010–12
- Mamam Cherif Touré – Livingston – 2001–04

== Trinidad and Tobago ==
- Lyndon Andrews – Hibernian – 2000–02
- Marvin Andrews – Livingston, Rangers, Hamilton Academical – 2000–06, 2009–10
- Chris Birchall – St Mirren – 2007
- Kelvin Jack – Dundee – 2004–05
- Russell Latapy – Hibernian, Rangers, Dundee United, Falkirk – 1999–2009
- Brent Rahim – Falkirk – 2003–2005
- Collin Samuel – Falkirk, Dundee United, St Johnstone – 2002–2011
- Brent Sancho – Dundee – 2003–05
- Jason Scotland – Dundee United – 2003–05
- Tony Warner – Celtic, Aberdeen – 1998–99

== Tunisia ==
- Hamed Namouchi – Rangers – 2003–06
- Lassad Nouioui – Celtic – 2012–13

== Turkey ==
- Tugay Kerimoğlu – Rangers – 1999–2001

== Uganda ==
- David Obua – Heart of Midlothian – 2008–12

== United States ==
- DaMarcus Beasley – Rangers – 2007–10
- Alejandro Bedoya – Rangers – 2011–12
- Carlos Bocanegra – Rangers – 2011–12
- Dominic Cervi – Celtic – 2008–12
- Maurice Edu – Rangers – 2008–12
- Claudio Reyna – Rangers – 1998–02

== Uruguay ==
- Carlos Marcora – Dundee United – 2000–01
- Gerardo Traverso – Dundee – 2001–02
- Fabián Yantorno – Gretna, Hibernian – 2007–09

== Venezuela ==
- Jonay Hernandez – Dundee – 2002–04
- Fernando de Ornelas – Celtic – 1999–2000
- Miku – Celtic – 2012–13
