= 2000–01 Motherwell F.C. season =

Motherwell
2000–01 season
- Chairman: John Boyle
- Manager: Billy Davies
- Premier League: 8th
- Scottish Cup: Fourth round vs Dundee United
- League Cup: Third round vs Dunfermline Athletic
- Top goalscorer: League: Stuart Elliott (12); All: Stuart Elliott (12)
Home colours

The 2000–01 season was Motherwell's 3rd season in the Scottish Premier League, and their 16th consecutive season in the top division of Scottish football.

== Season review ==
In February, Ged Brannan joined Wigan Athletic and John Spencer was sold to Colorado Rapids.

On 2 March, Steve McMillan and Lee McCulloch both joined Wigan Athletic for a combined £1.25m.

On 16 March, Saïd Chiba joined Motherwell on loan from AS Nancy until the end of the season, whilst James Okoli joined from Watford on a contract also until the end of the season.

On 22 March, goalkeeper Andy Goram was loaned to Manchester United, for £100k, until the end of the season, and Don Goodman left on a free-transfer to sign for Walsall.

== Squad ==
As of match played 20 May 2001

| No. | Name | Nationality | Position | Date of birth (age) | Signed from | Signed in | Contract ends | Apps. | Goals |
Goalkeepers
| 17 | Stevie Woods | (Scotland) | GK | 23 February 1970 (aged 31) | Preston North End | 1994 | | | |
| 25 | Jon Connolly | (Scotland) | GK | 3 April 1981 (aged 20) | Thorniewood United | 2000 | | 2 | 0 |
Defenders
| 2 | Martyn Corrigan | (Scotland) | DF | 14 August 1977 (aged 23) | Falkirk | 2000 | | 59 | 1 |
| 4 | Benito Kemble | (Suriname) | DF | 27 August 1968 (aged 32) | N.E.C. | 1999 | | 53 | 1 |
| 5 | James Okoli | (Nigeria) | DF | 11 January 1976 (aged 25) | Watford | 2001 | 2001 | 5 | 0 |
| 6 | Greg Strong | (England) | DF | 5 September 1975 (aged 25) | Bolton Wanderers | 2000 | | 44 | 2 |
| 15 | Tony Thomas | (England) | DF | 12 July 1971 (aged 29) | Everton | 1999 | | 20 | 1 |
| 16 | Steven Hammell | (Scotland) | DF | 18 February 1982 (aged 19) | Youth team | 1999 | | 42 | 0 |
| 23 | Ange Oueifio | (Central African Republic) | DF | 29 March 1976 (aged 25) | Denderleeuw EH | 2000 | | 20 | 0 |
| 28 | Brian Dempsie | (Scotland) | DF | 4 February 1983 (aged 18) | Youth team | 1999 | | 1 | 0 |
| 30 | Scott Wilson | (Scotland) | DF | 20 April 1982 (aged 19) | Youth team | 2000 | | 0 | 0 |
| 34 | John Constable | (Scotland) | DF | 4 October 1984 (aged 16) | Youth team | 1999 | | 0 | 0 |
| 36 | William Kinniburgh | (Scotland) | DF | 8 September 1984 (aged 16) | Youth team | 2000 | | 0 | 0 |
| 37 | John Crawley | (Scotland) | DF | 20 March 1984 (aged 17) | Youth team | 1999 | | 0 | 0 |
Midfielders
| 8 | John Davies | (Scotland) | MF | 25 September 1966 (aged 34) | Ayr United | 1999 | | 14 | 0 |
| 12 | Derek Adams | (Scotland) | MF | 25 June 1975 (aged 25) | Ross County | 1998 | | 75 | 7 |
| 18 | Derek Townsley | (England) | MF | 21 January 1973 (aged 28) | Queen of the South | 1999 | | 65 | 7 |
| 19 | Stuart Elliott | (Northern Ireland) | MF | 23 July 1978 (aged 22) | Glentoran | 2000 | | 36 | 12 |
| 20 | Dougie Ramsay | (Scotland) | MF | 26 April 1979 (aged 22) | Youth team | 1997 | | 16 | 1 |
| 21 | Paul Harvey | (Scotland) | MF | 28 August 1968 (aged 32) | Queen of the South | 1999 | | 26 | 1 |
| 22 | Keith Lasley | (Scotland) | MF | 21 September 1979 (aged 21) | Youth team | 1999 | | 13 | 1 |
| 26 | Colin Miller | (Scotland) | MF | | Youth team | 1999 | | 0 | 0 |
| 29 | David Clarke | (Scotland) | MF | 22 June 1983 (aged 17) | Youth team | 1999 | | 0 | 0 |
| 31 | Kevin MacDonald | (Scotland) | MF | 5 February 1983 (aged 18) | Youth team | 1999 | | 0 | 0 |
| 33 | John Constable | (Scotland) | MF | 1 December 1981 (aged 19) | Youth team | 1999 | | 0 | 0 |
| 35 | Shaun Fagan | (Scotland) | MF | 22 March 1984 (aged 17) | Youth team | 1999 | | 0 | 0 |
| 38 | Barry Tulloch | (Scotland) | MF | 30 January 1984 (aged 17) | Youth team | 2000 | | 0 | 0 |
| 39 | Liam Fleming | (Scotland) | MF | | Youth team | 2000 | | 0 | 0 |
| 40 | Billy Brawley | (Scotland) | MF | 19 March 1984 (aged 17) | Youth team | 1999 | | 0 | 0 |
| 41 | Stephen Pearson | (Scotland) | MF | 2 October 1982 (aged 18) | Youth team | 2000 | | 6 | 0 |
| 43 | Scott Leitch | (Scotland) | MF | 6 October 1969 (aged 31) | Swindon Town | 2000 | | 29 | 0 |
| | Saïd Chiba | (Morocco) | MF | 28 September 1970 (aged 30) | loan from AS Nancy | 2001 | 2001 | 7 | 0 |
Forwards
| 11 | Stevie Nicholas | (Scotland) | FW | 8 July 1981 (aged 19) | Stirling Albion | 1999 | | 50 | 3 |
| 14 | Kevin Twaddle | (Scotland) | FW | 31 October 1971 (aged 29) | Greenock Morton | 1999 | | 55 | 7 |
| 24 | Martin Wood | (Scotland) | FW | 20 August 1982 (aged 18) | Rothes | 1999 | | 9 | 0 |
| 27 | James McFadden | (Scotland) | FW | 14 April 1983 (aged 18) | Youth team | 2000 | | 7 | 0 |
| 32 | John Fallon | (Scotland) | FW | 14 January 1982 (aged 19) | Youth team | 1999 | | 0 | 0 |
Out on loan
| 1 | Andy Goram | (Scotland) | GK | 13 April 1964 (aged 37) | Sheffield United | 1998 | | 70 | 0 |
Left during the season
| 3 | Steve McMillan | (Scotland) | DF | 19 January 1976 (aged 25) | Troon | 1993 | | | |
| 5 | Ged Brannan | (England) | MF | 15 January 1972 (aged 29) | Manchester City | 1998 | | 93 | 18 |
| 7 | John Spencer | (Scotland) | FW | 11 September 1970 (aged 30) | Everton | 1999 | | 82 | 21 |
| 9 | Lee McCulloch | (Scotland) | MF | 14 May 1978 (aged 23) | Youth team | 1995 | | | |
| 10 | Don Goodman | (England) | FW | 9 May 1966 (aged 35) | Sanfrecce Hiroshima | 1999 | | 64 | 12 |
| 44 | Jamie McClen | (England) | MF | 13 May 1979 (aged 22) | loan from Newcastle United | 2000 | | 3 | 0 |

=== Out on loan ===
Note: Flags indicate national team as defined under FIFA eligibility rules; some limited exceptions apply. Players may hold more than one non-FIFA nationality.

| No. / Pos. / Nation / Player; 1 / GK / SCO / Andy Goram (at Manchester United) | No. / Pos. / Nation / Player |

== Transfers ==
=== In ===
| Date | Position | Nationality | Name | From | Fee | Ref. |
|---|---|---|---|---|---|---|
| Summer 2000 | GK | (Scotland) | Jon Connolly | Thorniewood United | Undisclosed | |
| Summer 2000 | DF | (England) | Greg Strong | Bolton Wanderers | Undisclosed | |
| Summer 2000 | DF | (Central African Republic) | Ange Oueifio | Denderleeuw EH | Undisclosed | |
| Summer 2000 | MF | (Northern Ireland) | Stuart Elliott | Glentoran | Undisclosed | |
| Summer 2000 | MF | (Scotland) | Scott Leitch | Swindon Town | Undisclosed | |
| 16 March 2001 | DF | (Nigeria) | James Okoli | Watford | Free | |

=== Loans in ===
| Date from | Position | Nationality | Name | From | Date to | Ref. |
|---|---|---|---|---|---|---|
| 1 October 2000 | MF | (England) | Jamie McClen | Newcastle United | 31 December 2000 | |
| 16 March 2001 | MF | (Morocco) | Saïd Chiba | AS Nancy | End of season | |

=== Out ===
| Date | Position | Nationality | Name | To | Fee | Ref. |
|---|---|---|---|---|---|---|
| February 2001 | MF | (England) | Ged Brannan | Wigan Athletic | Undisclosed | |
| 21 February 2001 | FW | (Scotland) | John Spencer | Colorado Rapids | Undisclosed | |
| 2 March 2001 | DF | (Scotland) | Steve McMillan | Wigan Athletic | £550,000 | |
| 2 March 2001 | MF | (Scotland) | Lee McCulloch | Wigan Athletic | £700,000 | |
| 22 March 2001 | FW | (England) | Don Goodman | Walsall | Free | |

=== Loans out ===
| Date from | Position | Nationality | Name | To | Date to | Ref. |
|---|---|---|---|---|---|---|
| 22 March 2001 | GK | (Scotland) | Andy Goram | Manchester United | End of Season | |

=== Released ===
| Date | Position | Nationality | Name | Joined | Date | Ref. |
|---|---|---|---|---|---|---|
| 31 May 2001 | GK | (Scotland) | Andy Goram | Coventry City | 24 August 2001 | |
| 31 May 2001 | DF | (Nigeria) | James Okoli | York City | | |
| 31 May 2001 | DF | (Suriname) | Benito Kemble | St Johnstone | 27 July 2001 | |
| 31 May 2001 | MF | (England) | Derek Townsley | Hibernian | 9 July 2001 | |
| 31 May 2001 | MF | (Morocco) | Saïd Chiba | Aris Thessaloniki | | |

== Competitions ==
=== Premier League ===
==== League table ====
| Pos | Team | Pld | W | D | L | GF | GA | GD | Pts | Qualification or relegation (Note: Teams played each other three times (33 matches), before the league split into two groups (the top six and the bottom six) for the last five matches.) |
|---|---|---|---|---|---|---|---|---|---|---|
| 6 | Dundee | 38 | 13 | 8 | 17 | 51 | 49 | +2 | 47 | Qualification for the UEFA Intertoto Cup first round (Note: Dundee qualified for the 2001 UEFA Intertoto Cup as the highest-placed team to apply for a place in the competition.) |
| 7 | Aberdeen | 38 | 11 | 12 | 15 | 45 | 52 | −7 | 45 | |
| 8 | Motherwell | 38 | 12 | 7 | 19 | 42 | 56 | −14 | 43 | |
| 9 | Dunfermline Athletic | 38 | 11 | 9 | 18 | 34 | 54 | −20 | 42 | |
| 10 | St Johnstone | 38 | 9 | 13 | 16 | 40 | 56 | −16 | 40 | |

Source: Scottish Professional Football League
Rules for classification: 1) Points; 2) Goal difference; 3) Goals scored

==== Results summary ====
| Overall | | | | | | | | Home | | | | | | Away | | | | | |
| Pld | W | D | L | GF | GA | GD | Pts | W | D | L | GF | GA | GD | W | D | L | GF | GA | GD |
|---|---|---|---|---|---|---|---|---|---|---|---|---|---|---|---|---|---|---|---|
| 38 | 12 | 7 | 19 | 42 | 56 | −14 | 43 | 5 | 4 | 10 | 22 | 27 | −5 | 7 | 3 | 9 | 20 | 29 | −9 |

Source: See Results

==== Results by matchday ====
| Round | 1 | 2 | 3 | 4 | 5 | 6 | 7 | 8 | 9 | 10 | 11 | 12 | 13 | 14 | 15 | 16 | 17 | 18 | 19 | 20 | 21 | 22 | 23 | 24 | 25 | 26 | 27 | 28 | 29 | 30 | 31 | 32 | 33 | 34 | 35 | 36 | 37 | 38 |
|---|---|---|---|---|---|---|---|---|---|---|---|---|---|---|---|---|---|---|---|---|---|---|---|---|---|---|---|---|---|---|---|---|---|---|---|---|---|---|
| Ground | H | A | A | H | A | H | A | A | H | H | H | A | H | H | A | H | A | H | H | A | H | A | H | A | H | A | H | A | A | A | H | A | H | H | A | H | A | H |
| Result | L | L | D | L | L | D | W | L | L | L | W | W | D | W | W | L | D | W | L | L | W | W | L | L | D | W | L | L | W | D | L | L | W | L | L | L | W | D |
| Position | 12 | 11 | 10 | 11 | 12 | 11 | 10 | 10 | 10 | 11 | 10 | 8 | 10 | 9 | 7 | 8 | 8 | 8 | 8 | 8 | 8 | 6 | 8 | 9 | 9 | 6 | 7 | 7 | 7 | 7 | 8 | 8 | 8 | 9 | 9 | 10 | 8 | 8 |

Source: See Results
A = Away; H = Home; W = Win; D = Draw; L = Loss

==== Results ====
| 29 July 2000 1 | Motherwell | 0–2 | Dundee | Motherwell |
| BST (UTC+1) | Kemble (yellow card) | | Billio 8' (yellow card); Ngonge (yellow card) (yellow-red card) 50'; Artero 86' | Stadium: Fir Park; Attendance: 6,161; Referee: John Rowbotham |

| 5 August 2000 2 | Celtic | 1–0 | Motherwell | Glasgow |
| BST (UTC+1) | Petrov 11'; McNamara (yellow card) (yellow-red card) 66'; Sutton (yellow card) (yellow-red card) 81' | | Davies (yellow card) (yellow-red card) 37'; Strong (yellow card); McCulloch (yellow card); Kemble (yellow card) | Stadium: Celtic Park; Attendance: 58,534; Referee: Alan Freeland |

| 12 August 2000 3 | Dundee United | 1–1 | Motherwell | Dundee |
| BST (UTC+1) | Paterson 86' | | Spencer 11' | Stadium: Tannadice; Attendance: 6,201; Referee: Willie Young |

| 16 August 2000 4 | Motherwell | 0–1 | Dunfermline Athletic | Motherwell |
| BST (UTC+1) | Strong (yellow card); Spencer (yellow card) | | Moss 55'; Ferguson (yellow card) | Stadium: Fir Park; Attendance: 5,257 |

| 19 August 2000 5 | Kilmarnock | 3–2 | Motherwell | Kilmarnock |
| BST (UTC+1) | Dargo 26' (yellow card); Wright 76' (pen.); Dindeleux 80' | | Elliott 7', 65'; Hammell (yellow card) | Stadium: Rugby Park; Attendance: 6,533; Referee: George Clyde |

| 27 August 2000 6 | Motherwell | 1–1 | Aberdeen | Motherwell |
| BST (UTC+1) | McCulloch 22' (yellow card); Strong (yellow card); Brannan (yellow card) | | Winters 10'; Young (yellow card) | Stadium: Fir Park; Attendance: 5,541; Referee: John Rowbotham |

| 9 September 2000 7 | St Mirren | 0–1 | Motherwell | Paisley |
| BST (UTC+1) | | | McCulloch 53'; McMillan (yellow card); Goodman (yellow card) | Stadium: Love Street; Attendance: 5,274; Referee: Stuart Dougal |

| 16 September 2000 8 | Hibernian | 2–0 | Motherwell | Edinburgh |
| BST (UTC+1) | Paatelainen 49', 80'; Fenwick (yellow card); Sauzée (yellow card); Lehmann (yellow card) | | Oueifio (yellow card); Hammell (yellow card); Townsley (yellow card); Strong (yellow card) | Stadium: Easter Road; Attendance: 9,852; Referee: Michael McCurry |

| 23 September 2000 9 | Motherwell | 0–1 | Rangers | Motherwell |
| BST (UTC+1) | Leitch (yellow card); Twaddle (yellow card); Spencer (yellow card) | | Mols 11'; Amoruso (yellow card); Tugay (yellow card) | Stadium: Fir Park; Attendance: 11,275; Referee: Stuart Dougal |

| 1 October 2000 10 | Hearts | 3–0 | Motherwell | Edinburgh |
| BST (UTC+1) | Durie 13', 58'; Kirk 27'; James (yellow card); Naysmith (yellow card) | | Oueifio (red card) 8'; McCulloch (yellow card); Kemble (yellow card) | Stadium: Tynecastle; Attendance: 10,460; Referee: Willie Young |

| 14 October 2000 11 | Motherwell | 4–0 | St Johnstone | Motherwell |
| BST (UTC+1) | Dods 20' (o.g.); McCulloch 26'; Brannan 64'; Elliott 71'; Kemble (yellow card) (yellow-red card) 78'; Elliott (yellow card) | | | Stadium: Fir Park; Attendance: 4,483; Referee: Kevin Toner |

| 21 October 2000 12 | Dundee | 1–2 | Motherwell | Dundee |
| BST (UTC+1) | Caniggia 21'; Bonetti (yellow card); Carranza (yellow card) | | Elliott 1', 5'; Strong (yellow card); McMillan (yellow card); McCulloch (yellow card); Brannan (yellow card) | Stadium: Dens Park; Attendance: 7,344; Referee: John Fleming |

| 29 October 2000 13 | Motherwell | 3–3 | Celtic | Motherwell |
| GMT (UTC) | Adams 22'; McCulloch 53' (yellow card); Brannan 78' (pen.); Strong (yellow card); Corrigan (yellow card) | | Mjällby 13'; Valgaeren 57'; McNamara 71' | Stadium: Fir Park; Attendance: 10,820; Referee: Hugh Dallas |

| 4 November 2000 14 | Motherwell | 2–1 | Dundee United | Motherwell |
| GMT (UTC) | Brannan 44' (pen.) (yellow card); Elliott 50'; McMillan (yellow card) | | Lauchlan (red card) 31'; Naveda 55'; McQuillan (yellow card); Miller (yellow card) | Stadium: Fir Park; Attendance: 6,864; Referee: Alan Freeland |

| 11 November 2000 15 | Dunfermline Athletic | 1–2 | Motherwell | Dunfermline |
| GMT (UTC) | Moss 11' (yellow card); Nicholson (yellow card); Skinner (yellow card) | | Townsley 85'; Brannan 90' (pen.); Strong (yellow card); Leitch (yellow card); Townsley (yellow card) | Stadium: East End Park; Attendance: 4,488; Referee: John Underhill |

| 18 November 2000 16 | Motherwell | 1–2 | Kilmarnock | Motherwell |
| GMT (UTC) | Brannan 3' (yellow card); Elliott (yellow card) | | Wright 37'; Cocard 87'; Dindeleux (yellow card); Durrant (yellow card); McLaren (yellow card) | Stadium: Fir Park; Attendance: 6,571; Referee: Eric Martindale |

| 25 November 2000 17 | Aberdeen | 3–3 | Motherwell | Aberdeen |
| GMT (UTC) | Stavrum 41'; Di Rocco 80', 90'; Rowson (yellow card) | | Townsley 14'; McCulloch 43', 69'; Leitch (yellow card); Townsley (yellow card) | Stadium: Pittodrie Stadium; Attendance: 12,324; Referee: Hugh Dallas |

| 29 November 2000 18 | Motherwell | 2–0 | St Mirren | Motherwell |
| GMT (UTC) | Twaddle 74' (yellow card); Nicholas 90' | | | Stadium: Fir Park; Attendance: 5,312; Referee: Garry Mitchell |

| 3 December 2000 19 | Motherwell | 1–3 | Hibernian | Motherwell |
| GMT (UTC) | Elliott 83'; Leitch (yellow card); Brannan (yellow card) | | Zitelli 38', 54' (yellow card); Townsley 48' (o.g.); Laursen (yellow card); Sauzée (yellow card); O'Neil (yellow card) | Stadium: Fir Park; Attendance: 5,715; Referee: John Rowbotham |

| 10 December 2000 20 | Rangers | 2–0 | Motherwell | Glasgow |
| GMT (UTC) | Konterman 39'; Ferguson 78'; Wilson (yellow card); Ricksen (yellow card) | | Corrigan (yellow card); Brannan (yellow card); Twaddle (yellow card); Oueifio (yellow card) | Stadium: Ibrox; Attendance: 46,058; Referee: Tom Brown |

| 16 December 2000 21 | Motherwell | 2–0 | Hearts | Motherwell |
| GMT (UTC) | Townsley 56'; Adams 87' | | | Stadium: Fir Park; Attendance: 5,440; Referee: Michael McCurry |

| 23 December 2000 22 | St Johnstone | 2–3 | Motherwell | Perth |
| GMT (UTC) | Parker 52'; Sylla 72' (yellow card); Dods (yellow card) | | Spencer 6'; Adams 40'; Townsley 43'; Adams (yellow card) (yellow-red card) 49'; Hammell (yellow card) | Stadium: McDiarmid Park; Attendance: 3,489; Referee: Michael McCurry |

| 26 December 2000 23 | Motherwell | 0–3 | Dundee | Motherwell |
| GMT (UTC) | Nicholas (red card) 57'; Spencer (yellow card) | | Sara 4', 69' (yellow card); Rae 35' (yellow card); Marrocco (yellow card) (yellow-red card) 53'; Tweed (yellow card) del Río (yellow card) | Stadium: Fir Park; Attendance: 6,183; Referee: Douglas McDonald |

| 2 January 2001 24 | Dundee United | 2–0 | Motherwell | Dundee |
| GMT (UTC) | Easton 55'; Hamilton 62'; Lauchlan (yellow card); Lilley (yellow card) | | Strong (yellow card); Townsley (yellow card) | Stadium: Tannadice; Attendance: 6,311; Referee: Eric Martindale |

| 31 January 2001 25 | Motherwell | 1–1 | Dunfermline Athletic | Motherwell |
| GMT (UTC) | McCulloch 69'; Adams (yellow card); Goodman (yellow card) | | Bullen 89'; Nicholson (yellow card); Mason (yellow card) | Stadium: Fir Park; Attendance: 4,601; Referee: Bobby Orr |

| 3 February 2001 26 | Kilmarnock | 1–2 | Motherwell | Kilmarnock |
| GMT (UTC) | Dargo 90' | | Brannan 29' (pen.); Twaddle 83'; Leitch (yellow card); Townsley (yellow card) | Stadium: Rugby Park; Attendance: 6,018; Referee: John Underhill |

| 10 February 2001 27 | Motherwell | 0–1 | Aberdeen | Motherwell |
| GMT (UTC) | Leitch (yellow card); Spencer (yellow card) | | Young 88'; Rowson (yellow card); Belabed (yellow card) | Stadium: Fir Park; Attendance: 6,680; Referee: Michael McCurry |

| 21 February 2001 28 | Celtic | 1–0 | Motherwell | Glasgow |
| GMT (UTC) | Moravčík 83' | | Kemble (yellow card); Adams (yellow card); Leitch (yellow card); Townsley (yellow card); Lasley (yellow card) | Stadium: Celtic Park; Attendance: 58,880; Referee: John Rowbotham |

| 24 February 2001 29 | St Mirren | 0–1 | Motherwell | Paisley |
| GMT (UTC) | | | Townsley 74'; Hammell (yellow card); Adams (yellow card); Elliott (yellow card) | Stadium: Love Street; Attendance: 4,034; Referee: Douglas McDonald |

| 4 March 2001 30 | Hibernian | 1–1 | Motherwell | Edinburgh |
| GMT (UTC) | Latapy 82'; Libbra (yellow card) | | Strong 81' (yellow card); Corrigan (yellow card); Adams (yellow card); Townsley (yellow card); Elliott (yellow card) | Stadium: Easter Road; Attendance: 9,500; Referee: Kenny Clark |

| 17 March 2001 31 | Motherwell | 1–2 | Rangers | Motherwell |
| GMT (UTC) | Goodman 2'; Chiba (yellow card); Lasley (yellow card) | | Fernandes 59'; Malcolm 89' (yellow card) | Stadium: Fir Park; Attendance: 11,208; Referee: Alan Freeland |

| 31 March 2001 32 | Hearts | 3–0 | Motherwell | Edinburgh |
| BST (UTC+1) | Tomaschek 15'; Kirk 63', 80' | | Chiba (yellow card); Leitch (yellow card) | Stadium: Tynecastle; Attendance: 11,581; Referee: David Somers |

| 7 April 2001 33 | Motherwell | 1–0 | St Johnstone | Motherwell |
| BST (UTC+1) | Elliott 24' | | | Stadium: Fir Park; Attendance: 4,600; Referee: Douglas McDonald |

| 21 April 2001 34 | Motherwell | 0–1 | St Johnstone | Motherwell |
| BST (UTC+1) | | | Sylla 63'; Weir (yellow card) | Stadium: Fir Park; Attendance: 3,195; Referee: Kevin Toner |

| 28 April 2001 35 | Dundee United | 1–0 | Motherwell | Dundee |
| BST (UTC+1) | Buchan 36'; Miller (yellow card) | | Okoli (yellow card) (yellow-red card) 56'; Oueifio (yellow card); Lasley (yellow card) | Stadium: Tannadice; Attendance: 5,928; Referee: John Underhill |

| 5 May 2001 36 | Motherwell | 0–2 | Aberdeen | Motherwell |
| BST (UTC+1) | | | Stavrum 30'; Winters 57'; Belabed (yellow card) | Stadium: Fir Park; Attendance: 3,905; Referee: Ian Fyfe |

| 12 May 2001 37 | Dunfermline Athletic | 1–2 | Motherwell | Dundee |
| BST (UTC+1) | Crawford 34' (pen.); Doesburg (red card) 88' | | Elliott 8', 16' | Stadium: Tannadice; Attendance: 5,928; Referee: John Underhill |

| 20 May 2001 38 | Motherwell | 3–3 | St Mirren | Motherwell |
| BST (UTC+1) | Lasley 3'; Elliott 72' (pen.), 77' (yellow card) | | Quitongo 32', 57'; Fenton 49'; Turner (red card) 72' | Stadium: Fir Park; Attendance: 4,158; Referee: Willie Young |

=== Scottish Cup ===
| 27 January 2001 Third round | St Mirren | 1–2 | Motherwell | Paisley |
| GMT (UTC) | Quitongo 89'; Walker (yellow card); Fenton (yellow card); Gillies (yellow card) | | McCulloch 32'; Goodman (yellow card) (yellow-red card) 36'; Spencer 64' (yellow card); Strong (yellow card) (yellow-red card) 82'; Leitch (yellow card) | Stadium: Love Street; Attendance: 5,002; Referee: Willie Young |

| 17 February 2001 Fourth round | Motherwell | 0–2 | Dundee United | Motherwell |
| GMT (UTC) | Spencer (yellow card) | | Miller 32'; Easton 38' de Vos (yellow card) | Stadium: Fir Park; Attendance: 6,186; Referee: Stuart Dougal |

=== League Cup ===
| 22 August 2000 Second Round | Queens Park | 0–3 | Motherwell | Glasgow |
| BST (UTC+1) | Duncan (yellow card) | | Strong 13'; Harvey 70' (yellow card); McCulloch 90'; Hammell (yellow card); Corrigan (yellow card); Adams (yellow card) | Stadium: Hampden Park; Attendance: 1,845; Referee: Michael McCurry |

| 6 September 2000 Third Round | Dunfermline Athletic | 2–0 | Motherwell | Dunfermline |
| BST (UTC+1) | Thomson 12'; Moss 66' | | McMillan (yellow card); McCulloch (yellow card) | Stadium: East End Park; Attendance: 3,428; Referee: Alan Freeland |

== Squad statistics ==
As of match played 20 May 2001

=== Appearances ===
| No. | Pos | Nat | Player | Total | | Premier League | | Scottish Cup | | League Cup | |
| No. | Pos | Nat | Player | Apps | Goals | Apps | Goals | Apps | Goals | Apps | Goals |
|---|---|---|---|---|---|---|---|---|---|---|---|
| 2 | DF | (Scotland) SCO | Martyn Corrigan | 40 | 0 | 32+4 | 0 | 2 | 0 | 2 | 0 |
| 4 | DF | (Suriname) SUR | Benito Kemble | 27 | 0 | 25 | 0 | 0 | 0 | 2 | 0 |
| 5 | DF | (Nigeria) NGA | James Okoli | 5 | 0 | 5 | 0 | 0 | 0 | 0 | 0 |
| 6 | DF | (England) ENG | Greg Strong | 34 | 2 | 31+1 | 1 | 1 | 0 | 1 | 1 |
| 8 | MF | (Scotland) SCO | John Davies | 4 | 0 | 2 | 0 | 0 | 0 | 1+1 | 0 |
| 11 | FW | (Scotland) SCO | Stevie Nicholas | 18 | 1 | 5+12 | 1 | 0+1 | 0 | 0 | 0 |
| 12 | MF | (Scotland) SCO | Derek Adams | 29 | 3 | 17+9 | 3 | 2 | 0 | 1 | 0 |
| 14 | FW | (Scotland) SCO | Kevin Twaddle | 27 | 2 | 20+5 | 2 | 1+1 | 0 | 0 | 0 |
| 16 | DF | (Scotland) SCO | Steven Hammell | 38 | 0 | 32+2 | 0 | 2 | 0 | 2 | 0 |
| 17 | GK | (Scotland) SCO | Stevie Woods | 13 | 0 | 12+1 | 0 | 0 | 0 | 0 | 0 |
| 18 | MF | (England) ENG | Derek Townsley | 34 | 5 | 22+8 | 5 | 2+0 | 0 | 2+0 | 0 |
| 19 | MF | (Northern Ireland) NIR | Stuart Elliott | 36 | 12 | 20+13 | 12 | 1+0 | 0 | 1+1 | 0 |
| 20 | MF | (Scotland) SCO | Dougie Ramsay | 10 | 0 | 3+7 | 0 | 0 | 0 | 0 | 0 |
| 21 | MF | (Scotland) SCO | Paul Harvey | 12 | 1 | 10+1 | 0 | 0 | 0 | 0+1 | 1 |
| 22 | MF | (Scotland) SCO | Keith Lasley | 13 | 1 | 6+6 | 1 | 1 | 0 | 0 | 0 |
| 23 | DF | (Central African Republic) CTA | Ange Oueifio | 20 | 0 | 14+3 | 0 | 1 | 0 | 2 | 0 |
| 24 | FW | (Scotland) SCO | Martin Wood | 9 | 0 | 4+4 | 0 | 0 | 0 | 0+1 | 0 |
| 25 | GK | (Scotland) SCO | Jon Connolly | 2 | 0 | 2 | 0 | 0 | 0 | 0 | 0 |
| 27 | FW | (Scotland) SCO | James McFadden | 7 | 0 | 1+5 | 0 | 0+1 | 0 | 0 | 0 |
| 28 | DF | (Scotland) SCO | Brian Dempsie | 1 | 0 | 0 | 0 | 0 | 0 | 0+1 | 0 |
| 41 | MF | (Scotland) SCO | Stephen Pearson | 6 | 0 | 3+3 | 0 | 0 | 0 | 0 | 0 |
| 43 | MF | (Scotland) SCO | Scott Leitch | 29 | 0 | 23+3 | 0 | 2 | 0 | 1 | 0 |
| | MF | (Morocco) MAR | Saïd Chiba | 7 | 0 | 7 | 0 | 0 | 0 | 0 | 0 |
Players away from the club on loan:
| 1 | GK | (Scotland) SCO | Andy Goram | 26 | 0 | 22 | 0 | 2 | 0 | 2 | 0 |
Players who left Motherwell during the season:
| 3 | DF | (Scotland) SCO | Steve McMillan | 27 | 0 | 26 | 0 | 0 | 0 | 1 | 0 |
| 5 | MF | (England) ENG | Ged Brannan | 25 | 6 | 23 | 6 | 1 | 0 | 0+1 | 0 |
| 7 | FW | (Scotland) SCO | John Spencer | 25 | 3 | 20+2 | 2 | 1+1 | 1 | 1 | 0 |
| 9 | MF | (Scotland) SCO | Lee McCulloch | 29 | 9 | 26 | 7 | 1 | 1 | 2 | 1 |
| 10 | FW | (England) ENG | Don Goodman | 21 | 1 | 6+12 | 1 | 1 | 0 | 2 | 0 |
| 44 | MF | (England) ENG | Jamie McClen | 3 | 0 | 1+2 | 0 | 0 | 0 | 0 | 0 |

=== Goal scorers ===
| Ranking | Position | Nation | Number | Name | Premier League | Scottish Cup | League Cup | Total |
|---|---|---|---|---|---|---|---|---|
| 1 | MF | (Northern Ireland) | 19 | Stuart Elliott | 12 | 0 | 0 | 12 |
| 2 | MF | (Scotland) | 9 | Lee McCulloch | 7 | 1 | 1 | 9 |
| 3 | MF | (England) | 5 | Ged Brannan | 6 | 0 | 0 | 6 |
| 4 | MF | (England) | 18 | Derek Townsley | 5 | 0 | 0 | 5 |
| 5 | MF | (Scotland) | 12 | Derek Adams | 3 | 0 | 0 | 3 |
| 5 | FW | (Scotland) | 7 | John Spencer | 2 | 1 | 0 | 3 |
| 7 | FW | (Scotland) | 14 | Kevin Twaddle | 2 | 0 | 0 | 2 |
| 7 | DF | (England) | 6 | Greg Strong | 1 | 0 | 1 | 2 |
| 9 | FW | (England) | 10 | Don Goodman | 1 | 0 | 0 | 1 |
| 9 | MF | (Scotland) | 22 | Keith Lasley | 1 | 0 | 0 | 1 |
| 9 | MF | (Scotland) | 11 | Stevie Nicholas | 1 | 0 | 0 | 1 |
| 9 | MF | (Scotland) | 21 | Paul Harvey | 0 | 0 | 1 | 1 |
| 9 | | | | Own goal | 1 | 0 | 0 | 1 |
| TOTALS | | | | | 42 | 2 | 3 | 47 |

=== Clean sheets ===
| Ranking | Position | Nation | Number | Name | Premier League | Scottish Cup | League Cup | Total |
|---|---|---|---|---|---|---|---|---|
| 1 | GK | (Scotland) | 1 | Andy Goram | 3 | 0 | 1 | 4 |
| 2 | GK | (Scotland) | 17 | Stevie Woods | 3 | 0 | 0 | 3 |
| TOTALS | | | | | 6 | 0 | 1 | 7 |

=== Disciplinary record ===
| Number | Nation | Position | Name | Premier League | | Scottish Cup | | League Cup | | Total | |
| Number | Nation | Position | Name | Booked | Sent off (straight red) | Booked | Sent off (straight red) | Booked | Sent off (straight red) | Booked | Sent off (straight red) |
| 2 | (Scotland) | DF | Martyn Corrigan | 3 | 0 | 0 | 0 | 1 | 0 | 4 | 0 |
| 4 | (Netherlands) | DF | Benito Kemble | 6 | 1 | 0 | 0 | 0 | 0 | 6 | 1 |
| 5 | (Nigeria) | DF | James Okoli | 2 | 1 | 0 | 0 | 0 | 0 | 2 | 1 |
| 6 | (England) | DF | Greg Strong | 9 | 0 | 1 | 1 | 0 | 0 | 10 | 1 |
| 8 | (Scotland) | MF | John Davies | 2 | 1 | 0 | 0 | 0 | 0 | 2 | 1 |
| 11 | (Scotland) | FW | Stevie Nicholas | 1 | 1 | 0 | 0 | 0 | 0 | 1 | 1 |
| 12 | (Scotland) | MF | Derek Adams | 6 | 1 | 0 | 0 | 1 | 0 | 7 | 1 |
| 14 | (Scotland) | FW | Kevin Twaddle | 3 | 0 | 0 | 0 | 0 | 0 | 3 | 0 |
| 16 | (Scotland) | DF | Steven Hammell | 4 | 0 | 0 | 0 | 1 | 0 | 5 | 0 |
| 18 | (England) | MF | Derek Townsley | 7 | 0 | 0 | 0 | 0 | 0 | 7 | 0 |
| 19 | (Northern Ireland) | MF | Stuart Elliott | 5 | 0 | 0 | 0 | 0 | 0 | 5 | 0 |
| 21 | (Scotland) | MF | Paul Harvey | 0 | 0 | 0 | 0 | 1 | 0 | 1 | 0 |
| 22 | (Scotland) | MF | Keith Lasley | 3 | 0 | 0 | 0 | 0 | 0 | 3 | 0 |
| 23 | (Central African Republic) | DF | Ange Oueifio | 3 | 1 | 0 | 0 | 0 | 0 | 3 | 1 |
| 43 | (Scotland) | MF | Scott Leitch | 8 | 0 | 1 | 0 | 0 | 0 | 9 | 0 |
| | (Morocco) | MF | Saïd Chiba | 2 | 0 | 0 | 0 | 0 | 0 | 2 | 0 |
Players away on loan:
Players who left Motherwell during the season:
| 3 | (Scotland) | DF | Steve McMillan | 3 | 0 | 0 | 0 | 1 | 0 | 4 | 0 |
| 5 | (England) | MF | Ged Brannan | 6 | 0 | 0 | 0 | 0 | 0 | 6 | 0 |
| 7 | (Scotland) | FW | John Spencer | 4 | 0 | 1 | 0 | 0 | 0 | 5 | 0 |
| 9 | (Scotland) | MF | Lee McCulloch | 5 | 0 | 0 | 0 | 1 | 0 | 6 | 0 |
| 10 | (England) | FW | Don Goodman | 2 | 0 | 1 | 1 | 0 | 0 | 3 | 1 |
| | | | TOTALS | 84 | 6 | 4 | 2 | 6 | 0 | 94 | 8 |

== See also ==
- List of Motherwell F.C. seasons
