= 1999–2000 Dundee United F.C. season =

Dundee United
1999–2000 season
- Chairman: Jim McLean
- Manager: Paul Sturrock
- Stadium: Tannadice Park
- SPL: Eighth place
- Scottish Cup: Quarter-finals
- League Cup: Semi-finals
- Top goalscorer: League: Billy Dodds (9); All: Billy Dodds (10)
- Highest home attendance: 12,375 vs. Celtic, SPL, 15 August 1999
- Lowest home attendance: 4,682 vs. Ross County, League Cup, 18 August 1999
Home colours	Away colours

The 1999–2000 season was the 91st year of football played by Dundee United, and covers the period from 1 July 1999 to 30 June 2000. United finished in eighth place, an improvement on last year's ninth-place finish, despite accumulating fewer points in this campaign.

== Summary ==
United were knocked out of both domestic cup competitions by Aberdeen – in the League Cup semi-final's and the Scottish Cup quarter-finals, both by a score of 1–0.

United sold top scorer Billy Dodds to Rangers at the start of December and immediately the club's fortunes changed. Sitting third in the league, the club would win only one of the next fourteen league games and three in total for the rest of the season. In fact, United lost 11 of the last 13 matches, consigning them to eighth place. Such was Dodds' impact that he finished top scorer, despite only playing the first four months of the season with the club.

Dundee United played a total of 44 competitive matches during the 1999–2000 season. The team finished eighth in the Scottish Premier League.

In the cup competitions, United were knocked out of the Scottish Cup at the quarter-finals stage, losing 1–0 to Aberdeen. The same team knocked United out of the CIS Insurance Cup, this time at the semi-final stage. Both matches finished 1–0.

Nine players were signed during the 1999–2000 season, with a total (public) transfer cost of around £750,000.

Seven players left the club during the season with only one transfer – Billy Dodds to Rangers – bringing in a fee of £1.3m. The club made a transfer profit of around £500k for the season.

The club's playing kits were sponsored by Telewest for the fourth consecutive season.

Joaquim Ferraz's six league goals came in consecutive games – three times. He found the net in the first two matches of the season, had a fourteen-game gap until two in his next two games before taking six matches to fire his next two goals. He only finished on the losing side once after scoring in the league.

== Fixtures and results ==
All results are written with Dundee United's score first.

=== Scottish Premier League ===
Date	Opponent	Venue	Result	Attendance	Scorers
31 July 1999	Dundee	H	2–1	11,693	Sköldmark, Ferraz
7 August 1999	Motherwell	A	2–2	6,791	Dodds, Ferraz
15 August 1999	Celtic	H	2–1	12,375	Easton, Dodds
21 August 1999	Rangers	A	1–4	48,849	de Vos
29 August 1999	Kilmarnock	H	0–0	6,621	
11 September 1999	Hibernian	H	3–1	8,167	Talesnikov, Hannah, Dodds
18 September 1999	Aberdeen	A	2–1	11,814	Hannah, Dodds
25 September 1999	Heart of Midlothian	H	0–2	8,510	
17 October 1999	Dundee	A	2–0	9,484	Dodds, Thompson
23 October 1999	Motherwell	H	0–2	6,213	
27 October 1999	St Johnstone	A	0–1	4,236	Dodds
31 October 1999	Hibernian	A	2–3	11,073	Dodds, Talesnikov
6 November 1999	Aberdeen	H	3–1	8,170	Dodds (2), Paterson
20 November 1999	Kilmarnock	A	1–1	7,012	Hannah
27 November 1999	St Johnstone	H	1–0	6,367	Talesnikov
5 December 1999	Heart of Midlothian	A	0–3	10,598	
12 December 1999	Dundee	H	1–0	9,185	Ferraz
18 December 1999	Celtic	A	1–4	59,120	Ferraz
27 December 1999	Aberdeen	A	1–3	16,686	Hannah
22 January 2000	Hibernian	H	0–0	7,457	
2 February 2000	Rangers	H	0–4	11,241	
26 February 2000	St Johnstone	A	0–2	4,732	
4 March 2000	Heart of Midlothian	H	0–1	6,928	
15 March 2000	Kilmarnock	H	2–2	6,966	Hannah, Ferraz
25 March 2000	Aberdeen	H	1–1	6,723	Ferraz
1 April 2000	Hibernian	A	0–1	10,261	
4 April 2000	Rangers	A	0–3	45,721	
8 April 2000	Kilmarnock	A	0–1	6,037	
15 April 2000	Rangers	H	0–2	11,149	
19 April 2000	Motherwell	A	3–1	4,271	Mathie, Hannah, de Vos
22 April 2000	Heart of Midlothian	A	2–1	12,604	Mathie (2)
29 April 2000	St Johnstone	H	0–1	6,243	
2 May 2000	Celtic	H	0–1	7,449	
6 May 2000	Dundee	A	0–3	8,581	
13 May 2000	Motherwell	H	1–2	5,908	Hamilton
21 May 2000	Celtic	A	0–2	47,586	

=== Scottish Cup ===
Date	Round	Opponent	Venue	Result	Attendance	Scorers
30 January 2000	Third round	Airdrieonians	H	4–1	5,172	Hannah (2), Mathie, Ferraz
19 February 2000	Fourth round	Alloa Athletic	A	2–2	2,570	Hamilton (2)
22 February 2000	Fourth round replay	Alloa Athletic	H	4–0	4,913	Preget, Hamilton, Thompson (2)
12 March 2000	Quarter–finals	Aberdeen	H	0–1	6,733	

=== Scottish League Cup ===
Date	Round	Opponent	Venue	Result	Attendance	Scorers
18 August 1999	Second round	Ross County	H	3–1	4,682	Ferraz, Thompson (2)
12 October 1999	Third round	St Johnstone	A	2–1	4,805	Davidson, Talesnikov
1 December 1999	Quarter–finals	Motherwell	H	3–2	5,086	Dodds, Easton, Thompson
13 February 2000	Semi–finals	Aberdeen	N	0–1	9,500	

== Player statistics ==
During the 1999–00 season, United used 29 different players, with a further three named as substitutes who did not make an appearance on the pitch. The table below shows the number of appearances and goals scored by each player.

No.	Pos	Nat	Player	Total		SPL		Scottish Cup		League Cup	
No.	Pos	Nat	Player	Apps	Goals	Apps	Goals	Apps	Goals	Apps	Goals
1	GK	(Scotland) SCO	Alan Combe	43	0	35	0	4	0	4	0
2	DF	(France) FRA	Bernard Pascual	39	0	30+2	0	3	0	4	0
3	DF	(Scotland) SCO	Maurice Malpas	17	0	8+4	0	2	0	1+2	0
4	MF	(Scotland) SCO	David Hannah	41	8	33	6	4	2	4	0
5	DF	(Canada) CAN	Jason de Vos	40	2	35	2	2	0	3	0
6	DF	(Iceland) ISL	Sigurður Jónsson	16	0	14	0	2	0	0	0
7	MF	(Scotland) SCO	Craig Easton	38	2	22+10	1	3	0	2+1	1
8	DF	(Sweden) SWE	Magnus Sköldmark	14	1	7+4	1	1+1	0	1	0
9	FW	(Scotland) SCO	Alex Mathie	17	4	10+2	3	2+1	1	0+2	0
10	FW	(Portugal) POR	Joaquim Ferraz	36	8	15+13	6	0+4	1	2+2	1
11	MF	(Scotland) SCO	Tony Smith	9	0	4+3	0	0+2	0	0	0
12	DF	(Scotland) SCO	Scott McCulloch	16	0	10+5	0	1	0	0	0
13	GK	(Scotland) SCO	Paul Gallacher	1	0	1	0	0	0	0	0
14	FW	(Scotland) SCO	Billy Dodds	18	10	15	9	0	0	3	1
15	MF	(Israel) ISR	Jan Talesnikov	30	4	22+3	3	2	0	3	1
16	DF	(Northern Ireland) NIR	Iain Jenkins	3	0	1	0	2	0	0	0
17	MF	(Northern Ireland) NIR	Darren Patterson	10	0	6	0	1	0	3	0
18	MF	(Scotland) SCO	Jim Paterson	8	1	8	1	0	0	0	0
19	FW	(Scotland) SCO	Steven Thompson	34	6	16+11	1	2+1	2	3+1	3
20	DF	(Republic of Ireland) IRL	David Worrell	15	0	10+3	0	0	0	2	0
21	DF	(Wales) WAL	David Partridge	37	0	29	0	4	0	4	0
24	DF	(France) FRA	Jean-Pierre Delaunay	1	0	1	0	0	0	0	0
24	DF	(France) FRA	Antoine Preget	7	1	3+1	0	2	1	1	0
25	FW	(Scotland) SCO	Stephen McConalogue	18	0	9+7	0	1	0	0+1	0
26	MF	(Scotland) SCO	Hugh Davidson	29	1	17+6	0	2+1	0	2+1	1
27	MF	(Greece) GRE	Tassos Venetis	19	0	12+5	0	0	0	1+1	0
28	MF	(Republic of Ireland) IRL	David Byrne	1	0	0+1	0	0	0	0	0
29	MF	(Australia) AUS	Raphael Bove	2	0	0+1	0	0	0	1	0
29	FW	(Scotland) SCO	Jim Hamilton	16	4	8+5	1	3	3	0	0
30	DF	(Scotland) SCO	John McQuillan	12	0	11	0	1	0	0	0
31	FW	(England) ENG	Sean O'Connor	1	0	1	0	0	0	0	0
32	MF	(Wales) WAL	Leigh Jenkinson	4	0	1+3	0	0	0	0	0

=== Goalscorers ===
Thirteen players scored for the United first team with the team scoring 52 goals in total. Despite leaving the club in early December and playing only eighteen matches, Billy Dodds was the top goalscorer, scoring ten goals.

Name	League	Cups	Total
Billy Dodds	9	1	10
Joaquim Ferraz	6	2	8
David Hannah	6	2	8
Steven Thompson	1	5	6
Alex Mathie	3	1	4
Jan Talesnikov	3	1	4
Jim Hamilton	1	3	4
Jason de Vos	2	0	2
Craig Easton	0	2	2
Jim Paterson	1	0	1
Magnus Sköldmark	1	0	1
Hugh Davidson	0	1	1
Antoine Preget	0	1	1

=== Discipline ===
During the 1999–2000 season, eight United players were sent off, and twenty players received at least one yellow card. In total, the team received eight dismissals and 70 cautions.

Name	Cautions	Dismissals
Joaquim Ferraz	(yellow card) 6	(red card) 1
David Hannah	(yellow card) 6	(red card) 1
Craig Easton	(yellow card) 4	(red card) 1
Bernard Pascual	(yellow card) 3	(red card) 1
Darren Patterson	(yellow card) 3	(red card) 1
Steven Thompson	(yellow card) 2	(red card) 1
Antoine Preget	(yellow card) 1	(red card) 1
David McCracken		(red card) 1
David Partridge	(yellow card) 12	
Jan Talesnikov	(yellow card) 9	
Alan Combe	(yellow card) 5	
Siggi Jonsson	(yellow card) 4	
Jason de Vos	(yellow card) 4	
Billy Dodds	(yellow card) 3	
John McQuillan	(yellow card) 3	
Jim Hamilton	(yellow card) 1	
Leigh Jenkinson	(yellow card) 1	
Alex Mathie	(yellow card) 1	
Jim Paterson	(yellow card) 1	
Magnus Sköldmark	(yellow card) 1	
Tassos Venetis	(yellow card) 1	

== Competitions ==
=== League table ===
Pos	Team	Pld	W	D	L	GF	GA	GD	Pts	Qualification or relegation
6	Hibernian	36	10	11	15	49	61	−12	41	
7	Dundee	36	12	5	19	45	64	−19	41	
8	Dundee United	36	11	6	19	34	57	−23	39	
9	Kilmarnock	36	8	13	15	38	52	−14	37	
10	Aberdeen	36	9	6	21	44	83	−39	33	Qualification for the UEFA Cup qualifying round (Note: Since Rangers, the winners of the 1999–2000 Scottish Cup, already qualified for the UEFA Champions League, Aberdeen, the losing finalist, earned a spot in the 2000–01 UEFA Cup. As the bottom team, Aberdeen were also due to take part in a three-team play-off with Dunfermline Athletic and Falkirk, but as Falkirk's stadium did not meet SPL criteria, the play-off did not take place.)

Updated to match(es) played on end of season. Source: Scottish Professional Football League
Rules for classification: 1) Points; 2) Goal difference; 3) Goals scored

== Transfers ==
=== In ===
Date	Player	From	Fee
1 July 1999	(Scotland) Tony Smith	(Scotland) Airdrieonians	Bosman
5 August 1999	(Israel) Jan Talesnikov	(Israel) Beitar Jerusalem	£450,000
17 August 1999	(Republic of Ireland) David Byrne	(Republic of Ireland) Shelbourne	Free
23 September 1999	(Australia) Raphael Bove	(Netherlands) Heerenveen	Free
20 October 1999	(Canada) Pat Onstad	(United States) Rochester Rhinos	£60,000
19 January 2000	(Scotland) Jim Hamilton	(Scotland) Aberdeen	£150,000
17 February 2000	(Scotland) John McQuillan	(Scotland) St Johnstone	£50,000
1 March 2000	(England) Sean O'Connor	(England) Hednesford Town	£30,000
23 March 2000	(Wales) Leigh Jenkinson	(Scotland) Heart of Midlothian	Free
8 June 2000	(England) Hasney Aljofree	(England) Bolton Wanderers	Free
8 June 2000	(England) Jamie Buchan	(Scotland) Aberdeen	Free

=== Out ===
Date	Player	To	Fee
1 October 1999	(Belgium) Tonny Mols	(Scotland) Clyde	Released
30 November 1999	(Australia) Raphael Bove	(Italy) Livorno	Released
30 November 1999	(France) Jean-Pierre Delaunay	Retired	
5 December 1999	(Scotland) Billy Dodds	(Scotland) Rangers	£1,300,000
20 December 1999	(Scotland) Mark McNally	(Scotland) Ayr United	Free
11 April 2000	(France) Antoine Preget	(Greece) Panionios	Free
25 April 2000	(Iceland) Sigurður Jónsson	(Iceland) ÍA	Free
