= Kizys =

Kizys or Kižys is a surname. Notable people with this surname include:

- Algis Kizys (born 1960), American bass guitarist
- Marius Kižys (born 1982), Lithuanian footballer
