= 2001 France v Algeria football match =

France v Algeria (2001)
- Event: International friendly
France	Algeria
(France)	(Algeria)
4	1
- Date: 6 October 2001
- Venue: Stade de France, Saint-Denis
- Referee: Paulo Costa (Portugal)
- Attendance: 78,421

On 6 October 2001, France hosted Algeria in an international friendly in Saint-Denis' Stade de France.

It was the first time France played against Algeria after the latter gained independence from the former in 1962. Both Algerian and French players were presented as 'messengers of peace' before the start of the game but the French national anthem was booed by many of the fans. However, the match ended on the 76th minute due to a fan pitch invasion. France has not played against Algeria since.

== Match info ==
6 October 2001

France	4–1	Algeria
Candela 20'; Petit 32'; Henry 41'; Pires 55'	Report	Belmadi 45'

Stade de France, Paris
Attendance: 78,421
Referee: Paulo Costa (Portugal)

GK	16	Fabien Barthez
CB	15	Lilian Thuram
CB	8	Marcel Desailly (c)
CB	18	Frank Leboeuf
RM	7	Robert Pires
CM	17	Emmanuel Petit
CM	4	Patrick Vieira
LM	2	Vincent Candela
AM	10	Zinedine Zidane
CF	20	David Trezeguet
CF	12	Thierry Henry
Substitutes:
DF	13	Mikaël Silvestre
MF	14	Claude Makélélé
MF	6	Youri Djorkaeff
FW	11	Sylvain Wiltord
Manager:
(France) Roger Lemerre

GK	1	Hichem Mezaïr
DF	23	Mohamed Bradja
DF	13	Mehdi Méniri
DF	17	Slimane Raho
DF	3	Moulay Haddou
MF	7	Omar Belbey
MF	19	Djamel Belmadi
MF	6	Yazid Mansouri
MF	8	Nasreddine Kraouche
FW	9	Farid Ghazi
FW	10	Abdelhafid Tasfaout (c)
Substitutes:
FW		Rafik Saïfi
DF		Mounir Zeghdoud
FW		Rachid Djebaili
Manager:
(Algeria) Rabah Madjer
