= Derek Stillie =

Scottish footballer (born 1973)

Personal information
- Full name: Derek Daniel Stillie
- Date of birth: 3 December 1973 (age 52)
- Place of birth: Irvine, Scotland
- Position: Goalkeeper

Youth career
- 1991–1995: Aberdeen

Senior career*
Years	Team	Apps	(Gls)
1994–1999	Aberdeen	22	(0)
1999–2002	Wigan Athletic	44	(0)
2002–2005	Dunfermline Athletic	96	(0)
2005–2007	Dundee United	67	(0)
2007–2008	Gillingham	14	(0)
Total		233	(0)

International career
1993–1995	Scotland U21	14	(0)
- * Club domestic league appearances and goals

Derek Daniel Stillie (born 3 December 1973) is a Scottish retired footballer who played as a goalkeeper for a number of clubs in Scotland and England. After retiring from football, Stillie pursued a career in law and politics, and contested the 2019 UK general election as the Conservative candidate for the Central Ayrshire constituency.

He is currently on the coaching staff at Ayr United.

== Football career ==
=== Club ===
Raised in Cumnock, Stillie started his career as a youth player at Aberdeen and signed a professional contract in August 1995 at the age of 21; by that time he had already made his senior debut during the 1993–94 season due to an injury crisis. He was an unused substitute as the Dons won the 1995–96 Scottish League Cup, but did not make any appearances that season with Theo Snelders and Michael Watt ahead of him; he remained a back-up as Nicky Walker came in as first choice for a short period, and then the veteran Jim Leighton took the place. In six years at Pittodrie, Stillie managed only 25 appearances in all competitions and in 1999 he moved to Wigan Athletic. At the Lancashire club he played 57 times, twice helping them reach the Division Two play-offs.

In July 2002, Stillie moved back to Scotland to sign for Fife club Dunfermline Athletic and became a virtual ever-present for the Pars, making a total of 117 appearances after replacing first-choice keeper Marco Ruitenbeek in November 2002. During the 2003–04 season, Stillie was part of the Dunfermline team that were runners-up to Celtic in the 2004 Scottish Cup Final.

Dundee United manager Gordon Chisholm signed Stillie at the start of the 2005–06 season, bringing him to Tannadice Park for an undisclosed fee after first-choice keeper Tony Bullock signed for Gillingham. In May 2007, Stillie confirmed that he would be leaving Dundee United to relocate to England to pursue his English law career, for which he had begun studying during his time with Wigan. He helped the Terrors to a clean sheet in the final day goalless draw at home to Motherwell.

During the 2007 close season, Stillie signed a one-year contract with Gillingham, making his debut in the 4–0 away defeat to Nottingham Forest on 22 September 2007. Stillie announced his retirement at the end of the 2007–08 season to pursue his career as a lawyer.

=== International ===
Having played more often for the Under-21s (14 appearances across two seasons) than he had for Aberdeen at club level in the same period in the mid-1990s, Stillie was named in two senior Scotland national squads, latterly in October 2003, but never won a full cap; he was an unused substitute in the Future Cup match versus Germany, also in 2003.

On 5 May 2012, Stillie gained his first international cap for Sealand, playing alongside Ralf Little in a game against the Chagos Islands, conceding three goals as the match finished 3–1.

== After football ==
After retiring as a footballer, Stillie became a lawyer. He acted in defence of the footballers David Goodwillie and David Robertson, who were accused of rape. This legal case made history as the first time a rape complainant had successfully sued the accused for civil damages.

In November 2019, Stillie announced that he would be contesting the general election as the Conservative candidate for the Central Ayrshire constituency. Stillie finished in second place as the incumbent MP, Philippa Whitford, was re-elected.

At the 2021 Scottish Parliament election, Stillie was nominated on the Scottish Conservatives list for the West Scotland region. However, as he was placed seventh on the list, he was not one of those elected. He then stood in the South Ayrshire ward of Prestwick at the 2022 Scottish local elections, finishing sixth and failing to get elected.

== Career statistics ==
Club	Season	League		Cup		League Cup		Other		Total	
Club	Season	Apps	Goals	Apps	Goals	Apps	Goals	Apps	Goals	Apps	Goals
Aberdeen	1993–94	4	0	0	0	0	0	0	0	4	0
Aberdeen	1994–95	0	0	0	0	0	0	0	0	0	0
Aberdeen	1995–96	0	0	0	0	0	0	–		0	0
Aberdeen	1996–97	8	0	0	0	0	0	0	0	8	0
Aberdeen	1997–98	2	0	0	0	2	0	–		4	0
Aberdeen	1998–99	8	0	1	0	0	0	–		9	0
Aberdeen	Total	22	0	1	0	2	0	0	0	25	0
Wigan Athletic	1999–00	13	0	2	0	1	0	3	0	19	0
Wigan Athletic	2000–01	18	0	2	0	2	0	–		22	0
Wigan Athletic	2001–02	13	0	1	0	1	0	1	0	16	0
Wigan Athletic	Total	44	0	5	0	4	0	4	0	57	0
Dunfermline Athletic	2002–03	21	0	6	0	1	0	–		28	0
Dunfermline Athletic	2003–04	37	0	7	0	2	0	–		46	0
Dunfermline Athletic	2004–05	38	0	3	0	2	0	1	0	44	0
Dunfermline Athletic	Total	96	0	16	0	5	0	1	0	118	0
Dundee United	2005–06	30	0	1	0	1	0	2	0	34	0
Dundee United	2006–07	37	0	2	0	2	0	–		41	0
Dundee United	Total	67	0	3	0	3	0	2	0	75	0
Gillingham	2007–08	14	0	0	0	0	0	2	0	16	0
Career total		243	0	25	0	14	0	9	0	291	0

== Honours ==
Aberdeen

- Scottish League Cup: 1995–96

Dunfermline Athletic

- Scottish Cup runner-up: 2003–04
