= Rahoui =

Rahoui is a surname. Notable people with the surname include:

- Boualem Rahoui (born 1948), Algerian long-distance runner
- Mohamed Rahoui (born 1988), Algerian footballer
