= Andreu Guerao =

Spanish footballer

Andreu
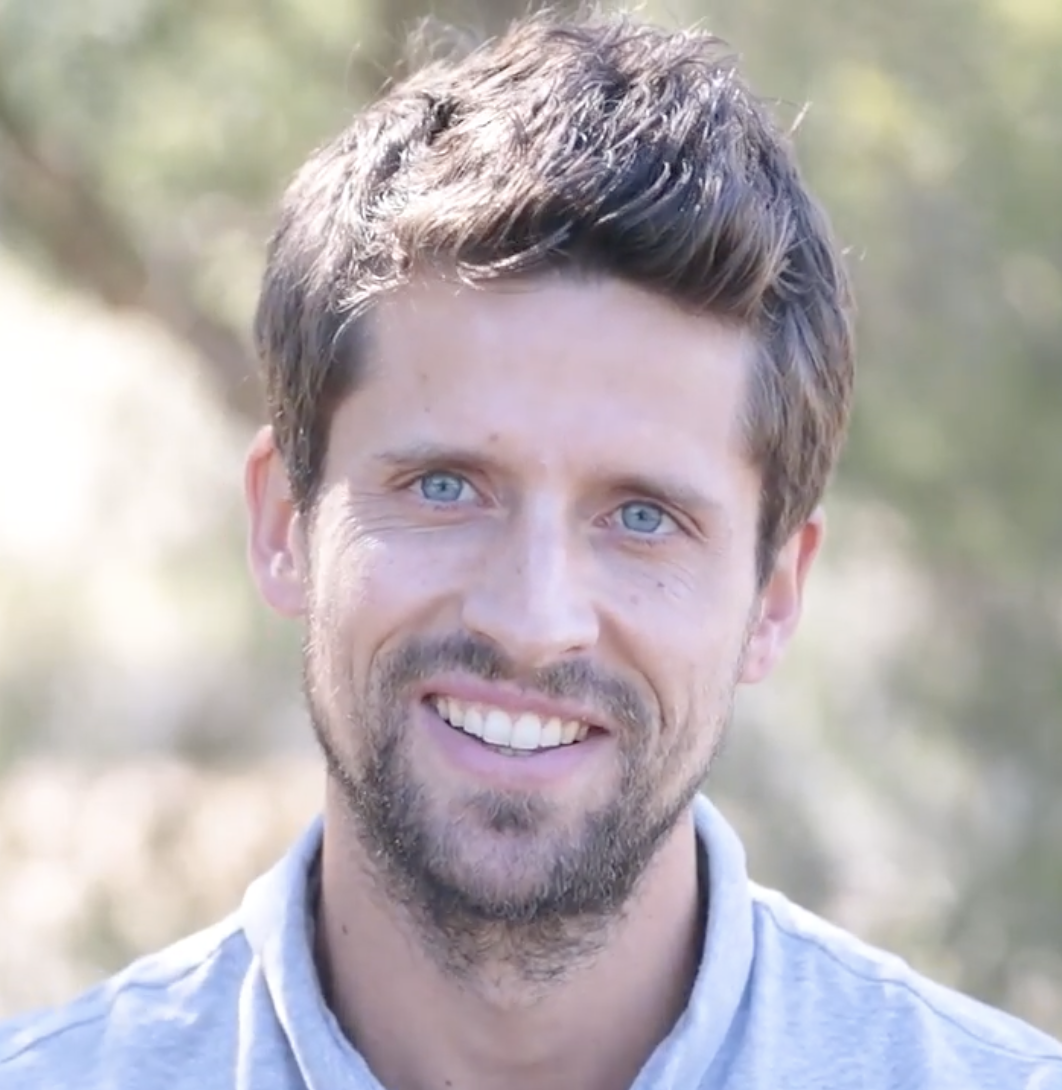
- Andreu in 2016

Personal information
- Full name: Andreu Guerao Mayoral
- Date of birth: 17 June 1983 (age 43)
- Place of birth: Barcelona, Spain
- Height: 1.80 m (5 ft 11 in)
- Position: Midfielder

Youth career
- 1993–2002: Barcelona

Senior career*
Years	Team	Apps	(Gls)
2002–2005	Barcelona C	78	(8)
2003–2005	Barcelona B	12	(0)
2005–2006	Málaga B	33	(2)
2006–2010	Sporting Gijón	41	(1)
2010–2011	Polonia Warsaw	34	(1)
2011	Auckland City	3	(0)
2012	Dinamo Tbilisi	3	(0)
2012–2013	Lechia Gdańsk	8	(0)
2013–2015	Racing Santander	62	(1)
2015–2016	Western Sydney Wanderers	27	(3)
2016–2017	Aris	2	(0)
2017–2018	Perth Glory	17	(0)
Total		320	(16)
- * Club domestic league appearances and goals

Andreu Guerao Mayoral (born 17 June 1983), known simply as Andreu, is a Spanish former professional footballer who played as a midfielder.

== Club career ==
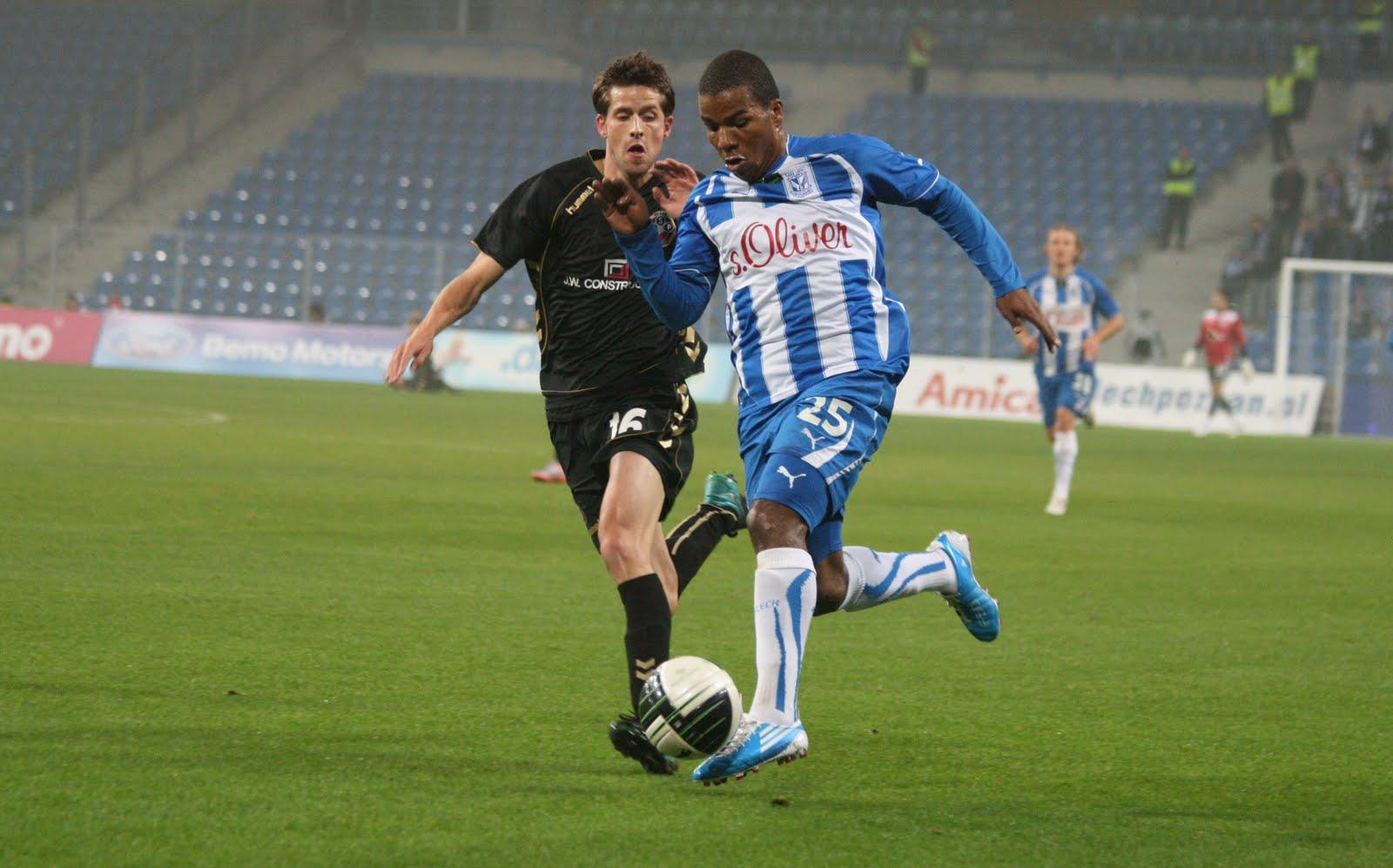
Andreu (left) in action for Polonia Warsaw in 2010

Born in Barcelona, Catalonia, Andreu made his professional debut with FC Barcelona B in the Segunda División B, and was not able to prevent Atlético Malagueño's relegation to that level in the following season. He signed for Sporting de Gijón in July 2006, appearing in just six games as the Asturias club returned to La Liga in 2007–08 and accomplishing the same in 2008–09.

In late January 2010, having only collected a few minutes in that season's Copa del Rey, Andreu was released by Sporting, joining Ekstraklasa side Polonia Warsaw – managed by his compatriot José Mari Bakero – on a one-and-a-half-year deal. On 14 May, he scored in a 1–0 home win against Legia Warsaw in a local derby.

After not having his contract extended, Andreu moved to New Zealand's Auckland City FC. He subsequently had short spells with FC Dinamo Tbilisi and Lechia Gdańsk, appearing rarely for both teams.

Andreu then spent three seasons back in Spain with Racing de Santander, being relegated to the third tier in 2012–13 but achieving promotion the following campaign. He subsequently signed for the Western Sydney Wanderers FC of the A-League, being released on 5 May 2016 after having helped the latter to reach the Grand Final.

On 9 August 2017, following a brief spell in Greece, the 34-year-old Andreu returned to the Australian top division when he joined Perth Glory FC, reuniting with former Sporting teammate Diego Castro in the process. At the end of the regular season, he left.

== Personal life ==
Andreu's older brother, Antonio, was also a professional footballer. He was also developed at FC Barcelona, but spent most of his career in the lower leagues.

In addition to his native Spanish, Andreu could also speak English.

== Career statistics ==
Appearances and goals by club, season and competition
Club	Season	League			Cup		Continental		Total	
Club	Season	Division	Apps	Goals	Apps	Goals	Apps	Goals	Apps	Goals
Barcelona B	2003–04	Segunda División B	1	0	—		—		1	0
Barcelona B	2004–05	Segunda División B	11	0	—		—		11	0
Barcelona B	Total		12	0	—		—		12	0
Málaga B	2005–06	Segunda División	33	2	—		—		33	2
Sporting Gijón	2006–07	Segunda División	29	1	0	0	—		29	1
Sporting Gijón	2007–08	Segunda División	6	0	0	0	—		6	0
Sporting Gijón	2008–09	La Liga	6	0	1	0	—		7	0
Sporting Gijón	2009–10	La Liga	0	0	2	0	—		2	0
Sporting Gijón	Total		41	1	3	0	—		44	1
Polonia Warsaw	2009–10	Ekstraklasa	12	1	0	0	—		12	1
Polonia Warsaw	2010–11	Ekstraklasa	22	0	1	0	—		23	0
Polonia Warsaw	Total		34	1	1	0	—		35	1
Auckland City	2011–12	ASB Premiership	3	0	0	0	3 (Note: Appearances in FIFA Club World Cup)	0	6	0
Dinamo Tbilisi	2011–12	Umaglesi Liga	3	0	0	0	—		3	0
Lechia Gdańsk	2012–13	Ekstraklasa	8	0	2	0	—		10	0
Racing Santander	2012–13	Segunda División	13	0	0	0	—		13	0
Racing Santander	2013–14	Segunda División B	29	1	6	1	3 (Note: Appearances in Segunda División B play-offs)	0	38	2
Racing Santander	2014–15	Segunda División	20	0	0	0	—		20	0
Racing Santander	Total		62	1	6	1	3	0	71	2
Western Sydney Wanderers	2015–16	A-League	27	3	2	0	—		29	3
Aris	2016–17	Football League	2	0	3	0	—		5	0
Perth Glory	2017–18	A-League	17	0	0	0	—		17	0
Career total			242	8	17	1	6	0	265	9
