= Willi Oueifio =

Central African Republic footballer and coach

Personal information
- Full name: Jean-Wilfried Oueifio
- Date of birth: 19 January 1984 (age 42)
- Height: 1.81 m (5 ft 11 1/2 in)
- Position: Defender

Team information
- Current team: JA Drancy

Senior career*
Years	Team	Apps	(Gls)
2002–2003	Heart of Midlothian	3	(0)
2007	SC Düdingen	8	(0)
2008	Vác-Újbuda LTC		
2008–2009	Kaposvári Rákóczi FC	1	(0)
2009	BFC Siofok	0	(0)
2010–2012	JA Drancy	34	(2)

Managerial career
- 2013–: Noisiel FC 77
- * Club domestic league appearances and goals

Jean-Wilfried Oueifio, known as Willi Oueifio (born 19 January 1984) is a former Central African professional football player and current coach, by Noisiel FC 77.

== Coaching career ==
He works since 2013 for Noisiel FC 77 as Head coach in the Ligue de Paris Île-de-France de football.

== Personal life ==
His older brothers Ange Oueifio and Mickaël Oueifio are footballers. Willi also holds French citizenship. Oueifio learned during 1987 and 1993 at the Ecole Grande Prairie in Chelles, Seine-et-Marne.
