= Jean-Pierre Delaunay =

French footballer (born 1966)

Personal information
- Date of birth: 17 January 1966 (age 60)
- Place of birth: Sainte-Adresse, France
- Height: 1.82 m (6 ft 0 in)
- Position: Defender

Team information
- Current team: Le Havre AC (Youth coach)

Senior career*
Years	Team	Apps	(Gls)
- Le Havre AC
1999	Dundee United	1	(0)
- * Club domestic league appearances and goals

Jean-Pierre Delaunay (born 17 January 1966) is a French former footballer who spent most of his career with Le Havre AC, making 315 appearances for Le HAC, a club record. (Note: Jean-Pierre Delaunay – French league stats at LFP – also available in French (archived)) Delaunay is currently a youth coach with the club.

In August 1999 Delaunay signed for Scottish Premier League club Dundee United on a three-month contract, but due to injury problems he played only one match for the club and subsequently retired.

== See also ==
- Dundee United FC Season 1999-00
