= Joaquim Ferraz =

Portuguese footballer (born 1974)

Personal information
- Full name: Joaquim Miguel Leitāo de Freitas Ferraz
- Date of birth: May 16, 1974 (age 52)
- Place of birth: Baltar, Portugal
- Height: 1.96 m (6 ft 5 in)
- Position: Striker

Youth career
- 1989–1992: Paredes

Senior career*
Years	Team	Apps	(Gls)
1992–1994	Paredes	55	(9)
1994–1995	Lamego		
1995–1996	Belenenses	2	(0)
1996–1997	Paços de Ferreira	31	(9)
1997	Belenenses	5	(1)
1998	Gil Vicente	5	(0)
1998–1999	Belenenses	22	(8)
1999–2000	Dundee United	28	(6)
2000–2003	Maritimo	38	(12)
2001–2003	Maritimo B	6	(1)
2003–2004	Penafiel	29	(2)
2004	Qingdao Zhongneng	5	(0)
2004–2006	Sp.Espinho	28	(5)
2006	Marco	15	(5)
2006–2007	Maia	26	(9)
2007–2008	Moreirense	25	(5)
2008–2010	Paredes	53	(19)
2010–2011	Lousada	19	(2)
2011–2013	Salgueiros 08	54	(13)
2013–2014	Paredes	33	(9)
Total		479	(115)
- * Club domestic league appearances and goals

Joaquim Miguel Leitão de Freitas Ferraz (born May 16, 1974), commonly known as Quim, is a Portuguese retired footballer who played as a striker.

== Career ==
Ferraz began his career with Belenenses, making two league appearances in his debut season. In 1996, he moved to Paços de Ferreira, where he managed nine league goals from 31 games. The following year saw a brief spell at Gil Vicente before two seasons back at Belenenses. In July 1999, Ferraz moved on a Bosman transfer to Scottish side Dundee United, and made an instant impact by scoring a late debut winner against city rivals Dundee. Despite scoring three in his first four games, Ferraz fell out of form and finished the season with six from 28 appearances. In 2000, he moved back to Portugal with Marítimo and spent the next three seasons with Os Leões (The Lions), netting 13 goals from 41 league games.

Ferraz then moved clubs from season to season, spending 2003–04 with Penafiel and 2004–05 in China with Qingdao Zhongneng. In July 2005, he had the chance to return to Scottish football, but his trial with Dunfermline Athletic brought no contract. A move to Sporting Espinho followed, with a short spell at Marco, before his move to Maia.

== See also ==
- Dundee United FC Season 1999-00
