= Marco Ruitenbeek =

Dutch footballer (born 1968)

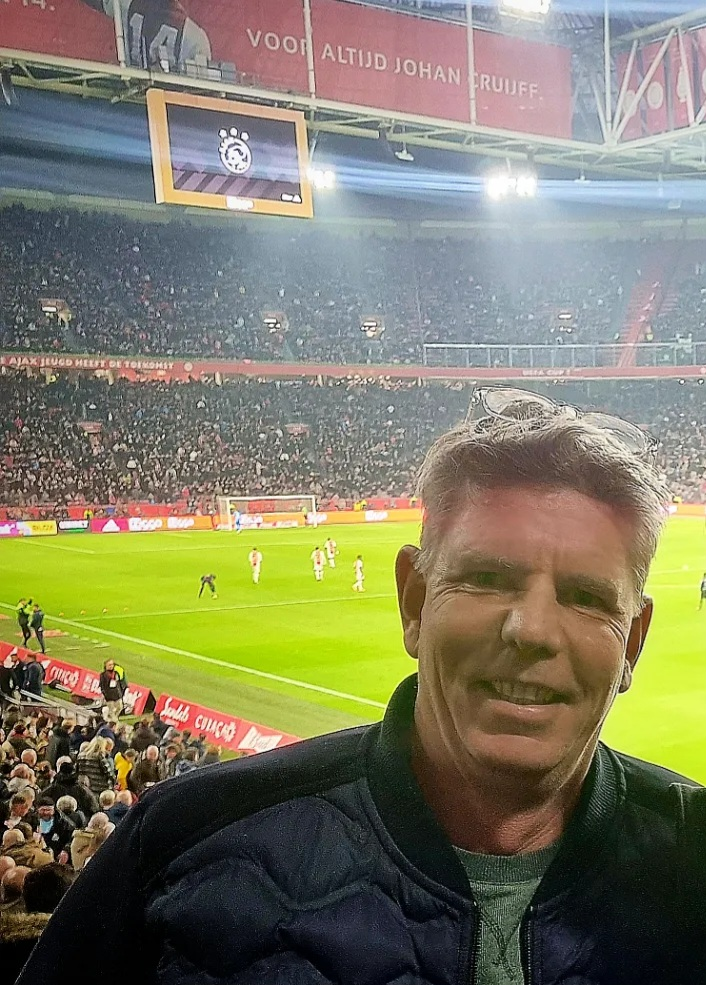

Personal information
- Date of birth: 12 May 1968 (age 58)
- Place of birth: Weesp, Netherlands
- Position: Goalkeeper

Senior career*
Years	Team	Apps	(Gls)
1991–1997	AZ	146	(0)
1997–2000	Go Ahead Eagles	16	(0)
2000–2004	Dunfermline Athletic	83	(0)
2004–2005	SV Huizen		
- * Club domestic league appearances and goals

Marco Ruitenbeek (born 12 May 1968) is a Dutch former professional footballer who played as a goalkeeper for Dutch side AZ and Scottish club Dunfermline Athletic, as well as Go Ahead Eagles and SV Huizen.

== Career ==
Ruitenbeek was born in Weesp, North Holland. He started his career with AZ, making appearances in both the Eredivisie and Eerste Divisie, before moving to Go Ahead Eagles in 1997. He spent three years with the club before moving to Scotland and signing for Scottish Premier League side Dunfermline Athletic in June 2000. He made his debut in a 3–0 friendly defeat against Dundee in August 2000. Ruitenbeek played in the majority of matches in his first two seasons with the club, however he lost his place after Dunfermline signed Wigan Athletic goalkeeper Derek Stillie, making only 20 appearances in the second half of his career with the Pars. His final match with the side came in a one-all draw with Dundee United. Ruitenbeek played over 90 games for the Pars been 2000 and 2004. After he left Scotland, he moved back to the Netherlands to play for Hoofdklasse side SV Huizen, playing with the amateur side for one season, before hanging up his gloves in May 2005.

== Career statistics ==
Appearances and goals by club, season and competition
Club	Season	League			FA Cup		League Cup		Other		Total	
Club	Season	Division	Apps	Goals	Apps	Goals	Apps	Goals	Apps	Goals	Apps	Goals
Dunfermline Athletic	2000–01	Scottish Premier League	36	0	4	0	3	0	0	0	43	0
Dunfermline Athletic	2001–02	Scottish Premier League	29	0	1	0	0	0	0	0	30	0
Dunfermline Athletic	2002–03	Scottish Premier League	17	0	0	0	2	0	0	0	19	0
Dunfermline Athletic	2003–04	Scottish Premier League	1	0	0	0	0	0	0	0	1	0
Career total			83	0	5	0	5	0	0	0	93	0
