= Greg Strong =

English footballer

Personal information
- Full name: Gregory Strong
- Date of birth: 5 September 1975 (age 51)
- Place of birth: Bolton, England
- Position: Defender

Senior career*
Years	Team	Apps	(Gls)
1992–1995	Wigan Athletic	35	(3)
1995–2000	Bolton Wanderers	12	(1)
1997–1998	→ Blackpool (loan)	11	(1)
1999	→ Stoke City (loan)	5	(1)
2000	→ Motherwell (loan)	10	(0)
2000–2002	Motherwell	64	(3)
2002–2004	Hull City	3	(0)
2003	→ Cheltenham Town (loan)	4	(0)
2003	→ Scunthorpe United (loan)	7	(0)
2003	→ Bury (loan)	10	(0)
2004–2005	Boston United	9	(0)
2004–2005	→ Macclesfield Town (loan)	4	(0)
2005–2006	Livingston	39	(1)
2006–2007	Dundee	16	(1)
2007	Halifax Town	8	(1)
2007–2008	Northwich Victoria	17	(0)
2008	Droylsden	14	(0)
2008–2015	Rhyl	64	(10)
Total		332	(22)

International career
1991	England schools	7	(0)
1991	England U16	1	(0)
1993	England U18	1	(0)

Managerial career
- 2009–2015: Rhyl (player-manager)
- * Club domestic league appearances and goals as of 4 May 2010

Gregory Strong (born 5 September 1975) is an English former professional footballer who played as a defender. He was the manager of Rhyl from 2009 until 2015, and chief scout of Plymouth Argyle between 2015 and 2018. He is currently the Head of Recruitment at Oldham Athletic.

Strong had a 20-year-long career in professional football where he was a typical journeyman playing for a large number of clubs. Strong played for Wigan Athletic, Bolton Wanderers, Blackpool, Stoke City, Motherwell, Hull City, Cheltenham Town, Scunthorpe United, Bury, Boston United, Macclesfield Town, Livingston, Dundee, Halifax Town, Northwich Victoria, Droylsden and Rhyl.

== Playing career ==
Strong was born in Bolton and started his footballing career with Wigan Athletic in 1992 after playing for England schoolboys and youth international. He played two seasons with Wigan and then moved to his hometown club Bolton Wanderers in August 1995. He struggled to establish himself at Bolton making just 22 appearances for the club in four seasons. During that time he was loaned out to Blackpool where he made 12 appearances scoring one goal and Stoke City where he played five times in 1998–99 scoring once against his former club Wigan Athletic. He then moved to Scottish side Motherwell in the summer of 1999 where he became a popular player in two seasons at Fir Park.

He returned to England in 2002 when he was signed up by Hull City. After struggling to get games with Hull, Strong had loan spells with Cheltenham Town, Scunthorpe United, and Bury before moving on to Boston United. He spent a short loan at Macclesfield Town before moving to Scotland again to sign for Livingston in 2005.

After a season and a half at Livingston Strong joined Dundee in August 2006. However, he was released by Dundee in late 2006, and on 8 March 2007, he was signed by Conference side Halifax Town. He scored a goal on his debut for the Shaymen after just four minutes, but was released by the club at the end of the season, joining league rivals Northwich Victoria. Strong left Northwich in January 2008 joining Droylsden where he played for the rest of the season.

In the summer of 2008 he joined Welsh League side, Rhyl and he was appointed as player-manager at Rhyl in the summer of 2009. In May 2015 Strong left Rhyl FC by "mutual consent".

== Post-playing career ==
In July 2016, after the appointment of former Motherwell teammate Derek Adams as manager, Strong joined Plymouth Argyle as chief scout. He remained in the role until November 2018.

Strong was appointed Chief Scout of Morecambe in 2022 after a spell with Salford City in a similar role.

Between 2024 and 2026 he was the Head of Recruitment at Scottish club Ross County.

In June 2026, he was appointed by EFL League Two side Oldham Athletic as their Head of Recruitment.

== Career statistics ==
Appearances and goals by club, season and competition
Club	Season	League			FA Cup		League Cup		Other^{[A]}		Total	
Club	Season	Division	Apps	Goals	Apps	Goals	Apps	Goals	Apps	Goals	Apps	Goals
Wigan Athletic	1993–94	Third Division	18	1	0	0	1	0	1	0	20	1
Wigan Athletic	1994–95	Third Division	17	2	1	0	4	0	3	0	25	2
Wigan Athletic	Total		35	3	1	0	5	0	4	0	45	3
Bolton Wanderers	1995–96	Premier League	1	0	0	0	0	0	0	0	1	0
Bolton Wanderers	1996–97	First Division	0	0	0	0	0	0	0	0	0	0
Bolton Wanderers	1997–98	Premier League	0	0	0	0	2	0	0	0	2	0
Bolton Wanderers	1998–99	First Division	5	1	0	0	4	0	0	0	9	1
Bolton Wanderers	1999–2000	First Division	6	0	0	0	4	0	0	0	10	0
Bolton Wanderers	Total		12	1	0	0	10	0	0	0	22	1
Blackpool (loan)	1997–98	Second Division	11	1	0	0	0	0	1	0	12	1
Stoke City (loan)	1998–99	Second Division	5	1	0	0	0	0	0	0	5	1
Motherwell	1999–00	Scottish Premier League	10	0	0	0	0	0	0	0	10	0
Motherwell	2000–01	Scottish Premier League	32	1	1	0	1	1	0	0	34	2
Motherwell	2001–02	Scottish Premier League	32	2	1	0	0	0	0	0	33	2
Motherwell	Total		74	3	2	0	1	1	0	0	77	4
Hull City	2002–03	Third Division	3	0	0	0	0	0	0	0	3	0
Hull City	2003–04	Third Division	3	0	0	0	0	0	2	0	5	0
Hull City	Total		6	0	0	0	0	0	2	0	8	0
Cheltenham Town (loan)	2002–03	Second Division	4	0	0	0	0	0	0	0	4	0
Scunthorpe United (loan)	2002–03	Third Division	7	0	0	0	0	0	2	0	9	0
Bury (loan)	2003–04	Third Division	10	0	0	0	1	0	0	0	11	0
Boston United	2004–05	League Two	9	0	1	0	0	0	1	0	11	0
Macclesfield Town (loan)	2004–05	League Two	4	0	0	0	0	0	0	0	4	0
Livingston	2004–05	Scottish Premier League	9	0	2	0	0	0	0	0	11	0
Livingston	2005–06	Scottish Premier League	30	1	2	0	3	0	0	0	35	1
Livingston	Total		39	1	4	0	3	0	0	0	46	1
Dundee	2006–07	Scottish First Division	16	1	0	0	1	0	1	0	18	1
Halifax Town	2006–07	Conference National	8	1	0	0	0	0	0	0	8	1
Northwich Victoria	2007–08	Conference National	17	0	0	0	0	0	0	0	17	0
Droylsden	2007–08	Conference National	14	0	0	0	0	0	0	0	14	0
Career Total			271	12	8	0	21	1	11	0	311	13

A. The "Other" column constitutes appearances and goals in the Football League Trophy, Football League play-offs and Scottish Challenge Cup.
