= Tonet =

Spanish footballer

Personal information
- Full name: Antonio Guerao Mayoral
- Date of birth: 28 April 1979 (age 47)
- Place of birth: Barcelona, Spain
- Height: 1.81 m (5 ft 11 in)
- Position: Midfielder

Youth career
- 1991–1998: Barcelona

Senior career*
Years	Team	Apps	(Gls)
1998–1999	Alavés B		
1999	Gavà		
2000	Oviedo B	7	(3)
2000–2001	Ávila	30	(7)
2001–2002	Compostela	17	(2)
2003	Reus	10	(0)
2003–2004	Rayo Majadahonda	24	(0)
2004–2005	Fuenlabrada	35	(1)
2005–2007	Alcorcón	58	(4)
2007–2008	Hospitalet	23	(1)
2008–2009	St Mirren	3	(0)
2010	Villajoyosa	9	(0)
2010–2011	La Muela	11	(0)
2011–2012	Santboià		
2012	Júpiter		
Total		227+	(18+)
- * Club domestic league appearances and goals

Antonio Guerao Mayoral (born 28 April 1979), known as Tonet, is a Spanish former professional footballer. Mainly a left midfielder, he could also play as a central defender or a left-back.

== Career ==
=== Spain ===
Born in Barcelona, Catalonia, Tonet was an unsuccessful FC Barcelona youth graduate. As a senior, he played for Deportivo Alavés B, CF Gavà, Real Oviedo Vetusta, Real Ávila CF, SD Compostela, CF Reus Deportiu, CF Rayo Majadahonda, CF Fuenlabrada, AD Alcorcón and CE L'Hospitalet.

In a full decade, Tonet never appeared in higher than Segunda División B.

=== St Mirren ===
Tonet moved to the Scottish Premier League on 4 August 2008, signing a one-year contract with St Mirren. He had previously impressed in a pre-season trial, notably scoring a goal against Football League Championship club Blackpool.

Tonet's league debut came in a 1–0 away defeat against Celtic, and he went on to take part in the first three games, being sent off in the 2–1 loss at Heart of Midlothian. However, after suffering a foot injury from which he never fully recovered, he was deemed surplus to requirements in February 2009, and released by manager Gus MacPherson at the end of the season.

=== Later career ===
Tonet subsequently returned to his country, joining third tier side Villajoyosa CF. Following their relegation, he moved to CD La Muela on a one-year deal, meeting the same fate.

== Personal life ==
Tonet's younger brother, Andreu, was also a footballer. Also brought up at Barcelona, he appeared in La Liga for Sporting de Gijón.
