= Jan Talesnikov =

Israeli footballer and manager

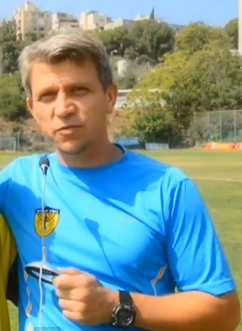
- Talesnikov as Beitar Jerusalem assistant coach, 2012

Personal information
- Date of birth: December 11, 1972 (age 53)
- Place of birth: Soviet Union
- Position: Midfielder

Youth career
- Maccabi Ironi Ashdod

Senior career*
Years	Team	Apps	(Gls)
1990–1996	Maccabi Ironi Ashdod	109	(5)
1996–1998	Beitar Jerusalem	76	(2)
1999–2000	Dundee United	25	(3)
2000–2003	Beitar Jerusalem	80	(0)
2003–2005	F.C. Ashdod	36	(0)
2005–2007	Hapoel Jerusalem	44	(1)

International career
1998–2001	Israel	21	(4)
- * Club domestic league appearances and goals

Jan Talesnikov (Hebrew: ז'אן טלסניקוב, Russian: Ян Талесников; born December 11, 1972) is an Israeli retired footballer and the current manager.

== Early life ==
Talesnikov was born on 11 December 1972, in the Russian Republic of the Soviet Union, emigrating to Israel at the age of 7. He started playing football in the Youth Section of Maccabi Ironi Ashdod.

== Playing career ==
=== Club ===
Talesnikov was promoted to the senior squad at Ashdod in 1990. Following relegation in 1995, he was transferred to Beitar Jerusalem in 1996, going on to win two league titles and the Toto Cup.

In 1999, Talesnikov joined Dundee United in the Scottish Premier League, before rejoining Beitar Jerusalem one year later. He signed for F.C. Ironi Ashdod in 2003, and then for Hapoel Jerusalem in 2005, before announcing his retirement in May, 2007.

=== International ===
Talesnikov played international football for his adopted country of Israel. He made his debut in a friendly match against Turkey in 1998, scoring a goal. In total, he played 21 games for Israel and scored 4 goals.

== Coaching career ==
Before his retirement, Talesnikov began studying football coaching at the Wingate Institute. In 2007, he coached in the Israeli Beach Soccer League before being appointed as coach of the Beitar Jerusalem youth team in 2008.

In 2009, he was appointed as the assistant coach to Guy Azouri at Hapoel Be'er Sheva. After the resignation of Azouri, Talesnikov continued to assist his successor, Vico Haddad. In 2010, he was appointed director of the youth department of F.C. Ashdod, a position he held until his resignation in 2011.

In January 2012, Talesnikov was appointed assistant coach of Beitar Jerusalem. He left this job in June, 2013. In September 2013 he was appointed assistant coach at the girls' football academy of the Israel Football Association.

== Acting career ==
In 2005, Talesnikov finished his acting studies at the Camera Obscura School of Arts, and graduated in screenwriting at the Sam Spiegel School in 2006. That year, he played a supporting role in the film Little Heroes. He has also appeared in the TV series Champion and Love Anna.

== Honours ==
- Israeli Premier League (2):
  - 1996–97, 1997–98
- Toto Cup (1):
  - 1997–98

== See also ==
- 1999–2000 Dundee United F.C. season
