= Walter del Río =

Argentine footballer (born 1976)

Personal information
- Full name: Walter José del Río
- Date of birth: June 16, 1976 (age 50)
- Place of birth: Baradero, Argentina
- Height: 1.81 m (5 ft 11 in)
- Position: Defender

Senior career*
| Years | Team | Apps | (Gls) |
| 1996–1997 | Boca Juniors | 3 | (0) |
| 1997–1998 | Huracán de Corrientes | | |
| 1998–2000 | Crystal Palace | 2 | (0) |
| 2000–2002 | Dundee | 42 | (0) |
| 2002–2003 | Carrarese | 31 | (0) |
| 2004–2005 | FC Wohlen | 37 | (6) |
| 2005–2006 | SC Young Fellows Juventus | 30 | (2) |
| 2006–2007 | Extremadura | 28 | (0) |
| 2007–2009 | San Fernando | 65 | (0) |
- * Club domestic league appearances and goals

Walter José del Río, also known as Witcha (born June 16, 1976, in Baradero) is an Argentine retired professional footballer who played as a defender. He also holds Italian citizenship.
