= Saïd Chiba =

Moroccan football manager (born 1970)

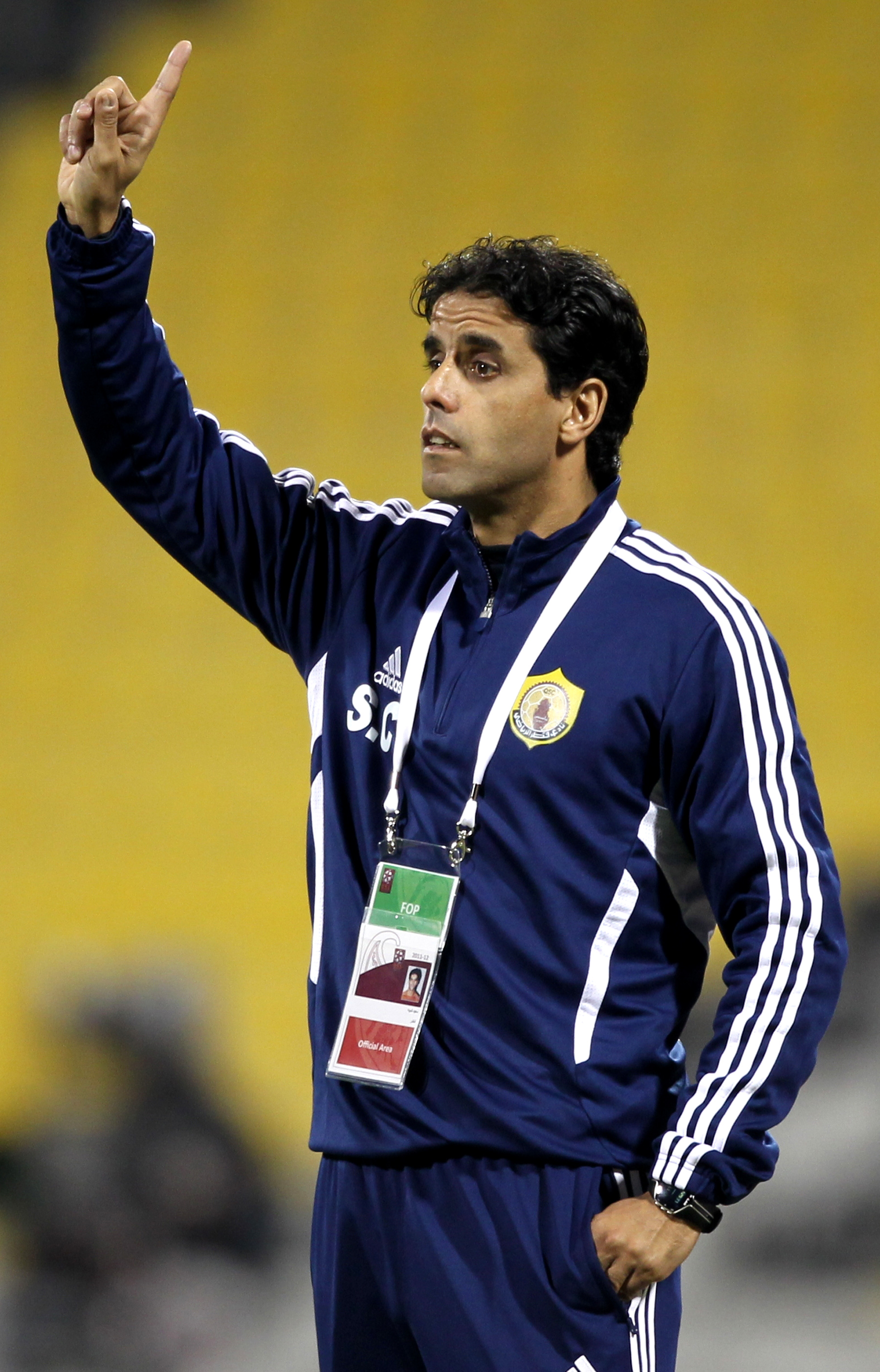
- Chiba in 2011

Personal information
- Date of birth: 28 September 1970 (age 56)
- Place of birth: Rabat, Morocco
- Height: 1.83 m (6 ft 0 in)
- Position: Defensive midfielder

Team information
- Current team: FUS Rabat (manager)

Senior career*
Years	Team	Apps	(Gls)
1988–1995	FUS Rabat		
1995–1996	Al Hilal	22	(17)
1996–1999	SD Compostela	69	(6)
1999–2000	Nancy	32	(2)
2001	Motherwell	7	(0)
2001–2003	Aris Thessaloniki	17	(3)
2003–2004	Qatar SC		
2004–2005	Al Khaleej		
2005–2006	FUS Rabat		
2006–2007	Sharjah		

International career
1991–2001	Morocco	43	(6)

Managerial career
- 2007–2011: Qatar SC (assistant)
- 2011–2012: Qatar SC
- 2014–2016: Morocco (assistant)
- 2019: CR Al Hoceima
- 2020: RCA Zemamra
- 2021: OC Safi
- 2021–2024: Morocco U17
- 2024: Morocco U18
- 2024–: FUS Rabat
- * Club domestic league appearances and goals

Saïd Chiba (Arabic: سعيد شيبا; born 28 September 1970) is a Moroccan football manager and former player who manages Botola Pro club FUS Rabat.

He played for several clubs, including Al-Hilal (Saudi Arabia), SD Compostela (Spain), AS Nancy (France) and Aris Thessaloniki in Greece. He also had a short spell with Motherwell (Scotland). He played for the Morocco national team and was a participant at the 1998 FIFA World Cup.

== Career statistics ==
=== International ===
Scores and results list Morocco's goal tally first, score column indicates score after each Chiba goal.

List of international goals scored by Saïd Chiba
No.	Date	Venue	Opponent	Score	Result	Competition
1	18 March 1992	Stade Mohammed V, Casablanca, Morocco	United States	3–1	3–1	Friendly
2	25 March 1995	Stade Mohammed V, Casablanca, Morocco	Mali	3–0	3–0	Friendly
3	31 May 1997	Prince Moulay Abdellah Stadium, Rabat, Morocco	Ethiopia	1–0	4–0	1998 Africa Cup of Nations qualification
4	27 July 1997	Prince Moulay Abdellah Stadium, Rabat, Morocco	Senegal	2–0	3–0	1998 Africa Cup of Nations qualification
5	13 February 1998	Stade Omnisports, Bobo-Dioulasso, Burkina Faso	Mozambique	1–0	3–0	1998 Africa Cup of Nations
6	22 February 1998	Stade Municipal, Ouagadougou, Burkina Faso	South Africa	1–1	1–2	1998 Africa Cup of Nations
7	2 September 1998	Marchan Stadium, Tangier, Morocco	Senegal	1–0	2–0	Friendly
