= Marius Kižys =

Lithuanian footballer

Personal information
- Date of birth: 21 February 1982 (age 44)
- Place of birth: Kretinga, Lithuania
- Height: 1.77 m (5 ft 10 in)
- Position: Midfielder

Team information
- Current team: Vang/Tvorup if
- Number: 13

Senior career*
Years	Team	Apps	(Gls)
2001–2003	FK Žalgiris Vilnius	32	(3)
2004	FBK Kaunas	1	(0)
2004	FK Šilutė	11	(6)
2005	Hearts	7	(0)
2005–2006	FK Šilutė	31	(3)
2007	ŁKS Łódź	11	(3)
2007–2010	Górnik Zabrze	34	(0)
2010	FK Tauras Tauragė	8	(3)
2011–2012	FC Nizhny Novgorod	1	(0)
2017–2018	Sjørring Boldklub	3	(3)
2018–	Vang/Tvorup if	8	(11)
- * Club domestic league appearances and goals as of 14:44, 31 May 2012 (UTC)

Marius Kižys (born 21 February 1982) is a Lithuanian footballer. He is currently playing for Vang Tvorup IF. Previously he has played for FBK Kaunas, FK Šilutė, ŁKS Łódź and Scottish Premier League side Heart of Midlothian.
