= Antoine Préget =

French footballer (born 1972)

Personal information
- Date of birth: 5 October 1972 (age 54)
- Place of birth: Sète, France
- Height: 1.83 m (6 ft 0 in)
- Position: Defender

Youth career
- Le Grau du Roi

Senior career*
Years	Team	Apps	(Gls)
1994–1997	Nîmes		
1997–1998	Châteauroux	17	(1)
1998–1999	Toulouse	22	(1)
1999	Raith Rovers	2	(0)
1999–2000	Dundee United	4	(0)
2000–2001	Panionios	12	(2)
2001–2003	Cannes		
2003–2004	Marseille Endoume	8	(2)
- * Club domestic league appearances and goals

Antoine Préget (born 5 October 1972) is a French former professional footballer who played as a defender for a number of European clubs.

== Career ==
Préget began his career with Nîmes and spent three years with Les crocodiles before spending single seasons with Châteauroux and Toulouse. Préget then had a trial with Southampton in a bid to move to British football before joining Scottish side Raith Rovers. A move to Dundee United followed but Préget made just four appearances during his time at Tannadice. A move to Greece beckoned and despite a trial with Reading, Préget headed back to France in 2001 with Cannes.
