= Raphael Bove =

Italian Australian soccer player

Personal information
- Full name: Raphael Bove
- Date of birth: 5 March 1977 (age 49)
- Place of birth: Cassino, Italy
- Position: Defensive midfielder

Youth career
- APIA Leichhardt
- Sydney Olympic

Senior career*
Years	Team	Apps	(Gls)
1994–1997	Sydney Olympic	22	(0)
1997–1999	SC Heerenveen	3	(1)
1999–2000	Dundee United	1	(0)
2000–2001	Livorno	2	(0)
2001–2002	Marconi Stallions	9	(1)
2002–2003	Bankstown City	5	(0)
2003–2005	St George Saints	35	(5)
Total		77	(7)

International career
1997	Australia U20	2	(0)
1998–1999	Australia U23	6	(0)
1998	Australia	1	(0)
- * Club domestic league appearances and goals

Raphael Bove (born 5 March 1977) is an Italian Australian former professional footballer who represented Australia at international level.

== Career ==
Bove was born in Cassino, Italy, and moved to Australia at a young age. He played his early football in Europe, appearing with teams including Dutch club SC Heerenveen and Scottish side Dundee United.

Bove was part of the Australian squad at the 1997 FIFA World Youth Championship, making two substitute appearances. He made his full international debut in November 1998, when his 90th-minute substitute appearance in the friendly match against the United States made him the 442nd player to represent Australia. Hayden Foxe, who started the match, also made his debut in the 0–0 draw in San Jose.
