= Ange Oueifio =

Footballer (born 1976)

Personal information
- Full name: Ange-Barthelemy Goningai Ouefio
- Date of birth: 29 March 1976 (age 50)
- Place of birth: Paris, France
- Height: 1.84 m (6 ft 0 in)
- Position: Centre-back

Youth career
- 1993–1996: Rennes
- 1996–1998: Gent

Senior career*
Years	Team	Apps	(Gls)
1998–1999	Paris Saint-Germain B	3	(0)
1999–2000	FC Denderleeuw EH	32	(0)
2000–2002	Motherwell	17	(0)
2002–2003	1. FC Schweinfurt 05	11	(1)
2003–2005	SC de Bangui		

International career
2000–2003	Central African Republic	3	(0)
- * Club domestic league appearances and goals

Ange-Barthelemy Goningai Ouefio (born 29 March 1976) is a former professional footballer who played as a centre-back. Born in France, he made three appearances for the Central African Republic national team.

== Club career ==
Ouefio was born in Paris. On 29 April 2002, he was released by Motherwell.

== International career ==
Ouefio was a member of the Central African Republic national team.

== Personal life ==
His younger brother Willi Oueifio is also a footballer.

== Career statistics ==
As of match played 8 June 2003

Appearances and goals by national team and year
National team	Year	Apps	Goals
Central African Republic	2000	1	0
Central African Republic	2001	0	0
Central African Republic	2002	1	0
Central African Republic	2003	1	0
Total		3	0
