= Benito Kemble =

Dutch footballer (born 1968)

Personal information
- Date of birth: 27 August 1968 (age 58)
- Place of birth: Nieuw Nickerie, Suriname
- Height: 1.85 m (6 ft 1 in)
- Position: Centre-back

Senior career*
Years	Team	Apps	(Gls)
1991–1993	HFC Haarlem	29	(3)
1993–1995	FC Omniworld		(0)
1995–1996	HFC Haarlem	33	(2)
1996–1997	N.E.C.	14	(0)
1997–1998	VVV-Venlo	32	(1)
1998–1999	FC Eindhoven	19	(1)
1999	N.E.C.	3	(0)
1999–2001	Motherwell	48	(1)
2001–2002	St Johnstone	14	(0)
2003–2004	Syracuse Football Club	33	(0)
2005–2008	FC Omniworld (amateur)		
- * Club domestic league appearances and goals

Benito Kemble (born 27 August 1968 in Nieuw Nickerie, Suriname) is a Dutch former professional footballer who played as a centre-back.

Kemble played in Scottish football for Motherwell and St Johnstone. He scored once for Motherwell in a 6–2 defeat at Rangers.
