= James Okoli =

Nigerian footballer

Personal information
- Full name: James Chuks Okoli
- Date of birth: 11 January 1976 (age 50)
- Place of birth: Nigeria
- Height: 1.85 m (6 ft 1 in)
- Position: Defender

Senior career*
Years	Team	Apps	(Gls)
1995–1996	VVOG		
1996–1997	FC Zwolle	0	(0)
1997–1998	VVOG		
1998–1999	FC Augsburg	14	(0)
1999	Hertha BSC II		
1999–2000	Thesprotos	21	(1)
2000–2001	Motherwell	6	(0)
2002–2003	York City	3	(0)
2003–2004	Dumbarton	2	(0)
2004–2005	FC Ismaning	11	(0)
2005	Zwart Wit '63		
2006	Ionia Hania		
- * Club domestic league appearances and goals

James Chuks Okoli (born 11 January 1976) is a retired Nigerian professional football player. He also holds Dutch citizenship.
