= Rachid Djebaili =

Footballer (born 1975)

Personal information
- Date of birth: 26 April 1975 (age 51)
- Place of birth: Besançon, France
- Height: 1.79 m (5 ft 10 in)
- Position: Forward

Senior career*
Years	Team	Apps	(Gls)
1992–1996	Racing Besançon	56	(10)
1996–1997	SR Delémont		
1997–1998	Olympique Noisy-le-Sec	21	(5)
1998–1999	SR Delémont		
1999–2000	Racing Besançon	4	(0)
2000–2001	Olympique Noisy-le-Sec	31	(10)
2001–2002	St Johnstone	13	(0)
2002–2003	Göztepe	16	(1)
2003–2004	SC Paderborn	5	(0)
2004–2005	Riffa SC		
2005	Lausanne-Sport	5	(0)

International career
2001	Algeria	3	(0)
- * Club domestic league appearances and goals

Rachid Djebaili (born 26 April 1975) is a former professional footballer who played as a forward in five countries. Born in Besançon, France, Djebaili represented the Algeria national team three times. He made his debut in a match against France which had to be abandoned after 74 minutes due to a pitch invasion.

Djebaili joined Scottish Premier League side St Johnstone in 2001 and made 14 appearances, 13 in the league, before leaving the following year.
