= 2002–03 Livingston F.C. season =

Livingston
2002–03 season
- Manager: Jim Leishman
- Stadium: Almondvale Stadium
- SPL: Ninth place
- Scottish Cup: Quarter-final
- League Cup: Third round
- UEFA Cup: First round
- Top goalscorer: League: Rolando Zárate (9); All: Rolando Zárate (10)
- Highest home attendance: 10,004, vs. Rangers, SPL, 2 March 2003
- Lowest home attendance: 3,592, vs. Dunfermline Athletic, Scottish Cup, 13 November 2002
Home colours	Away colours

Season 2002-03 saw Livingston compete in the Scottish Premier League. They also competed in the UEFA Cup, League Cup and the Scottish Cup.

== Summary ==
Livingston competed in Europe for the first time in their history during season 2002–03 reaching the first round of the UEFA Cup. They finished 9th in the Scottish Premier League, reached the Quarter finals of the Scottish Cup and were knocked out by Dunfermline in the third round of the League Cup after a replay.

== Results & fixtures ==
Win Draw Loss

=== Scottish Premier League ===
3 August 2002 1	Livingston	3–2	Motherwell	Almondvale Stadium
15:00	Rubio 8'; Zárate 34', 47'	BBC Report	Leitch 50'; Lehmann 64'	Attendance: 7,124; Referee: John Rowbotham

10 August 2002 2	Dunfermline Athletic	2–1	Livingston	East End Park
15:00	Crawford 28'; Brewster 50'	Livi Mad Report	Xausa 90'	Attendance: 4,751

17 August 2002 3	Partick Thistle	2–2	Livingston	Firhill Stadium
15:00	Mitchell 33', 64'	Livi Mad Report	Rubio 31', 76'	Attendance: 4,255

25 August 2002 4	Livingston	0–1	Kilmarnock	Almondvale Stadium
15:00		BBC Report	Boyd 42'	Attendance: 7,416

1 September 2002 5	Celtic	2–0	Livingston	Celtic Park
15:00	Larsson 26'; Baldé 38'	BBC Report		Attendance: 56,988

11 September 2002 6	Dundee	2–1	Livingston	Dens Park
19:30	Novo 52'; Rae 77'	Livi Mad Report	Nemsadze 31 o.g.'	Attendance: 5,391

14 September 2002 7	Livingston	0–2	Rangers	Almondvale Stadium
15:00		Livi Mad Report	Ross 61'; Ferguson 87 pen.'	Attendance: 10,003

22 September 2002 8	Livingston	1–2	Aberdeen	Almondvale Stadium
15:00	Xausa 56'	BBC Report	Anderson 1'; McNaughton 74'	Attendance: 7,513

28 September 2002 9	Hibernian	1–0	Livingston	Easter Road
15:00	Murray 45'	BBC Report		Attendance: 9,541

6 October 2002 10	Livingston	1–1	Heart of Midlothian	Almondvale Stadium
15:00	Wilson 41'	BBC Report	Stamp 46'	Attendance: 6,512

19 October 2002 11	Dundee United	2–3	Livingston	Tannadice Park
15:00	Lilley 45'; McIntyre 59'	BBC Report	Bollan 69'; Wilson 74'; Dadi 78'	Attendance: 5,572

26 October 2002 12	Motherwell	1–5	Livingston	Fir Park
15:00		BBC Report	Makel 9'; Toure 48' (58); Bingham 81'; Xausa 90'	Attendance: 4,342

2 November 2002 13	Livingston	1–1	Dunfermline Athletic	Almondvale Stadium
15:00	Toure 79'	BBC Report	Brewster 47'	Attendance: 6,324

9 November 2002 14	Livingston	3–0	Partick Thistle	Almondvale Stadium
15:00	Dadi 47'; Andrews 49'; Bingham 59'	BBC Report		Attendance: 6,218

16 November 2002 15	Kilmarnock	2–0	Livingston	Rugby Park
15:00	Di Giacomo 64'; McSwegan 90'	BBC Report		Attendance: 5,270

24 November 2002 16	Livingston	0–2	Celtic	Almondvale Stadium
12:15		BBC Report	Larsson 6', 83 pen.'	Attendance: 10,002

30 November 2002 17	Livingston	1–1	Dundee	Almondvale Stadium
15:00	Juanjo 2'	BBC Report	Novo 72 pen.'	Attendance: 5,307

4 December 2002 18	Rangers	4–3	Livingston	Ibrox Stadium
19:30	Ferguson 8'; Arveladze 10', 18', 46'	BBC Report	Zárate 50', 87'; Wilson 72'; Bollan (yellow card) 75' (red card)	Attendance: 45,992

7 December 2002 19	Heart of Midlothian	2–1	Livingston	Tynecastle Park
15:00	Kirk 5' (70 pen.)	BBC Report	Zárate 63'	Attendance: 8,074

14 December 2002 20	Livingston	1–2	Hibernian	Almondvale Stadium
15:00	Brinquin 90'	BBC Report	Murray 55'; James 66'	Attendance: 6,501

21 December 2002 21	Aberdeen	0–0	Livingston	Pittodrie Stadium
15:00		BBC Report		Attendance: 11,253

26 December 2002 22	Livingston	3–0	Dundee United	Almondvale Stadium
15:00	Junajo 8'; Andrews 51'; Bingham 86'	BBC Report		Attendance: 5,103

29 December 2002 23	Livingston	1–0	Motherwell	Almondvale Stadium
15:00	Zárate 87'	BBC Report		Attendance: 7,216

2 January 2003 24	Dunfermline Athletic	2–0	Livingston	East End Park
15:00	Crawford 45', 57'	BBC Report		Attendance: 5,218

28 January 2003 25	Partick Thistle	1–3	Livingston	Firhill Stadium
19:30	Burns 39'	Livi Mad Report	Andrews 35'; Zárate 70'; McMenamin 80'	Attendance: 3,541; Referee: Ian Fyfe

1 February 2003 26	Livingston	0–4	Kilmarnock	Almondvale Stadium
15:00		BBC Report	McLaren 21', 70'; Canero 34'; Boyd 49'	Attendance: 4,144; Referee: Tom Brown

9 February 2003 27	Celtic	2–1	Livingston	Celtic Park
15:00	Sylla 77'; Sutton 85'	Livi Mad Report	Zárate 52'	Attendance: 57,169; Referee: Mike McCurry

2 March 2003 28	Livingston	1–2	Rangers	Almondvale Stadium
15:00	Dadi 90'	BBC Report	Amoruso 8'; Arveladze 16'	Attendance: 10,004

5 March 2003 29	Dundee	0–0	Livingston	Dens Park
19:30		BBC Report		Attendance: 7,554; Referee: Willie Young

8 March 2003 30	Livingston	1–1	Heart of Midlothian	Almondvale Stadium
15:00	Ramos 61'	Livi Mad Report	Stamp 8'	Attendance: 7,531; Referee: Mike Freeland

15 March 2003 31	Dundee United	0–1	Livingston	Tannadice Park
15:00		BBC Report	Andrews 87'	Attendance: 6,247; Referee: Thompson

5 April 2003 32	Livingston	1–2	Aberdeen	Almondvale Stadium
15:00	Lovell 2'	BBC Report	Young 29'; Sheerin 31'	Attendance: 5,731; Referee: Hugh Dallas

12 April 2003 33	Hibernian	2–2	Livingston	Easter Road
15:00	Orman 44'; Riordan 53'	BBC Report	Wilson 87'; O'Brien 89'	Attendance: 8,150; Referee: John Rowbotham

26 April 2003 34	Aberdeen	1–0	Livingston	Pittodrie Stadium
15:00	Hinds 25'	BBC Report		Attendance: 8,912; Referee: John Underhill

3 May 2003 35	Livingston	3–1	Partick Thistle	Almondvale Stadium
15:00	Xausa 25'; Zárate 44'; Juanjo 50'	BBC Report	Lilley 45'	Attendance: 5,349; Referee: David Somers

10 May 2003 36	Livingston	1–2	Dundee United	Almondvale Stadium
15:00	Bingham 79'	BBC Report	McIntyre 2'; Miller 90'	Attendance: 6,314; Referee: Kenny Clark

17 May 2003 37	Livingston	1–2	Hibernian	Almondvale Stadium
15:00	Pasquinelli 87'	BBC Report	Brown 38', 69'	Attendance: 5,423; Referee: Ian Fyfe

24 May 2003 38	Motherwell	6–2	Livingston	Fir Park
15:00	Lasley 30', 90'; Craig 57'; McFadden 64', 74', 75'	BBC Report	Makel 16'; McMenamin 54'	Attendance: 4,790; Referee: Dougie McDonald

=== Scottish League Cup ===
5 November 2002 Third round	St Johnstone	0–1	Livingston	McDiarmid Park
19:45		Livi Mad Report	Dadi 60'	Attendance: 2,688

13 November 2002 Quarter-final	Livingston	0–2	Dundee United	Almondvale Stadium
19:30	Rubio (yellow card) 73' (red card)	BBC Report	Lilley 38', 73 pen.' Smart (red card) 74'	Attendance: 3,592; Referee: Mike McCurry

=== Scottish Cup ===
25 January 2003 Third round	Livingston	1–1	Dunfermline Athletic	Almondvale Stadium
15:00	Bollan 26'	Livi Mad Report	Crawford 62'	Attendance: 4,106; Referee: Chris Foy

4 February 2003 Third round replay	Dunfermline Athletic	2–0	Livingston	East End Park
19:45	Brewster 67', 90'	Livi Mad Report		Attendance: 3,158; Referee: Chris Foy

=== UEFA Cup ===
13 August 2002 Qualifying Round	(Liechtenstein) FC Vaduz	1–1	Livingston	Rheinpark Stadion
19:30	Burgmeier 61'	BBC Report	Rubio 51'	Attendance: 1,322; Referee: Sinisa Zrnic

29 August 2002 Qualifying round	Livingston	0–0 (1–1 agg.)	(Liechtenstein) FC Vaduz	Almondvale Stadium
19:30		BBC Report		Attendance: 7,419; Referee: Ivan Novak
Note: 1–1 on aggregate. Livingston won on away goals.

19 September 2002 First round	(Austria) SK Sturm Graz	5–2	Livingston	Liebenauer Stadium
19:30	Wetl 37'; Szabics 50'; Dağ 51'; Mujiri 57', 58'	Uefa Report	Lovell 90'; Zárate 90'	Attendance: 2,785; Referee: Sergey Shebek

3 October 2002 First round	Livingston	4–3 (6–8 agg.)	(Austria) SK Sturm Graz	Almondvale Stadium
19:45	Wilson 31', 90'; Xausa 55'; Andrews 78'	BBC Report	Szabics 45', 54'; Mujiri 48'	Attendance: 5,208; Referee: Roy Olsen
Note: Sturm Graz won 8–6 on aggregate.

== Statistics ==
=== League table ===
Pos	Team	Pld	W	D	L	GF	GA	GD	Pts	Qualification or relegation (Note: Teams played each other three times (33 matches), before the league split into two groups (the top six and the bottom six) for the last five matches.)
7	Hibernian	38	15	6	17	56	64	−8	51	
8	Aberdeen	38	13	10	15	41	54	−13	49	
9	Livingston	38	9	8	21	48	62	−14	35	
10	Partick Thistle	38	8	11	19	37	58	−21	35	
11	Dundee United	38	7	11	20	35	68	−33	32	

Source: Scottish Professional Football League
Rules for classification: 1) Points; 2) Goal difference; 3) Goals scored
