= 2001–02 Livingston F.C. season =

Livingston
2001–02 season
- Manager: Jim Leishman
- Stadium: Almondvale Stadium
- SPL: Third place
- Scottish Cup: Fourth round
- League Cup: Quarter-final
- Top goalscorer: League: Barry Wilson & Rubio (8); All: Barry Wilson (11)
- Highest home attendance: 10,112, vs. Rangers, SPL, 27 October 2001
- Lowest home attendance: 1,896, vs. East Fife, League Cup, 26 September 2001
Home colours	Away colours

Season 2001-02 saw Livingston compete in the Scottish Premier League. They also competed in the League Cup and the Scottish Cup.

== Summary ==
In their first season in the Scottish Premier League having won promotion the previous season Livingston finished third. They reached the Quarter-final of the League Cup and the fourth round of the Scottish Cup being knocked out by Aberdeen.

== Results & fixtures ==
Win Draw Loss

=== Scottish Premier League ===
28 July 2001 1	Livingston	2–1	Heart of Midlothian	Almondvale Stadium
	Cabrera 34'; Fernández 63'	BBC Report	Cameron 89'	Attendance: 8,321; Referee: John Underhill

4 August 2001 2	Rangers	0–0	Livingston	Ibrox Stadium
		BBC Report		Attendance: 47,805; Referee: Alan Freeland

11 August 2001 3	Dundee	1–0	Livingston	Dens Park
	Sara	BBC Report		Attendance: 7,712; Referee: Michael McCurry

18 August 2001 4	Livingston	0–0	Celtic	Almondvale Stadium
		BBC Report		Attendance: 10,024; Referee: Hugh Dallas

25 August 2001 5	Motherwell	0–0	Livingston	Fir Park
		Motherwell Mad Report		Attendance: 4,828; Referee: Robert Orr

8 September 2001 6	Livingston	2–0	Dundee United	Almondvale Stadium
	Lowndes 57'; Lovell 84'	BBC Report		Attendance: 6,107; Referee: Tom Brown

15 September 2001 7	St Johnstone	2–2	Livingston	McDiarmid Park
	Falconer 16'; MacDonald 49'	BBC Report	Cabrera 25' (red card) 63'; Bingham 28'	Attendance: 3,817; Referee: Stuart Dougal

22 September 2001 8	Dunfermline Athletic	1–2	Livingston	East End Park
	Crawford 8'		Bingham 74'; Wilson 82'	Attendance: 4,516; Referee: Ian Fyfe

30 September 2001 9	Livingston	1–0	Hibernian	Almondvale Stadium
	Cabrera 64'	BBC Report		Attendance: 10,016; Referee: Robert Orr

13 October 2001 10	Livingston	2–2	Aberdeen	Almondvale Stadium
	Wilson 14 pen.' Tosh 52'	BBC Report	Mackie 59', 70'	Attendance: 6,393; Referee: Willie Young

20 October 2001 11	Kilmarnock	1–5	Livingston	Rugby Park
	Santini 5 o.g.'	BBC Report	Bingham 8'; Andrews 20'; Fernández 68'; Xausa 78'; Aurelio 90 pen.'	Attendance: 7,346; Referee: Alan Freeland

27 October 2001 12	Livingston	0–2	Rangers	Almondvale Stadium
		BBC Report	Reyna 24', 59'	Attendance: 10,112; Referee: John Underhill

3 November 2001 13	Heart of Midlothian	1–3	Livingston	Tynecastle Stadium
	McKenna 76'	BBC Report	Fernández 22', 25'; Wilson 72'	Attendance: 12,173; Referee: Kevin Toner

17 November 2001 14	Livingston	1–0	Dundee	Almondvale Stadium
	Wilson 57'			Attendance: 6,112; Referee: John Rowbotham

24 November 2001 15	Hibernian	0–3	Livingston	Easter Road
			Xausa 8', 34'; Lowndes 86'	Attendance: 11,146; Referee: Ian Fyfe

1 December 2001 16	Livingston	3–1	Motherwell	Almondvale Stadium
	Xausa 20', 40'; Hammell 23 o.g.'	BBC Report	McFadden 78'	Attendance: 5,426; Referee: Hugh Dallas

8 December 2001 17	Dundee United	0–0	Livingston	Tannadice Park
		BBC Report		Attendance: 6,312; Referee: Willie Young

15 December 2001 18	Livingston	2–1	St Johnstone	Almondvale Stadium
	Fernández 53'; Lowndes 80'	Livi Mad Report	Hartley 48'	Attendance: 4,563; Referee: Michael McCurry

22 December 2001 19	Livingston	0–0	Dunfermline Athletic	Almondvale Stadium
		Livi Mad Report		Attendance: 5,326; Referee: Robert Orr

26 December 2001 20	Celtic	3–2	Livingston	Celtic Park
	Moravčík 12'; Larsson 50', 90'	BBC Report	Rubio 37'; Cabrera 58'	Attendance: 58,507; Referee: Gary Mitchell

29 December 2001 21	Livingston	0–1	Kilmarnock	Almondvale Stadium
		Livi Mad Report	Rubio 35 o.g.'	Attendance: 5,214; Referee: Willie Young

2 January 2002 22	Aberdeen	0–3	Livingston	Pittodrie Stadium
		Livi Mad Report	Tosh 38'; Brinquin 57'; Andrews 67'	Attendance: 15,709; Referee: David Somers

12 January 2002 23	Rangers	3–0	Livingston	Ibrox Stadium
	Flo 30'; Caniggia 34', 86'	Livi Mad Report		Attendance: 48,044; Referee: Hugh Dallas

19 January 2002 24	Livingston	2–0	Heart of Midlothian	Almondvale Stadium
	Bingham 53'; Fernández 65'	BBC Report	Maybury (red card) 33'	Attendance: 9,150; Referee: Dougie McDonald

30 January 2002 25	Livingston	1–3	Celtic	Almondvale Stadium
	Cabrera 5'	BBC Report	Moravčík 58'; Larsson 60'; Hartson 72'	Attendance: 8,437; Referee: Dougie McDonald

2 February 2002 26	Motherwell	1–2	Livingston	Fir Park
	Soloy 38'	BBC Report	Andrews 45'; Cabrera 71'	Attendance: 4,458; Referee: Michael McCurry

9 February 2002 27	Livingston	1–1	Dundee United	Almondvale Stadium
	Bingham 52'	Livi Mad Report	Lilley 85'	Attendance: 4,720; Referee: David Somers

16 February 2002 28	St Johnstone	3–0	Livingston	McDiarmid Park
	Hartley 44'; Parker 80'; Jones 90'	Livi Mad Report		Attendance: 3,784; Referee: Charlie Richmond

2 March 2002 29	Dunfermline Athletic	1–0	Livingston	East End Park
	Bullen 51'	BBC Report		Attendance: 4,500; Referee: Hugh Dallas

9 March 2002 30	Livingston	0–3	Hibernian	Almondvale Stadium
		Livi Mad Report	O'Connor 15'; O'Neil 45'; Petersen 78 o.g.'	Attendance: 6,463; Referee: Kevin Toner

13 March 2002 31	Dundee	2–0	Livingston	Dens Park
	Sara 57', 90'	BBC Report		Attendance: 5,506; Referee: John Rowbotham

16 March 2002 32	Kilmarnock	1–1	Livingston	Rugby Park
	Dargo 36'	Livi Mad Report	Wilson 22'	Attendance: 6,936; Referee: Dougie McDonald

23 March 2002 33	Livingston	0–0	Aberdeen	Almondvale Stadium
		BBC Report		Attendance: 9,449; Referee: Kenny Clark

6 April 2002 34	Celtic	5–1	Livingston	Celtic Park
	Larsson 3', 34', 59'; Hartson 19', 25'	BBC Report	Wilson 71'	Attendance: 59,752; Referee: Willie Young

13 April 2002 35	Livingston	2–1	Rangers	Almondvale Stadium
	Wilson 42'; Lovell 87'	Livi Mad Report	Amoruso 3'	Attendance: 10,019; Referee: Stuart Dougal

20 April 2002 36	Aberdeen	3–0	Livingston	Pittodrie Stadium
	Mike 7'; McGuire 10'; Mackie 39'	BBC Report		Attendance: 14,109; Referee: Dougie McDonald

28 April 2002 37	Livingston	4–1	Dunfermline Athletic	Almondvale Stadium
	Lovell 34'; Xausa 61', 76'; Cabrera 83'	Livi Mad Report	Dair 41'	Attendance: 8,749; Referee: Michael McCurry

12 May 2002 38	Heart of Midlothian	2–3	Livingston	Tynecastle Stadium
	Fuller 49' Fulton 88 pen.'	BBC Report	Cabrera 52' Bingham 70' Wilson 85'	Attendance: 10,223; Referee: Hugh Dallas

=== Scottish League Cup ===
26 September 2001 Second round	Livingston	3–0	East Fife	Almondvale Stadium
19:45	Caputo 3', 17'; Tosh 85'			Attendance: 1,896; Referee: Cammy Melville

9 October 2001 Third round	Aberdeen	1–6	Livingston	Pittodrie Stadium
19:45	Mackie 51'		Wilson 10', 33'; Caputo 12', 29'; Lovell 56'; Bingham 58'	Attendance: 8,599; Referee: Garry Mitchell

19 December 2001 Quarter-final	Livingston	0–2	Celtic	Almondvale Stadium
19:45		Livi Mad Report	Baldé 35'; Hartson 85'	Attendance: 9,146; Referee: Kenny Clark

=== Scottish Cup ===
14 January 2002 Third round	Albion Rovers	1–4	Livingston	Cliftonhill
19:30	McLean 43'	Livi Mad Report	Wilson 1'; Bingham 30', 89'; Fernández 83'	Attendance: 2,234; Referee: George Clyde

26 January 2002 Fourth round	Aberdeen	2–0	Livingston	Pittodrie Stadium
15:00	Winters 6'; McAllister 18'	Livi Mad Report		Attendance: 10,261; Referee: John Underhill

== Player statistics ==
As of 12 May 2002 (UTC)

No.	Pos	Nat	Player	Total		SPL		League Cup		Scottish Cup	
No.	Pos	Nat	Player	Apps	Goals	Apps	Goals	Apps	Goals	Apps	Goals
1	GK	(Spain) ESP	Javier Sánchez Broto	18	0	17+0	0	1+0	0	0+0	0
2	DF	(France) FRA	Philippe Brinquin	26	1	23+0	1	1+0	0	2+0	0
3	DF	(Scotland) SCO	Gary Bollan	25	0	20+1	0	2+0	0	2+0	0
4	DF	(Spain) ESP	Rubio	37	1	33+0	1	2+0	0	2+0	0
5	DF	(Trinidad and Tobago) TRI	Marvin Andrews	35	3	33+0	3	2+0	0	0+0	0
6	DF	(Scotland) SCO	Paul Deas	2	0	1+0	0	1+0	0	0+0	0
6	DF	(Scotland) SCO	John Anderson	16	0	12+1	0	1+0	0	2+0	0
7	MF	(Scotland) SCO	Barry Wilson	42	11	32+5	8	3+0	2	2+0	1
8	MF	(Scotland) SCO	Steve Tosh	35	3	21+10	2	2+0	1	2+0	0
9	FW	(England) ENG	Nathan Lowndes	25	3	7+14	3	0+2	0	0+2	0
10	FW	(Spain) ESP	David Fernández	36	7	30+3	6	1+0	0	2+0	1
11	FW	(Scotland) SCO	David Bingham	42	9	31+6	6	3+0	1	2+0	2
12	MF	(Spain) ESP	Quino Cabrera	41	8	34+2	8	3+0	0	2+0	0
13	MF	(Canada) CAN	Davide Xausa	30	7	19+9	7	1+1	0	0+0	0
14	MF	(England) ENG	Lee Makel	13	0	9+4	0	0+0	0	0+0	0
15	DF	(Argentina) ARG	Carlos Aurelio	17	1	5+9	1	1+1	0	0+1	0
16	GK	(England) ENG	Nick Culkin	25	0	21+0	0	2+0	0	2+0	0
17	MF	(Australia) AUS	Stuart Lovell	28	4	26+1	3	1+0	1	0+0	0
18	GK	(Scotland) SCO	David McEwan	1	0	0+1	0	0+0	0	0+0	0
19	FW	(Scotland) SCO	Marino Keith	2	0	0+1	0	0+1	0	0+0	0
21	DF	(Scotland) SCO	Michael Hart	25	0	14+7	0	2+0	0	2+0	0
22	FW	(Denmark) DEN	Nocko Joković	3	0	0+3	0	0+0	0	0+0	0
24	DF	(Italy) ITA	Simone Del Nero	1	0	0+1	0	0+0	0	0+0	0
25	FW	(Italy) ITA	Massimiliano Caputo	23	4	4+17	0	2+0	4	0+0	0
26	MF	(Scotland) SCO	Darren Brady	1	0	0+0	0	0+1	0	0+0	0
28	DF	(France) FRA	Didier Santini	22	0	21+0	0	1+0	0	0+0	0
32	FW	(Republic of Ireland) IRL	Vinny Sullivan	1	0	0+0	0	0+1	0	0+0	0
37	MF	(Scotland) SCO	Richard Brittain	3	0	0+2	0	0+0	0	0+1	0
91	MF	(Togo) TOG	Chérif Touré Mamam	10	0	3+6	0	1+0	0	0+0	0
	DF	(Denmark) DEN	Morten Petersen	3	0	2+1	0	0+0	0	0+0	0

== Team Statistics ==
=== League table ===
Pos	Team	Pld	W	D	L	GF	GA	GD	Pts	Qualification or relegation (Note: Teams played each other three times (33 matches), before the league split into two groups (the top six and the bottom six) for the last five matches.)
1	Celtic (C)	38	33	4	1	94	18	+76	103	Qualification for the Champions League third qualifying round
2	Rangers	38	25	10	3	82	27	+55	85	Qualification for the UEFA Cup first round
3	Livingston	38	16	10	12	50	47	+3	58	Qualification for the UEFA Cup qualifying round (Note: As both finalists of the 2001–02 Scottish Cup, Rangers and Celtic, qualified for European competition via their league position, the cup berth for 2002–03 UEFA Cup was passed to the next-placed team in the league, fourth-placed Aberdeen.)
4	Aberdeen	38	16	7	15	51	49	+2	55	Qualification for the UEFA Cup qualifying round
5	Heart of Midlothian	38	14	6	18	52	57	−5	48	

Source: Scottish Professional Football League
Rules for classification: (1) Points; (2) Goal difference; (3) Goals scored
(C) Champions
