= 2003–04 Livingston F.C. season =

Livingston
2003–04 season
- Manager: Márcio Máximo (until 14 October); David Hay
- Stadium: Almondvale Stadium
- SPL: Ninth place
- Scottish Cup: Semi-final
- League Cup: Winners
- Top goalscorer: League: Derek Lilley (12); All: Derek Lilley (18)
- Highest home attendance: 9,627, vs. Rangers, SPL, 25 October 2003
- Lowest home attendance: 2,675, vs. Montrose, Scottish Cup, 10 January 2004
Home colours	Away colours

Season 2003-04 saw Livingston compete in the Scottish Premier League. They also reached the semi-finals of the Scottish Cup and won the League Cup.

== Summary ==
Livingston finished 9th in the Scottish Premier League during Season 2003–04. They went on to win League Cup after defeating Hibernian in the final, and reached the semi-final of the Scottish Cup losing to Celtic.

=== Management ===
Livingston started the season under Márcio Máximo who had been appointed during the summer. On 14 October 2003 he resigned as manager and was replaced by David Hay who led the club to their League Cup win.

== Fixtures and results ==
Win Draw Loss

=== Scottish Premier League ===
9 August 2003 1	Partick Thistle	1 – 1	Livingston	Firhill Stadium
15:00	Milne 31'	BBC Report	Pasquinelli 77'	Attendance: 4,220; Referee: Dougie McDonald

16 August 2003 2	Livingston	1 – 0	Motherwell	Almondvale Stadium
15:00	Lilley 78'	BBC Report		Attendance: 5,316; Referee: Craig Thomson

23 August 2003 3	Dundee	2 – 1	Livingston	Dens Park
15:00	Novo 17', 84'	BBC Report	O'Brien 37'	Attendance: 5,815; Referee: Mike McCurry

30 August 2003 4	Celtc	5 – 1	Livingston	Celtic Park
15:00	Larsson 25', 56', 77'; Maloney 39'; Thompson 90'	BBC Report	Lilley 85'	Attendance: 57,165; Referee: Willie Young

13 September 2003 5	Livingston	0 – 0	Dundee United	Almondvale Stadium
15:00		BBC Report		Attendance: 5,344; Referee: Steve Conroy

20 September 2003 6	Livingston	1 – 2	Kilmarnock	Almondvale Stadium
15:00	Makel 18'	BBC Report	Hessey 15'; Boyd 22'	Attendance: 6,150; Referee: John Rowbotham

27 September 2003 7	Aberdeen	0 – 3	Livingston	Pittodrie Stadium
15:00		BBC Report	Quino 45'; Rubio 65'; Pasquinelli 70'	Attendance: 10,307; Referee: Dougie McDonald

4 October 2003 8	Livingston	0 – 0	Dunfermline Athletic	Almondvale Stadium
15:00		BBC Report		Attendance: 4,816; Referee: Ian Fyfe

18 October 2003 9	Hibernian	0 – 2	Livingston	Easter Road
15:00		BBC Report	Lilley 38', 83'	Attendance: 8,562; Referee: Craig Thomson

25 October 2003 10	Livingston	0 – 0	Rangers	Almondvale Stadium
15:00		BBC Report		Attendance: 9,627; Referee: Hugh Dallas

1 November 2003 11	Heart of Midlothian	3 – 1	Livingston	Tynecastle Park
15:00	Kirk 74', 85' Pressley 92 pen.'	Livi Mad Report	Lilley 51'	Attendance: 11,233; Referee: Stuart Dougal

8 November 2003 12	Livingston	2 – 0	Partick Thistle	Almondvale Stadium
15:00	Lilley 26 pen.' Makel 45'	BBC Report		Attendance: 5,226; Referee: Chris Foy

22 November 2003 13	Motherwell	1 – 1	Livingston	Fir Park
15:00	Clarkson 28'	BBC Report	Lilley 39'	Attendance: 6,357; Referee: John Underhill

29 November 2003 14	Livingston	1 – 1	Dundee	Almondvale Stadium
15:00	Lilley 71 pen.'	BBC Report	Fotheringham 84'	Attendance: 4,625; Referee: John Rowbotham

6 December 2003 15	Livingston	0 – 2	Celtic	Almondvale Stadium
15:00		BBC Report	Sutton 48'; Thompson 85'	Attendance: 9,523; Referee: Hugh Dallas

13 December 2003 16	Dundee United	2 – 0	Livingston	Tannadice Park
15:00	Dodds 41', 80'	BBC Report		Attendance: 5,421; Referee: Dougie McDonald

20 December 2003 17	Kilmarnock	0 – 3	Livingston	Rugby Park
15:00		BBC Report	Juanjo 50'; Pasquinelli 80'; O'Brien 90'	Attendance: 5,035; Referee: Charlie Richmond

27 December 2003 18	Livingston	1– 1	Aberdeen	Almondvale Stadium
15:00	O'Brien 90'	BBC Report	Booth 23'	Attendance: 7,115; Referee: Kenny Clark

3 January 2004 19	Dunfermline Athletic	2 – 2	Livingston	East End Park
15:00	Nicholson 36 pen.' Crawford 85'	BBC Report	McNamee 15'; Makel 62'	Attendance: 5,155; Referee: Mike McCurry

17 January 2004 20	Livingston	1 – 0	Hibernian	Almondvale Stadium
15:00	Makel 26'	BBC Report		Attendance: 5,621; Referee: John Underhill

24 January 2004 21	Rangers	1 – 0	Livingston	Ibrox Stadium
15:00	Nerlinger 13'	BBC Report		Attendance: 48,638; Referee: Iain Brines

11 February 2004 22	Partick Thistle	5 – 2	Livingston	Firhill Stadium
19:30	Grady 10'; Britton 41', 73'; McNamee 68 o.g.' Thomson 82'	BBC Report	Makel 85'; McMenamin 90'	Attendance: 3,011; Referee: Dougie McDonald

14 February 2004 23	Livingston	3 – 1	Motherwell	Almondvale Stadium
15:00	McAllister 3'; Lilley 29'; Fernández 45'	Livi Mad Report	Adams 90'	Attendance: 3,492; Referee: Chris Foy

21 February 2004 24	Dundee	1 – 0	Livingston	Dens Park
15:00	Milne 59'	BBC Report		Attendance: 6,108; Referee: Kevin Toner

24 February 2004 25	Livingston	2 – 3	Heart of Midlothian	Almondvale Stadium
19:45	Makel 4' McMenamin 56'	BBC Report	De Vries 25' Kirk 47' McKenna 84'	Attendance: 4,450; Referee: Ian Fyfye

29 February 2004 26	Celtic	5 – 1		Celtic Park
12:30	Pearson 12'; Sutton 36'; Thompson 48', 80'; Larsson 55'	BBC Report	Lilley 41'	Attendance: 57,973; Referee: Stuart Dougal

21 March 2004 27	Aberdeen	1– 2	Livingston	Pittodrie Stadium
12:15	Hinds 84'	BBC Report	McMenamin 14'; O'Brien 87'	Attendance: 7,477; Referee: Mike McCurry

24 March 2004 28	Livingston	2 – 3	Dundee United	Almondvale Stadium
19:45	McNamee 38'; McLaughlin 72'	BBC Report	Scotland 13'; Samuel 79'; McIntyre 82'	Attendance: 3,082; Referee: Charlie Richmond

27 March 2004 29	Livingston	0 – 0	Dunfermline Athletic	Almondvale Stadium
15:00		BBC Report		Attendance: 3,558; Referee: Iain Brines

3 April 2004 30	Hibernian	3 – 1	Livingston	Easter Road
15:00	McManus 39'; Riordan 54', 83'	BBC Report	Lilley 50'	Attendance: 6,507; Referee: Hugh Dallas

7 April 2004 31	Livingston	1 – 1	Kilmarnock	Almondvale Stadium
19:45	Fernández 83'	Livi Mad Report	Dargo 85'	Attendance: 2,677; Referee: Mike Ritchie

14 April 2004 32	Livingston	1 – 1	Rangers	Almondvale Stadium
19:45	McMenamin 79'	BBC Report	Mols 25'	Attendance: 6,596; Referee: Willie Young

17 April 2004 33	Heart of Midlothan	1 – 1	Livingston	Tynecastle Stadium
15:00	McKenna 18'	BBC Report	McMenamin 73'	Attendance: 10,352; Referee: John Underhill

24 April 2004 34	Livingston	2 – 0	Aberdeen	Almondvale Stadium
15:00	McNamee 24'; McMenamin 63'	BBC Report		Attendance: 3,133; Referee: Craig Thomson

1 May 2004 35	Kilmarnock	4 – 2	Livingston	Rugby Park
15:00	Nish 54', 79'; Canning 74'; McSwegan 87'	BBC Report	Makel 13'; O'Brien 23'	Attendance: 5,023; Referee: John Rowbotham

9 May 2004 36	Livingston	2 – 2	Partick Thistle	Almondvale Stadium
15:00	O'Brien 22'; McMenamin 68'	BBC Report	Madaschi 5'; Grady 63'	Attendance: 3,160; Referee: Willie Young

12 May 2004 37	Dundee	2 – 0	Livingston	Dens Park
19:30	Novo 5', 90 pen.'	Livi Mad Report		Attendance: 4,954; Referee: Calum Murray

15 May 2004 38	Livingston	4 – 1	Hibernian	Almondvale Stadium
15:00	Lovell 8'; Lilley 64'; Fernández 78'; Makel 89'	BBC Report	Doumbe 75'	Attendance: 4,409; Referee: Mike McCurry

=== Scottish League Cup ===
23 September 2003 Second round	Queen's Park	1 – 3	Livingston	Hampden Park
19:45	Clark 89'	Livi Mad Report	Makel 9' (79); Quino 40'	Attendance: 1,011; Referee: John Underhill

29 October 2003 Third round	Dundee United	0 – 1	Livingston	Tannadice Park
19:30		BBC Report	Gallacher 19 o.g.'	Attendance: 2,899; Referee: Willie Young

2 December 2003 Quarter-final	Aberdeen	2 – 3 (a.e.t.)	Livingston	Pittodrie Stadium
19:45	Tosh 34', 59' 59'	Livi Mad Report	Lilley 15'; Pasquinelli 50'; Makel 99'	Attendance: 6,090; Referee: Stuart Dougal

3 February 2004 Semi-final	Dundee	0 – 1	Livingston	Dens Park
19:45		Livi Mad Report	Lilley 90' (pen.)	Attendance: 6,600; Referee: Mike McCurry

14 March 2004 Final	Hibernian	0 – 2	Livingston	Hampden Park
15:00		BBC Report	Lilley 50'; McAllister 52'	Attendance: 45,500; Referee: Willie Young

=== Scottish Cup ===
10 January 2004 Third round	Livingston	1 – 0	Montrose	Almondvale Stadium
15:00	Fernández 17'	Livi Mad Report		Attendance: 2,675; Referee: Craig MacKay

8 February 2004 Fourth round	The Spartans	0 – 4	Livingston	City Park
15:00		Livi Mad Report	Lilley 53', 61', 70'; Fernández 59'	Attendance: 3,123; Referee: Craig Thompson

6 March 2004 Quarter-final	Aberdeen	1 – 1	Livingston	Pittodrie Stadium
15:00	Muirhead 57'	Livi Mad Report	Anderson 51 o.g.'	Attendance: 11,593; Referee: Dougie McDonald

18 March 2004 Quarter-final replay	Livingston	1 – 0	Aberdeen	Almondvale Stadium
15:00	O'Brien 26'	Livi Mad Report		Attendance: 4,485; Referee: Dougie McDonald

11 April 2004 Semi-final	Livingston	1 – 3	Celtic	Hampden Park
15:00	McMenamin 79'	Report	Sutton 37', 65'; Larsson 50'	Attendance: 26,152; Referee: Kenny Clark

== Statistics ==
=== League table ===
Pos	Team	Pld	W	D	L	GF	GA	GD	Pts	Qualification or relegation (Note: Teams played each other three times (33 matches), before the league split into two groups (the top six and the bottom six) for the last five matches.)
7	Dundee	38	12	10	16	48	57	−9	46	
8	Hibernian	38	11	11	16	41	60	−19	44	Qualification for the UEFA Intertoto Cup second round (Note: Hibernian qualified for the 2004 UEFA Intertoto Cup as the highest placed team to apply to participate in the competition.)
9	Livingston	38	10	13	15	48	57	−9	43	
10	Kilmarnock	38	12	6	20	51	74	−23	42	
11	Aberdeen	38	9	7	22	39	63	−24	34	

Source: Scottish Professional Football League
Rules for classification: 1) Points; 2) Goal difference; 3) Goals scored
