= 2004–05 Partick Thistle F.C. season =

Partick Thistle
2004–05 season
- Scottish First Division: 9th
- Scottish Cup: Third round
- Scottish League Cup: Third round
- Scottish Challenge Cup: Quarter Final

The 2004–05 season saw Partick Thistle compete in the Scottish First Division where they finished in 9th position with 39 points, suffering relegation to the Scottish Second Division.

== Results ==
Partick Thistle's score comes first

=== Legend ===
Win	Draw	Loss

=== Scottish First Division ===
Match	Date	Opponent	Venue	Result	Attendance	Scorers
1	7 August 2004	Clyde	A	1–2	3,800	Ramon
2	14 August 2004	Airdrie United	H	3–2	4,011	Ramon, Hinds, Mitchell
3	21 August 2004	Hamilton Academical	A	1–0	3,543	Ramon
4	28 August 2004	Ross County	A	1–0	2,781	Hinds
5	4 September 2004	Falkirk	H	1–4	5,157	Panther
6	11 September 2004	St Mirren	A	1–2	4,771	Ramon
7	11 September 2004	Queen of the South	H	1–2	3,233	Ramon
8	25 September 2004	St Johnstone	A	1–2	2,763	Milne
9	2 October 2004	Raith Rovers	H	2–0	3,059	Panther, Oné
10	16 October 2004	Airdrie United	A	2–4	2,548	Madaschi, Ramon
11	23 October 2004	Clyde	H	0–0	4,026	
12	30 October 2004	Ross County	H	4–0	2,898	Ramon (2), Madaschi, Oné
13	13 November 2004	St Mirren	H	0–3	4,949	
14	20 November 2004	Queen of the South	A	0–1	2,221	
15	23 November 2004	Falkirk	A	0–3	3,335	
16	27 November 2004	Raith Rovers	A	0–0	2,445	
17	4 December 2004	St Johnstone	H	0–4	2,945	
18	11 December 2004	Clyde	A	1–1	1,800	Wilkinson
19	18 December 2004	Hamilton Academical	A	0–1	3,051	
20	27 December 2004	Ross County	A	1–2	3,112	Ramon
21	29 December 2004	Falkirk	H	2–1	4,120	Oné (2)
22	1 January 2005	St Mirren	A	1–1	3,779	Fleming
23	15 January 2005	Queen of the South	H	3–1	3,257	Oné, Paton (o.g.), Craig (o.g.)
24	22 January 2005	St Johnstone	A	1–1	2,814	Ramon
25	29 January 2005	Raith Rovers	H	4–1	3,141	Ross, Oné, McConalogue
26	12 February 2005	Airdrie United	H	1–1	3,791	Fleming
27	19 February 2005	Hamilton Academical	A	0–1	3,128	
28	5 March 2005	Falkirk	A	1–2	4,157	Murray
29	12 March 2005	Ross County	H	0–0	2,939	
30	19 March 2005	St Mirren	H	0–0	3,730	
31	2 April 2005	Queen of the South	A	1–3	2,589	McConalogue
32	9 April 2005	Raith Rovers	A	1–2	1,403	Ramon
33	16 April 2005	St Johnstone	H	0–4	2,334	
34	23 April 2005	Clyde	H	1–0	2,644	McConalogue
35	30 April 2005	Airdrie United	A	1–0	1,747	Hinds
36	7 May 2005	Hamilton Academical	H	1–1	2,806	Lumsden (o.g.)

=== Scottish Cup ===
Match	Date	Opponent	Venue	Result	Attendance	Scorers
R3	8 January 2005	Heart of Midlothian	H	0–0	5,666	
R3 Replay	19 January 2005	Heart of Midlothian	A	1–2	7,340	Oné

=== Scottish League Cup ===
Match	Date	Opponent	Venue	Result	Attendance	Scorers
R2	24 August 2004	Stenhousemuir	A	5–2	1,562	Gibson, Ramon, Fleming, Hinds (2)
R3	22 September 2004	Dunfermline Athletic	A	1–3	2,301	Dowie

=== Scottish Challenge Cup ===
Match	Date	Opponent	Venue	Result	Attendance	Scorers
R1	31 July 2004	Brechin City	H	3–0	1,803	Ramon (2), Billy Gibson
R2	31 August 2004	Albion Rovers	A	2–1	1,050	Hinds, Panther
QF	15 September 2004	Ross County	H	1 – 1 (3 – 5 pens)	1,050	Panther

== Squad statistics ==
Pos.	Name	League		FA Cup		League Cup		Other		Total	
Pos.	Name	Apps	Goals	Apps	Goals	Apps	Goals	Apps	Goals	Apps	Goals
GK	(Scotland) Kenny Arthur	34	0	2	0	2	0	2	0	40	0
GK	(England) Neil Bennett	21	0	3	0	0	0	0	0	24	0
GK	(Scotland) Steven Pinkowski	0	0	0	0	0	0	1	0	1	0
DF	(France) Jean-Yves Anis	14(2)	0	2	0	0(2)	0	1	0	17(4)	0
DF	(Scotland) Andy Dowie	26(1)	0	1(1)	0	2	1	2	0	31(2)	1
DF	(Scotland) Jimmy Gibson	11(2)	0	1(1)	0	0	0	0	0	12(3)	0
DF	(Australia) Adrian Madaschi	26(1)	2	2	0	1	0	1	0	30(1)	2
DF	(Scotland) Kenny Milne	25(4)	1	2	0	2	0	1	0	30(4)	1
DF	(Scotland) Grant Murray	31(1)	1	2	0	2	0	3	0	38(1)	1
DF	(Scotland) Scott Paterson	1	0	0	0	0	0	0	0	1	0
DF	(England) Andy Wilkinson	9(3)	1	0	0	2	0	1(2)	0	12(5)	1
MF	(Scotland) Darren Brady	10(1)	0	0	0	0	0	0	0	10(1)	0
MF	(Scotland) Ian Cameron	0(2)	0	0	0	0	0	0	0	0(2)	0
MF	(Scotland) Derek Fleming	32(2)	2	2	0	2	1	3	0	39(2)	3
MF	(Scotland) Steve Fulton	16(3)	0	0(2)	0	1(1)	0	2	0	19(6)	0
MF	(Scotland) Billy Gibson	21(5)	0	1(1)	0	1	1	3	1	26(6)	2
MF	(Scotland) Willie Howie	4(3)	0	0	0	1(1)	0	2(1)	0	7(5)	0
MF	(Scotland) Jamie Mitchell	17(3)	1	1	0	0	0	1(1)	0	19(4)	1
MF	(Scotland) Manny Panther	6(7)	2	0	0	2	0	2(1)	2	10(8)	4
MF	(Scotland) Andy Ross	11(4)	1	0	0	0	1(1)	0	0	12(5)	1
MF	(Scotland) Ian Ross	6	0	0	0	0	0	0	0	6	0
MF	(Scotland) Adam Strachan	6(7)	0	1	0	0	0	0(1)	0	7(8)	0
FW	(Scotland) Gerry Britton	0(1)	0	0	0	0	0	0	0	0(1)	0
FW	(England) Leigh Hinds	24(11)	3	0	0	2	2	2	1	28(11)	5
FW	(Scotland) Stephen McConalogue	8(3)	4	0	0	0	0	0	0	8(3)	4
FW	(Scotland) Andy McLaren	5(4)	0	0	0	0	0	0	0	5(4)	0
FW	(France) Armand Oné	15(12)	6	2	1	0(2)	0	2	0	19(14)	7
FW	(Spain) Juan Ramon	27(3)	11	2	0	2	1	2	2	33(3)	14

== League table ==
Pos	Team	Pld	W	D	L	GF	GA	GD	Pts	Promotion or relegation
6	Ross County	36	13	8	15	40	37	+3	47	
7	Hamilton Academical	36	12	11	13	35	36	−1	47	
8	St Johnstone	36	12	10	14	38	39	−1	46	
9	Partick Thistle (R)	36	10	9	17	38	52	−14	39	Relegation to the Second Division
10	Raith Rovers (R)	36	3	7	26	26	67	−41	16	Relegation to the Second Division

Source: "2004-2005 First Division - SPFL Archive". SPFL (in Malay).
Rules for classification: 1) points; 2) goal difference; 3) number of goals scored.
(R) Relegated
