= 2004–05 Livingston F.C. season =

Livingston
2004–05 season
- Manager: Allan Preston (until 5 November); Alec Cleland (interim); Richard Gough (from 30 November)
- Stadium: Almondvale Stadium
- SPL: Tenth place
- Scottish Cup: Quarter-final
- League Cup: Quarter-final
- Top goalscorer: League: Burton O'Brien (8); All: Burton O'Brien (8)
- Highest home attendance: 8,968, vs. Dundee, SPL, 21 May 2005
- Lowest home attendance: 1,736, vs. Dundee, League Cup, 21 September 2004
Home colours	Away colours

Season 2004-05 saw Livingston compete in the Scottish Premier League. They also competed in the League Cup and the Scottish Cup.

== Summary ==
Livingston finished third bottom of the SPL in 10th place and reached the Quarter Finals of both the Scottish Cup and League Cup.

=== Management ===
Livingston started the season under Allan Preston who was sacked by the club on 5 November 2004 with Richard Gough being appointed as his replacement on 30 November.

== Results & fixtures ==
Win Draw Loss

=== Scottish Premier League ===
7 August 2004 1	Livingston	3 – 0	Inverness CT	Almondvale Stadium
15:00	O'Brien 44'; Easton 57'; Lovell 66'	BBC Report		Attendance: 3,310; Referee: Richmond

14 August 2004 2	Rangers	4 – 0	Livingston	Ibrox Stadium
15:00	Pršo 6'; Hughes 32', 78'; Arveladze 88'	BBC Report		Attendance: 48,102; Referee: Brines

21 August 2004 3	Livingston	1 – 1	Dundee United	Almondvale Stadium
15:00	McMenamin 84'	BBC Report	Dodds 61' (pen.)	Attendance: 3,659; Referee: Young

28 August 2004 4	Aberdeen	2 – 0	Livingston	Pittodrie Stadium
15:00	Craig 65' (pen.), 68'	BBC Report		Attendance: 13,888; Referee: McCurry

11 September 2004 5	Livingston	0 – 2	Kilmarnock	Almondvale Stadium
15:00		BBC Report	Lilley 60'; Invincibile 72'	Attendance: 3,106; Referee: Clark

18 September 2004 6	Dundee	0 – 0	Livingston	Dens Park
15:00		BBC Report		Attendance: 4,387; Referee: Dallas

25 September 2004 7	Livingston	2 – 3	Motherwell	Almondvale Stadium
15:00	O'Brien 37'; Hamilton 45'	BBC Report	McBride 11'; McDonald 50'; Foran 71'	Attendance: 4,050; Referee: Thomson

3 October 2004 8	Heart of Midlothian	0 – 0	Livingston	Tynecastle Stadium
15:00		BBC Report		Attendance: 10,646; Referee: Richmond

16 October 2004 9	Livingston	2 – 0	Dunfermline Athletic	Almondvale Stadium
15:00	Wilson 5' (Own Goal); Snodgrass 41'	BBC Report		Attendance: 2,815; Referee: McDonald

24 October 2004 10	Livingston	2 – 4	Celtic	Almondvale Stadium
15:00	O'Brien 45', 53'	BBC Report	Petrov 2'; Camara 14'; Hartson 19'; Sutton 32'	Attendance: 7,695; Referee: Freeland

27 October 2004 11	Hibernian	2 – 1	Livingston	Easter Road
15:00	Beuzelin 9'; Fletcher 23'	BBC Report	Lilley 65' (pen.)	Attendance: 9,534; Referee: Dallas

30 October 2004 12	Inverness CT	2 – 0	Livingston	Caledonian Stadium
15:00	Bayne 39'; Wilson 87'	BBC Report		Attendance: 1,279; Referee: McCurry

7 November 2004 13	Livingston	1 – 4	Rangers	Almondvale Stadium
15:00	Easton 61'	BBC Report	Løvenkrands 37', 55'; Novo 67'; Thompson; Namouchi 84'	Attendance: 8,780; Referee: McDonald

13 November 2004 14	Dundee United	1 – 0	Livingston	Tannadice
15:00	McCracken 78'	Livi Mad Report		Attendance: 5,507; Referee: MacKay

20 November 2004 15	Livingston	0 – 2	Aberdeen	Almondvale Stadium
15:00		BBC Report	Foster 1'; Mackie 22'	Attendance: 4,569; Referee: Underhill

27 November 2004 16	Kilmarnock	1 – 3	Livingston	Rugby Park
15:00	Johnston 25'	BBC Report	Hamilton 7', 40'; O'Brien 60'	Attendance: 5,389; Referee: Freeland

4 December 2004 17	Livingston	1 – 0	Dundee	Almondvale Stadium
15:00	McPake 24'	BBC Report		Attendance: 4,509; Referee: Fyfe

11 December 2004 18	Motherwell	2 – 0	Livingston	Fir Park
15:00	O'Donnell 17'; Foran 47'	BBC Report		Attendance: 4,363; Referee: Ritchie

27 December 2004 19	Dunfermline Athletic	0 – 0	Livingston	East End Park
15:00		BBC Report		Attendance: 5,092; Referee: Murray

2 January 2005 20	Celtic	2 – 1	Livingston	Celtic Park
15:00	Hartson 15'; Sutton 57' (pen.)	BBC Report	Hamilton 39'	Attendance: 57,593; Referee: Thomson

15 January 2005 21	Livingston	0 – 2	Hibernian	Almondvale Stadium
15:00		BBC Report	O'Connor 53'; Riordan 74'	Attendance: 6,788; Referee: McCurry

22 January 2005 22	Livingston	1 – 4	Inverness CT	Almondvale Stadium
15:00	Horvath 43'	BBC Report	Hart 8'; Duncan 39'; Bayne 50'; Juanjo 73'	Attendance: 4,106; Referee: Smith

25 January 2005 23	Livingston	1 – 2	Heart of Midlothian	Almondvale Stadium
19:45	Lilley 74'	BBC Report	Hartley 85'; Miller 86'	Attendance: 4,318; Referee: Clark

29 January 2005 24	Rangers	3 – 0	Livingston	Ibrox Stadium
15:00	Pršo 14'; Ricksen 63'; Novo 68'	BBC Report		Attendance: 48,579; Referee: Toner

12 February 2005 25	Livingston	0 – 2	Dundee United	Almondvale Stadium
15:00		BBC Report	Crawford 14'; Grady 41'	Attendance: 5,158; Referee: Richmond

19 February 2005 26	Aberdeen	2 – 0	Livingston	Pittodrie Stadium
15:00	McNaughton 45'; Whelan 59'	BBC Report		Attendance: 9,214; Referee: Rowbotham

2 March 2005 27	Livingston	3 – 1	Kilmarnock	Almondvale Stadium
15:00	Horvath 36'; McNamee 64'; Snodgrass 83'	BBC Report	Johnston 13'	Attendance: 2,536; Referee: Brines

5 March 2005 28	Dundee	0 – 1	Livingston	Dens Park
15:00		BBC Report	O'Brien 49'	Attendance: 5,830; Referee: McCurry

12 March 2005 29	Livingston	1 – 1	Motherwell	Almondvale Stadium
15:00	Craigan 81' (Own Goal)	BBC Report	Scott McDonald 19'	Attendance: 4,609; Referee: MacDonald

19 March 2005 30	Heart of Midlothian	3 – 1	Livingston	Tynecastle Stadium
15:00	Miller 22' Burchill 65' Neilson 68'	BBC Report	Dair 45'	Attendance: 9,187; Referee: Clark

2 April 2005 31	Livingston	1 – 1	Dunfermline Athletic	Almondvale Stadium
15:00	Kachloul 78'	BBC Report	Hunt 79'	Attendance: 4,573; Referee: Winter

13 April 2005 32	Livingston	0 – 4	Celtic	Almondvale Stadium
19:45		BBC Report	Hartson 43', 75', 86' (pen.); Varga 90'	Attendance: 8,750; Referee: McCurry

16 April 2005 33	Hibernian	0 – 3	Livingston	Easter Road
15:00		BBC Report	Lilley 49'; Kachloul 61'; O'Brien 87'	Attendance: 11,047; Referee: Mackay

23 April 2005 34	Dundee United	1 – 1	Livingston	Tannadice
15:00	Crawford 37'	BBC Report	Deloumeaux 61'	Attendance: 7,687; Referee: Toner

30 April 2005 35	Livingston	2 – 0	Dunfermline Athletic	Almondvale Stadium
15:00	O'Brien 33'; McPake 74'	BBC Report		Attendance: 5,700; Referee: Thomson

7 May 2005 36	Inverness CT	0 – 1	Livingston	Caledonian Thistle
15:00		BBC Report	Dair 29'	Attendance: 3,021; Referee: Winter

14 May 2005 37	Kilmarnock	2 – 0	Livingston	Rugby Park
15:00	Boyd 75'; Johnston 85'	BBC Report		Attendance: 4,184; Referee: Brines

21 May 2005 38	Livingston	1 – 1	Dundee	Almondvale Stadium
15:00	Easton 27'	BBC Report	MacDonald 18'	Attendance: 8,968; Referee: Rowbotham

=== Scottish League Cup ===
25 August 2004 Second round	Stirling Albion	0 – 2	Livingston	Forthbank Stadium
19:45		BBC Report	Easton 30'; Hamilton 90'	Attendance: 1,091; Referee: Toner

21 September 2004 Third round	Livingston	2 – 1 (a.e.t.)	Dundee	Almondvale Stadium
19:45	Hamilton 90' (pen.), 111'	BBC Report	Robb 67'	Attendance: 1,736; Referee: Brines

9 November 2004 Quarter-final	Livingston	0 – 5	Motherwell	Almondvale Stadium
19:45	Dorado (red card) 59'	Livi Mad Report	Dorado 3' (o.g.); Foran 38', 60' (pen.); O'Donnell 57'; Wright 90'	Attendance: 2,886; Referee: Brines

=== Scottish Cup ===
11 January 2005 Third round	Livingston	2 – 1	Greenock Morton	Almondvale Stadium
19:45	Rubio 35'; Snodgrass 76'	Livi Mad Report	Weatherson 36'	Attendance: 2,761; Referee: Conroy

5 February 2005 Fourth round	Alloa Athletic	0 – 1	Livingston	Recreation Park
19:45		BBC Report	McMenamin 36'	Attendance: 2,103; Referee: Thomson

27 February 2005 Quarter-final	Heart of Midlothian	2 – 1	Livingston	Tynecastle Stadium
15:00	Miller 1' McAllister 10'	BBC Report	Easton 60'	Attendance: 9,796; Referee: Freeland

== Statistics ==
=== League table ===
Pos	Team	Pld	W	D	L	GF	GA	GD	Pts	Qualification or relegation (Note: Teams played each other three times (33 matches), before the league split into two groups (the top six and the bottom six) for the last five matches.)
8	Inverness Caledonian Thistle	38	11	11	16	41	47	−6	44	
9	Dundee United	38	8	12	18	41	59	−18	36	Qualification for the UEFA Cup second qualifying round (Note: As Celtic, the 2004–05 Scottish Cup winners, qualified for the UEFA Champions League via their league position, the place in the UEFA Cup was passed onto Dundee United, the cup runners-up.)
10	Livingston	38	9	8	21	34	61	−27	35	
11	Dunfermline Athletic	38	8	10	20	34	60	−26	34	
12	Dundee (R)	38	8	9	21	37	71	−34	33	Relegation to the Scottish First Division

Source: Scottish Professional Football League
Rules for classification: 1) Points; 2) Goal difference; 3) Goals scored
(R) Relegated
