= 2004 Scottish League Cup final =

- Event: 2003–04 Scottish League Cup
Hibernian	Livingston
0	2
- Date: 14 March 2004
- Venue: Hampden Park, Glasgow
- Man of the Match: Stuart Lovell
- Referee: Willie Young
- Attendance: 45,500

The 2004 Scottish League Cup final was played on 14 March 2004, at Hampden Park in Glasgow and was the final of the 57th Scottish League Cup. The final was contested by Hibernian and Livingston. Livingston won the match 2–0, thanks to goals from Derek Lilley and Jamie McAllister.

Livingston entered administration a few weeks before the final, with the players being informed the day before they won their semi-final match against Dundee. Six players left the club immediately, but the first team squad was largely left intact ahead of the final.

It was the first time since Hearts' 2–1 win over Rangers in the 1998 Scottish Cup Final that a team other than the Old Firm had won a trophy in Scotland, and the first time the feat had been achieved in the League Cup since 1995 when Aberdeen beat Dundee 2–0.

== Match details ==
14 March 2004

Hibernian	0–2	Livingston
	Report	Lilley 50'; McAllister 52'

Hampden Park, Glasgow
Attendance: 45,500
Referee: Willie Young

Hibernian	Livingston

HIBERNIAN :
GK	13	(Sweden) Daniel Andersson
RB	2	(Scotland) Gary Smith (c)	(substituted off) 63'
CB	14	(France) Mathias Kouo-Doumbé
CB	5	(Northern Ireland) Colin Murdock
LB	3	(England) Roland Edge
RM	18	(Scotland) Scott Brown
CM	26	(Scotland) Gary Caldwell
CM	19	(Scotland) Kevin Thomson
LM	22	(Scotland) Alan Reid	(substituted off) 70'
CF	9	(Scotland) Garry O'Connor
CF	10	(Scotland) Derek Riordan
Substitutes:
GK	30	(Scotland) Alistair Brown
DF	15	(Scotland) Steven Whittaker
MF	12	(Scotland) Kevin Nicol
FW	17	(Scotland) Stephen Dobbie	(substituted on) 70'
FW	7	(Scotland) Tam McManus	(substituted on) 63'
Manager:
(Scotland) Bobby Williamson

LIVINGSTON :
GK	18	(Scotland) Roddy McKenzie
RB	2	(Scotland) David McNamee	(substituted off) 80'
CB	4	(Spain) Óscar Rubio
CB	5	(Trinidad and Tobago) Marvin Andrews
CB	6	(France) Emmanuel Dorado
LB	3	(Scotland) Jamie McAllister
CM	14	(England) Lee Makel
CM	17	(Australia) Stuart Lovell (c)
CM	15	(Scotland) Burton O'Brien	(substituted off) 89'
CF	7	(Spain) David Fernandez	(substituted off) 86'
CF	16	(Scotland) Derek Lilley
Substitutes:
GK	1	(Scotland) Alan Main
DF	22	(Scotland) Scott McLaughlin	(substituted on) 80'
DF	23	(England) William Snowdon
MF	11	(Scotland) Jon Paul McGovern	(substituted on) 89'
FW	9	(Argentina) Fernando Pasquinelli	(substituted on) 86'
Manager:
(Scotland) David Hay
