= Cyril Panther =

Nigerian boxer

Personal information
- Nationality: Nigerian
- Born: Cyril Panther; 6 June 1938 (age 88) Nigeria
- Weight: Light middleweight

Boxing career

Boxing record
- Total fights: 45
- Wins: 15
- Win by KO: 10
- Losses: 25
- Draws: 5

Cyril Panther (born 6 June 1938 in Nigeria) was a Nigerian boxer.

== Career ==
Panther moved to Great Britain from Nigeria on the advice of his manager and his first fight was a defeat to Willie Hart in 1962. Problems with his cataract led to him becoming blind. He finished his boxing career in 1972 after fighting on 45 occasions.

== Personal life ==
His son is Scottish footballer Emmanuel Panther.
