= Marvin Andrews =

Trinidad and Tobago footballer

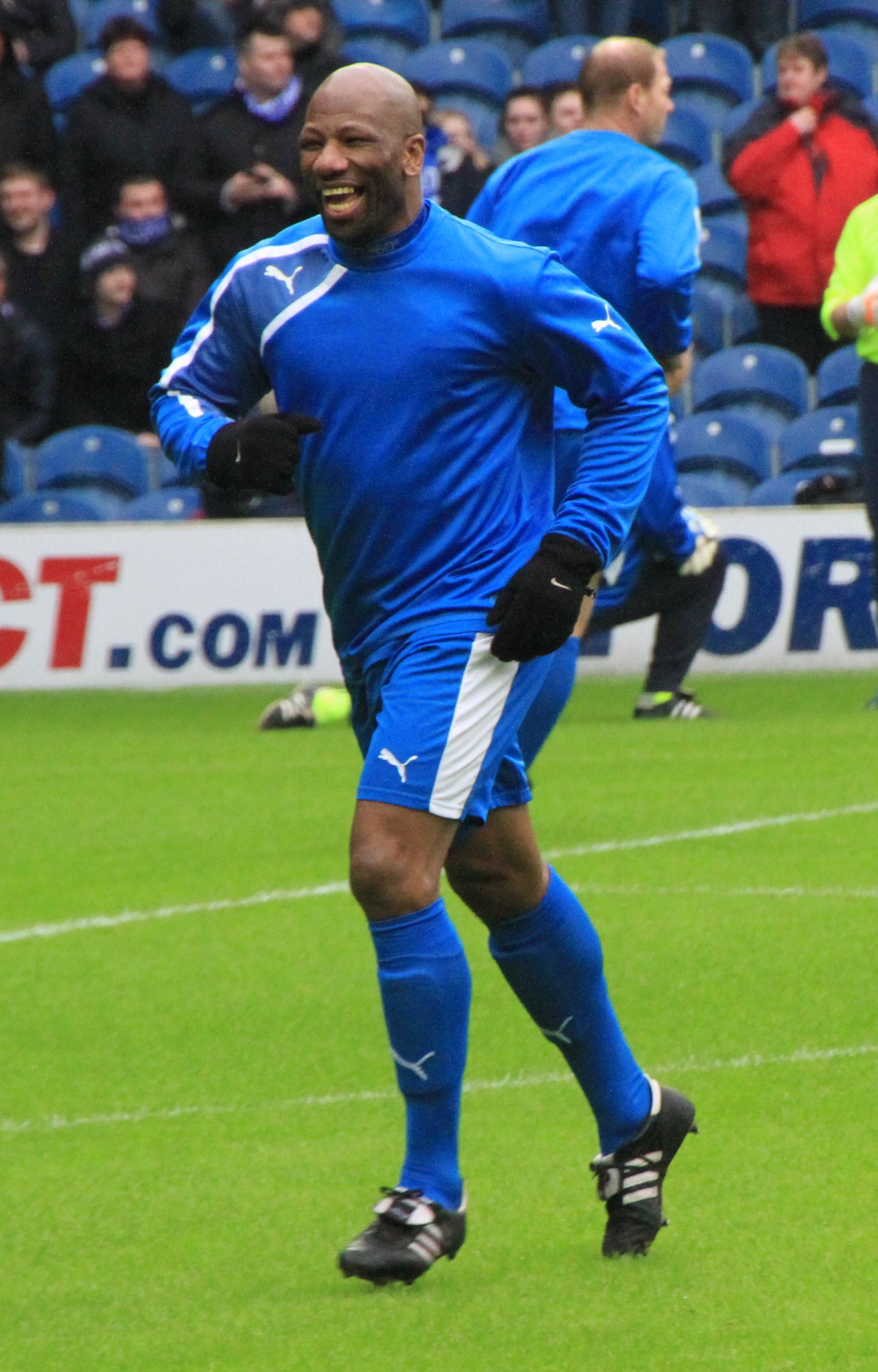
- Andrews in 2015

Personal information
- Full name: Marvin Andrews
- Date of birth: 22 December 1975 (age 50)
- Place of birth: San Juan, Trinidad and Tobago
- Height: 1.85 m (6 ft 1 in)
- Position: Centre back

Senior career*
Years	Team	Apps	(Gls)
1992–1994	ECM Motown		
1995–1996	San Juan Jabloteh		
1996–1997	Malta Carib Alcons		
1997–2000	Raith Rovers	63	(5)
2000–2004	Livingston	119	(8)
2004–2006	Rangers	53	(7)
2006–2008	Raith Rovers	41	(8)
2009	Raith Rovers	11	(0)
2009–2010	Hamilton Academical	2	(0)
2009–2010	→ Queen of the South (loan)	2	(0)
2010	Queen of the South	4	(0)
2010–2011	Wrexham	29	(2)
2011–2012	Kirkintilloch Rob Roy	5	(0)
2013	Albion Rovers	13	(2)
2013–2014	Forfar Athletic	17	(0)
2014–2015	Elgin City	10	(1)
2015	Montrose	12	(2)
2015–2016	Clyde	13	(1)
Total		394	(36)

International career
1996–2009	Trinidad and Tobago	101	(10)
- * Club domestic league appearances and goals

Marvin Andrews CM (born 22 December 1975) is a Trinidadian former professional footballer who played as a centre back.

Andrews's career includes spells at Livingston, with whom he won the Scottish League Cup in 2004, and Rangers, where he won the double of the League Cup and the Scottish Premier League title in 2005. Most recently he played for Scottish League Two club Clyde.

Between 1996 and 2006 Andrews was a regular for the Trinidad and Tobago national football team, winning 99 caps up to that point. He had stated that he wished for another callup in future, and earned his 100th cap in a 3–2 defeat to Costa Rica in a FIFA World Cup qualifying match on 6 June 2009.

== Club career ==
Andrews is tall, strong and very good in the air, as he has proven with a few goals over the years. Before moving to Scotland, he played with Carib F.C. of Trinidad.

Raith Rovers sold Andrews for around £50,000 in a multi-player deal, and he signed for Livingston on 28 September 2000. He was voted Raith Rovers' "Player of the Day" in the 1999–00 season, and also Livingston's "Player of the Year" for the 2003–04 season. On 14 March 2004, Andrews picked up his first major medal when Livingston won the 2003-04 Scottish League Cup by beating Hibernian 2–0 with goals by Derek Lilley and Jamie McAllister.

Andrews signed a two-year deal with Rangers in May 2004 and at the end of his first season with Rangers he scooped the Rangers Players' Player of the Year award, the club also won the Scottish Premier League title on the last day of the season. He was released by Rangers at the end of the 2005–06 season and was a free agent for a short while, before being re-signed by his former club Raith Rovers on 4 October 2006.

In May 2008, Andrews left Raith by mutual consent. He appeared for them as a trialist a little less than a year later, playing for the full 90 minutes in a 1–0 win over East Fife. Andrews stated that he wished to remain with Rovers for the rest of the season and signed up yet again with Raith Rovers on 11 March 2009. In July 2009, Andrews signed for SPL club Hamilton Academical.

On 7 December 2009, Dumfries club Queen of the South announced Andrews had signed on a one-month loan as cover for the suspended David Lilley and Stephen McKenna. Manager Gordon Chisholm gave Andrews his Queens debut on 12 December in the 2–1 win away to Morton. With bad weather causing a series of fixture postponements at Palmerston Park, Andrews played only one other game for Queens during the loan period, in the 2–2 draw away at Partick Thistle. However Andrews returned to QoS by signing a six-month deal on 29 January 2010. Andrews was released by Queens at the end of the 2009–10 season.

He joined Wrexham in August 2010 on a short-term contract for the 2010–11 season in the Conference Premier. At the end of 2011, he left Wrexham and joined Scottish Junior Football Association, West Region club Kirkintilloch Rob Roy.

At the start of 2013, he joined Albion Rovers in the Second Division. In July 2013, it was confirmed that he had signed for Forfar Athletic.

On 10 August 2014, Andrews made his debut for League Two side Elgin City. Andrews set up Craig Gunn to score the only goal of the game, as Elgin beat East Fife 1–0. After three games as a trialist, including two man of the match performances and one goal against Annan Athletic, Andrews signed a one-year deal with Elgin. He is quoted as saying "It’s a very, very nice club with great supporters, and the team plays very attractive football." He scored his second goal for Elgin in a 5-4 defeat to Bo'ness United F.C. in the Scottish Cup.

In January 2015, Andrews joined Montrose, and scored his first goal for the club in a 3-3 draw with Berwick Rangers. On 16 May 2015, he scored as Montrose came from behind to defeat Highland Football League champions Brora Rangers in a play-off to maintain their status in the SPFL. In September 2015, at the age of 39, Andrews signed for Clyde, playing in Scottish League Two. He scored on his debut against former club Elgin City. After playing in just 13 League matches, Marvin was released by the club at the end of the 2015–16 season.

== International career ==
Andrews was a key player for the Trinidad and Tobago national team. Having made his international début in 1996, Andrews has joined Angus Eve and Stern John in earning 100 caps for his country. He was a regular member of the national team during their qualification process for the 2006 FIFA World Cup, but a knee injury sustained prior to the opening match against Sweden virtually ruled him out of the tournament. Brent Sancho took his place in the team alongside Dennis Lawrence.

== Personal life ==
A devout Christian, Andrews also practices faith healing at the "Zion Praise Centre International", a church based in Kirkcaldy which is described as being Pentecostal. Andrews claims his faith was largely inspired by former Livingston teammate Javier Sánchez Broto.

In the 2004–05 season (his first season with Rangers) he injured the cruciate ligament in his knee while playing. The injury was supposed to keep him off the field for months but Marvin Andrews was only off for one Scottish League Cup match and was back the next week as he believed God would keep him fit, a move which worried medical staff and supporters alike. Andrews' leg and form held up for the rest of the season, which saw his first SPL medal but the same injury eventually caught up with him, ruling him out of Trinidad And Tobago's World Cup 2006 campaign. When Andrews scored for Rangers, or won the Man of the Match at Ibrox Stadium, the song "I'm a Believer" by The Monkees was played.

In February 2006, Andrews controversially labelled gay people as "an abomination" and said, "There is a demon in their spirits, their spirits are ill. But God can help them through his church and anyone who doubts this can check the Bible". In an interview with The Guardian in October 2007, he sought to clarify his beliefs, claiming that what was written in the 2006 article was "a misquote and it was taken out of context" and saying that he did not have anything against gay people themselves, rather that it was gay sexual practises that he believed were against God's will.

== Awards ==
As a member of the Trinidad and Tobago squad that competed at the 2006 FIFA World Cup in Germany, Andrews was awarded the Chaconia Medal (Gold Class), the second highest state decoration of Trinidad and Tobago.

== Career statistics ==
=== Club ===
Appearances and goals by club, season and competition
Club	Season	League			National Cup		League Cup		Continental		Total	
Club	Season	Division	Apps	Goals	Apps	Goals	Apps	Goals	Apps	Goals	Apps	Goals
Raith Rovers	1997–98	Scottish Division One	6	0								
Raith Rovers	1998–99	Scottish First Division	24	1								
Raith Rovers	1999-00	Scottish First Division	29	1								
Raith Rovers	2000–01	Scottish First Division	4	3								
Livingston	2000–01	Scottish First Division	13	0								
Livingston	2001–02	Scottish Premier League	33	3								
Livingston	2002–03	Scottish Premier League	33	4								
Livingston	2003–04	Scottish Premier League	38	0								
Rangers	2004–05	Scottish Premier League	30	4	1	0	2	0	5	0	38	4
Rangers	2005–06	Scottish Premier League	23	3	2	0	1	1	2	0	30	4
Career total			255	19								

=== International goals ===
Scores and results list Trinidad and Tobago's goal tally first, score column indicates score after each Andrews goal.

List of international goals scored by Marvin Andrews
No.	Date	Venue	Opponent	Score	Result	Competition
1	10 July 1997	Antigua Recreation Ground, St. John's, Antigua and Barbuda	Jamaica		1–1	1997 Caribbean Cup
2	13 July 1997	Antigua Recreation Ground, St. John's, Antigua and Barbuda	Saint Kitts and Nevis		4–0	1997 Caribbean Cup
3	11 June 1999	Hasely Crawford Stadium, Port of Spain, Trinidad and Tobago	Haiti		6–1	1999 Caribbean Cup
4	4 March 2000	Hasley Crawford Stadium, Port of Spain, Trinidad and Tobago	Netherlands Antilles		5–0	2002 World Cup qualification
5	18 March 2000	Stadion Ergilio Hato, Willemstad, Netherlands Antilles	Netherlands Antilles		1–1	2002 World Cup qualification
6	7 May 2000	Hasley Crawford Stadium, Port of Spain, Trinidad and Tobago	Haiti		3–1	2002 World Cup qualification
7	25 February 2001	Truman Bodden Stadium, George Town, Cayman Islands	Cayman Islands		3–0	Friendly
8	25 April 2001	Queen's Park Oval, Port of Spain, Trinidad and Tobago	Mexico		1–1	2002 World Cup qualification
9	13 June 2004	Estadio Olímpico Juan Pablo Duarte, Santo Domingo, Dominican Republic	Dominican Republic		2–0	2006 World Cup qualification
10	9 July 2005	Miami Orange Bowl, Miami, Florida, United States	Panama		2–2	2005 CONCACAF Gold Cup

== Honours ==
Livingston

- Scottish First Division: 2000–01
- Scottish League Cup: 2004

Rangers

- Scottish Premier League: 2004–05
- Scottish League Cup: 2005

Raith Rovers

- Scottish Second Division: 2008–09

Trinidad and Tobago

- Caribbean Cup: 1999, 2001

Individual

- Scottish Premier League Player of the Month: August 2001
- Chaconia Medal, Gold Class: 2006

== See also ==
- List of men's footballers with 100 or more international caps
