= Richie Byrne =

Irish footballer (born 1981)

Personal information
- Full name: Richard Philip Byrne
- Date of birth: 24 September 1981 (age 45)
- Place of birth: Dublin, Ireland
- Position: Left back

Youth career
- Belvedere
- Stella Maris

Senior career*
Years	Team	Apps	(Gls)
2000–2003	Shamrock Rovers	56	(0)
2003–2005	Dunfermline Athletic	19	(0)
2005–2008	Aberdeen	50	(1)
2008	Oldham Athletic	4	(0)
2009	Inverness Caledonian Thistle	0	(0)
2009	→ St Johnstone (loan)	5	(0)
2010	Darlington	4	(0)
2010	Hungerford Town	?	(?)
201x	Egham Town	4	(0)
2015	Horsham	11	(0)

International career^{‡}
2003	Republic of Ireland U21	1	(0)
2007	Republic of Ireland B	1	(1)
- * Club domestic league appearances and goals as of 21:56, 5 May 2010 (UTC) ‡ National team caps and goals as of 7 September 2008 (UTC)

Richard Philip Byrne (born 24 September 1981) is an Irish former footballer who played as left back. He played for clubs including Shamrock Rovers, Dunfermline Athletic and Aberdeen.

== Career ==
Byrne signed for Shamrock Rovers in the summer of 2000 from Stella Maris and made his debut in the Leinster Senior Cup away to St. Francis on 21 November 2000, in a 6–2 win. He was Young Player of the Year for the 2000–01 season. He made his full league debut on 16 September 2001 in a 3–0 win over Shelbourne. He made a total of six appearances in European competition for the Hoops, two in the UEFA Cup and four in the UEFA Intertoto Cup.

He joined Scottish club Dunfermline Athletic in August 2003 and helped the club reach the 2004 Scottish Cup final, where they were beaten 3–1 by Celtic at Hampden Park. He was signed by former manager at Dunfermline, Jimmy Calderwood for Aberdeen in January 2005 for £50,000. He played in the 2007–08 UEFA Cup against Atlético Madrid. On 15 April 2008, he was told he would not be offered a new contract by Aberdeen and would be free to leave in the summer along with six other players.

After his release, he had trials at Wigan Athletic and N.E.C. Nijmegen. He was given a one-week trial with Oldham Athletic, eventually being given a one-month contract with the club. He was given the number 3 shirt, and made his debut coming on as a substitute in the 3–3 draw with Hartlepool United.

On 14 January 2009, Byrne joined Inverness Caledonian Thistle on a contract until the end of the season. He was then loaned to First Division club St Johnstone. Following Inverness's relegation to the 1st Division Byrne was released as the club began reshaping its squad.

On 1 February 2010, Byrne joined Football League Two side Darlington. He made only two starts and two substitute appearances for the club, and was released before the end of the season.

Byrne signed for Hungerford Town in July 2010.

Byrne signed for Horsham FC in January 2015.

== International career ==
In November 2007, Byrne made his international debut for Republic of Ireland B national team, in a match against Scotland B. Byrne scored Ireland's goal in the 63rd minute, in a 1–1 draw.

== Honours ==
- SRFC Young Player of the Year:
  - Shamrock Rovers – 2001/02
