= Michael Bird (footballer) =

English footballer and coach

Personal information
- Date of birth: 7 November 1983 (age 42)
- Place of birth: Chester, England
- Position: Striker

Youth career
- Bolton Wanderers

Senior career*
Years	Team	Apps	(Gls)
2002–2003	Bolton Wanderers		
2003–2004	Aberdeen	2	(0)
2004	Glenavon		(2)
2004	Northwich Victoria		
2004	Witton Albion		
2004–2005	Caernarfon Town	14	(4)
2005	Warrington Town	2	(2)
2005–2006	Colwyn Bay		
2010	Central United		
2014	North Leigh	0	(0)
- * Club domestic league appearances and goals

Michael Bird (born 7 November 1983) is an English former professional footballer who played at schoolboy level for Wales. He played for clubs in all four constituent countries of the United Kingdom - England, Scotland, Northern Ireland and Wales.

He is a coach at Blackpool's Centre of Excellence.

== Career ==
=== Playing career ===
Bird started his career at Bolton Wanderers where he was a graduate of their Youth Academy. After impressing in a trial, he signed for Scottish Premier League club Aberdeen on 15 May 2003 on a free transfer where he made two league appearances, both as a substitute, and one League Cup appearance, also as a sub. After being made available for transfer in the transfer window, he moved to Northern Ireland to play for Irish Premier League club Glenavon in February 2004. In June 2004 he moved back to England into non-league football with Northwich Victoria, before signing for local rivals Witton Albion. He then moved to Wales in December 2004 to play for Welsh Premier League club Caernarfon Town where he spent the rest of the 2004–05 season.

He had a brief spell at the start of the 2005–06 season with Warrington Town before signing for Colwyn Bay on 2 September 2005.

Michael had a brief spell playing for North Leigh in 2014.

=== Coaching career ===
Bird used to be a qualified coach, having obtained the UEFA B coaching licence. He was the coach of the Under-11 team at Blackpool's Centre of Excellence.

=== Teaching career ===
Bird used to be a teacher, head of year, assistant headteacher, and deputy headteacher in Oxfordshire. He is a deputy head teacher at Ellesmere Park High School.
