= Manny Panther =

Scottish footballer (born 1984)

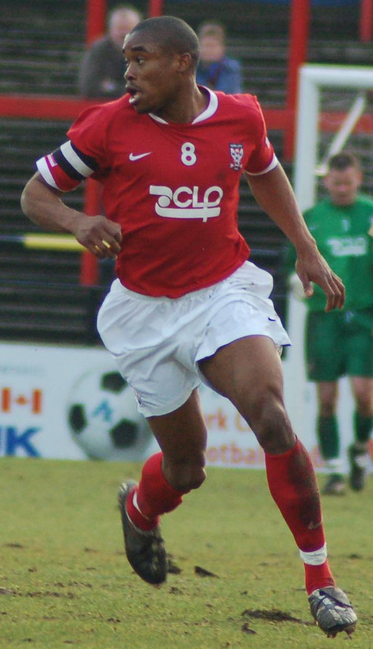
- Panther playing for York City in 2007

Personal information
- Full name: Emmanuel Ugochukwu Ezenwa Panther
- Date of birth: 11 May 1984 (age 42)
- Place of birth: Glasgow, Scotland
- Height: 6 ft 0 in (1.83 m)
- Position: Midfielder

Youth career
- 1997–2001: St Johnstone

Senior career*
Years	Team	Apps	(Gls)
2001–2003	St Johnstone	11	(0)
2003–2005	Partick Thistle	21	(2)
2005	→ Brechin City (loan)	8	(1)
2005–2008	York City	121	(4)
2008–2010	Exeter City	22	(2)
2008	→ Rushden & Diamonds (loan)	3	(0)
2009–2010	→ Morecambe (loan)	19	(0)
2010–2012	Aldershot Town	24	(0)
2011–2012	→ Grimsby Town (loan)	7	(0)
2012	Kidderminster Harriers	2	(0)
Total		238	(9)

International career
- Scotland U15
- * Club domestic league appearances and goals

Emmanuel Ugochukwu Ezenwa Panther (born 11 May 1984) is a Scottish former professional footballer who played as a midfielder. He played for St Johnstone, Partick Thistle, Brechin City, York City, Exeter City, Rushden & Diamonds, Morecambe, Aldershot Town, Grimsby Town and Kidderminster Harriers. He retired from football in 2012.

== Club career ==
=== St Johnstone ===
Born in Glasgow, Panther started his career at Scottish Premier League (SPL) side St Johnstone after joining their youth system at the age of 14, having spent a year with Rangers youth. During the 2001–02 season he suffered a long, career-threatening knee injury that limited him to only five first team appearances. He signed a new one-year deal with St Johnstone in 2002. He was released the following season.

=== Partick Thistle ===
He then joined SPL side Partick Thistle in June 2003, and signed a new contract in May 2004 that would last until January 2005, eventually leaving the club in the summer of that year. He was sent out on loan to Brechin City of the Scottish Second Division in February 2005. During his spell at Brechin he scored once against Arbroath.

=== York City ===
He signed for Conference National team York City in August 2005 after a trial. He signed a new contract with York at the end of the 2005–06 season, telling the club website "I struggled a bit with injury last season, but feel very fit and I'm ready for the season to begin". He was made the captain of York for the 2006–07 season and scored his first goal for the club on 18 November 2006 against Weymouth.

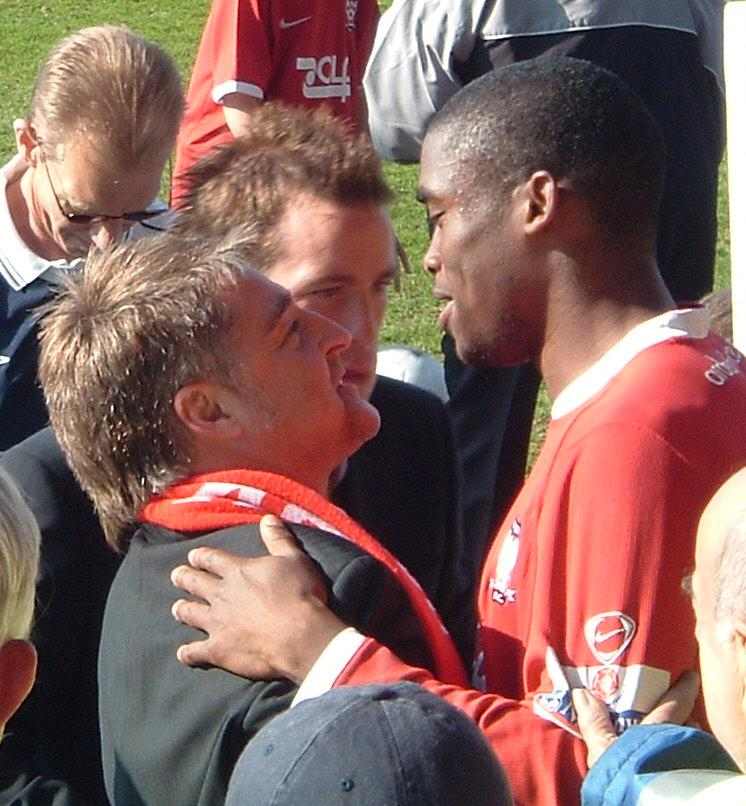
York City managing director Jason McGill (left) and Panther (right) in 2007

Panther said he was enjoying "a new lease of life" after being asked to play in a more advanced role for York, saying "I'm playing in a slightly different position to what I've been used to," he explained. "The manager has put me in a more attacking position and in a way it's given me a new lease of life." After the end of the season, he said he wanted to sign a new deal with York before leaving for his summer break. Panther was offered a new contract by York at the end of the season on 16 May 2007. Rumours were circulating linking him to a move to newly promoted Scottish Premier League outfit Gretna but he rejected this speculation, saying: I have not heard anything about that." He signed a new one-year contract with York on 16 June. He turned down a new contract in January 2008 and was released by the club after the 2007–08 season.

=== Exeter City ===
He signed for Exeter City on a three-year contract in May, following the club's promotion back to the Football League. After being an unused substitutes for the first two games of the season, he made his debut after coming off the bench in 75th minute of a 1–0 defeat to Shrewsbury Town. He returned to the Conference Premier by joining Rushden & Diamonds on a month's loan in September to gain more first team experience. He was sent off in his debut against Burton Albion a day after joining, which ended as a 2–1 victory. His final appearance for Rushden, a 3–1 defeat to Torquay United, also saw Panther dismissed, meaning he ended the loan spell with three appearances. After returning to Exeter he came on as a substitute and scored the equaliser against Morecambe in the 85th minute with a curling shot from outside the penalty area, securing a 1–1 draw. Towards the start of Exeter's League One campaign he handed in a transfer request that manager Paul Tisdale accepted. Panther joined League Two team Morecambe on a season-long loan for the 2009–10 season on 17 August 2009. On his return to Exeter, the club announced that he would be released when his contract expired on 30 June 2010.

=== Aldershot Town ===
Panther signed a one-year contract with Aldershot Town on 8 July. He made his debut for Aldershot on 7 August in a League Two fixture at Accrington Stanley. Conference Premier side Crawley Town made an offer for him in December. He signed for Conference Premier side Grimsby Town on loan until January 2012 on 11 November 2011. The loan ended prematurely after he was sent off in a 3–1 victory at home to Lincoln City on New Year's Day 2012, finishing his period at Grimsby with 12 appearances. Panther was released from his Aldershot contract by mutual consent on 29 March 2012.

=== Kidderminster Harriers ===
He signed with Conference Premier side Kidderminster Harriers on 31 August 2012. Having made two appearances his contract was mutually terminated on 6 December 2012 before retiring from football to concentrate on a business venture.

== International career ==
Panther represented Scotland at under-15 level in 1999 in a tournament in France, playing in games against France, the United States, Belgium and the Netherlands. Later in the year he was part of the squad that played England in the 1999 Victory Shield. In March 2000 he was in the squad to play Northern Ireland. Panther linked up with the under-19 squad in August 2002.

== Personal life ==
He is the son of Nigerian boxer Cyril Panther. In 2014, he appeared on channel E4 show Party House.

== Career statistics ==
Club statistics
Club	Season	League			National Cup		League Cup		Other		Total	
Club	Season	Division	Apps	Goals	Apps	Goals	Apps	Goals	Apps	Goals	Apps	Goals
St Johnstone	2001–02	Scottish Premier League	7	0	0	0	0	0	—		7	0
St Johnstone	2002–03	Scottish First Division	4	0	1	0	0	0	0	0	5	0
St Johnstone	Total		11	0	1	0	0	0	0	0	12	0
Partick Thistle	2003–04	Scottish Premier League	8	0	0	0	0	0	—		8	0
Partick Thistle	2004–05	Scottish First Division	13	2	0	0	2	0	3 (Note: Appearances in Scottish Challenge Cup)	2	18	4
Partick Thistle	Total		21	2	0	0	2	0	3	2	26	4
Brechin City (loan)	2004–05	Scottish Second Division	8	1	0	0	0	0	0	0	8	1
York City	2005–06	Conference National	37	0	0	0	—		0	0	37	0
York City	2006–07	Conference National	44	3	2	0	—		3 (Note: One appearance in FA Trophy, two in Conference National play-offs)	0	49	3
York City	2007–08	Conference Premier	40	1	2	0	—		8 (Note: Seven appearances in FA Trophy, one in Conference League Cup)	0	50	1
York City	Total		121	4	4	0	—		11	0	136	4
Exeter City	2008–09	League Two	22	2	0	0	0	0	1 (Note: Appearance in Football League Trophy)	0	23	2
Rushden & Diamonds (loan)	2008–09	Conference Premier	3	0	0	0	—		0	0	3	0
Morecambe (loan)	2009–10	League Two	19	0	0	0	0	0	1 (Note: Appearance in League Two play-offs)	0	20	0
Aldershot Town	2010–11	League Two	23	0	1	0	1	0	1	0	26	0
Aldershot Town	2011–12	League Two	1	0	0	0	0	0	0	0	1	0
Aldershot Town	Total		24	0	1	0	1	0	1	0	27	0
Grimsby Town (loan)	2011–12	Conference Premier	7	0	4	0	—		1 (Note: Appearance in FA Trophy)	0	12	0
Kidderminster Harriers	2012–13	Conference Premier	2	0	0	0	—		0	0	2	0
Career total			238	9	10	0	3	0	18	2	269	11
