= Willie Howie =

Scottish footballer

Personal information
- Full name: William Howie
- Date of birth: 9 July 1982 (age 44)
- Place of birth: Rutherglen, Scotland
- Position: Midfielder

Youth career
- Partick Thistle B.C.

Senior career*
| Years | Team | Apps | (Gls) |
| 1999–2005 | Partick Thistle | 32 | (0) |
| 2005–2011 | Glenafton Athletic | | |
| 2011–2013 | Cumnock Juniors | | |
| 2013–2014 | Pollok | | |
- * Club domestic league appearances and goals as of 14:13, 21 February 2018 (UTC)

William Howie (born 9 July 1982) is a Scottish former football who last played as a midfielder for Pollok in the Scottish Junior Football Association, West Region. He previously played in the Scottish Premier League with Partick Thistle.

== Career ==
Howie joined Partick Thistle from their youth set-up in 1999 and made his first team debut against Queen of the South at the age of sixteen in May of that year. A few months after he signed a new contract with the Jags in April 2001, his career was interrupted after a serious assault in a Glasgow street left him with a fractured skull, spending a month in hospital with his future as a player in doubt. Howie returned to the Partick first team in November 2003, by which time the club had been promoted to the Scottish Premier League, and made eleven appearances before the end of the season, which ended in relegation.

After his release by Partick Thistle in 2005, Howie joined Junior side Glenafton Athletic under the management of his former Thistle boss Gerry Collins. He moved on to local East Ayrshire rivals Cumnock Juniors in the summer of 2011 before signing for Pollok in June 2013. Despite being named captain, his spell with the club ended with a suspension after he was sent off following an altercation with an opponent in a fixture against Auchinleck Talbot; Pollok were relegated at the end of the season.

== Championship Manager ==
Howie's name became well known around the world to fans of the Championship Manager football video game series, after some of its versions produced around the time of his breakthrough at Partick Thistle coded his potential abilities generously, whereby he would develop into one of the world's finest players. In an interview for a book based around the series, Howie stated that he had been "addicted" to playing the game and would always sign 'himself', often seeking a partnership with Mark Kerr, another Scottish midfielder of the era whose elevated profile in the virtual universe brought him extra attention in real life.
