= 2004–05 Scottish Football League =

Scottish football season

Statistics of the Scottish Football League in season 2004–05.

== Scottish First Division ==
=== League standings ===
Pos	Team	Pld	W	D	L	GF	GA	GD	Pts	Promotion or relegation
1	Falkirk (C, P)	36	22	9	5	66	30	+36	75	Promotion to the Premier League
2	St Mirren	36	15	15	6	41	23	+18	60	
3	Clyde	36	16	12	8	35	29	+6	60	
4	Queen of the South	36	14	9	13	36	38	−2	51	
5	Airdrie United	36	14	8	14	44	48	−4	50	
6	Ross County	36	13	8	15	40	37	+3	47	
7	Hamilton Academical	36	12	11	13	35	36	−1	47	
8	St Johnstone	36	12	10	14	38	39	−1	46	
9	Partick Thistle (R)	36	10	9	17	38	52	−14	39	Relegation to the Second Division
10	Raith Rovers (R)	36	3	7	26	26	67	−41	16	Relegation to the Second Division

Source: "2004-2005 First Division - SPFL Archive". SPFL (in Malay).
Rules for classification: 1) points; 2) goal difference; 3) number of goals scored.
(C) Champions; (P) Promoted; (R) Relegated

=== Top scorers ===
Scorer	Team	Goals
(Scotland) Darryl Duffy	Falkirk	17
(Scotland) Ian Harty	Clyde	15
(Republic of Ireland) Owen Coyle	Airdrie United	14
(Australia) Daniel McBreen	Falkirk	13
(Scotland) David McNiven	Queen of the South	12
(Scotland) Peter MacDonald	St Johnstone	11
(Scotland) Alan Gow	Airdrie United	9
(Scotland) Andy Thomson	Falkirk	9
(Trinidad and Tobago) Russell Latapy	Falkirk	7
(Scotland) Derek Lyle	Queen of the South	7
(Scotland) John O'Neill	St Mirren	7

== Scottish Second Division ==
=== League standings ===
Pos	Team	Pld	W	D	L	GF	GA	GD	Pts	Promotion or relegation
1	Brechin City (C, P)	36	22	6	8	81	43	+38	72	Promotion to the First Division
2	Stranraer (P)	36	18	9	9	48	41	+7	63	Promotion to the First Division
3	Greenock Morton	36	18	8	10	60	37	+23	62	
4	Stirling Albion	36	14	9	13	56	55	+1	51	
5	Forfar Athletic	36	13	8	15	51	45	+6	47	
6	Alloa Athletic	36	12	10	14	66	68	−2	46	
7	Dumbarton	36	11	9	16	43	53	−10	42	
8	Ayr United	36	11	9	16	39	54	−15	42	
9	Arbroath (R)	36	10	8	18	49	73	−24	38	Relegation to the Third Division
10	Berwick Rangers (R)	36	8	10	18	40	64	−24	34	Relegation to the Third Division

Source: "2004-2005 Second Division - SPFL Archive". SPFL (in Malay).
Rules for classification: 1) points; 2) goal difference; 3) number of goals scored.
(C) Champions; (P) Promoted; (R) Relegated

=== Top scorers ===
Scorer	Team	Goals
(Scotland) Chris Templeman	Brechin City / Greenock Morton	21
(Scotland) Paul Shields	Forfar Athletic	20
(Scotland) Steven Hampshire	Brechin City	15
(Scotland) Paul Ritchie	Brechin City	14
(Scotland) David Graham	Stranraer	14
(Scotland) Paul Tosh	Forfar Athletic	13
(Scotland) Greg Henslee	Arbroath	11
(Scotland) Graeme Gibson	Brechin City	11
(Scotland) Iain Russell	Dumbarton	11
(England) Peter Weatherson	Greenock Morton	10
(Scotland) Robert Dunn	Stirling Albion	10
(Scotland) Chris Millar	Greenock Morton	10
(Scotland) Stewart Kean	Ayr United	10

== Scottish Third Division ==
=== League standings ===
Pos	Team	Pld	W	D	L	GF	GA	GD	Pts	Promotion
1	Gretna (C, P)	36	32	2	2	130	29	+101	98	Promotion to the Second Division
2	Peterhead (P)	36	23	9	4	81	38	+43	78	Promotion to the Second Division
3	Cowdenbeath	36	14	9	13	54	61	−7	51	
4	Queen's Park	36	13	9	14	51	50	+1	48	
5	Montrose	36	13	7	16	47	53	−6	46	
6	Elgin City	36	12	7	17	39	61	−22	43	
7	Stenhousemuir	36	10	12	14	58	58	0	42	
8	East Fife	36	10	8	18	40	56	−16	38	
9	Albion Rovers	36	8	10	18	40	78	−38	34	
10	East Stirlingshire	36	5	7	24	32	88	−56	22	

Source: "2004-2005 Third Division - SPFL Archive". SPFL.
Rules for classification: 1) points; 2) goal difference; 3) number of goals scored.
(C) Champions; (P) Promoted

=== Top scorers ===
Rank	Scorer	Goals	Team
1	(Scotland) Kenny Deuchar	38	Gretna
2	(Scotland) David Bingham	27	Gretna
3	(Scotland) Scott Michie	21	Peterhead
4	(Scotland) Paul McGrillen	18	Stenhousemuir
5	(Scotland) Craig Smart	14	Montrose
5	(Scotland) Frankie Carrol	14	Queen's Park
7	(Scotland) Martin Bavidge	13	Peterhead
8	(England) Gavin Skelton	12	Gretna
8	(Scotland) Darren Gribben	12	Cowdenbeath
10	(Scotland) Joseph Savage	9	Stenhousemuir
10	(Scotland) Steven Nicholas	9	East Fife
10	(Scotland) William Martin	9	Elgin City

== See also ==
- 2004–05 in Scottish football
