= Carlos Aurelio =

Argentine former football manager

Personal information
- Full name: Carlos Dario Aurelio
- Date of birth: 22 May 1976 (age 50)
- Place of birth: Argentina
- Position: Defender

Senior career*
Years	Team	Apps	(Gls)
1997–1999	Gimnasia	44	(0)
1999–2000	Brescia	25	(0)
2000–2001	Cosenza	17	(1)
2001–2002	Livingston	14	(1)
2002–2005	SPAL	69	(0)
2006	Argentinos Juniors	2	(0)
2008–2009	Alvarado	13	(1)

Managerial career
- 2018: Liepāja
- * Club domestic league appearances and goals

Carlos Dario Aurelio (born 22 May 1976) is an Argentine former football manager who is last known to have managed Liepāja.

== Career ==
=== Playing career ===
In 1999, Aurelio signed for Italian side Brescia, where he made 25 league appearances and scored 0 goals. In 2001, he signed for Livingston in the Scottish top flight. In 2002, Aurelio signed for Italian third division club SPAL. In 2006, he signed for Argentinos Juniors in the Argentine top flight. In 2008, he signed for Argentine third division team Alvarado.

=== Managerial career ===
In 2018, Aurelio was appointed manager of Liepāja in Latvia but left due to not having the UEFA Pro License.
