= Fernando Pasquinelli =

Argentine footballer (born 1980)

Personal information
- Full name: Fernando Adrián Pasquinelli
- Date of birth: 13 March 1980 (age 46)
- Place of birth: Santa Fe, Argentina
- Position: Striker

Senior career*
Years	Team	Apps	(Gls)
1999–2000	Boca Juniors	0	(0)
2000	→ Leicester City (loan)	0	(0)
2001	Motagua		
2001–2002	San Telmo	24	(6)
2002	Temperley		
2003–2004	Livingston	27	(4)
2004–2005	Aberdeen	10	(3)
2005–2006	Talleres		
2007	Platense		
2007	Temperley		
2008	LDU Portoviejo	16	(5)
2008–2010	Sarmiento		
2010	Tristán Suárez	14	(2)
2010–2012	Club Atlético Sarmiento		
2012–2013	Barracas Central	14	(2)
2013–2014	Club Atlético San Telmo	5	(0)
Total		110+	(22+)
- * Club domestic league appearances and goals

Fernando Adrián Pasquinelli (born 13 March 1980) is an Argentine former professional footballer who played as a striker.

== Career ==
Born in Santa Fe, Pasquinelli spent his early career in Argentina with Boca Juniors and Talleres.

He had a brief spell in England with Leicester City on loan, but failed to make a single appearance for the club.

He moved to Scotland in 2003, making 27 league appearances for Livingston. He contributed to their victorious 2003–04 Scottish League Cup campaign, including winning the penalty that Livingston scored to beat Dundee in the semi-final, and then coming on as a late substitute as they beat Hibernian in the 2004 Scottish League Cup final. He left Livingston following financial problems at the club.

He signed for Aberdeen in August 2004. Pasquinelli made ten league appearances for Aberdeen, before being released in March 2005 due to injury.

After leaving Scotland in 2005, Pasquinelli later played in Argentina for Talleres and Sarmiento. While at Sarmiento, Pasquinelli scored 8 goals in 7 league games.

He had spells at Barracas Central and Club Atlético San Telmo before retiring from football in 2013.
