= Massimiliano Caputo =

Italian footballer (born 1980)

Personal information
- Date of birth: 10 September 1980 (age 46)
- Place of birth: Naples, Italy
- Height: 1.69 m (5 ft 6 1/2 in)
- Position: Striker

Senior career*
Years	Team	Apps	(Gls)
1997–2003	Brescia	7	(0)
2000	→ Ascoli (loan)	11	(2)
2001	→ AlbinoLeffe (loan)	12	(0)
2001–2002	→ Livingston (loan)	21	(0)
2003	Sora	12	(5)
2003–2004	Salernitana	13	(0)
2004–2005	Sora	26	(4)
2005–2006	Südtirol	21	(4)
2006–2008	Juve Stabia	57	(14)
2008–2009	Catanzaro	43	(18)
2010	Cisco Roma	13	(3)
2010–2011	Atletico Roma	25	(2)
2011–2012	Salerno	30	(9)
2012–2013	Matera	23	(10)
2013–2014	Foligno	0	(0)
- * Club domestic league appearances and goals as of 08:21, 28 May 2013 (UTC)

Massimiliano Caputo (born 10 September 1980 in Naples) is a former Italian professional footballer who last played forward for Foligno.

Caputo spent the 2001–02 season on loan at Scottish club Livingston. He didn't score a league goal in 21 games but did score four goals in the Scottish League Cup; scoring twice against East Fife and twice against Aberdeen.
