= Philippe Brinquin =

French footballer (born 1971)

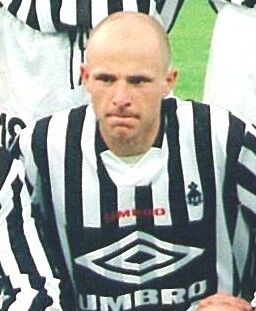

Personal information
- Date of birth: 2 June 1971 (age 55)
- Place of birth: Quimperlé, France
- Height: 1.75 m (5 ft 9 in)
- Position: Defender

Senior career*
Years	Team	Apps	(Gls)
1991–1997	Lorient	111	(5)
1997–1999	Rennes	49	(0)
2000	Le Havre AC	7	(0)
2000–2003	Livingston	64	(2)

International career
1998	Brittany	1	(0)
- * Club domestic league appearances and goals

Philippe Brinquin (born 2 June 1971) is a retired French professional football player.

== Playing career ==
Brinquin had an unsuccessful trial at Bradford City before signing for Scottish side Livingston in February 2000.

== Honours ==
Livingston

- Scottish First Division: 2000–01
