= Rubio (footballer, born 1976) =

Spanish footballer and coach

Personal information
- Full name: Óscar Montalbán Ramos
- Date of birth: 17 May 1976 (age 50)
- Place of birth: Madrid, Spain
- Height: 1.83 m (6 ft 0 in)
- Position: Centre-back

Senior career*
Years	Team	Apps	(Gls)
1994–1997	Alcalá		
1997–1998	Mallorca B	20	(0)
1998–1999	Real Madrid B	27	(0)
1999	Real Madrid	0	(0)
1999	→ Mérida (loan)	0	(0)
2000	Toledo	20	(0)
2000–2001	Farense	12	(0)
2001–2005	Livingston	123	(6)
2005–2006	Rayo Vallecano	19	(2)
2006–2009	Galáctico Pegaso		
Total		221	(8)

Managerial career
- 2012–2014: Carabanchel
- 2016: Complutense
- * Club domestic league appearances and goals

Óscar Montalbán Ramos (born 17 May 1976), known as Rubio, is a Spanish former professional football player and coach who played as a central defender.

== Playing career ==
=== Spain ===
After playing several years in the lower leagues, Rubio signed with Real Madrid in 1998, spending the vast majority of his spell in the Segunda División B with the reserves. He made his only appearance for the first team in the 1998–99 edition of the Copa del Rey, against Valencia CF: after a 6–0 away loss, he featured in the second leg, an insufficient 2–1 win.

Rubio was loaned to CP Mérida for 1999–2000, failing to appear in a single match. In January 2000, he was released by Madrid and joined CD Toledo also of Segunda División– both clubs would be relegated at the end of the season, the former due to financial irregularities.

=== Livingston ===
Rubio spent his first year in top-flight football with Portugal's S.C. Farense, playing less than half of the Primeira Liga games as his team finished in 13th position. He signed for Scottish Premier League side Livingston in July 2001, going on to make a total of 148 official appearances for them over the next four years and score eight goals.

In the 2001–02 campaign, Rubio appeared in 33 matches as the Livi Lions finished in a best-ever third place, with the subsequent qualification for the UEFA Cup. He then made history by becoming the first ever Livingston player to score in a European competition, when he netted a header in the club's first game, a 1–1 draw at FC Vaduz (eventual away goals rule qualification). He contributed to the team's victorious run in the Scottish League Cup in 2003–04, including starting and finishing the final against Hibernian.

=== Later career ===
Rubio left Livingston in July 2005 and moved back to his country, spending one season in the third tier with Rayo Vallecano. He retired in 2009 at the age of 33 after three years with amateurs Galáctico Pegaso, also in his native Madrid.

== Post-retirement ==
After retiring, Rubio worked as an English teacher at the Educrea High School. He was also a manager at amateur level.
