= 2003–04 Scottish League Cup =

2003–04 Co-operative Insurance Cup
Tournament details
- Country: Scotland

Final positions
- Champions: Livingston
- Runners-up: Hibernian

Tournament statistics
- Top goal scorer: Stephen Dobbie (4)

The 2003–04 Scottish League Cup was the 58th staging of the Scotland's second most prestigious football knockout competition, also known for sponsorship reasons as the CIS Insurance Cup.

The competition was won by Livingston, who defeated Hibernian 2–0 in the final.

== First round ==
- Ties played on 2–3 September 2003
- If scores were level at full-time, 30 minutes of extra time and penalties were played.

Tie No.	Home team	Score	Away team	Report	Attendance
1	Arbroath	1–0	Raith Rovers	Details	879
2	Ayr	1–2	Dumbarton	Details	1,048
3	Cowdenbeath	3–0	Alloa	Details	288
4	East Fife	0–2	Airdrie United	Details	707
5	East Stirlingshire	1–2	Ross County	Details	208
6	Elgin	0–4	Brechin	Details	486
7	Forfar Athletic	1–0	Berwick Rangers	Details	
8	Gretna	1–2	Peterhead	Details	385
9	Hamilton Academical	3–2	Albion Rovers	Details	824
10	Inverness CT	1–2	Queen's Park	Details	968
11	Montrose	2–0	Stirling Albion	Details	247
12	St Mirren	0–2	St Johnstone	Details	3,100
13	Stenhousemuir	1–2	Queen of the South	Details	424
14	Greenock Morton	2–0	Stranraer	Details	2,758

== Second round ==
- Ties played on 23–24 September 2003
- If scores were level at full-time, 30 minutes of extra time and penalties were played.

Tie No.	Home team	Score	Away team	Report	Attendance
1	Aberdeen	3–1	Dumbarton	Details	3,944
2	Arbroath	3–4 (aet)	Falkirk	Details	923
3	Brechin City	1–0	Kilmarnock	Details	829
4	Clyde	2–1	Airdrie United	Details	1,381
5	Dundee United	3–1	Morton	Details	5,638
6	Forfar Athletic	3–3 (p)	Motherwell	Details	1,110
7	Hibernian	9–0	Montrose	Details	5,032
8	Queen's Park	1–3	Livingston	Details	1,011
9	Ross County	0–3	Queen of the South	Details	959
10	St Johnstone	3–2 (aet)	Hamilton	Details	1,471
11	Dunfermline	2–0	Cowdenbeath	Details	3,582
12	Peterhead	2–2 (p)	Partick Thistle	Details	1,350

== Third round ==
28 October 2003

Aberdeen	5–0	Brechin City
Tosh 10'; Booth 13'; Muirhead 37'; Sheerin 40'; Hinds 85'

Pittodrie Stadium, Aberdeen
Attendance: 3,631
Referee: Kenny Clark

28 October 2003

Hibernian	2–1	Queen of the South
Riordan 11', 23'		Burke 90' (pen.)

Easter Road, Edinburgh
Attendance: 7,613
Referee: Mike McCurry

28 October 2003

Rangers	6–0	Forfar Athletic
Nerlinger 15', 53', 70'; Løvenkrands 22'; Capucho 50'; Østenstad 75'

Ibrox Stadium, Glasgow
Attendance: 26,327
Referee: Stuart Dougal

28 October 2003

St Johnstone	3–2	Dunfermline Athletic
Donnelly 9'; Dods 70'; MacDonald 73'		Crawford 80'; Young 83'

McDiarmid Park, Perth
Attendance: 2,769
Referee: John Underhill

29 October 2003

Clyde	2–5	Dundee
Keogh 2'; Gilhaney 76'		Novo 4'; Wilkie 66'; Ravanelli 73', 74', 80'

Broadwood Stadium, Cumbernauld
Attendance: 1,701
Referee: Douglas McDonald

29 October 2003

Dundee United	0–1	Livingston
		Gallacher 19' (o.g.)

Tannadice Park, Dundee
Attendance: 2,899
Referee: Willie Young

29 October 2003

Hearts	2–1	Falkirk
de Vries 54'; Kirk 86'		Latapy 58'

Tynecastle Stadium, Edinburgh
Attendance: 8,649
Referee: John Rowbotham

4 December 2003

Partick Thistle	0–2	Celtic
		Beattie 31'; Smith 75',

Firhill, Glasgow
Attendance: 5,700
Referee: Mike McCurry

== Quarter-finals ==
2 December 2003

Aberdeen	2–3 (a.e.t.)	Livingston
Tosh 34', 59'		Lilley 15'; Pasquinelli 50'; Makel 99'

Pittodrie Stadium, Aberdeen
Attendance: 6,090
Referee: Stuart Dougal

3 December 2003

Dundee	1–0 (a.e.t.)	Hearts
Linn 107'

Dens Park, Dundee
Attendance: 7,130
Referee: Willie Young

3 December 2003

Rangers	3–0	St Johnstone
Burke 16'; Østenstad 59'; Mols 90'

Ibrox Stadium, Glasgow
Attendance: 29,395

18 December 2003

Hibernian	2–1	Celtic
Brebner 64' (pen.); Thomson 82'		Varga 56'

Easter Road, Edinburgh
Attendance: 9,246
Referee: John Rowbotham

== Semi-finals ==
3 February 2004

Dundee	0–1	Livingston
		Lilley 90' (pen.)

Easter Road, Edinburgh
Attendance: 6,600
Referee: Mike McCurry

5 February 2004

Hibernian	1–1 (a.e.t.)	Rangers
Dobbie 79'		Mols 40'
Penalties
	4–3

Hampden Park, Glasgow
Attendance: 27,954
Referee: Kenny Clark

== Final ==
14 March 2004

Hibernian	0–2	Livingston
		Lilley 50'; McAllister 52'

Hampden Park, Glasgow
Attendance: 45,500
Referee: Willie Young
