= Leigh Hinds =

English footballer (born 1978)

Personal information
- Date of birth: 17 August 1978 (age 48)
- Place of birth: Beckenham, England
- Position: Striker

Senior career*
Years	Team	Apps	(Gls)
1999–2001	Wimbledon	0	(0)
2001	→ Clyde (loan)	7	(3)
2001–2003	Clyde	51	(14)
2003–2004	Aberdeen	42	(8)
2004–2005	Partick Thistle	35	(3)
2005–2006	Stranraer	31	(1)
Total		166	(29)
- * Club domestic league appearances and goals

Leigh Hinds (born 17 August 1978) is an English footballer who played as a striker.

== Career ==
Hinds began his professional career with Wimbledon but failed to make an appearance, spending the latter part of the 2000-01 season on loan at Clyde. Hinds moved to Clyde permanently at the start of the following season and spent eighteen months with the Bully Wee before winning a January 2003 move to Aberdeen. Hinds spent a similar length of time at Pittodrie, which included a fine of two weeks' wages for an off-the-field incident, before moving to Partick Thistle at the start of the 2004-05 season. A season at Stranraer followed before Hinds' departure from professional football in May 2006.
