= Lee Makel =

English footballer (born 1973)

Personal information
- Full name: Lee Robert Makel
- Date of birth: 11 January 1973 (age 53)
- Place of birth: Sunderland, England
- Position: Midfielder

Senior career*
Years	Team	Apps	(Gls)
1991–1992	Newcastle United	12	(1)
1992–1995	Blackburn Rovers	6	(0)
1995–1998	Huddersfield Town	66	(5)
1998–2001	Heart of Midlothian	50	(1)
1999	→ Portsmouth (loan)	0	(0)
2001	Bradford City	13	(0)
2001–2004	Livingston	80	(10)
2004–2005	Plymouth Argyle	19	(0)
2005–2006	Dunfermline Athletic	31	(2)
2006–2008	Livingston	49	(0)
2008–2009	Östersund	22	(6)
2009	East Fife	8	(1)
2009–2010	Östersund	12	(5)
2011–2013	Cowdenbeath	12	(0)
Total		380	(31)

Managerial career
- 2009–2010: Östersund
- * Club domestic league appearances and goals

Lee Robert Makel (born 11 January 1973) is an English former professional footballer who played as a midfielder.

== Playing career ==
Makel began his career with Newcastle United as a trainee in 1991 and made 14 appearances. He moved to Blackburn Rovers for £160,000 in 1992 but only played six league matches in three years for the club. He was at the club during their Premier League winning campaign, but did not make any appearances in the league, only appearing in the UEFA Cup in Rovers' 1994–95 season.

In 1995, he moved to Huddersfield Town where he spent two and a half seasons before moving to Scottish Premier Division club Heart of Midlothian for £75,000 in March 1998. He remained at Hearts until 2001, helping them win the 1998 Scottish Cup before returning to England for a brief spell with Bradford City under his former Hearts manager Jim Jefferies.

He returned to Scotland in December 2001 with Livingston, helping them to a third-place finish in their first Scottish Premier League season and a place in the UEFA Cup. He was also part of the team which won the 2004 League Cup. In 2004, Bobby Williamson signed him for Plymouth Argyle where he remained for just one season.

He again returned to Scotland in 2005 with Dunfermline Athletic before returning to Livingston in 2006.

In 2009, Makel joined East Fife and scored his first and only goal for the club in a 4–0 win over Stranraer.

== Coaching career ==
Makel left Livingston to join Swedish Division 1 Norra side Östersund on 1 April 2008, taking up a player-coaching role with the club. A club he re-joined in June 2009 as a player/joint-coach. In January 2011, Makel signed for Scottish First Division side Cowdenbeath until the end of the season. Makel was appointed assistant manager to Colin Cameron at Cowdenbeath six months later, following the resignation of Jimmy Nicholl. As of October 2015, Makel was coaching Hibernian academy players.

== Personal life ==
Makel was born in Sunderland and brought up in Washington, Tyne and Wear. He was a fan of Sunderland A.F.C. as a boy. His younger brother, Gavin, was a child actor appearing as Rob in BBC series Byker Grove from 1996 to 1998.

== Honours ==
Heart of Midlothian

- Scottish Cup: 1997–98

Livingston

- Scottish League Cup: 2003–04
