= Derek Lilley =

Scottish footballer

Personal information
- Full name: Derek Simon Lilley
- Date of birth: 9 February 1974 (age 52)
- Place of birth: Paisley, Scotland
- Height: 5 ft 10 in (1.78 m)
- Position: Striker

Youth career
- –1991: Everton B.C.

Senior career*
| Years | Team | Apps | (Gls) |
| 1991–1997 | Greenock Morton | 180 | (57) |
| 1997–1999 | Leeds United | 20 | (1) |
| 1998–1999 | → Heart of Midlothian (loan) | 4 | (1) |
| 1999 | → Bury (loan) | 5 | (1) |
| 1999–2000 | Oxford United | 63 | (9) |
| 2000–2003 | Dundee United | 77 | (14) |
| 2003–2005 | Livingston | 66 | (15) |
| 2005–2007 | Greenock Morton | 51 | (16) |
| 2007 | St. Johnstone | 14 | (0) |
| 2007–2008 | Stirling Albion | 23 | (0) |
| 2008–2009 | Forfar Athletic | 22 | (8) |
| Total | | 525 | (116) |
- * Club domestic league appearances and goals

Derek Simon Lilley (born 9 February 1974) is a Scottish former footballer who played as a striker for several clubs in Scotland and England.

He started his career with Greenock Morton, before a big-money move to Premier League side Leeds United. He had loan spells with Hearts and Bury before joining Oxford United.

In 2000, Lilley returned to Scotland with Dundee United, playing with them, Livingston, Morton again, and St. Johnstone, Stirling Albion then finally Forfar Athletic.

== Career ==
=== Morton and England ===
Lilley began his career with Greenock Morton and won a move to English Premier League side Leeds United in 1997. His time at Elland Road was frustrating, with only four starts from 21 appearances and only a solitary goal when he replaced Lee Bowyer to score the winner in a 3–2 away win at Barnsley. He spent three months on loan, at Heart of Midlothian and Bury, where again he managed a goal for each club. His goal at Hearts coming in a 2–1 defeat to Dundee, and his goal at Bury coming in a crucial 1–0 win over Oxford United.

A move to Oxford United in 1999–00 helped kick-start his career and his return of nine goals from 63 appearances prompted interest from Dundee United.

=== Scotland ===
A move in December 2000 saw him head north to Dundee United following a brief delay. Lilley then scored a debut goal salvaged a point at home to Rangers, although he would be sent off in his second game against former club Hearts. Ultimately, it was Lilley's last-minute winner at St Johnstone which saved United from relegation and his six goals in the half-season would cement his status with the fans. The following season, Lilley would manage just six goals, despite a hat-trick against St Johnstone and only two league goals in 2002–03 spelled the end of his time at Tannadice.

A move to Livingston followed in 2003–04 and a rejuvenated Lilley scored 12 league goals, plus four in the Scottish League Cup – including the winning goal in the semi-final against Dundee and one in the final win against Hibernian – and a hat-trick in the Scottish Cup against Spartans. This earned him the nickname of "The Goal Machine."

In May 2004 he joined Boston United, signing a three-year contract. However his wife failed to settle in Lincolnshire, so in July he re-signed for Livingston, after the club gained special permission from the Scottish Premier League.

2004–05 was less successful, however and Lilley's three goals were not enough to earn him a new contract.

Lilley returned to first club Morton for 2005–06 and managed twelve league goals as Morton narrowly lost in the play-off semi-finals. In 2006–07, he had managed four league goals by the turn of the year.

On 26 January 2007, his contract was terminated by Morton, and he signed for St. Johnstone. After making fourteen appearances for Saints (all as a substitute), Lilley was released by the club at the end of the season. On 7 June 2007, Lilley signed for newly promoted First Division side Stirling Albion. Lilley only played a handful of games for Stirling Albion before being released at the end of the season.

Lilley signed for Forfar Athletic in June 2008, going on to score three goals against East Stirlingshire and Berwick in the league and Partick Thistle in the League Cup, before being released at the end of the 2008–09 season.

== Career statistics ==
| Club performance | | | League | | Cup | | League Cup | | Continental | | Total | |
| Season | Club | League | Apps | Goals | Apps | Goals | Apps | Goals | Apps | Goals | Apps | Goals |
| Scotland | | | League | | Scottish Cup | | League Cup | | Europe | | Total | |
|---|---|---|---|---|---|---|---|---|---|---|---|---|
| 1991–92 | Greenock Morton | Scottish First Division | 25 | 3 | N/A | | N/A | | - | | 25 | 3 |
| 1992–93 | Greenock Morton | Scottish First Division | 22 | 4 | N/A | | N/A | | - | | 22 | 4 |
| 1993–94 | Greenock Morton | Scottish First Division | 38 | 5 | N/A | | N/A | | - | | 38 | 5 |
| 1994–95 | Greenock Morton | Scottish Second Division | 35 | 16 | N/A | | N/A | | - | | 35 | 16 |
| 1995–96 | Greenock Morton | Scottish First Division | 35 | 14 | N/A | | N/A | | - | | 35 | 14 |
| 1996–97 | Greenock Morton | Scottish First Division | 25 | 15 | N/A | | N/A | | - | | 25 | 15 |
| England | | | League | | FA Cup | | League Cup | | Europe | | Total | |
| 1996–97 | Leeds United | Premier League | 6 | 0 | - | | - | | - | | 6 | 0 |
| 1997–98 | Leeds United | Premier League | 12 | 1 | 1 | 0 | 3 | 0 | - | | 16 | 1 |
| 1998–99 | Leeds United | Premier League | 2 | 0 | - | | - | | 1 | 0 | 3 | 0 |
| Scotland | | | League | | Scottish Cup | | League Cup | | Europe | | Total | |
| 1998–99 | Heart of Midlothian (loan) | Scottish Premier League | 4 | 1 | 1 | 0 | - | | - | | 5 | 1 |
| England | | | League | | FA Cup | | League Cup | | Europe | | Total | |
| 1998–99 | Bury (loan) | Football League First Division | 5 | 1 | - | | - | | - | | 5 | 1 |
| 1999–00 | Oxford United | Football League Second Division | 44 | 7 | 5 | 1 | 5 | 0 | - | | 54 | 8 |
| 2000–01 | Oxford United | Football League Second Division | 19 | 2 | 1 | 0 | 2 | 0 | - | | 22 | 2 |
| Scotland | | | League | | Scottish Cup | | League Cup | | Europe | | Total | |
| 2000–01 | Dundee United | Scottish Premier League | 18 | 6 | 4 | 1 | - | | - | | 22 | 7 |
| 2001–02 | Dundee United | Scottish Premier League | 26 | 6 | 4 | 0 | 1 | 0 | - | | 31 | 6 |
| 2002–03 | Dundee United | Scottish Premier League | 33 | 2 | - | | 4 | 2 | - | | 37 | 4 |
| 2003–04 | Livingston | Scottish Premier League | 35 | 12 | 5 | 3 | 5 | 3 | - | | 45 | 18 |
| 2004–05 | Livingston | Scottish Premier League | 31 | 3 | 2 | 0 | 3 | 0 | - | | 36 | 3 |
| 2005–06 | Greenock Morton | Scottish Second Division | 33 | 12 | 2 | 2 | 1 | 1 | - | | 36 | 15 |
| 2006–07 | Greenock Morton | Scottish Second Division | 18 | 4 | - | | 1 | 0 | - | | 19 | 4 |
| 2006–07 | St Johnstone | Scottish First Division | 14 | 0 | - | | - | | - | | 14 | 0 |
| 2007–08 | Stirling Albion | Scottish First Division | 23 | 0 | 1 | 0 | 1 | 0 | - | | 25 | 0 |
| 2008–09 | Forfar Athletic | Scottish Third Division | 22 | 2 | 2 | 0 | 1 | 1 | - | | 25 | 3 |

== Honours ==
=== Livingston ===
- Scottish League Cup: 1

2003–04

=== Greenock Morton ===
- Scottish Second Division: 2

2006–07
1994–95

== See also ==
- Dundee United F.C. season 2000–01
- Dundee United F.C. season 2001–02
- Dundee United F.C. season 2002–03
