= 2001–02 Motherwell F.C. season =

Motherwell
2001–02 season
- Chairman: John Boyle
- Manager: Billy Davies until September 2001; Eric Black; September 2001 – April 2002; Terry Butcher from April 2002
- Premier League: 11th
- Scottish Cup: Third Round
- League Cup: Second Round
- Top goalscorer: League: Stuart Elliott (11); All: Stuart Elliott (12)
Home colours

The 2001–02 season was Motherwell's 4th season in the Scottish Premier League, and their 17th consecutive season in the top division of Scottish football.

Amid growing financial concerns, several key players were sold during the pre-season in order to reduce the club's wage bill. Nine new players were signed, but Motherwell struggled early in the season, resulting in the sacking of manager Billy Davies in September. Eric Black was appointed as his replacement, and over the course the season the club slowly pulled away from bottom-placed St Johnstone to ease any relegation worries. The club's financial situation worsened however, and in April 2002, John Boyle announced that the club would be entering administration. Eric Black and chief executive Pat Nevin resigned from their positions, with Terry Butcher becoming the club's third manager of the season. A week later, following the last game of the season, 19 players were released by the club, including nine players who were still under contract.

== Season review ==
Motherwell announced the signing of David Kelly to a one-year contract on 2 July, with Roberto Martínez signing a day later to a three-year contract.

On 16 March, Franck Bernhard joined Motherwell from RC Strasbourg, whilst Paul Harvey left the club to join Stenhousemuir.

On 29 April, Motherwell released 17 players after going into administration.

== Squad ==
As of match played 12 May 2002

No.	Name	Nationality	Position	Date of birth (age)	Signed from	Signed in	Contract ends	Apps.	Goals
Goalkeepers
17	Stevie Woods	(Scotland)	GK	23 February 1970 (aged 32)	Preston North End	1994			
24	François Dubourdeau	(France)	GK	4 December 1980 (aged 21)	Girondins de Bordeaux	2001		4	0
Defenders
2	Martyn Corrigan	(Scotland)	DF	14 August 1977 (aged 24)	Falkirk	2000		91	1
15	Éric Deloumeaux	(France)	DF	12 May 1973 (aged 29)	Le Havre	2001		24	0
16	Steven Hammell	(Scotland)	DF	18 February 1982 (aged 20)	Youth team	1999		82	1
28	Brian Dempsie	(Scotland)	DF	4 February 1983 (aged 19)	Youth team	1999		1	0
36	William Kinniburgh	(Scotland)	DF	8 September 1984 (aged 17)	Youth team	2000		1	0
Midfielders
8	Scott Leitch	(Scotland)	MF	6 October 1969 (aged 32)	Swindon Town	2000		56	0
11	Stuart Elliott	(Northern Ireland)	MF	23 July 1978 (aged 23)	Glentoran	2000		75	24
12	Derek Adams	(Scotland)	MF	25 June 1975 (aged 26)	Ross County	1998		105	9
20	Dougie Ramsay	(Scotland)	MF	26 April 1979 (aged 23)	Youth team	1997		19	1
22	Keith Lasley	(Scotland)	MF	21 September 1979 (aged 22)	Youth team	1999		43	2
26	Stephen Pearson	(Scotland)	MF	2 October 1982 (aged 19)	Youth team	2000		35	2
29	David Clarke	(Scotland)	MF	22 June 1983 (aged 18)	Youth team	1999		1	0
31	Kevin MacDonald	(Scotland)	MF	5 February 1983 (aged 19)	Youth team	1999		1	0
35	Shaun Fagan	(Scotland)	MF	22 March 1984 (aged 18)	Youth team	1999		2	0
44	Kenny Wright	(Scotland)	MF	1 August 1985 (aged 16)	Youth team	2002		1	0
Forwards
9	Dirk Lehmann	(Germany)	FW	16 August 1971 (aged 30)	Brighton & Hove Albion	2002		11	4
27	James McFadden	(Scotland)	FW	14 April 1983 (aged 19)	Youth team	2000		32	9
45	David Clarkson	(Scotland)	FW	10 September 1985 (aged 16)	Youth team	2002		0	0
Out on loan
Left during the season
1	Mark Brown	(Scotland)	GK	28 February 1981 (aged 21)	Rangers	2001		19	0
3	Andy Dow	(Scotland)	DF	7 February 1973 (aged 29)	Aberdeen	2001		10	1
4	Eddie Forrest	(Scotland)	DF	17 December 1978 (aged 23)	Airdrieonians	2001		15	0
5	Karl Ready	(Wales)	DF	14 August 1972 (aged 29)	Queens Park Rangers	2001		37	4
6	Greg Strong	(England)	DF	5 September 1975 (aged 26)	Bolton Wanderers	2000		77	4
7	Kevin Twaddle	(Scotland)	FW	31 October 1971 (aged 30)	Greenock Morton	1999		67	7
9	David Kelly	(Republic of Ireland)	FW	25 November 1965 (aged 36)	Sheffield United	2001	2002	21	7
10	Roberto Martínez	(Spain)	MF	13 July 1973 (aged 28)	Wigan Athletic	2001		16	0
13	David Ferrère	(France)	MF	30 May 1974 (aged 27)	Louhans-Cuiseaux	2002		10	3
14	Yann Soloy	(France)	MF	15 February 1970 (aged 32)	Le Havre	2001		13	1
18	Stephen Cosgrove	(Scotland)	MF	29 December 1980 (aged 21)	Manchester United	2001		3	0
19	Stevie Nicholas	(Scotland)	FW	8 July 1981 (aged 20)	Stirling Albion	1999		66	5
20	Neil Tarrant	(Scotland)	FW	24 June 1979 (aged 22)	Aston Villa	2001		6	0
21	Paul Harvey	(Scotland)	MF	28 August 1968 (aged 33)	Queen of the South	1999		28	1
23	Ange Oueifio	(Central African Republic)	DF	29 March 1976 (aged 26)	Denderleeuw EH	2000		20	0
25	Jon Connolly	(Scotland)	GK	3 April 1981 (aged 21)	Thorniewood United	2000		2	0
30	Scott Wilson	(Scotland)	DF	20 April 1982 (aged 20)	Youth team	2000		0	0
32	John Fallon	(Scotland)	FW	14 January 1982 (aged 20)	Youth team	1999		0	0
33	Billy Brawley	(Scotland)	MF	19 March 1984 (aged 18)	Youth team	1999		0	0
39	Liam Fleming	(Scotland)	MF		Youth team	2000		0	0
50	Franck Bernhard	(France)	DF	7 March 1976 (aged 26)	RC Strasbourg	2002	2002	3	0
24	Martin Wood	(Scotland)	FW	20 August 1982 (aged 19)	Rothes	1999		9	0

== Transfers ==
=== In ===
Date	Position	Nationality	Name	From	Fee	Ref.
2 July 2001	FW	(Republic of Ireland)	David Kelly	Sheffield United	Free	
3 July 2001	MF	(Spain)	Roberto Martínez	Wigan Athletic	Free	
10 July 2001	DF	(Wales)	Karl Ready	Queens Park Rangers	Free	
20 July 2001	MF	(England)	Stephen Cosgrove	Manchester United	Undisclosed	
20 July 2001	DF	(Scotland)	Eddie Forrest	Airdrieonians	Undisclosed	
9 November 2001	DF	(France)	Éric Deloumeaux	Le Havre	£100,000	
18 January 2002	FW	(Germany)	Dirk Lehmann	Brighton & Hove Albion	Undisclosed	
8 February 2002	MF	(France)	David Ferrère	Louhans-Cuiseaux	Undisclosed	
16 March 2002	DF	(France)	Franck Bernhard	RC Strasbourg	Undisclosed	

=== Out ===
Date	Position	Nationality	Name	To	Fee	Ref.
16 March 2002	MF	(Scotland)	Paul Harvey	Stenhousemuir	Free	

=== Released ===
Date	Position	Nationality	Name	Joined	Date	Ref.
	FW	(Republic of Ireland)	David Kelly	Mansfield Town	29 January 2002	
	GK	(Scotland)	Jon Connolly	Dumbarton	31 January 2002	
29 April 2002	DF	(France)	Franck Bernhard	Vendée Fontenay	2003	
29 April 2002	MF	(Scotland)	Billy Brawley	Partick Thistle	21 June 2002	
29 April 2002	FW	(Scotland)	John Fallon			
29 April 2002	MF	(France)	David Ferrère	L'Entente SSG	2003	
29 April 2002	MF	(Scotland)	Liam Fleming			
29 April 2002	MF	(Scotland)	Stevie Nicholas	Stirling Albion	2002	
29 April 2002	DF	(Central African Republic)	Ange Oueifio	1. FC Schweinfurt 05	2002	
29 April 2002	MF	(France)	Yann Soloy	Dieppe	2002	
29 April 2002	DF	(Scotland)	Scott Wilson	Airdrie United	2002	
29 April 2002	FW	(Scotland)	Martin Wood			
29 April 2002	GK	(Scotland)	Mark Brown	Inverness Caledonian Thistle	2002	
29 April 2002	MF	(Scotland)	Stephen Cosgrove	Clyde	2002	
29 April 2002	DF	(Scotland)	Andy Dow	St Mirren	2002	
29 April 2002	DF	(Scotland)	Eddie Forrest	Berwick Rangers	2002	
29 April 2002	MF	(Spain)	Roberto Martínez	Walsall	August 2002	
29 April 2002		(Scotland)	Brian MacDonald			
29 April 2002	DF	(Wales)	Karl Ready	Aldershot Town	2002	
29 April 2002	DF	(England)	Greg Strong	Hull City	May 2002	
29 April 2002	FW	(Scotland)	Kevin Twaddle	Hearts	June 2002	

== Competitions ==
=== Overview ===
Competition	First match	Last match	Starting round	Final position	Record							
Competition	First match	Last match	Starting round	Final position	Pld	W	D	L	GF	GA	GD	Win %
Premier League	28 July 2001	12 May 2002	Matchday 1	11th	38	11	7	20	49	69	−20	28.95
Scottish Cup	5 January 2002	5 January 2002	Third Round	Third Round	1	0	0	1	1	3	−2	0.00
League Cup	25 September 2001	25 September 2001	Second Round	Second Round	1	0	0	1	1	2	−1	0.00
Total					40	11	7	22	51	74	−23	27.50

Last updated: 12 May 2002
Source: Competitions

=== Premier League ===
==== League table ====
Pos	Team	Pld	W	D	L	GF	GA	GD	Pts	Qualification or relegation (Note: Teams played each other three times (33 matches), before the league split into two groups (the top six and the bottom six) for the last five matches.)
8	Dundee United	38	12	10	16	38	59	−21	46	
9	Dundee	38	12	8	18	41	55	−14	44	
10	Hibernian	38	10	11	17	51	56	−5	41	
11	Motherwell	38	11	7	20	49	69	−20	40	
12	St Johnstone (R)	38	5	6	27	24	62	−38	21	Relegation to the First Division

Source: Scottish Professional Football League
Rules for classification: (1) Points; (2) Goal difference; (3) Goals scored
(R) Relegated

==== Results summary ====
Overall								Home						Away					
Pld	W	D	L	GF	GA	GD	Pts	W	D	L	GF	GA	GD	W	D	L	GF	GA	GD
38	11	7	20	49	69	−20	40	8	5	6	30	25	+5	3	2	14	19	44	−25

Source: See Results

==== Results by round ====
Round	1	2	3	4	5	6	7	8	9	10	11	12	13	14	15	16	17	18	19	20	21	22	23	24	25	26	27	28	29	30	31	32	33	34	35	36	37	38
Ground	A	H	H	A	H	H	A	H	A	H	A	A	H	A	A	H	A	A	H	A	H	A	H	H	A	H	H	H	A	H	A	A	H	H	A	A	A	H
Result	L	D	D	L	D	L	L	W	W	L	D	L	W	L	L	W	L	D	D	L	L	L	W	W	L	W	L	W	L	L	W	L	L	D	L	L	W	W
Position	10	10	10	11	11	11	12	11	10	11	11	11	10	11	11	11	11	11	11	11	11	11	11	10	10	9	10	9	10	10	9	10	10	11	11	11	11	11

Source: See Results
A = Away; H = Home; W = Win; D = Draw; L = Loss

==== Results ====
28 July 2001 1	Dunfermline Athletic	5–2	Motherwell	Dunfermline
BST (UTC+1)	de Gier 8', 59'; Nicholson 46', 70'; Bullen 56'		Kelly 25' (pen.); Adams 79'; Ready (yellow card)	Stadium: East End Park; Referee: John Rowbotham

4 August 2001 2	Motherwell	0–0	Dundee United	Motherwell
BST (UTC+1)	Ready (yellow card); Tarrant (yellow card)	Report	Partridge (yellow card); McIntyre (yellow card)	Stadium: Fir Park; Referee: Garry Mitchell

12 August 2001 3	Motherwell	2–2	Kilmarnock	Motherwell
BST (UTC+1)	Dow 13'; Elliott 90' (yellow card); Ready (yellow card); Martínez (yellow card); Leitch (yellow card)		Ngonge 7' (yellow card) (yellow-red card) 37'; Mitchell 82'; Innes (yellow card)	Stadium: Fir Park; Referee: Tom Brown

18 August 2001 4	Aberdeen	4–2	Motherwell	Aberdeen
BST (UTC+1)	Thornley 20'; Winters 34'; Mackie 55' (yellow card); Zerouali 75'; Guntveit (yellow card)		Ready 29'; Kelly 31' (yellow card); Strong (yellow card); Martínez (yellow card); Elliott (yellow card)	Stadium: Pittodrie; Referee: David Somers

25 August 2001 5	Motherwell	0–0	Livingston	Motherwell
BST (UTC+1)	Leitch (yellow card)			Stadium: Fir Park; Attendance: 4,828; Referee: Bobby Orr

8 September 2001 6	Motherwell	1–3	Hibernian	Motherwell
BST (UTC+1)	Kelly 15' (pen.); Twaddle (yellow card); Nicholas (yellow card)		Sauzée 17' (pen.), 50'; Fenwick 66' (yellow card); Jack (yellow card); O'Neil (yellow card)	Stadium: Fir Park; Attendance: 5,784; Referee: Stuart Dougal

16 September 2001 7	Rangers	3–0	Motherwell	Glasgow
BST (UTC+1)	Flo 37' de Boer 70'; Caniggia 90'; Ross (yellow card)		Strong (yellow card); Corrigan (yellow card); Ready (yellow card); Martínez (yellow card); Leitch (yellow card); Pearson (yellow card)	Stadium: Ibrox Stadium; Attendance: 41,137; Referee: Mike McCurry

22 September 2001 8	Motherwell	2–0	Hearts	Motherwell
BST (UTC+1)	Kelly 38'; Elliott 72'; Lasley (yellow card); Nicholas (yellow card); Twaddle (yellow card)		McCann (yellow card); Simmons (yellow card) 82'	Stadium: Fir Park; Referee: Garry Mitchell

29 September 2001 9	St Johnstone	2–3	Motherwell	Perth
BST (UTC+1)	Connolly 13'; MacDonald 55'; Weir (yellow card); Parker (yellow card)		Nicholas 45', 90'; Elliott 79'	Stadium: McDiarmid Park; Referee: Hugh Dallas

13 October 2001 10	Motherwell	1–2	Celtic	Motherwell
BST (UTC+1)	Strong 68'; Forrest (yellow card); Pearson (yellow card); Kelly (yellow card)	Report	Moravčík 14'; Larsson 88' (pen.); Sylla (yellow card); Lennon (yellow card)	Stadium: Fir Park; Referee: John Rowbotham

27 October 2001 11	Dundee United	1–1	Motherwell	Dundee
BST (UTC+1)	Easton 23'; Lauchlan (yellow card)		Kelly 50'; Corrigan (yellow card); Ready (yellow card)	Stadium: Tannadice Park; Referee: Kenny Clark

30 October 2001 12	Dundee	3–1	Motherwell	Dundee
GMT (UTC)	Sara 32'; Ketsbaia 55'; Caballero 62'; Carranza (yellow card)		Ready 45'	Stadium: Dens Park; Referee: Kevin Toner

3 November 2001 13	Motherwell	1–0	Dunfermline Athletic	Motherwell
GMT (UTC)	Strong 16'; Hammell (yellow card)		Rossi (yellow card); Dair (yellow card); Ferguson (yellow card); Nicholson (yellow card)	Stadium: Fir Park; Referee: Alan Freeland

10 November 2001 14	Aberdeen	1–0	Motherwell	Aberdeen
GMT (UTC)	Dadi 7'		Leitch (yellow card)	Stadium: Pittodrie; Referee: Willie Young

17 November 2001 15	Kilmarnock	2–0	Motherwell	Kilmarnock
GMT (UTC)	Boyd 40' di Giacomo 77'; Cocard (yellow card)		Adams (yellow card)	Stadium: Rugby Park; Referee: Stuart Dougal

24 November 2001 16	Motherwell	3–2	Aberdeen	Motherwell
GMT (UTC)	Pearson 8' (yellow card); Elliott 18' (yellow card); McFadden 83'; Strong (yellow card); Ready (yellow card); Adams (yellow card); Lasley (yellow card)		Winters 40'; Zerouali 79'; Tiernan (yellow card)	Stadium: Fir Park; Referee: Kevin Toner

1 December 2001 17	Livingston	3–1	Motherwell	Livingston
GMT (UTC)	Xausa 20', 40'; Hammell 23' (o.g.); Rubio (yellow card)		McFadden 78'; Deloumeaux (yellow card); Leitch (yellow card); Pearson (yellow card)	Stadium: Almondvale Stadium; Referee: Hugh Dallas

8 December 2001 18	Hibernian	1–1	Motherwell	Edinburgh
GMT (UTC)	O'Neil 7'		Elliott 83'; Strong (yellow card); Ready (yellow card); Lasley (yellow card); Soloy (yellow card)	Stadium: Easter Road; Referee: David Somers

15 December 2001 19	Motherwell	2–2	Rangers	Motherwell
GMT (UTC)	Lasley 16'; Kelly 80' (pen.) (yellow card); Leitch (yellow card); McFadden (yellow card); Corrigan (yellow card)		Arveladze 38' de Boer 63'; Moore (yellow card) (yellow-red card) 89'; Ricksen (yellow card)	Stadium: Fir Park; Referee: Willie Young

22 December 2001 20	Hearts	3–1	Motherwell	Edinburgh
GMT (UTC)	Fuller 54', 79' (yellow card); McKenna 64'		Elliott 20'; Forrest (yellow card) (yellow-red card) 60'; Hammell (yellow card); Lasley (yellow card); McFadden (yellow card)	Stadium: Tynecastle; Referee: Ian Fyfe

26 December 2001 21	Motherwell	1–2	St Johnstone	Motherwell
GMT (UTC)	McFadden 90'		Murray 9'; MacDonald 38' (yellow card); Forsyth (red card) 57'	Stadium: Fir Park; Referee: John Rowbotham

2 January 2002 22	Celtic	2–0	Motherwell	Glasgow
GMT (UTC)	Larsson 81'; Hartson 90'; Thompson (yellow card)		Corrigan (yellow card); Ready (yellow card); Kelly (yellow card); McFadden (yellow card)	Stadium: Celtic Park; Referee: Alan Freeland

9 January 2002 23	Motherwell	4–2	Dundee	Motherwell
GMT (UTC)	McFadden 9', 87' (yellow card); Ready 26'; Elliott 70'		Sara 34' (pen.); Kemas 90'; Smith (yellow card); Zhiyi (yellow card)	Stadium: Fir Park; Referee: Kenny Clark

12 January 2002 24	Motherwell	2–0	Dundee United	Motherwell
GMT (UTC)	McFadden 51' (yellow card); Hammell 80'		Lilley (yellow card)	Stadium: Fir Park; Referee: Tom Brown

19 January 2002 25	Dunfermline Athletic	3–1	Motherwell	Dunfermline
GMT (UTC)	Skerla 25'; Mason 49'; Bullen 59'; Panopoulos (yellow card)		McFadden 77'; Leitch (yellow card); Lasley (yellow card)	Stadium: East End Park; Referee: Stuart Dougal

23 January 2002 26	Motherwell	2–0	Kilmarnock	Motherwell
GMT (UTC)	McFadden 13' (yellow card); Lehmann 27' (yellow card); Hammell (yellow card); Ready (yellow card); Leitch (yellow card)		McGowne (yellow card); Murray (yellow card)	Stadium: Fir Park; Referee: Garry Mitchell

2 February 2002 27	Motherwell	1–2	Livingston	Motherwell
GMT (UTC)	Soloy 38'; Strong (yellow card)		Andrews 45'; Quino 71' (yellow card); Rubio (yellow card); Hart (yellow card); Lowndes (yellow card)	Stadium: Fir Park; Referee: Mike McCurry

9 February 2002 28	Motherwell	4–0	Hibernian	Motherwell
GMT (UTC)	Ferrère 53', 66', 81'; Lehmann 73'		Colgan (yellow card); Smith (yellow card)	Stadium: Fir Park; Referee: Stuart Dougal

16 February 2002 29	Rangers	3–0	Motherwell	Glasgow
GMT (UTC)	Latapy 14'; Flo 41'; Ricksen 85'		Deloumeaux (yellow card) (yellow-red card) 60'; Ready (yellow card)	Stadium: Ibrox Stadium; Referee: Willie Young

2 March 2002 30	Motherwell	1–2	Hearts	Motherwell
GMT (UTC)	Lasley 55'; Leitch (yellow card)		Severin 23'; Sloan 82'; Maybury (yellow card); Boyack (yellow card)	Stadium: Fir Park; Referee: Bobby Orr

9 March 2002 31	St Johnstone	0–2	Motherwell	Perth
GMT (UTC)	Murray (yellow card); McCluskey (yellow card); Forsyth (yellow card)		McFadden 10' (pen.); Lehmann 62'; Corrigan (yellow card)	Stadium: McDiarmid Park; Referee: Douglas McDonald

16 March 2002 32	Dundee	2–0	Motherwell	Dundee
GMT (UTC)	Ketsbaia 5', 26' del Río (yellow card)		Ferrère (yellow card); McFadden (yellow card); Adams (yellow card)	Stadium: Dens Park; Referee: Tom Brown

19 March 2002 33	Motherwell	0–4	Celtic	Motherwell
GMT (UTC)	Pearson (red card) 56'		Lambert 10'; Larsson 53', 61' (pen.); Mjällby 78'; Guppy (yellow card)	Stadium: Fir Park; Referee: Stuart Dougal

6 April 2002 34	Motherwell	1–1	St Johnstone	Motherwell
BST (UTC+1)	Elliott 70'		Hartley 22'	Stadium: Fir Park; Referee: Kenny Clark

13 April 2002 35	Dundee United	1–0	Motherwell	Dundee
BST (UTC+1)	Thompson 67'		Ready (yellow card); Adams (yellow card)	Stadium: Tannadice Park; Referee: Charlie Richmond

21 April 2002 36	Hibernian	4–0	Motherwell	Edinburgh
BST (UTC+1)	Townsley 27'; Arpinon 45'; O'Connor 81', 85'; Hilland (yellow card)		Corrigan (yellow card); McFadden (yellow card)	Stadium: Easter Road; Referee: Alan Freeland

27 April 2002 37	Kilmarnock	1–4	Motherwell	Kilmarnock
BST (UTC+1)	Johnson 68'; Dargo (yellow card)		Adams 21'; McFadden 70'; Elliott 72'; Pearson 74'; Ready (yellow card); Adams (yellow card); McFadden (yellow card)	Stadium: Rugby Park; Referee: Garry Mitchell

12 May 2002 38	Motherwell	2–1	Dundee	Motherwell
BST (UTC+1)	Lehmann 15'; Elliott 44'		Caballero 66' (pen.)	Stadium: Fir Park; Referee: Willie Young

=== Scottish Cup ===
5 January 2002 Third round	Dunfermline Athletic	3–1	Motherwell	Dunfermline
	Crawford 22', 46'; Thomson 38'		Elliott 80'; Adams (yellow card); Pearson (yellow card)	Stadium: East End Park; Referee: John Underhill

=== League Cup ===
25 September 2001 Second Round	Airdrieonians	2–1	Motherwell	Airdrie
	Coyle 12' (pen.); Lasley 85' (o.g.); A.Smith (yellow card)		Kelly 56'; Forrest (yellow card); Corrigan (yellow card); Leitch (yellow card)	Stadium: Excelsior Stadium; Referee: Kevin Toner

== Squad statistics ==
As of match played 12 May 2002

=== Appearances ===
No.	Pos	Nat	Player	Total		Premier League		Scottish Cup		League Cup	
No.	Pos	Nat	Player	Apps	Goals	Apps	Goals	Apps	Goals	Apps	Goals
2	DF	(Scotland) SCO	Martyn Corrigan	32	0	26+4	0	1	0	1	0
8	MF	(Scotland) SCO	Scott Leitch	27	0	26	0	0	0	1	0
9	FW	(Germany) GER	Dirk Lehmann	11	4	10+1	4	0	0	0	0
11	MF	(Northern Ireland) NIR	Stuart Elliott	39	12	30+7	11	0+1	1	1	0
12	FW	(Scotland) SCO	Derek Adams	30	2	19+9	2	1	0	0+1	0
15	DF	(France) FRA	Éric Deloumeaux	24	0	22+1	0	1	0	0	0
16	DF	(Scotland) SCO	Steven Hammell	40	1	37+1	1	1	0	1	0
17	GK	(Scotland) SCO	Stevie Woods	18	0	15+1	0	1	0	1	0
20	MF	(Scotland) SCO	Dougie Ramsay	3	0	2+1	0	0	0	0	0
22	MF	(Scotland) SCO	Keith Lasley	30	1	25+3	1	1	0	1	0
24	GK	(France) FRA	François Dubourdeau	4	0	4	0	0	0	0	0
26	MF	(Scotland) SCO	Stephen Pearson	29	2	19+8	2	0+1	0	1	0
27	FW	(Scotland) SCO	James McFadden	25	9	20+4	9	1	0	0	0
29	MF	(Scotland) SCO	David Clarke	1	0	0+1	0	0	0	0	0
31	MF	(Scotland) SCO	Kevin MacDonald	1	0	0+1	0	0	0	0	0
35	MF	(Scotland) SCO	Shaun Fagan	2	0	0+2	0	0	0	0	0
36	DF	(Scotland) SCO	William Kinniburgh	1	0	1	0	0	0	0	0
44	MF	(Scotland) SCO	Kenny Wright	1	0	0+1	0	0	0	0	0
Players who appeared for Motherwell who left during the season:
1	GK	(Scotland) SCO	Mark Brown	19	0	19	0	0	0	0	0
3	DF	(Scotland) SCO	Andy Dow	10	1	7+2	1	1	0	0	0
4	DF	(Scotland) SCO	Eddie Forrest	15	0	9+4	0	0+1	0	1	0
5	DF	(Wales) WAL	Karl Ready	37	4	35+1	4	0	0	1	0
6	DF	(England) ENG	Greg Strong	33	2	31+1	2	1	0	0	0
7	FW	(Scotland) SCO	Kevin Twaddle	12	0	7+5	0	0	0	0	0
9	FW	(Republic of Ireland) IRL	David Kelly	21	7	19	6	1	0	1	1
10	MF	(Spain) ESP	Roberto Martínez	16	0	8+8	0	0	0	0	0
13	MF	(France) FRA	David Ferrère	10	3	7+3	3	0	0	0	0
14	MF	(France) FRA	Yann Soloy	13	1	11+1	1	1	0	0	0
18	MF	(Scotland) SCO	Stephen Cosgrove	3	0	0+2	0	0	0	0+1	0
19	FW	(Scotland) SCO	Stevie Nicholas	16	2	5+10	2	0	0	1	0
20	FW	(Scotland) SCO	Neil Tarrant	6	0	2+3	0	0	0	0+1	0
21	MF	(Scotland) SCO	Paul Harvey	2	0	0+2	0	0	0	0	0
50	DF	(France) FRA	Franck Bernhard	3	0	2+1	0	0	0	0	0

=== Goal scorers ===
Ranking	Position	Nation	Number	Name	Premier League	Scottish Cup	League Cup	Total
1	MF	(Northern Ireland)	11	Stuart Elliott	11	1	0	12
2	FW	(Scotland)	27	James McFadden	9	0	0	9
3	FW	(Republic of Ireland)	9	David Kelly	6	0	1	7
4	FW	(Germany)	9	Dirk Lehmann	4	0	0	4
4	DF	(Wales)	5	Karl Ready	4	0	0	4
6	MF	(France)	13	David Ferrère	3	0	0	3
7	FW	(Scotland)	19	Stevie Nicholas	2	0	0	2
7	MF	(Scotland)	26	Stephen Pearson	2	0	0	2
7	DF	(England)	6	Greg Strong	2	0	0	2
7	MF	(Scotland)	12	Derek Adams	2	0	0	2
11	MF	(Scotland)	22	Keith Lasley	1	0	0	1
11	DF	(Scotland)	3	Andy Dow	1	0	0	1
11	DF	(Scotland)	16	Steven Hammell	1	0	0	1
11	MF	(France)	14	Yann Soloy	1	0	0	1
TOTALS					49	1	1	51

=== Clean sheets ===
Ranking	Position	Nation	Number	Name	Premier League	Scottish Cup	League Cup	Total
1	GK	(Scotland)	1	Mark Brown	4	0	0	4
1	GK	(Scotland)	17	Stevie Woods	4	0	0	4
TOTALS					8	0	0	8

=== Disciplinary record ===
Number	Nation	Position	Name	Premier League		Scottish Cup		League Cup		Total	
Number	Nation	Position	Name	Yellow card	Red card	Yellow card	Red card	Yellow card	Red card	Yellow card	Red card
2	(Scotland)	DF	Martyn Corrigan	6	0	0	0	1	0	7	0
8	(Scotland)	MF	Scott Leitch	9	0	0	0	1	0	10	0
9	(Germany)	FW	Dirk Lehmann	1	0	0	0	0	0	1	0
11	(Northern Ireland)	MF	Stuart Elliott	3	0	0	0	0	0	3	0
12	(Scotland)	MF	Derek Adams	5	0	1	0	0	0	6	0
15	(France)	DF	Éric Deloumeaux	3	1	0	0	0	0	3	1
16	(Scotland)	DF	Steven Hammell	3	0	0	0	0	0	3	0
22	(Scotland)	MF	Keith Lasley	5	0	0	0	0	0	5	0
26	(Scotland)	MF	Stephen Pearson	4	1	1	0	0	0	5	1
27	(Scotland)	FW	James McFadden	9	0	0	0	0	0	9	0
Players away on loan:
Players who left Motherwell during the season:
4	(Scotland)	DF	Eddie Forrest	3	1	0	0	1	0	4	1
5	(Wales)	DF	Karl Ready	12	0	0	0	0	0	12	0
6	(England)	DF	Greg Strong	5	0	0	0	0	0	5	0
7	(Scotland)	FW	Kevin Twaddle	2	0	0	0	0	0	2	0
9	(Republic of Ireland)	FW	David Kelly	4	0	0	0	0	0	4	0
10	(Spain)	MF	Roberto Martínez	3	0	0	0	0	0	3	0
13	(France)	MF	David Ferrère	1	0	0	0	0	0	1	0
14	(France)	MF	Yann Soloy	1	0	0	0	0	0	1	0
19	(Scotland)	FW	Stevie Nicholas	2	0	0	0	0	0	2	0
20	(Scotland)	FW	Neil Tarrant	1	0	0	0	0	0	1	0
			TOTALS	82	3	2	0	3	0	87	3

== See also ==
- List of Motherwell F.C. seasons
