= Cosgrove =

Cosgrove may refer to:

== People ==
- Bill Cosgrove (1918–1943), Australian rules footballer
- Brian Cosgrove (born 1934), British animator, producer, and director
- Clayton Cosgrove (born 1969), New Zealand politician
- Daniel Cosgrove (born 1970), American actor
- Denis Cosgrove (1948–2008), British geographer
- Frank J. Cosgrove (1914–1980), American politician
- Gertrude Cosgrove (1882–1962), Australian activist
- Hazel Cosgrove, Lady Cosgrove (born 1946), Scottish lawyer and judge
- Henry Cosgrove (1834–1906), American Roman Catholic bishop
- Henry Cosgrove (judge) (1922–2010), Australian judge
- Jack Cosgrove (disambiguation), several people
- James Cosgrove (comedian), English comedian
- James Cosgrove (politician) (1861–1911), American politician
- John Cosgrove (disambiguation), several people
- Kevin Cosgrove (1955–2001), American business executive
- Mark Cosgrove (born 1984), Australian cricketer
- Mike Cosgrove (born 1951), American baseball player
- Mike Cosgrove (footballer) (1901–1972), Scottish footballer
- Mike Cosgrove, American drummer, member of Alien Ant Farm
- Miranda Cosgrove (born 1993), American actress
- Paul Cosgrove (born 1934), Canadian politician and jurist
- Peter Cosgrove (born 1947), Retired Australian army general, Australian Governor-General 2014-2019
- Robert Cosgrove (1884–1969), Australian politician
- Samuel G. Cosgrove (1847–1909) American politician and sixth governor of the Washington
- Stephen Cosgrove (footballer) (born 1980), Scottish footballer
- Stephen Cosgrove (writer) (born 1945), American children's writer
- Stuart Cosgrove (born 1952), Scottish broadcaster, journalist and television executive
- Toby Cosgrove (born 1940), American surgeon
- William Cosgrove (1888–1936), Irish soldier

== Places ==
- Cosgrove, Northamptonshire, England
- Cosgrove, Queensland, Australia
- Cosgrove, Victoria, Australia
- Cosgrove, Arkansas, United States
- Cosgrove, Iowa, United States

== Fictional characters ==
- Ken Cosgrove, account executive on Mad Men
- Sergeant Mike Cosgrove, a character from Freakazoid!
- Dave Kosgrove, a character from South Beach Tow

== See also ==
- Cosgrave
- Clann Cosgraigh
