= William Cosgrove (disambiguation) =

William Cosgrove (1888–1936) was an Irish recipient of the Victoria Cross.

William Cosgrove may also refer to:

- William Cosgrove (golfer) (1855–1927), Scottish professional golfer
- William Michael Cosgrove, American Roman Catholic bishop.
- Bill Cosgrove (1918–1943), Australian rules footballer

== See also ==
- W. T. Cosgrave (William Thomas Cosgrave, 1880–1965), leader of the Irish Free State from 1922 to 1932
- Cosgrove (disambiguation)
