= Cosgrave =

Cosgrave is an Irish surname. Notable people with the surname include:

- Fran Cosgrave (born 1977), Irish nightclub owner
- James Cosgrave (1865–1936), Irish politician
- James Cosgrave (cricketer) (born 1932), Australian cricketer
- John B. Cosgrave (born 1946), Irish mathematician
- Lawrence Moore Cosgrave (1890–1971), Canadian soldier and diplomat
- Liam Cosgrave (1920–2017), Irish politician, fifth Taoiseach
- Liam T. Cosgrave (born 1956), Irish politician
- Michael Joe Cosgrave (1938–2022), Irish politician
- Niamh Cosgrave (born 1964), Irish politician
- Philip Cosgrave (1884–1923), Irish politician
- W. A. Cosgrave (1879–1952), British civil servant in India
- W. T. Cosgrave (1880–1965), Irish politician, President of the Executive Council of the Irish Free State from 1922 to 1932

== See also ==
- Cosgrove (disambiguation)
