= 2009–10 Scottish Premier League =

104th season of top-tier football league in Scotland

Scottish Premier League
- Season: 2009–10
- Dates: 15 August 2009 – 9 May 2010
- Champions: Rangers; 6th Premier League title 53rd Scottish title
- Runner up: Celtic
- Relegated: Falkirk
- Champions League: Rangers; Celtic
- Europa League: Dundee United; Hibernian; Motherwell
- Matches: 228
- Goals: 586 (2.57 per match)
- Top goalscorer: Kris Boyd (23)
- Biggest home win: Rangers 7–1 Dundee United
- Biggest away win: Nine wins by three clear goals
- Highest scoring: Motherwell 6–6 Hibernian (12)
- Highest attendance: Celtic v St Johnstone: 58,500; Celtic v Dundee United: 58,500
- Lowest attendance: Hamilton Academical v Heart of Midlothian: 2,003
- Average attendance: Rangers: 47,564

The 2009–10 Scottish Premier League season was the twelfth season of the Scottish Premier League. Rangers were the defending champions and they retained the championship with three games to spare by winning 1–0 against Hibernian at Easter Road on 25 April. The competition began on 15 August 2009 and ended on 9 May 2010.

== Clubs ==
=== Promotion and relegation from 2008–09 ===
Promoted from First Division to Premier League

- St Johnstone

Relegated from Premier League to First Division

- Inverness Caledonian Thistle

=== Stadia and locations ===
| Aberdeen | Celtic | Dundee United | Falkirk |
|---|---|---|---|
| Pittodrie Stadium | Celtic Park | Tannadice Park | Falkirk Stadium |
| Capacity: 20,866 | Capacity: 60,411 | Capacity: 14,223 | Capacity: 7,937 |
| Hamilton Academical | Location of teams in 2009–10 Scottish Premier League | | Heart of Midlothian |
| New Douglas Park | Location of teams in 2009–10 Scottish Premier League | | Tynecastle Park |
| Capacity: 5,510 | Location of teams in 2009–10 Scottish Premier League | | Capacity: 17,420 |
| Hibernian | Location of teams in 2009–10 Scottish Premier League | | Kilmarnock |
| Easter Road | Location of teams in 2009–10 Scottish Premier League | | Rugby Park |
| Capacity: 16,531 | Location of teams in 2009–10 Scottish Premier League | | Capacity: 17,889 |
| Motherwell | Rangers | St Johnstone | St Mirren |
| Fir Park | Ibrox Stadium | McDiarmid Park | St Mirren Park |
| Capacity: 13,677 | Capacity: 50,817 | Capacity: 10,696 | Capacity: 8,023 |

=== Personnel and kits ===
| Team | Manager | Kit manufacturer | Kit sponsor |
|---|---|---|---|
| Aberdeen | (Scotland) Mark McGhee | Nike | Team Recruitment |
| Celtic | (Northern Ireland) Neil Lennon | Nike | Carling |
| Dundee United | (Scotland) Peter Houston | Nike | Carbrini |
| Falkirk | (Scotland) Steven Pressley | Puma | Central Demolition |
| Hamilton Academical | (Scotland) Billy Reid | Nike | Reid Furniture |
| Heart of Midlothian | (Scotland) Jim Jefferies | Umbro | Ukio Bankas |
| Hibernian | (Scotland) John Hughes | Le Coq Sportif | McEwan Fraser |
| Kilmarnock | (Scotland) Jimmy Calderwood | 1869 | Smallworld |
| Motherwell | (Scotland) Craig Brown | Canterbury of New Zealand | JAXX |
| Rangers | (Scotland) Walter Smith | Umbro | Carling |
| St Johnstone | (Scotland) Derek McInnes | Surridge | Taylor Wimpey |
| St Mirren | (Scotland) Gus MacPherson | hummel | Braehead Shopping Centre |

==== Managerial changes ====
| Team | Outgoing manager | Date of vacancy | Manner of departure | Position in table | Incoming manager | Date of appointment |
|---|---|---|---|---|---|---|
| Aberdeen | (Scotland) Jimmy Calderwood | 24 May 2009 | Resigned | Pre-season | (Scotland) Mark McGhee | 12 June 2009 |
| Celtic | (Scotland) Gordon Strachan | 25 May 2009 | Resigned | Pre-season | (England) Tony Mowbray | 16 June 2009 |
| Hibernian | (Finland) Mixu Paatelainen | 29 May 2009 | Resigned | Pre-season | (Scotland) John Hughes | 8 June 2009 |
| Falkirk | (Scotland) John Hughes | 8 June 2009 | Joined Hibernian | Pre-season | (Scotland) Eddie May | 23 June 2009 |
| Motherwell | (Scotland) Mark McGhee | 12 June 2009 | Joined Aberdeen | Pre-season | (Republic of Ireland) Jim Gannon | 27 June 2009 |
| Dundee United | (Scotland) Craig Levein | 23 December 2009 | Joined Scotland | 4th | (Scotland) Peter Houston | 23 December 2009 (interim); 25 May 2010 (permanent) |
| Motherwell | (Republic of Ireland) Jim Gannon | 28 December 2009 | Sacked | 6th | (Scotland) Craig Brown | 29 December 2009(interim); 27 January 2010 (permanent) |
| Kilmarnock | (Scotland) Jim Jefferies | 11 January 2010 | Mutual consent | 11th | (Scotland) Jimmy Calderwood | 14 January 2010 |
| Heart of Midlothian | (Hungary) Csaba László | 29 January 2010 | Sacked | 5th | (Scotland) Jim Jefferies | 29 January 2010 |
| Falkirk | (Scotland) Eddie May | 11 February 2010 | Sacked | 12th | (Scotland) Steven Pressley | 11 February 2010 |
| Celtic | (England) Tony Mowbray | 25 March 2010 | Sacked | 2nd | (Northern Ireland) Neil Lennon | 25 March 2010 (interim); 9 June 2010 (permanent) |

== Events ==
- 21 April – Inverness Caledonian Thistle won promotion to the Scottish Premier League as First Division champions following a 1–0 defeat for their nearest challengers Dundee against Raith Rovers.
- 25 April – Rangers clinch the championship by winning 1–0 against Hibernian at Easter Road.
- 5 May – The 6–6 draw between Motherwell and Hibernian at Fir Park breaks the SPL record for the most goals scored in a single SPL match.
- 8 May – Falkirk were relegated after goalless draw against Kilmarnock at Rugby Park.

== League table ==
| Pos | Team | Pld | W | D | L | GF | GA | GD | Pts | Qualification or relegation |
|---|---|---|---|---|---|---|---|---|---|---|
| 1 | Rangers (C) | 38 | 26 | 9 | 3 | 82 | 28 | +54 | 87 | Qualification for the Champions League group stage |
| 2 | Celtic | 38 | 25 | 6 | 7 | 75 | 39 | +36 | 81 | Qualification for the Champions League third qualifying round |
| 3 | Dundee United | 38 | 17 | 12 | 9 | 55 | 47 | +8 | 63 | Qualification for the Europa League play-off round (Note: by winning the Scottish Cup.) |
| 4 | Hibernian | 38 | 15 | 9 | 14 | 58 | 55 | +3 | 54 | Qualification for the Europa League third qualifying round |
| 5 | Motherwell | 38 | 13 | 14 | 11 | 52 | 54 | −2 | 53 | Qualification for the Europa League second qualifying round |
| 6 | Heart of Midlothian | 38 | 13 | 9 | 16 | 35 | 46 | −11 | 48 | |
| 7 | Hamilton Academical | 38 | 13 | 10 | 15 | 39 | 46 | −7 | 49 | |
| 8 | St Johnstone | 38 | 12 | 11 | 15 | 57 | 61 | −4 | 47 | |
| 9 | Aberdeen | 38 | 10 | 11 | 17 | 36 | 52 | −16 | 41 | |
| 10 | St Mirren | 38 | 7 | 13 | 18 | 36 | 49 | −13 | 34 | |
| 11 | Kilmarnock | 38 | 8 | 9 | 21 | 29 | 51 | −22 | 33 | |
| 12 | Falkirk (R) | 38 | 6 | 13 | 19 | 31 | 57 | −26 | 31 | Relegation to the First Division |

Source: SPFL Archive
Rules for classification: 1) points; 2) goal difference; 3) number of goals scored.
(C) Champions; (R) Relegated

== Results ==
=== Matches 1–22 ===
During their first 22 matches, each team played every other team home and away.

| Home \ Away | ABE | CEL | DUN | FAL | HAM | HOM | HIB | KIL | MOT | RAN | STJ | STM |
|---|---|---|---|---|---|---|---|---|---|---|---|---|
| Aberdeen | | 1–3 | 0–2 | 0–1 | 1–2 | 1–1 | 0–2 | 1–0 | 0–0 | 1–0 | 2–1 | 1–0 |
| Celtic | 1–0 | | 1–1 | 1–1 | 2–0 | 2–1 | 1–2 | 3–0 | 0–0 | 1–1 | 5–2 | 3–1 |
| Dundee United | 0–1 | 2–1 | | 2–1 | 1–1 | 2–0 | 1–0 | 0–0 | 0–1 | 0–3 | 3–3 | 3–2 |
| Falkirk | 0–0 | 3–3 | 1–4 | | 2–0 | 0–1 | 1–3 | 0–0 | 0–0 | 1–3 | 1–2 | 1–3 |
| Hamilton Academical | 0–3 | 1–2 | 0–1 | 0–0 | | 2–1 | 2–0 | 0–0 | 2–2 | 0–1 | 0–2 | 1–0 |
| Heart of Midlothian | 0–3 | 2–1 | 0–0 | 0–0 | 0–2 | | 0–0 | 1–0 | 1–0 | 1–2 | 1–2 | 1–0 |
| Hibernian | 2–0 | 0–1 | 1–1 | 2–0 | 5–1 | 1–1 | | 1–0 | 2–0 | 1–4 | 3–0 | 2–1 |
| Kilmarnock | 1–1 | 1–0 | 0–2 | 1–2 | 3–0 | 1–2 | 1–1 | | 0–3 | 0–0 | 2–1 | 1–2 |
| Motherwell | 1–1 | 2–3 | 2–2 | 1–0 | 1–0 | 1–0 | 1–3 | 3–1 | | 0–0 | 1–3 | 2–0 |
| Rangers | 0–0 | 2–1 | 7–1 | 4–1 | 4–1 | 1–1 | 1–1 | 3–0 | 6–1 | | 3–0 | 2–1 |
| St Johnstone | 1–0 | 1–4 | 2–3 | 3–1 | 1–1 | 2–2 | 5–1 | 0–1 | 2–2 | 1–2 | | 1–0 |
| St Mirren | 1–0 | 0–2 | 0–0 | 1–1 | 0–2 | 2–1 | 1–1 | 1–0 | 3–3 | 0–2 | 1–1 | |

Source: BBC Sport
Legend: Blue = home team win; Yellow = draw; Red = away team win.

=== Matches 23–33 ===
During matches 23–33 each team played every other team once (either at home or away).

| Home \ Away | ABE | CEL | DUN | FAL | HAM | HOM | HIB | KIL | MOT | RAN | STJ | STM |
|---|---|---|---|---|---|---|---|---|---|---|---|---|
| Aberdeen | | 4–4 | 2–2 | | | 0–1 | | | 0–3 | | 1–3 | 2–1 |
| Celtic | | | 1–0 | | | 2–0 | | 3–1 | 2–1 | | 3–0 | |
| Dundee United | | | | 3–0 | 0–2 | 1–0 | | | 3–0 | 0–0 | | |
| Falkirk | 3–1 | 0–2 | | | | | 1–3 | 0–1 | | | | 2–1 |
| Hamilton Academical | 1–1 | 0–1 | | 2–2 | | | 4–1 | | 0–0 | | 1–0 | |
| Heart of Midlothian | | | | 3–2 | 2–0 | | 2–1 | 1–0 | | 1–4 | | |
| Hibernian | 2–2 | 0–1 | 2–4 | | | | | 1–0 | | | 1–1 | 2–1 |
| Kilmarnock | 2–0 | | 4–4 | | 1–2 | | | | | 0–2 | 3–2 | 1–1 |
| Motherwell | | | | 0–1 | | 3–1 | 1–0 | 1–0 | | 1–1 | | |
| Rangers | 3–1 | 1–0 | | 3–0 | 1–0 | | 3–0 | | | | | 3–1 |
| St Johnstone | | | 0–1 | 1–1 | | 1–0 | | | 1–2 | 4–1 | | |
| St Mirren | | 4–0 | 1–2 | | 0–0 | 1–1 | | | 0–0 | | 1–1 | |

Source: BBC Sport
Legend: Blue = home team win; Yellow = draw; Red = away team win.

=== Matches 34–38 ===
After 33 matches, the table splits into two groups of six. Each team plays every team in their own half once (either at home or away)

==== Top six ====
| Home \ Away | CEL | DUN | HOM | HIB | MOT | RAN |
|---|---|---|---|---|---|---|
| Celtic | | | | 3–2 | 4–0 | 2–1 |
| Dundee United | 0–2 | | | 0–2 | | 1–2 |
| Heart of Midlothian | 1–2 | 0–0 | | | 0–2 | |
| Hibernian | | | 1–2 | | | 0–1 |
| Motherwell | | 2–3 | | 6–6 | | |
| Rangers | | | 2–0 | | 3–3 | |

Source: BBC Sport
Legend: Blue = home team win; Yellow = draw; Red = away team win.

==== Bottom six ====
| Home \ Away | ABE | FAL | HAM | KIL | STJ | STM |
|---|---|---|---|---|---|---|
| Aberdeen | | 1–0 | 1–3 | 1–2 | | |
| Falkirk | | | 0–1 | | 0–0 | 1–1 |
| Hamilton Academical | | | | 3–0 | | 0–0 |
| Kilmarnock | | 0–0 | | | 1–2 | |
| St Johnstone | 1–1 | | 2–3 | | | 2–2 |
| St Mirren | 0–1 | | | 1–0 | | |

Source: BBC Sport
Legend: Blue = home team win; Yellow = draw; Red = away team win.

== Attendances ==
As of 14:51, 9 May 2010 (UTC)
Source: SPL

| Team | Stadium | Capacity | Highest | Lowest | Average |
|---|---|---|---|---|---|
| Aberdeen | Pittodrie Stadium | 22,199 | 16,803 | 6,097 | 10,461 |
| Celtic | Celtic Park | 60,355 | 58,500 | 24,000 | 45,582 |
| Dundee United | Tannadice Park | 14,209 | 11,100 | 5,598 | 7,821 |
| Falkirk | Falkirk Stadium | 9,706 | 7,049 | 4,321 | 5,635 |
| Hamilton Academical | New Douglas Park | 6,096 | 5,343 | 2,003 | 3,005 |
| Heart of Midlothian | Tynecastle Stadium | 17,420 | 17,126 | 12,325 | 14,484 |
| Hibernian | Easter Road | 17,500 | 16,949 | 9,185 | 12,164 |
| Kilmarnock | Rugby Park | 18,128 | 10,662 | 4,068 | 5,919 |
| Motherwell | Fir Park | 13,742 | 9,355 | 3,544 | 5,307 |
| Rangers | Ibrox Stadium | 51,082 | 50,321 | 44,291 | 47,564 |
| St Johnstone | McDiarmid Park | 10,673 | 7,807 | 2,993 | 4,717 |
| St Mirren | St Mirren Park | 8,016 | 6,164 | 3,009 | 4,414 |

== Goals ==
=== Top scorers ===
As of 12:14, 10 May 2010 (UTC)
Sources: SPL BBC Archived 6 January 2009 at the Wayback Machine

| Rank | Scorer | Team | Goals |
|---|---|---|---|
| 1 | (Scotland) Kris Boyd | Rangers | 23 |
| 2 | (Republic of Ireland) Anthony Stokes | Hibernian | 21 |
| 3 | (Scotland) Kenny Miller | Rangers | 18 |
| 4 | (Republic of Ireland) Jon Daly | Dundee United | 13 |
| 4 | (Scotland) Derek Riordan | Hibernian | 13 |
| 6 | (England) Lukas Jutkiewicz | Motherwell | 12 |
| 6 | (Republic of Ireland) Robbie Keane | Celtic | 12 |
| 8 | (England) John Sutton | Motherwell | 11 |
| 9 | (France) Marc-Antoine Fortuné | Celtic | 10 |
| 9 | (Australia) Scott McDonald | Celtic | 10 |
| 9 | (Greece) Georgios Samaras | Celtic | 10 |

=== Hat-tricks ===
| Scorer | For | Against | Date |
|---|---|---|---|
| (Scotland) Peter MacDonald | St Johnstone | Motherwell | 26 December 2009 |
| (Scotland) Kris Boyd ^{5} | Rangers | Dundee United | 30 December 2009 |
| (Republic of Ireland) Jon Daly | Dundee United | Falkirk | 23 January 2010 |
| (Scotland) Colin Nish | Hibernian | Motherwell | 5 May 2010 |

^{5} player scored 5 goals

== Awards ==
=== Monthly awards ===
| Month | Manager of the Month | | Player of the Month | | Young Player of the Month | |
| Month | Manager | Club | Player | Club | Player | Club |
|---|---|---|---|---|---|---|
| August | (England) Tony Mowbray | Celtic | (England) Danny Cadamarteri | Dundee United | (Scotland) Ross Forbes | Motherwell |
| September | (Scotland) John Hughes | Hibernian | (Scotland) Derek Riordan | Hibernian | (Scotland) Craig Thomson | Heart of Midlothian |
| October | (Republic of Ireland) Jim Gannon | Motherwell | (Republic of Ireland) Liam Miller | Hibernian | (England) Lukas Jutkiewicz | Motherwell |
| November | (Scotland) Craig Levein | Dundee United | (Scotland) Andy Webster | Dundee United | (Scotland) Peter Pawlett | Aberdeen |
| December | (Scotland) Walter Smith | Rangers | (Scotland) Kris Boyd | Rangers | (Republic of Ireland) Anthony Stokes | Hibernian |
| January | (Scotland) Craig Brown | Motherwell | (Northern Ireland) Steven Davis | Rangers | (Scotland) Fraser Fyvie | Aberdeen |
| February | (Scotland) Craig Brown | Motherwell | (Scotland) David Weir | Rangers | (Scotland) Chris Maguire | Kilmarnock |
| March | (Scotland) Peter Houston | Dundee United | (Republic of Ireland) Robbie Keane | Celtic | (Scotland) Ryan Flynn | Falkirk |
| April | (Scotland) Billy Reid | Hamilton Academical | (Scotland) Kenny Miller | Rangers | (Republic of Ireland) Graham Carey | St Mirren |

=== Clydesdale Bank Premier League Awards ===
| Award | Recipient |
|---|---|
| Player of the Season | (Scotland) David Weir |
| Manager of the Season | (Scotland) Walter Smith |
| Young Player of the Season | (Scotland) David Goodwillie |
| Goal of the Season | (Republic of Ireland) Anthony Stokes |
| Save of the Season | (Poland) Artur Boruc |
| Under-19 League Player of the Season | (Scotland) Dale Hilson |
| Best Club Media Relations | Motherwell |
| SPL Family Champions | St Mirren |
| Best Community Initiative | Hibernian |

PFA Scotland Team of the Year
| Goalkeeper | (Scotland) Allan McGregor (Rangers) | | | |
| Defenders | (Scotland) Steven Whittaker (Rangers) | (Scotland) David Weir (Rangers) | (Scotland) Andy Webster (Dundee United) | (Bosnia and Herzegovina) Saša Papac (Rangers) |
| Midfielders | (Scotland) Jim O'Brien (Motherwell) | (Northern Ireland) Steven Davis (Rangers) | (Republic of Ireland) Liam Miller (Hibernian) | (Scotland) Lee McCulloch (Rangers) |
| Forwards | (Scotland) Kenny Miller (Rangers) | | (Scotland) Kris Boyd (Rangers) | |
