= List of Scottish Premier League hat-tricks =

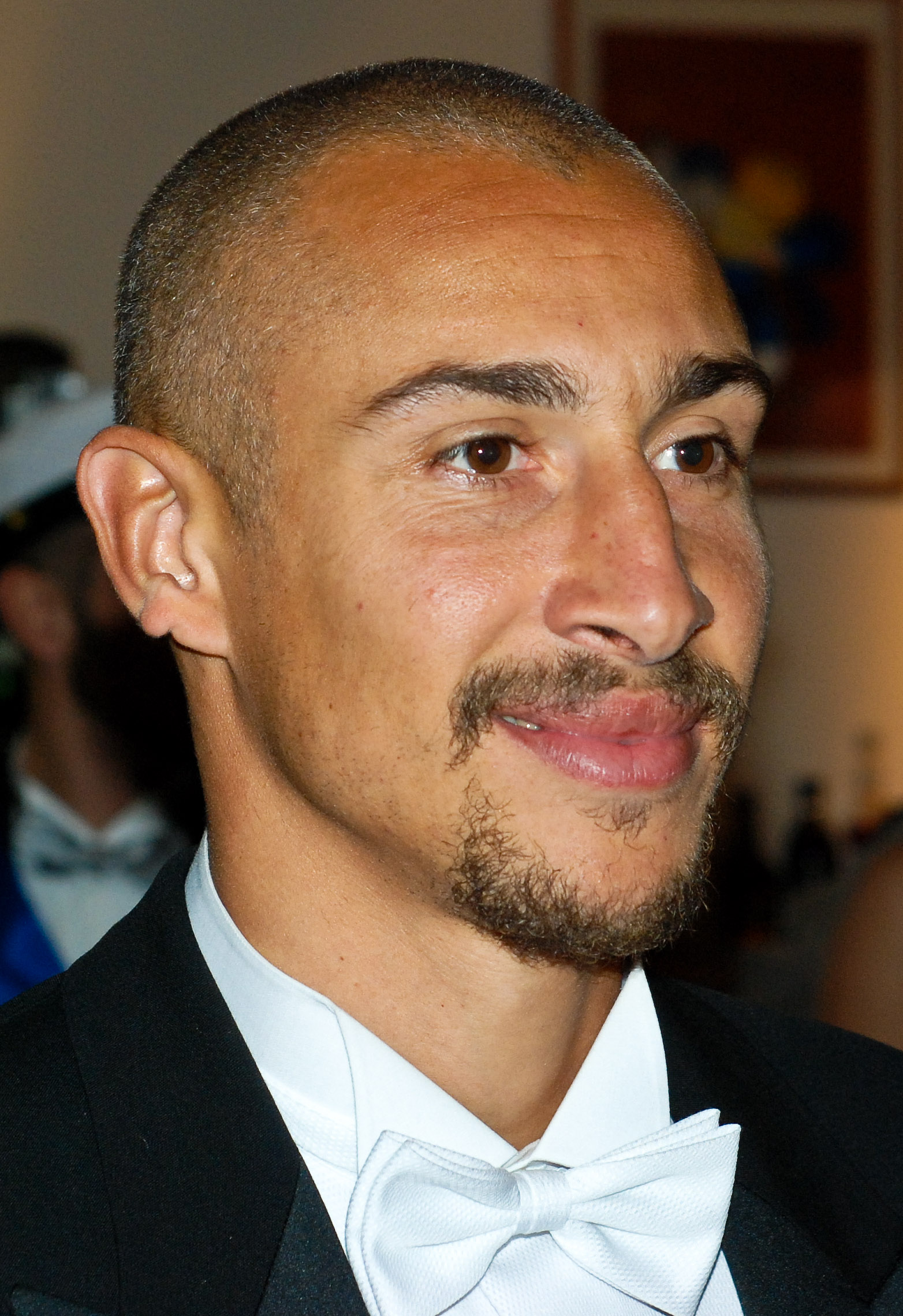
Henrik Larsson scored a record 12 Scottish Premier League hat-tricks, for Celtic.

The Scottish Premier League (SPL) was a football league competition that operated between 1998 and 2013.^{[a]} During that period, more than 100 players scored three goals (a hat-trick) or more in a single match. The first player to achieve the feat was Craig Burley, who scored three times for Celtic in a 5–0 victory against Dunfermline Athletic on the opening day of the first SPL season. Eight players scored more than three goals in a match; of these, three players, Kris Boyd (twice), Gary Hooper and Kenny Miller scored five.

Three matches featured two hat-tricks in the same game. The first two came in the same week of the 1999–2000 season. Henrik Larsson and Mark Viduka both scored three goals each in Celtic's 7–0 win against Aberdeen on 16 October 1999, then Aberdeen's Robbie Winters and Motherwell's John Spencer both scored hat-tricks in a 6–5 win for Aberdeen at Fir Park four days later. Gary Hooper and Anthony Stokes both scored hat-tricks in Celtic's league record 9–0 win against Aberdeen on 6 November 2010. Larsson and Stokes are the only players who have scored hat-tricks in consecutive matches.

Henrik Larsson scored three or more goals twelve times in the Scottish Premier League, more than any other player. Larsson, Boyd, John Hartson, Michael Higdon and Stokes were the only players to have scored more than three hat-tricks in the SPL. Six players scored hat-tricks for two different clubs: Boyd (Kilmarnock and Rangers), Higdon (St Mirren and Motherwell), Gary McSwegan (Heart of Midlothian and Kilmarnock), Colin Nish (Kilmarnock and Hibernian), Stokes (Falkirk and Celtic) and Kyle Lafferty (Rangers and Kilmarnock)

== Hat-tricks ==
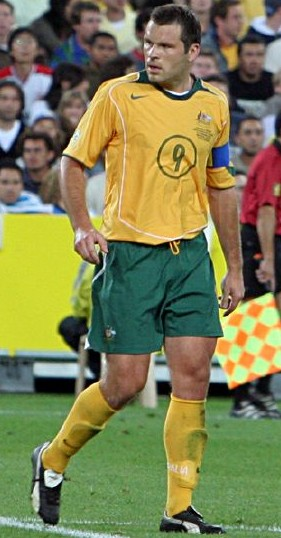
Mark Viduka scored a hat-trick for Celtic against Kilmarnock on 30 October 1999. All three goals were scored in the space of four minutes, making it one of the fastest hat-tricks on record.

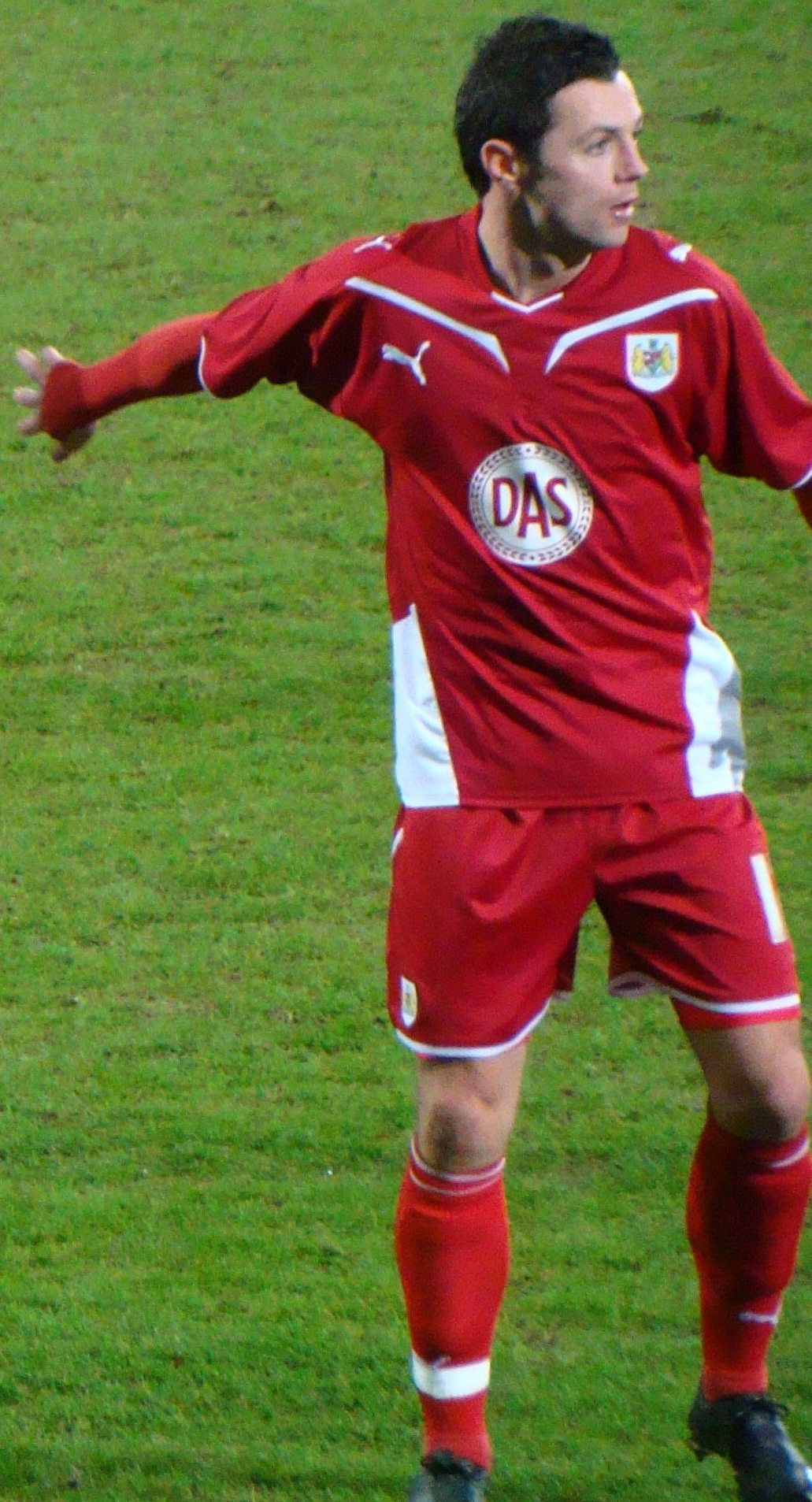
Ivan Sproule scored all three goals in a 3–0 victory for Hibernian against Rangers on 27 August 2005. He had only came onto the pitch as a substitute during the second half of the match.

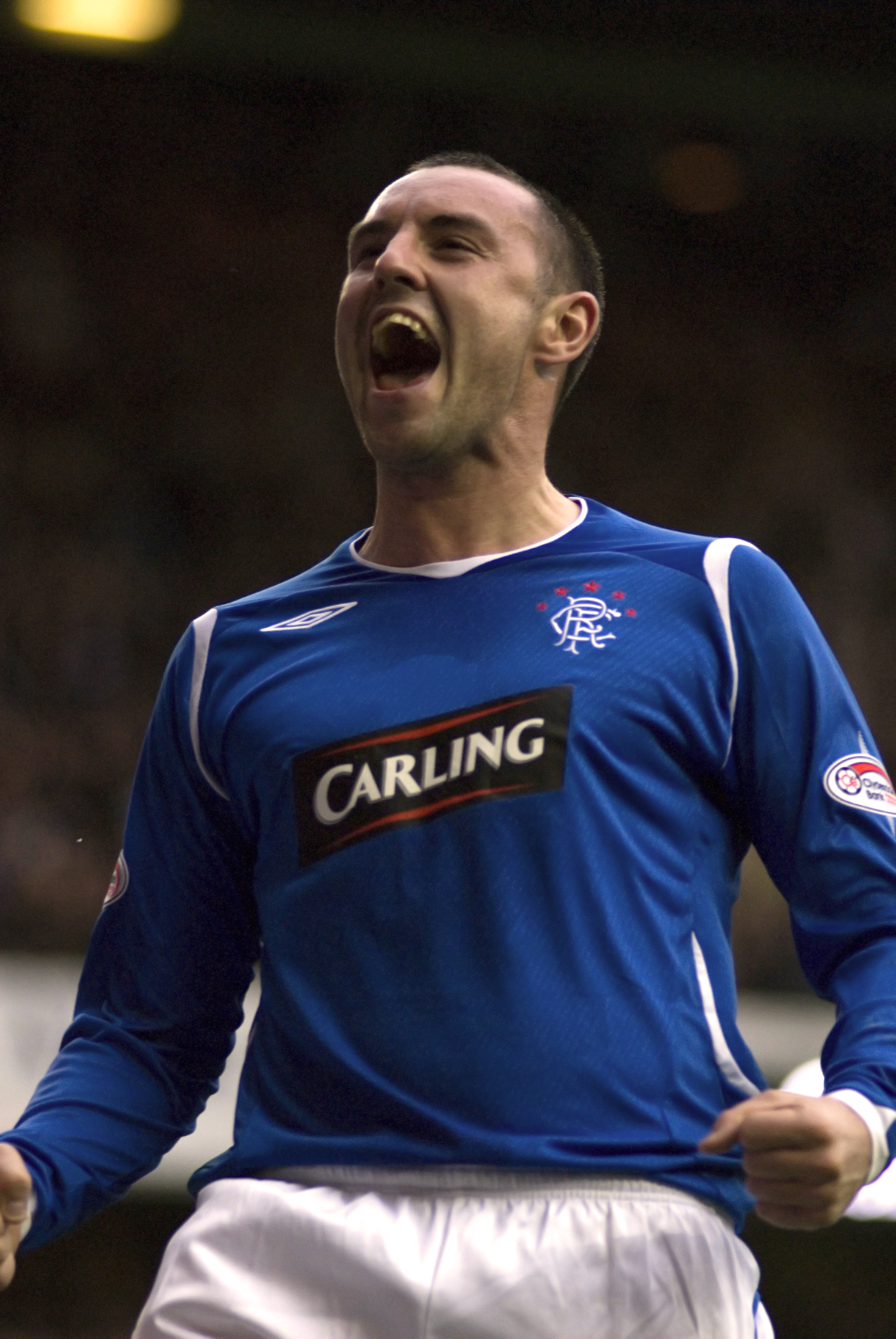
Kris Boyd broke the SPL goalscoring record set by Henrik Larsson when he scored five goals for Rangers against Dundee United on 30 December 2009.

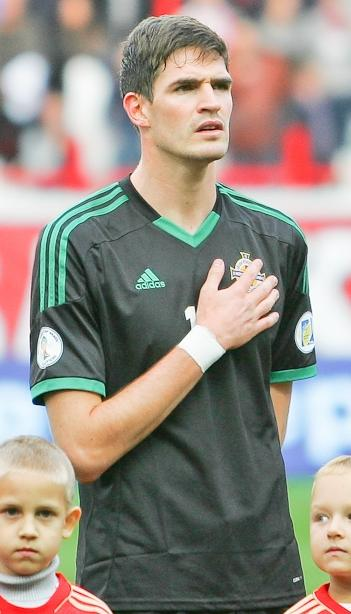
Kyle Lafferty scored a hat-trick as Rangers clinched the championship on the final day of the 2010–11 Scottish Premier League season.

Key
^{4}	Player scored four goals
^{5}	Player scored five goals
*	The home team

#	Player	Nationality	For	Against	Result^{[b]}	Date	Ref
1	Craig Burley	Scotland	Celtic*	Dunfermline Athletic	5–0	1 August 1998	
2	Ally McCoist	Scotland	Kilmarnock*	Heart of Midlothian	3–0	30 August 1998	
3	Billy Dodds	Scotland	Dundee United	St Johnstone*	1–3	26 September 1998	
4	Henrik Larsson	Sweden	Celtic*	Dundee	6–1	7 November 1998	
5	Harald Brattbakk	Norway	Celtic*	St Johnstone	5–0	31 January 1999	
6	Henrik Larsson	Sweden	Celtic*	Heart of Midlothian	3–0	6 February 1999	
7	Jorg Albertz	Germany	Rangers*	Dundee	6–1	20 February 1999	
8	Henrik Larsson^{4}	Sweden	Celtic	Motherwell*	1–7	21 February 1999	
9	Rod Wallace	England	Rangers	Kilmarnock*	0–5	28 February 1999	
10	Robbie Winters	Scotland	Aberdeen*	Dunfermline Athletic	3–1	3 April 1999	
11	Gary McSwegan	Scotland	Heart of Midlothian	Aberdeen*	2–5	23 May 1999	
12	Michael Mols^{4}	Netherlands	Rangers*	Motherwell	4–1	15 August 1999	
13	Gary McSwegan	Scotland	Heart of Midlothian*	Aberdeen	3–0	22 August 1999	
14	Henrik Larsson	Sweden	Celtic*	Aberdeen	7–0	16 October 1999	
15	Mark Viduka	Australia	Celtic*	Aberdeen	7–0	16 October 1999	
16	Robbie Winters	Scotland	Aberdeen	Motherwell*	5–6	20 October 1999	
17	John Spencer	Scotland	Motherwell*	Aberdeen	5–6	20 October 1999	
18	Jonatan Johansson	Finland	Rangers	Aberdeen*	1–5	30 October 1999	
19	Mark Viduka	Australia	Celtic*	Kilmarnock	5–1	30 October 1999	
20	Rod Wallace	England	Rangers	Dundee*	1–7	27 February 2000	
21	Tommy Johnson	England	Celtic*	Dundee	6–2	1 March 2000	
22	Rod Wallace	England	Rangers*	Motherwell	6–2	18 March 2000	
23	Tommy Johnson	England	Celtic*	Aberdeen	5–1	6 May 2000	
24	Juan Sara	Argentina	Dundee	Dundee United	3–0	20 September 2000	
25	Robbie Winters	Scotland	Aberdeen	Dundee United*	3–5	23 September 2000	
26	Mixu Paatelainen	Finland	Hibernian*	Heart of Midlothian	6–2	22 October 2000	
27	Kenny Miller^{5}	Scotland	Rangers*	St Mirren	7–1	4 November 2000	
28	Henrik Larsson	Sweden	Celtic*	Aberdeen	6–0	17 December 2000	
29	Paul Wright	Scotland	Kilmarnock	St Mirren*	1–3	26 December 2000	
30	Henrik Larsson^{4}	Sweden	Celtic*	Kilmarnock	6–0	2 January 2001	
31	Henrik Larsson	Sweden	Celtic	Heart of Midlothian*	0–3	4 February 2001	
32	Arild Stavrum	Norway	Aberdeen*	St Mirren	3–0	21 February 2001	
33	Arild Stavrum	Norway	Aberdeen*	Dundee United	4–1	4 April 2001	
34	Tore André Flo	Norway	Rangers	Dundee United*	1–6	22 September 2001	
35	Hicham Zerouali	Morocco	Aberdeen	Dundee*	1–4	29 September 2001	
36	John Hartson	Wales	Celtic*	Dundee United	5–1	20 October 2001	
37	David Ferrere	France	Motherwell*	Hibernian	4–0	9 February 2002	
38	Henrik Larsson	Sweden	Celtic*	Dunfermline Athletic	5–0	9 February 2002	
39	Henrik Larsson	Sweden	Celtic*	Livingston	5–1	6 April 2002	
40	Mark de Vries^{4}	Suriname	Heart of Midlothian*	Hibernian	5–1	11 August 2002	
41	Claudio Caniggia	Argentina	Rangers*	Dunfermline Athletic*	0–6	1 September 2002	
42	Henrik Larsson	Sweden	Celtic*	Kilmarnock	5–0	28 September 2002	
43	John Hartson^{4}	Wales	Celtic*	Aberdeen	7–0	3 November 2002	
44	Alex Burns	Scotland	Partick Thistle*	Kilmarnock	3–0	30 November 2002	
45	Shota Arveladze	Georgia	Rangers*	Livingston	4–3	4 December 2002	
46	Barry Ferguson	Scotland	Rangers*	Dundee United	3–1	14 December 2002	
47	John Hartson	Wales	Celtic*	Heart of Midlothian	4–2	26 December 2002	
48	Gary McSwegan^{4}	Scotland	Kilmarnock*	Hibernian	6–2	5 April 2003	
49	James McFadden	Scotland	Motherwell*	Livingston	6–2	24 May 2003	
50	Henrik Larsson	Sweden	Celtic*	Livingston	5–1	30 August 2003	
51	Henrik Larsson	Sweden	Celtic*	Aberdeen	4–0	25 October 2003	
52	Chris Sutton	England	Celtic	Kilmarnock*	0–5	1 November 2003	
53	Chris Sutton	England	Celtic	Dundee United*	1–5	22 November 2003	
54	David Clarkson	Scotland	Motherwell*	Dundee United	3–1	3 January 2004	
55	Jim McIntyre	Scotland	Dundee United*	Kilmarnock	4–1	20 March 2004	
56	Kris Boyd^{5}	Scotland	Kilmarnock*	Dundee United	5–2	25 September 2004	
57	Andy Tod	Scotland	Dunfermline Athletic*	Dundee	3–1	1 January 2005	
58	Derek Riordan	Scotland	Hibernian*	Kilmarnock	3–0	22 January 2005	
59	Craig Bellamy	Wales	Celtic	Dundee United*	2–3	19 March 2005	
60	John Hartson	Wales	Celtic	Livingston*	0–4	13 April 2005	
61	Derek Young	Scotland	Dunfermline Athletic*	Dundee	5–0	7 May 2005	
62	John Hartson	Wales	Celtic	Motherwell*	4–4	30 July 2005	
63	Colin Nish	Scotland	Kilmarnock*	Livingston	3–0	27 August 2005	
64	Ivan Sproule	Northern Ireland	Hibernian	Rangers*	0–3	27 August 2005	
65	Stiliyan Petrov	Bulgaria	Celtic*	Motherwell	5–0	26 October 2005	
66	Peter Løvenkrands	Denmark	Rangers	Kilmarnock*	2–3	11 December 2005	
67	Maciej Żurawski^{4}	Poland	Celtic	Dunfermline Athletic*	1–8	19 February 2006	
68	Kris Boyd	Scotland	Rangers	Dundee United*	1–4	2 April 2006	
69	Shunsuke Nakamura	Japan	Celtic	Dundee United*	1–4	14 October 2006	
70	Anthony Stokes	Ireland	Falkirk*	Dundee United	5–1	28 October 2006	
71	Anthony Stokes	Ireland	Falkirk	Dunfermline Athletic*	0–3	4 November 2006	
72	Thomas Gravesen	Denmark	Celtic	St Mirren*	1–3	12 November 2006	
73	Anthony Stokes	Ireland	Falkirk*	Inverness CT	3–1	30 December 2006	
74	Alan Gow	Scotland	Falkirk	Dundee United*	1–5	1 January 2007	
75	Jan Vennegoor of Hesselink	Netherlands	Celtic*	St Mirren	5–1	20 January 2007	
76	Kris Boyd	Scotland	Rangers	Kilmarnock*	1–3	11 February 2007	
77	Kris Boyd	Scotland	Rangers*	Aberdeen	3–0	17 March 2007	
78	Barry Robson	Scotland	Dundee United	Heart of Midlothian*	0–4	17 March 2007	
79	Scott McDonald	Australia	Celtic*	Dundee United	3–0	29 September 2007	
80	Clayton Donaldson	England	Hibernian*	Kilmarnock	4–1	29 September 2007	
81	Scott McDonald	Australia	Celtic*	Motherwell	3–0	27 October 2007	
82	Aiden McGeady	Ireland	Celtic*	Falkirk	4–0	11 December 2007	
83	Barry Robson	Scotland	Dundee United*	Heart of Midlothian	4–1	2 January 2008	
84	Steven Fletcher	Scotland	Hibernian*	Gretna	4–2	13 February 2008	
85	Kris Boyd	Scotland	Rangers*	Inverness CT	5–0	1 November 2008	
86	Kris Boyd	Scotland	Rangers*	Hamilton Academical	7–1	6 December 2008	
87	Chris Porter	England	Motherwell*	Inverness CT	3–2	27 December 2008	
88	Shunsuke Nakamura	Japan	Celtic*	St Mirren	7–0	28 February 2009	
89	Kevin Kyle	Scotland	Kilmarnock*	Falkirk	3–0	11 April 2009	
90	Peter MacDonald	Scotland	St Johnstone	Motherwell*	1–3	26 December 2009	
91	Kris Boyd^{5}	Scotland	Rangers*	Dundee United	7–1	30 December 2009	
92	Jon Daly	Ireland	Dundee United	Falkirk*	1–4	24 January 2010	
93	Colin Nish	Scotland	Hibernian	Motherwell*	6–6	5 May 2010	
94	Paul Hartley	Scotland	Aberdeen*	Hamilton Academical	4–0	14 August 2010	
95	Kenny Miller	Scotland	Rangers	Hibernian*	0–3	22 August 2010	
96	Rudi Skacel	Czech Republic	Heart of Midlothian*	St Mirren	3–0	23 October 2010	
97	Gary Hooper	England	Celtic*	Aberdeen	9–0	6 November 2010	
98	Anthony Stokes	Ireland	Celtic*	Aberdeen	9–0	6 November 2010	
99	Nick Blackman	England	Motherwell*	St Johnstone	4–0	10 November 2010	
100	Kenny Miller	Scotland	Rangers	Kilmarnock*	2–3	20 November 2010	
101	Adam Rooney	Ireland	Inverness CT*	Hibernian	4–2	20 November 2010	
102	Nikica Jelavić	Croatia	Rangers*	Motherwell	6–0	12 February 2011	
103	Michael Higdon	England	St Mirren*	Hamilton Academical	3–1	2 April 2011	
104	Jon Daly	Ireland	Dundee United*	Motherwell	4–0	7 May 2011	
105	Kyle Lafferty	Northern Ireland	Rangers	Kilmarnock*	1–5	15 May 2011	
106	Scott Vernon	England	Aberdeen*	Dunfermline Athletic	4–0	30 September 2011	
107	Andrew Shinnie	Scotland	Inverness CT	Kilmarnock*	3–6	5 November 2011	
108	Gary Hooper	England	Celtic*	St Mirren	5–0	26 November 2011	
109	Rudi Skacel	Czech Republic	Heart of Midlothian*	St Mirren	5–2	14 January 2012	
110	Michael Higdon	England	Motherwell*	Hibernian	4–3	22 February 2012	
111	Steven Thompson	Scotland	St Mirren*	Dunfermline Athletic	4–4	21 April 2012	
112	Gary Hooper^{5}	England	Celtic*	Heart of Midlothian	5–0	13 May 2012	
113	Sone Aluko	Nigeria	Rangers	St Johnstone*	0–4	13 May 2012	
114	Michael Higdon	England	Motherwell*	Inverness CT	4–1	2 September 2012	
115	Cillian Sheridan	Ireland	Kilmarnock	Heart of Midlothian*	1–3	29 September 2012	
116	Billy McKay	Northern Ireland	Inverness CT	Dundee United*	4–4	15 December 2012	
117	Niall McGinn	Northern Ireland	Aberdeen	Dundee*	1–3	29 December 2012	
118	Johnny Russell	Scotland	Dundee United	Kilmarnock*	2–3	19 January 2013	
119	Michael Higdon	England	Motherwell*	St Johnstone	3–2	20 January 2013	
120	Paul Heffernan	Ireland	Kilmarnock	Heart of Midlothian*	0–3	16 February 2013	
121	Billy McKay	Northern Ireland	Inverness CT*	Motherwell	4–3	4 May 2013	

== Multiple hat-tricks ==
Rank	Player	Hat-tricks
1st	(Sweden) Henrik Larsson	12
2nd	(Scotland) Kris Boyd	7
3rd	(Wales) John Hartson	5
4th	(England) Michael Higdon	4
4th	(Republic of Ireland) Anthony Stokes	4
6th	(England) Gary Hooper	3
6th	(Scotland) Gary McSwegan	3
6th	(Scotland) Kenny Miller	3
6th	(England) Rod Wallace	3
6th	(Scotland) Robbie Winters	3
9th	(Republic of Ireland) Jon Daly	2
9th	(England) Tommy Johnson	2
9th	(Australia) Scott McDonald	2
9th	(Northern Ireland) Billy McKay	2
9th	(Japan) Shunsuke Nakamura	2
9th	(Scotland) Colin Nish	2
9th	(Scotland) Barry Robson	2
9th	(Czech Republic) Rudi Skacel	2
9th	(Norway) Arild Stavrum	2
9th	(England) Chris Sutton	2
9th	(Australia) Mark Viduka	2

== Notes ==
^{a} The Scottish Premier League was the top tier of the Scottish football league system. It was formed in 1998 and was disestablished in 2013.

^{b} The results column shows the home team score first.
