= 1992–93 Dundee F.C. season =

Dundee
1992–93 season
- Manager: Simon Stainrod
- Stadium: Dens Park
- Premier Division: 10th
- Scottish Cup: 4th round
- League Cup: 4th round
- Top goalscorer: League: Billy Dodds (16); All: Billy Dodds (18)
Home colours

The 1992–93 season was the 91st season in which Dundee competed at a Scottish national level, playing in the Scottish Premier Division after winning the First Division the previous season. Dundee would finish 10th, 5 points clear of relegation. Dundee would also compete in both the Scottish League Cup and the Scottish Cup, where they were knocked out by Celtic in the 4th round of the League Cup, and by Heart of Midlothian in the 4th round of the Scottish Cup.

== Scottish Premier Division ==
Statistics provided by Dee Archive.

Match day	Date	Opponent	H/A	Score	Dundee scorer(s)	Attendance
1	1 August	Falkirk	H	1–2	Rix	5,960
2	4 August	St Johnstone	H	1–1	Dinnie	5,663
3	8 August	Airdrieonians	A	0–0		2,500
4	15 August	Rangers	H	4–3	den Bieman, Gilzean, Dodds (2) (pen.)	12,807
5	22 August	Aberdeen	A	1–2	Paterson	11,604
6	29 August	Partick Thistle	A	3–6	Dodds (2), Gilzean	5,429
7	1 September	Heart of Midlothian	H	1–3	Dodds	5,878
8	12 September	Motherwell	H	2–1	Dodds, Vrťo	3,797
9	19 September	Dundee United	A	1–0	Dodds (pen.)	12,622
10	26 September	Hibernian	A	0–0		7,290
11	3 October	Celtic	H	0–1		15,883
12	10 October	Falkirk	A	2–2	den Bieman, Dodds	4,818
13	17 October	Airdrieonians	H	2–0	McKeown, Dodds	4,092
14	24 October	Partick Thistle	H	0–2		5,633
15	31 October	Heart of Midlothian	A	0–1		7,452
16	7 November	Aberdeen	H	1–2	Dodds	7,527
17	11 November	Rangers	A	1–3	den Bieman	33,497
18	21 November	Dundee United	H	1–3	Dodds	12,018
19	28 November	Motherwell	A	3–1	Gilzean (2), Stainrod	3,534
20	2 December	St Johnstone	A	4–4	Pittman, Wieghorst, Dodds (2)	5,766
21	5 December	Hibernian	H	1–1	Stainrod	5,656
22	12 December	Celtic	A	0–1		16,797
23	19 December	Falkirk	H	2–1	Dodds, Stainrod	6,190
24	26 December	Rangers	H	1–3	Stainrod	13,983
25	2 January	Aberdeen	A	0–0		13,201
26	27 January	Partick Thistle	A	0–2		2,797
27	30 January	Airdrieonians	A	2–2	Reid (o.g.), Paterson	2,500
28	3 February	Heart of Midlothian	H	1–0	McGowan	4,335
29	13 February	St Johnstone	H	1–0	Stainrod	5,031
30	20 February	Hibernian	A	3–1	Stainrod, Dow, Kiwomya	5,681
31	23 February	Celtic	H	0–1		7,360
32	27 February	Dundee United	A	0–1		12,140
33	6 March	Motherwell	H	1–1	Rix	3,370
34	10 March	Falkirk	A	0–1		3,452
35	13 March	Airdrieonians	H	1–1	Dodds	3,079
36	20 March	Aberdeen	H	1–2	Stainrod	5,933
37	27 March	Rangers	A	0–3		40,294
38	3 April	Partick Thistle	H	0–1		3,998
39	10 April	Heart of Midlothian	A	0–0		6,033
40	17 April	Motherwell	A	2–1	Ritchie, Dodds	4,287
41	20 April	Dundee United	H	0–4		9,739
42	1 May	St Johnstone	A	1–1	Ritchie	4,471
43	8 May	Hibernian	H	3–1	Wieghorst, Ritchie, Gilzean	5,265
44	15 May	Celtic	A	0–2		19,436

=== League table ===
Pos	Team	Pld	W	D	L	GF	GA	GD	Pts	Qualification or relegation
8	Partick Thistle	44	12	12	20	50	71	−21	36	
9	Motherwell	44	11	13	20	46	62	−16	35	
10	Dundee	44	11	12	21	48	68	−20	34	
11	Falkirk (R)	44	11	7	26	60	86	−26	29	Relegation to the 1993–94 Scottish First Division
12	Airdrieonians (R)	44	6	17	21	35	70	−35	29	Relegation to the 1993–94 Scottish First Division

Source: RSSSF
Rules for classification: 1) points; 2) goal difference; 3) number of goals scored.
(R) Relegated

== Scottish League Cup ==
Statistics provided by Dee Archive.

Match day	Date	Opponent	H/A	Score	Dundee scorer(s)	Attendance
3rd round	11 August	Meadowbank Thistle	A	3–0	Dodds, McGowan, D. Campbell	898
4th round	19 August	Celtic	A	0–1		30,849

== Scottish Cup ==
Statistics provided by Dee Archive.

Match day	Date	Opponent	H/A	Score	Dundee scorer(s)	Attendance
3rd round	10 January	Dumbarton	H	2–0	Wieghorst, Dodds (pen.)	4,290
4th round	6 February	Heart of Midlothian	A	0–2		12,021

== Player statistics ==
Statistics provided by Dee Archive

No.	Pos	Nat	Player	Total		First Division		Scottish Cup		League Cup	
No.	Pos	Nat	Player	Apps	Goals	Apps	Goals	Apps	Goals	Apps	Goals
	MF	(Australia) AUS	Lachie Armstrong	1	0	1	0	0	0	0	0
	DF	(Scotland) SCO	Kevin Bain	26	0	24	0	2	0	0	0
	MF	(Scotland) SCO	Stuart Beedie	16	0	8+6	0	0	0	2	0
	FW	(Scotland) SCO	Duncan Campbell	6	1	2+2	0	1	0	0+1	1
	DF	(Scotland) SCO	Stevie Campbell	20	0	20	0	0	0	0	0
	MF	(Scotland) SCO	Max Christie	2	0	1+1	0	0	0	0	0
	DF	(France) FRA	Lionel David	8	0	8	0	0	0	0	0
	MF	(Netherlands) NED	Ivo den Bieman	28	3	23+1	3	0+2	0	2	0
	DF	(Scotland) SCO	Alan Dinnie	29	1	26	1	1	0	2	0
	FW	(Scotland) SCO	Billy Dodds	45	18	41	16	2	1	2	1
	DF	(Scotland) SCO	Andy Dow	14	1	8+5	1	1	0	0	0
	DF	(Scotland) SCO	Jim Duffy	43	0	39	0	2	0	2	0
	DF	(Scotland) SCO	Stephen Frail	7	0	7	0	0	0	0	0
	FW	(Scotland) SCO	Eddie Gallagher	3	0	2+1	0	0	0	0	0
	FW	(Scotland) SCO	Ian Gilzean	25	5	17+6	5	0	0	2	0
	FW	(England) ENG	Andy Kiwomya	20	1	11+8	1	0+1	0	0	0
	GK	(Scotland) SCO	Jim Leighton	10	0	8	0	0	0	2	0
	GK	(Scotland) SCO	Paul Mathers	38	0	36	0	2	0	0	0
	FW	(Scotland) SCO	Neil McCann	3	0	2+1	0	0	0	0	0
	DF	(England) ENG	Jamie McGowan	25	2	21	1	1+1	0	2	1
	MF	(England) ENG	Gary McKeown	21	1	20	1	0	0	1	0
	MF	(Scotland) SCO	Grant McMartin	2	0	2	0	0	0	0	0
	DF	(Scotland) SCO	John McQuillan	30	0	27+1	0	2	0	0	0
	DF	(Scotland) SCO	Gary Paterson	20	2	11+8	2	1	0	0	0
	DF	(United States) USA	Steve Pittman	22	1	20	1	2	0	0	0
	DF	(Wales) WAL	Kevin Ratcliffe	5	0	4	0	0	0	1	0
	FW	(Scotland) SCO	Paul Ritchie	18	3	17+1	3	0	0	0	0
	MF	(England) ENG	Graham Rix	16	2	12+2	2	0	0	2	0
	FW	(England) ENG	Simon Stainrod	21	7	10+10	7	1	0	0	0
	DF	(Slovakia) SVK	Dušan Vrťo	36	1	32	1	2	0	2	0
	MF	(England) ENG	Colin West	8	0	2+5	0	1	0	0	0
	MF	(Denmark) DEN	Morten Wieghorst	24	3	22+1	2	1	1	0	0

== See also ==
- List of Dundee F.C. seasons
