= Stephen Cosgrove =

Stephen Cosgrove may refer to:

- Stephen Cosgrove (footballer) (born 1980), Scottish footballer
- Stephen Cosgrove (writer) (born 1945), American children's author and toy designer
