= James Cosgrove =

James Cosgrove may refer to:

- James Cosgrove (comedian), English singer and comedian
- James Cosgrove (politician) (1861–1911), South Carolina politician
