= Eddie Forrest =

Scottish footballer (born 1978)

Personal information
- Date of birth: 17 December 1978 (age 47)
- Place of birth: Edinburgh, Scotland

Senior career*
Years	Team	Apps	(Gls)
1996–1999	Stirling Albion	28	(0)
1999–2001	Airdrieonians	48	(2)
2001–2002	Motherwell	13	(0)
2002–2003	Berwick Rangers	11	(0)
2003	Arbroath	10	(1)
2003–2004	Partick Thistle	5	(0)
2004–2006	Forfar Athletic	62	(4)
2006–2008	Ayr United	71	(8)
2008–2010	East Stirlingshire	50	(1)
2010–2011	Airdrie United	9	(1)
Total		304	(17)
- * Club domestic league appearances and goals

Edward Forrest (born 17 December 1978) is a Scottish former footballer.

== Career ==
Forrest began his career with Stirling Albion, spending three years with The Binos before moving to Airdrieonians in 1999. In June 2000, Forrest was one of just three players to survive the club's financial troubles, with the majority of players released from their contracts. Subsequently, made redundant the following year, Forrest joined Scottish Premier League side Motherwell, only to suffer the same fate in April 2002. Forrest joined Berwick Rangers and had spells with Arbroath, a brief return to the SPL with Partick Thistle, Forfar Athletic and Ayr United before joining East Stirlingshire. He retired from the game after two years with The Shire, but came out of retirement in November 2010 to return to Airdrie, to play for Airdrieonians' successors Airdrie United.

=== Hoax victim ===
In July 2003, Paul Browne returned to Arbroath, after Forrest left on the promise of full-time football at Raith Rovers. Arbroath manager John Brownlie signed Browne as a replacement for Forrest, then discovered that Forrest had been duped. A telephone call that Forrest had believed to be from Danny Smith, the Raith chairman, had been a hoax. The caller had been Browne, Forrest's prospective replacement, although Browne argued it was "a friend". Forrest was reinstated at Arbroath and Browne summarily sacked, fleeing Scotland, although Forrest subsequently join Partick Thistle, which led Brownlie to re-sign Browne to fill the defensive gap. Brownlie had to check with captain Andy Dow that the players would accept Browne after the hoax.

== Honours ==
Airdrieonians

- Scottish Challenge Cup: 2000–01
