= Carysfort College =

Teachers college in Dublin, Ireland

Coordinates: 53.296171°N 6.184644°W

Our Lady of Mercy College, Carysfort
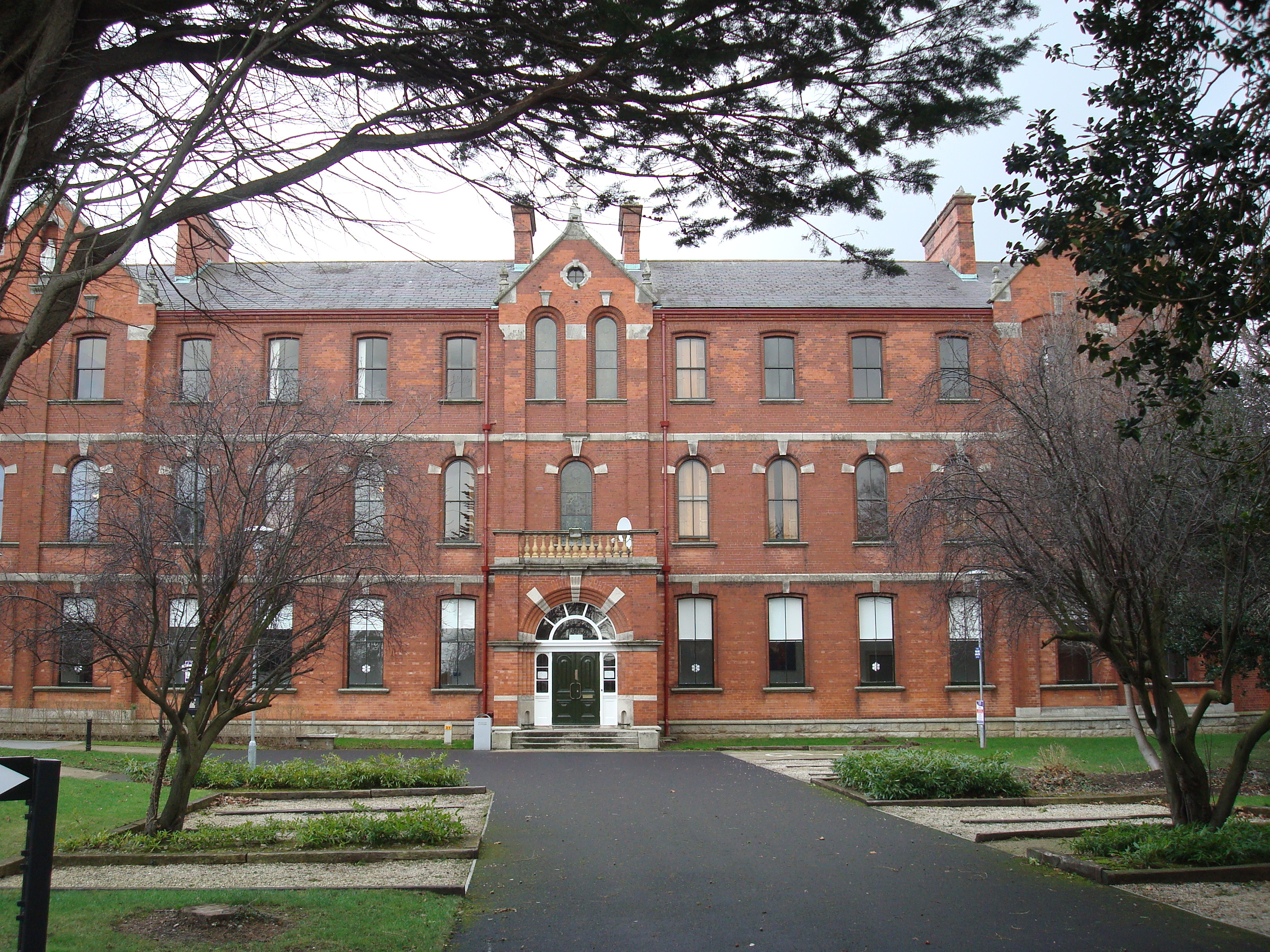
- Other names: Carysfort College
- Type: Teacher training college
- Active: 1877–1988
- Religious affiliation: Sisters of Mercy (1877–1988)
- Academic affiliations: NUI (1975–1988)
- Location: Blackrock, Dublin, Ireland
- Campus: Suburban

Our Lady of Mercy College, Carysfort (commonly known as Carysfort College) was a College of Education in Dublin, Ireland from its foundation in 1877 until its closure in 1988. Educating primary school teachers, and located in a parkland campus in Blackrock, it was a recognised college of the National University of Ireland from April 1975. The site is now the premises of the Michael Smurfit Graduate Business School, part of University College Dublin.

== Situation ==
The college occupied a part of the Carysfort Estate, on Carysfort Avenue, Blackrock, about a kilometre from Blackrock village, and with frontages on multiple streets. The estate comprised around 90 acres (36 ha), with extensive lawns, mature trees and the Carysfort-Maretimo Stream. Aside from the college, the estate accommodated the headquarters of the Sisters of Mercy, a novitiate for the order, a hall of residence, an orphanage, a restaurant, a national school, and several gate lodges, occupied by current or former staff.

== History ==
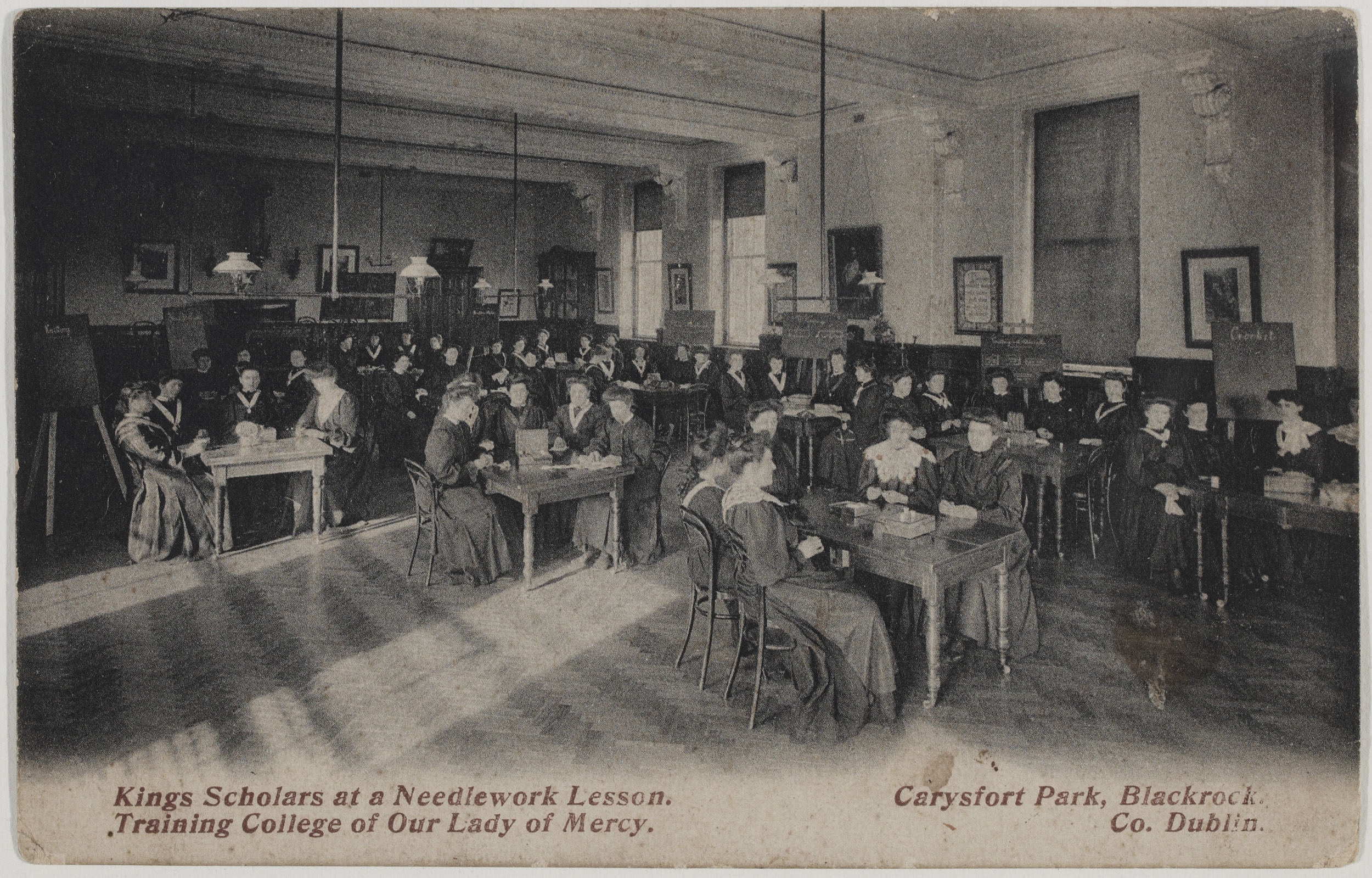
Carysfort Park, Blackrock

Carysfort Training College was set up as a training college for Catholic girls who wished to become teachers. The college was founded and run by the Sisters of Mercy. The college developed further when 'Sedes Sapientiae' (Seat of Wisdom) Training School for girls of Catherine McAuley Baggot Street (becoming a recognised Teacher Training college in 1883) and in 1903 moved to Carysfort in Blackrock. The Diploma in Primary School Education awarded by the college was recognised by the Irish Government's Department of Education for teaching in primary schools. The teacher training course, which had been a 2-year "Diploma in Primary Education" course, was lengthened to three years degree in 1974.

In 1975 reforms in the education system in Ireland saw Carysfort become a recognised college of the National University of Ireland along with other teacher training colleges such as Mary Immaculate College in Limerick and St. Patrick's Training College, Drumcondra. Male students were admitted for the first time in 1975 as well. These reforms saw Carysfort and other institutions award the BEd Degree for their teacher training programmes, in 1977. The college also offered a postgraduate qualification in primary school teaching. In 1982 a new library, a new 700-seat auditorium, a sports centre and an audio-visual centre were officially opened by the then Minister for Education.

In 1984 the government refused to allow Carysfort to provide a joint Masters in Education course with University College Dublin. In the mid-1980s the possibility of establishing a National College of Music and Dramatic Arts on the Carysfort campus was investigated, other proposals were to locate a Regional Technical College on the site.

=== Heads ===
Sr. Regina (Teresita Durkan) was the last President of the college, serving from 1974 until 1988. Other presidents or principals included Sister Mary Liguori (Alice Keenan) who served three times as principal, (1877–82, 1888–94, and 1900–06), she purchased Carysfort Park for the college, and Mother Teresita McCormack, President from the 1936 until 1968.

=== Staff ===
Noted past academics at the college include Seamus Heaney, Eoin MacNeill, Pat Wall and Éamon de Valera (Professor of Mathematics, 1906–1916, The organist and composer Vincent O'Brien served as professor of music from 1908 until his death in 1948. Others include the geographer Sr. Stella Fitzpatrick I.B.V.M, the writer Sophia Hillan, former senator Marie-Louise O'Donnell taught speech and drama and the mathematician John B. Cosgrave lectured in Carysfort,

== Closure ==
In 1986 the Minister for Education Gemma Hussey announced the decision to close the 111-year-old College. She attributed the decision to "falling pupil numbers, a young teaching force, which was giving rise to few retirements, and the need to contain public expenditure and achieve 'a better allocation of resources.'". The final students graduated with their teaching degrees from Carysfort College in 1988. For the last graduation ceremony, in October 1988, Seamus Heaney composed some Valedictory Verses.

Many of the academic staff of the college transferred, on closure, to: St. Patrick's Teacher Training College (Drumcondra), NIHE (Dublin) (now Dublin City University), St Patrick's College, Maynooth (now NUI Maynooth), Trinity College Dublin and University College Dublin.

The state had invested several million pounds in renovations that were completed as recently in 1983. The Sisters of Mercy, the owners, had the greater part of the overall property valued at IR£20 million from the sale of the lands and buildings, and agreed to pay the State IR£1.7 million from sale proceeds.

The most developed 20 acres (8.1 ha) of the estate, including the main buildings, were eventually sold to University College Dublin (UCD) in 1991 for IR£8 million, after much speculation – it was not an unusual thing for the state to get property at a much reduced price at the time. This also led to further controversy as it was claimed that the university college was forced to purchase a property that it neither needed nor wanted – especially as its Belfield campus nearby was more than adequate for future expansion. A large share of the remaining lands was sold for housing, while the national school lands were retained, as were the privately occupied gate lodges.

In November 2018 a commemoration event was held to mark the 30th anniversary of the college's closure. The event was attended by over 500 former students and staff, and facilitated by the Michael Smurfit Graduate School of Business.

== Site today ==
UCD developed the Michael Smurfit School of Business on the site, and it continues to operate there.
