= Andy Dow =

Scottish footballer

Personal information
- Full name: Andrew James Dow
- Date of birth: 7 February 1973 (age 53)
- Place of birth: Dundee, Scotland
- Height: 5 ft 9 in (1.75 m)
- Position: Defender

Youth career
- 1989–1990: Sporting Club 85

Senior career*
Years	Team	Apps	(Gls)
1990–1993	Dundee	18	(1)
1993–1996	Chelsea	16	(0)
1994	→ Bradford City (loan)	5	(0)
1996–1998	Hibernian	62	(3)
1998–2001	Aberdeen	75	(6)
2001–2002	Motherwell	9	(1)
2002–2003	St Mirren	10	(0)
2003–2004	Arbroath	31	(4)
2004	Raith Rovers	9	(0)
Total		235	(15)

International career
1993	Scotland under–21	4	(0)
- * Club domestic league appearances and goals

Andy Dow (born 7 February 1973) is a Scottish former footballer who played for numerous clubs in a defensive role.

Dow started out with Scottish junior side Sporting Club 85, before signing for Dundee in 1990. He moved south to sign for Chelsea for £250,000 in 1993, staying for three years. He had a spell with Bradford City on loan, and then played for a succession of Scottish clubs, including Hibernian, Aberdeen, Motherwell (scoring once against Kilmarnock), St Mirren, Arbroath and Raith Rovers

== Career statistics ==
=== Appearances and goals by club, season and competition ===
Appearances and goals by club, season and competition
Club	Season	League			National Cup		League Cup		Europe		Other		Total	
Club	Season	Division	Apps	Goals	Apps	Goals	Apps	Goals	Apps	Goals	Apps	Goals	Apps	Goals
Dundee	1991–92	Scottish First Division	5	0	0	0	0	0	-	-	-	-	5	0
Dundee	1992–93	Scottish Premier Division	13	1	1	0	0	0	0	0	-	-	14	1
Dundee	Total		18	1	1	0	0	0	0	0	-	-	19	1
Chelsea	1993–94	Premier League	15	0	1	0	2	0	0	0	-	-	18	0
Chelsea	1994–95	Premier League	0	0	0	0	0	0	0	0	-	-	0	0
Chelsea	1995–96	Premier League	1	0	0	0	0	0	0	0	-	-	1	0
Chelsea	Total		16	0	1	0	2	0	0	0	-	-	19	0
Bradford City (loan)	1994–95	Second Division	5	0	-	-	-	-	-	-	-	-	5+	0+
Hibernian	1995–96	Scottish Premier Division	8	1	0	0	0	0	0	0	-	-	8	1
Hibernian	1996–97	Scottish Premier Division	22	2	1	0	3	1	0	0	2	0	28	3
Hibernian	1997–98	Scottish Premier Division	32	0	1	0	2	0	0	0	-	-	35	0
Hibernian	Total		62	3	2	0	5	1	0	0	2	0	71	4
Aberdeen	1998–99	SPL	25	0	1	0	2	0	0	0	-	-	28	0
Aberdeen	1999–00	SPL	35	5	7	1	5	1	0	0	-	-	47	7
Aberdeen	2000–01	SPL	15	1	2	0	0	0	2	0	-	-	19	1
Aberdeen	Total		75	6	10	1	7	1	2	0	-	-	94	8
Motherwell	2001–02	SPL	9	1	1	0	0	0	0	0	-	-	10	1
St Mirren	2002–03	Scottish First Division	10	0	0	0	2	0	-	-	4	0	16	0
Arbroath	2002–03	Scottish First Division	13	2	0	0	0	0	-	-	-	-	13	2
Arbroath	2003–04	Scottish Second Division	18	2	2	0	2	0	-	-	1	0	23	2
Arbroath	Total		31	4	2	0	2	0	-	-	1	0	36	4
Raith Rovers	2003–04	Scottish First Division	9	0	0	0	0	0	-	-	-	-	9	0
Career total			235	15	17+	1+	18+	2+	2	0	7	0	279+	18+

== Honours ==
=== Aberdeen ===
- Scottish League Cup

Runner-up: 1999–2000

- Scottish Cup

Runner-up: 1999–2000
