= Colin Nish =

Scottish footballer & coach

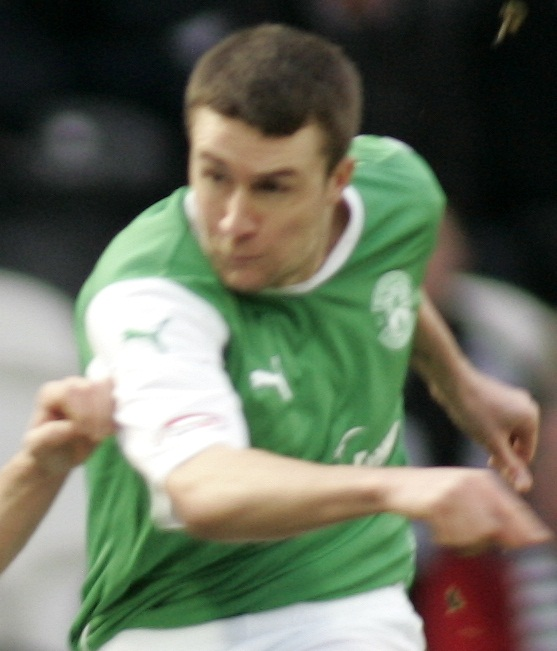
- Nish playing for Hibernian in 2011

Personal information
- Full name: Colin John Nish
- Date of birth: 7 March 1981 (age 45)
- Place of birth: Edinburgh, Scotland
- Height: 6 ft 3 in (1.91 m)
- Position: Striker

Youth career
- 1997–1999: Dunfermline Athletic

Senior career*
Years	Team	Apps	(Gls)
1999–2003	Dunfermline Athletic	22	(0)
2000	→ Alloa Athletic (loan)	13	(5)
2000–2001	→ Alloa Athletic (loan)	10	(3)
2002–2003	→ Clyde (loan)	15	(7)
2003–2008	Kilmarnock	145	(55)
2008–2011	Hibernian	98	(34)
2011–2013	Hartlepool United	19	(8)
2012–2013	→ Dundee (loan)	24	(8)
2015–2016	Portland Timbers	21	(7)
2016–2017	Dumbarton	17	(7)
2017–2018	Cowdenbeath	15	(5)
Total		428	(149)

Managerial career
- 2017–2018: Cowdenbeath
- 2022–2023: Tranent Juniors
- * Club domestic league appearances and goals

Colin John Nish (born 7 March 1981) is a Scottish former football player, coach and manager. Nish played for Dunfermline Athletic, Alloa Athletic, Clyde, Kilmarnock, Hibernian, Hartlepool United, Dundee, Portland Timbers, Dumbarton and Cowdenbeath. Whilst playing for Cowdenbeath, Nish was appointed player-manager of the Fife club. Following their relegation to Scottish League Two, Nish's contract was terminated. He subsequently managed Tranent Juniors for the 2022–23 season.

== Early life ==
Nish grew up in Musselburgh and was a fan of Hibernian.

== Playing career ==
=== Dunfermline Athletic ===
Nish started his career with Dunfermline, where he made his debut in the 1998–99 season. Nish had two subsequent loan spells with Alloa and a loan spell at Clyde.

=== Kilmarnock ===
Nish joined Kilmarnock in 2003 after being released by Dunfermline. Nish initially signed a six-month deal which ran until Christmas 2003, at which point he agreed a new 18-month contract.

=== Hibernian ===
In October 2007 Nish rejected Kilmarnock's offer of a new contract which meant that he was able to talk to other clubs from January 2008, with a view to a Bosman transfer in the summer. Nish signed a pre-contract with boyhood heroes Hibernian and the next day the two clubs agreed a deal to transfer Nish immediately. Nish made his debut for Hibernian on 9 February 2008, in a 1–1 draw to Dundee United. Nish scored his first goal for Hibernian ten minutes into his home debut against Gretna at Easter Road.

Towards the end of the 2009–10 season, Nish described the Hibernian fans as "moaners" following an Edinburgh derby defeat. Nish soon apologised for those remarks, calling for unity between players and supporters ahead of an important match against Motherwell. Nish scored a hat-trick in the first half of that match, yet Hibernian only managed a 6–6 draw, in the highest scoring SPL match in league history. Nish then scored both goals in a 2–0 win at Tannadice Park that secured a UEFA Europa League place for Hibernian.

Early in the 2010–11 season, however, Nish was again the target for criticism from the Hibernian fans, with manager Colin Calderwood expressing his sympathy for the player. Nish was allowed to train with Chinese Super League club Tianjin Teda during January 2011, but Nish then decided to stay at Easter Road. The signings of Akpo Sodje and Ricardo Vaz Tê pushed Nish out of the Hibernian starting eleven and he was advised in April 2011 that his contract would not be renewed.

=== Hartlepool United ===
Nish signed for Hartlepool United on a free transfer on 27 June 2011. Nish missed a penalty in Hartlepool's League Cup first round penalty shoot-out defeat to Sheffield United. Nish scored his first goal for Hartlepool in the 1–1 draw against Walsall on 13 August 2011. Nish then scored two goals in a 3–0 win over Bury during the month of September. Nish sustained an injury against Charlton in October 2011 that prevented him from playing for two months, during which time Hartlepool appointed a new manager. Nish did not feature often under the club's new manager Neale Cooper, a former player of Aberdeen and Rangers.

Nish's former club Kilmarnock attempted to sign Nish on loan during August 2012, after Paul Heffernan suffered an injury but were unfortunately unable to secure his services. Dundee signed Nish on loan until January 2013. Nish scored two goals for a struggling Dundee team during his initial loan spell, which was extended until the end of the 2012–13 season. Hartlepool announced on 7 May 2013 that Nish's contract would not be renewed for the 2013–14 season.

=== Dumbarton ===
Nish signed for Scottish Championship club Dumbarton in August 2013. As well as playing for the first team, Nish would also be in-charge of Dumbarton's under-19s. Nish scored one goal and created another in his debut for Dumbarton, in a 3–1 win over Morton on 24 August 2013. On 26 June 2014 Nish signed a new one-year deal with the Sons following a productive second half to the season which included the goal which took the Sons to their first Scottish Cup quarter final in over 30 years. Nish departed Dumbarton in January 2015.

=== Cowdenbeath ===
Nish joined Scottish Championship club Cowdenbeath in January 2015 on an 18-month contract following his release from Dumbarton.

== Coaching career ==
On 2 June 2015, Nish was named as the new player-manager of Scottish League One club Cowdenbeath, following the resignation of Jimmy Nicholl. Nish's tenure lasted only one season however, with the club suffering their second successive relegation, this time to Scottish League Two. His contract was terminated in May 2016, less than a year after his appointment.

He then took a position coaching youth players at Hibernian. After a few years of coaching Hibernian youth and reserve teams, Nish became the manager of Lowland League side Tranent Juniors in September 2022. He subsequently left the club when his contract ended in May 2023.

== Personal life ==
In September 2023, Nish was found guilty of assaulting his former partner. Following a trial at Edinburgh Sheriff Court, he was banned from having any contact with the woman for 12 months and was fined £500 with a supplement charge of £20.

== Managerial statistics ==
As of match played 7 May 2016

Team	From	To	Record				
Team	From	To	G	W	D	L	Win %
Cowdenbeath	2 June 2015	12 May 2016	43	13	7	23	30.23

== See also ==
- List of Scottish Premier League hat-tricks
