= John Cosgrove =

John Cosgrove may refer to:

- John Cosgrove (actor) (1867–1925), Australian actor, writer and director
- John Cosgrove (Florida politician) (1949–2006), American politician from Florida
- John Cosgrove (Missouri politician) (1839–1925), U.S. Representative from Missouri
- John Cosgrove (Virginia politician) (born 1954), American politician and member of the Senate of Virginia
- John M. G. Cosgrove (born 1949), Garda Síochána and recipient of the Scott Medal

== See also ==
- Jack Cosgrove (disambiguation)
