= Éric Deloumeaux =

French footballer (born 1973)

Personal information
- Full name: Éric Jean Deloumeaux
- Date of birth: 12 May 1973 (age 53)
- Place of birth: Montbéliard, France
- Height: 1.77 m (5 ft 9 1/2 in)
- Position: Defender

Youth career
- –1996: Lons-Le-Saunier
- 1996–1997: Dijon

Senior career*
Years	Team	Apps	(Gls)
1997–1999	Gueugnon	57	(1)
1999–2001	Le Havre	65	(3)
2001–2002	Motherwell	23	(0)
2002–2004	Aberdeen	43	(4)
2004–2005	Coventry City	21	(1)
2005	Livingston	13	(1)
2006–2009	U.S. Quevilly	10	(0)
2009–2011	CMS Oissel	6	(0)
2011–2012	FCM Aubervilliers	2	(0)
- * Club domestic league appearances and goals as of 1 June 2005

Éric Jean Deloumeaux (born 12 May 1973) is a French former football player. He spent his career in his native France and with a number of British clubs, including Coventry City (scoring once against Millwall) and Livingston (scoring once against Dundee United).
