= Jack Cosgrove =

Jack Cosgrove may refer to:

- Jack Cosgrove (American football) (born 1956), American college football coach
- Jack Cosgrove (Gaelic footballer) (born 1949), Irish former sportsperson
- Jack Cosgrove (rugby union) (born 1994), Scottish rugby union player
- Jack Cosgrove (special effects artist) (1902–1965), American special effects artist

== See also ==
- John Cosgrove (disambiguation)
