= James Cosgrave (cricketer) =

Australian cricketer

Personal information
- Born: 16 March 1932 (age 94); Melbourne, Australia
- Batting: Right-handed

Domestic team information
- Years: Team
- 1956/57: Victoria
- Source: Cricinfo, 3 December 2015

James Cosgrave (born 16 March 1932) is an Australian former cricketer. He played three first-class cricket matches for Victoria between 1956 and 1957.
