= Motherwell F.C. 6–6 Hibernian F.C. =

Motherwell 6–6 Hibernian
- Event: 2009–10 Scottish Premier League
Motherwell	Hibernian
6	6
- Date: 5 May 2010
- Venue: Fir Park, Motherwell
- Referee: Willie Collum
- Attendance: 6,241

The Scottish Premier League match between Motherwell and Hibernian on 5 May 2010 set a record as the highest scoring match in the league's history. The match was played at Fir Park in Motherwell and twelve goals were scored in the match, leaving a final scoreline of a 6–6 draw. Hibernian had led the match 4–1 and 6–2 at different points; Hibs goalkeeper Graeme Smith also saved a penalty kick from Ross Forbes when the score was 6–5.

== Match ==
=== Background ===
The match was the 37th and penultimate game of the 2009–10 league season for both Motherwell and Hibs, with both clubs chasing fourth place in the Scottish Premier League and with it qualification for the 2010–11 UEFA Europa League competition. Going into the match, Motherwell were one point ahead of Hibs, but were faced with a more difficult fixture in their final game, being due to play Rangers at Ibrox. Therefore, a win for Motherwell would clinch fourth place, a win for Hibs would make them strong favourites for the position, while a draw would leave Motherwell with a one-point advantage, but with a slightly worse goal difference.

As the match was being televised by Sky Sports and was being played in midweek, Motherwell specially reduced the admission prices to ensure a good attendance. Due to that television coverage, the match had been originally scheduled for the evening of 6 May, the same day as the 2010 general election. Motherwell complained to the league about this scheduling, citing the proximity of a polling station to their home ground of Fir Park. The league upheld this complaint and moved the match forward 24 hours to Wednesday, 5 May.

=== Summary ===
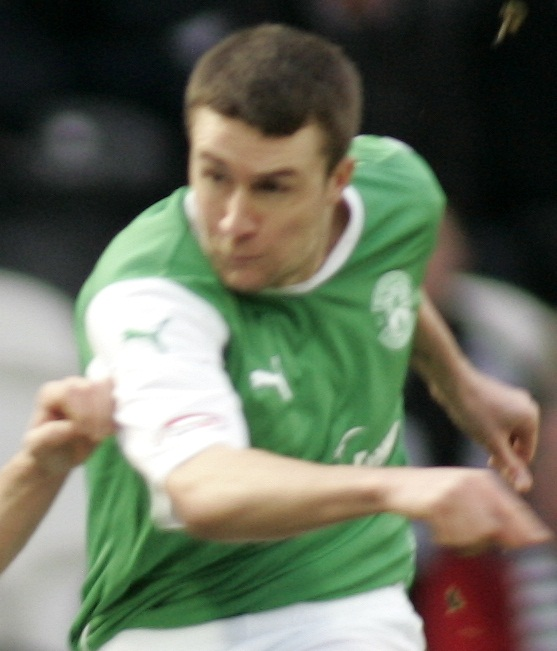
Colin Nish scored a first half hat-trick.

Hibs raced into a 4–1 lead in the first half, thanks to a hat-trick by Colin Nish. Giles Coke had equalised for Motherwell after Nish opened the scoring, but had then gifted Hibs their third goal, scored by Derek Riordan. Motherwell did pull a goal back before half-time through John Sutton, but two goals by Anthony Stokes after the restart seemingly put the game beyond doubt at 6–2. Within 15 minutes, however, Motherwell had reduced the deficit to 6–5, thanks to a simple tap-in by Coke, a Tom Hateley free kick and a Sutton header from close range. Substitute Ross Forbes then had the chance to equalise from a penalty kick with three minutes left, but it was saved by Graeme Smith, who had conceded the penalty in the first place. Forbes had taken the penalty despite the fact that Lukas Jutkiewicz was the nominated penalty taker; Jutkiewicz had deferred to Forbes as he was fresher, having only come on less than 10 minutes previously. In the third minute of injury time, Jutkiewicz produced a remarkable effort to score the equaliser, a goal that his manager Craig Brown compared to Marco van Basten's goal in the 1988 European Championship Final.

=== Details ===
5 May 2010
19:45 BST

Motherwell	6–6	Hibernian
Coke 16', 67'; Sutton 39', 76'; Hateley 72'; Jutkiewicz 90+3'	BBC Sport report	Nish 11', 20', 36'; Riordan 28'; Stokes 56', 65'

Fir Park, Motherwell
Attendance: 6,241
Referee: Willie Collum

Motherwell	Hibernian

GK	21	(England) John Ruddy
RB	43	(Scotland) Steven Saunders	(substituted off) 69'
CB	5	(Northern Ireland) Stephen Craigan (c)
CB	4	(Scotland) Mark Reynolds
LB	3	(Scotland) Steven Hammell
DM	24	(England) Tom Hateley	(substituted off) 80'
CM	17	(Republic of Ireland) Jim O'Brien
CM	6	(England) Giles Coke
RW	11	(England) John Sutton
LW	15	(Scotland) Jamie Murphy	(substituted off) 69'
CF	9	(England) Lukas Jutkiewicz
Substitutes:
GK	1	(Scotland) Michael Fraser
DF	28	(England) Shaun Hutchinson
MF	7	(England) Chris Humphrey	(substituted on) 69'
MF	16	(Scotland) Marc Fitzpatrick
MF	18	(New Zealand) Michael McGlinchey	(substituted on) 69'
FW	27	(Scotland) Ross Forbes	(substituted on) 80'
FW	35	(Scotland) Robert McHugh
Manager:
(Scotland) Craig Brown

GK	21	(Scotland) Graeme Smith
CB	15	(France) Steven Thicot
CB	4	(England) Chris Hogg (c)
CB	20	(Scotland) Paul Hanlon
RM	18	(Republic of Ireland) Anthony Stokes	(substituted off) 88'
CM	33	(Republic of Ireland) Liam Miller
CM	11	(Scotland) John Rankin
LM	6	(Scotland) Ian Murray
AM	24	(Scotland) David Wotherspoon
CF	10	(Scotland) Derek Riordan	(substituted off) 70'
CF	9	(Scotland) Colin Nish
Substitutes:
GK	50	(Democratic Republic of the Congo) Yves Ma-Kalambay
DF	25	(Scotland) Darren McCormack
MF	8	(Republic of Ireland) Patrick Cregg
MF	16	(Scotland) Lewis Stevenson
MF	17	(Scotland) Kevin McBride	(substituted on) 70'
FW	19	(Morocco) Abdessalam Benjelloun	(substituted on) 88'
FW	28	(Scotland) Alan Gow
Manager:
(Scotland) John Hughes

== Post-match reaction ==
"I was quite calm throughout. I was very pleased with the response from the players when they went behind. I said to them that the worst thing in any sport is a losing lead. We were behind at half time, and I said if we pull Hibs back they would have a fit of the jitters, and that's how it transpired."

- Motherwell manager Craig Brown

"I think it is self-explanatory, everyone will say we cannot defend. I felt my strikers stopped working. And that is where you start defending from. They stopped looking after the ball and it brought Motherwell on top of us. We sat too deep."

- Hibs manager John Hughes

== Aftermath ==
The result left Motherwell one point ahead of Hibs with just one game to play. In their final game, Motherwell produced another remarkable comeback to salvage a 3–3 draw against Rangers, despite having been 3–1 behind entering injury time. This comeback was insufficient to hold onto fourth place, however, as Hibs won their game 2–0 against Dundee United. Colin Nish scored both goals, giving him five goals in the final two games of the season. This win allowed Hibs to leapfrog Motherwell by a point and to qualify for the UEFA Europa League.

The result of the 2010 Scottish Cup Final, with the already-qualified Dundee United beating First Division club Ross County, meant that Motherwell also qualified for Europe, however. The cup final result also benefitted Hibs, as they entered the competition one round later than if Ross County had won.
