= Karl Ready =

Welsh footballer

Personal information
- Full name: Karl Ready
- Date of birth: 14 August 1972 (age 54)
- Place of birth: Neath, Wales
- Height: 6 ft 1 in (1.85 m)
- Position: Defender

Youth career
- Queens Park Rangers

Senior career*
Years	Team	Apps	(Gls)
1990–2001	Queens Park Rangers	227	(10)
2001–2002	Motherwell	36	(3)
2002–2003	Aldershot Town	16	(1)
2003	Aylesbury United	5	(1)
2003–2004	Crawley Town		
2004	Farnborough Town	0	(0)

International career
1997–1998	Wales	5	(0)
- * Club domestic league appearances and goals

Karl Ready (born 14 August 1972) is a Welsh former professional footballer who played as a defender.

He notably played for Queens Park Rangers over an eleven-year spell that saw numerous seasons playing in the Premier League and saw him awarded the Player of the Season award for the 1997–98 campaign. He then played in the Scottish Premier League for Motherwell before spending his final two seasons playing competitive football for Non-League sides Aldershot Town, Aylesbury United, Crawley Town and Farnborough Town. During his career, he gained five international caps for Wales.

== Club career ==
Ready began his career at Queens Park Rangers where he went on to make over 250 appearances during an eleven-year spell with the club. During a match with Crewe Alexandra in August 2000, Ready suffered a broken ankle and a number of complications during his recovery resulted in him missing the majority of the start of the 2000–01 season. In 2001, he was released, joining Scottish Premier League side Motherwell where he spent just one season, leaving when the club entered administration and subsequently cancelled the majority of their players' contracts.

He returned to England, joining Aldershot Town. However, he was released by the club during the 2002–03 season and signed for Aylesbury United several months later, making his debut in the opening game of the 2003–04 season on 16 August 2003, converting a penalty during a 3–2 win over Billericay Town. He spent one month at Bell Close before moving to Crawley Town. In July 2004 he signed with Farnborough Town but left the club by mutual consent one month later having not played a game.

== International career ==
Ready made appearances for both the Wales under-21 and B sides before making his senior debut on 11 February 1997 during a 0–0 draw with Republic of Ireland. He appeared in three of Wales' next seven matches before winning his fifth and final cap on 6 June 1998 in a 4–0 defeat against Tunisia.

== Personal life ==
In November 1997, Ready and his friend were punched and kicked during a drunken street brawl in Bicester. One of his attackers was jailed for 28 days in May 1998.

In 2001, Ready was arrested for punching a taxi driver outside a nightclub in Barbados.
