= Yann Soloy =

French footballer (born 1970)

Personal information
- Date of birth: 15 February 1970 (age 56)
- Place of birth: Dieppe, France
- Height: 1.74 m (5 ft 8 1/2 in)
- Position: Midfielder

Senior career*
Years	Team	Apps	(Gls)
1987–1995	FC Rouen	162	(21)
1995–1997	CS Louhans-Cuiseaux	64	(9)
1997–2001	Le Havre AC	79	(4)
2001–2002	Motherwell	12	(1)
2002–2005	FC Dieppe	62	(10)
- * Club domestic league appearances and goals

Yann Soloy (born 15 February 1970) is a retired French professional football player. Soloy joined Scottish club Motherwell in December 2001. He scored his first and only goal for the club in a 2–1 loss to Livingston on 1 February 2002. He left Motherwell in April 2002 when they went into administration.
