= David Ferrère =

French footballer (born 1974)

Personal information
- Date of birth: 30 May 1974 (age 52)
- Place of birth: Saint-Denis, Réunion
- Height: 1.66 m (5 ft 5 1/2 in)
- Position: Midfielder

Youth career
- 1989–1990: RC Paris

Senior career*
Years	Team	Apps	(Gls)
1990–1999	AS Beauvais		
1999–2002	CS Louhans-Cuiseaux	61	(4)
2002	Motherwell	10	(3)
2003–2005	L'Entente SSG	69	(15)
2005–2006	FC Dieppe	23	(2)
2006	SS Excelsior		
2006–2007	FC Avirons		
- * Club domestic league appearances and goals

David Ferrère (born 30 May 1974) is a retired French footballer. He last played as a midfielder for FC Avirons.

== Career ==
Ferrère began his youth career with RC Paris before joining AS Beauvais as a sixteen-year-old at the start of the 1990s. Spending the majority of the decade with Beauvais, he moved on to CS Louhans-Cuiseaux in 1999, spending two years with the side. In early 2002, Ferrère joined Scottish side Motherwell, scoring a hat-trick on his debut during his short-term stay at Fir Park. Returning to France, Ferrère played with Entente Sannois Saint-Gratien, FC Dieppe, SS Excelsior before joining FC Avirons.

=== Motherwell ===
After being released by CS Louhans-Cuiseaux in 2001, Ferrère was unable to find a new club and had been training with FC Metz. Motherwell manager Eric Black, who was previously a Metz player, became aware of Ferrère's availability and signed him on an 18-month contract. Ferrère played in ten Scottish Premier League matches and scored three goals for Motherwell, all of them coming in a hat-trick on his debut, as a second-half substitute, against Hibernian.

Ferrère was one of the 19 players made redundant when Motherwell entered administration less than three months later.

== See also ==
- List of Scottish Premier League hat-tricks
