= Franck Bernhard =

French footballer (born 1976)

Personal information
- Date of birth: March 7, 1976 (age 50)
- Place of birth: Strasbourg, France
- Height: 1.90 m (6 ft 3 in)
- Position: Defender

Youth career
- Duppigheim
- Ernolsheim sur Bruche
- CF Clairfontaine
- Strasbourg

Senior career*
Years	Team	Apps	(Gls)
1996–1998	Strasbourg	2	(0)
1998–2001	Cercle Brugge	51	(1)
2001–2002	Motherwell	3	(0)
2003–2004	Fontenay	7	(0)
2004–2006	Mulhouse		
2006–2007	Obernai		
- SC Dinsheim
- * Club domestic league appearances and goals

Franck Bernhard (born March 7, 1976) is a retired French professional football player.
