= Ivo den Bieman =

Dutch footballer (born 1967)

Personal information
- Date of birth: 4 February 1967 (age 59)
- Place of birth: Wamel, Netherlands
- Positions: Defender; midfielder

Senior career*
Years	Team	Apps	(Gls)
1989–1990	SV Leones		
1990–1992	Montrose	78	(11)
1992–1993	Dundee	24	(3)
1993–1998	Dunfermline	139	(10)
1998	Ross County	2	(0)
1998–1999	Falkirk	24	(0)
2000	Falkirk	15	(1)
- * Club domestic league appearances and goals as of 20 July 2007

Ivo den Bieman (born 4 February 1967 in Wamel, Gelderland) is a Dutch retired footballer who played the majority of his career in Scotland. He moved to Scotland in 1990 to attend Aberdeen University having previously played for Dutch amateur side SV Leones.

== Club career ==
He was signed by Montrose in 1990 and helped the club to promotion to the Scottish First Division in his first season. The club were relegated the following season but after impressing in the final game of the season against promoted club Dundee, Den Bieman was signed by the Premier Division newcomers in the summer of 1992. He remained at Dens Park for just one season before moving back to the First Division with Dunfermline Athletic. Whilst at Dunfermline, he formed a partnership with Hamish French, many calling them 'Fish & Chips' because you couldn't think of one without the other. Initially signed as a right-winger, Den Bieman found himself playing a variety of positions including full-back and centre-half. With his versatility and famed long throw's he soon gained cult status with the Pars support and was voted runner up in a recent poll of Dunfermline's all time cult heroes.

Den Bieman remained at Dunfermline for five years, helping them to promotion in 1995-96. He was released in 1998 and had spells with Ross County and Falkirk before retiring in 2000.

After returning to the Netherlands he continued to play in the Dutch amateur leagues for Bennekom whilst working in security.

== Later years ==
He worked in the retail business and was team manager at Bennekom. He also coached youth teams of his first club Leones and was the assistant manager of their senior team in the 2016/17 season.
