= James Cosgrove (politician) =

American politician (1861–1911)

James Cosgrove (August 26, 1861 – March 26, 1911) was a businessman, politician, and developer in South Carolina. He served four terms in the South Carolina House of Representatives, and had previously served two terms as mayor of Sullivan's Island, South Carolina. Cosgrove Avenue was named in his honor. A native of Charleston, Cosgrove was involved in real estate and insurance.

He was Irish. He went to various schools including the High School of Charleston. He ran a mineral water and beverage business in Charleston, South Carolina with his father.
