= 2002–03 Scottish First Division =

Scottish First Division
- Season: 2002–03
- Champions: Falkirk
- Relegated: Alloa Athletic; Arbroath
- Top goalscorer: Owen Coyle (20)

The 2002–03 Scottish First Division was won by Falkirk. However, they were not promoted to the SPL because their stadium, Brockville Park, did not meet SPL criteria. Alloa Athletic and Arbroath were relegated to the Second Division.

== League table ==
Pos	Team	Pld	W	D	L	GF	GA	GD	Pts	Promotion or relegation
1	Falkirk (C)	36	25	6	5	80	32	+48	81	
2	Clyde	36	21	9	6	66	37	+29	72	
3	St Johnstone	36	20	7	9	49	29	+20	67	
4	Inverness CT	36	20	5	11	74	45	+29	65	
5	Queen of the South	36	12	12	12	45	48	−3	48	
6	Ayr United	36	12	9	15	34	44	−10	45	
7	St Mirren	36	9	10	17	42	71	−29	37	
8	Ross County	36	9	8	19	42	46	−4	35	
9	Alloa Athletic (R)	36	9	8	19	39	72	−33	35	Relegation to the Second Division
10	Arbroath (R)	36	3	6	27	30	77	−47	15	Relegation to the Second Division

Source: "2002-2003 First Division - SPFL Archive". SPFL.
Rules for classification: 1) points; 2) goal difference; 3) number of goals scored.
(C) Champions; (R) Relegated

== Attendances ==
The average attendances for Scottish First Division clubs for season 2002/03 are shown below:

Club	Average
Falkirk	4,165
Ross County	2,706
St Mirren	2,697
St Johnstone	2,616
Inverness CT	2,182
Queen of the South	2,152
Ayr United	1,897
Clyde	1,321
Alloa Athletic	828
Arbroath	759
