= Bill Cosgrove =

Australian rules footballer

Personal information
- Full name: William Nicholas Pax Cosgrove
- Born: 11 November 1918; Randwick, New South Wales
- Died: 11 August 1943 (aged 24); Solomon Sea, off Goodenough Island, Milne Bay, Territory of New Guinea
- Original team: Xavier College
- Height: 188 cm (6 ft 2 in)
- Weight: 82 kg (181 lb)

Playing career^{1}
Years	Club	Games (Goals)
1940	Richmond	3 (0)
- ^{1} Playing statistics correct to the end of 1940.

William Nicholas Pax Cosgrove (11 November 1918 – 11 August 1943) was an Australian rules footballer who played with Richmond in the Victorian Football League (VFL). He served in the RAAF during World War II, and was killed in action in 1943 when his plane crashed.

== Family ==
The son of John Nereus Cosgrove (1867–1925), and Madelaine Mary Stephanie Cosgrove (1884–1933), née Tracey, William Nicholas Pax Cosgrove was born on 11 November 1918, Armistice Day—he was named "Pax" (Latin for peace) in recognition of that fact. He married Dorothy May McLean (1920-) in 1940.

Cosgrove's nephew, Peter Cosgrove, became Chief of the Defence Force and Governor-General of Australia.

== Football ==
He was a "talented and courageous" centre half-back, recruited by Richmond in 1939, who played in three senior games for Richmond in 1940, and played in 34 games for Richmond's Second XVIII over the period 1939–1942.

Showing his loyalty to his VFL team, he decorated his RAAF planes with the Richmond logo and the slogan "Eat 'em alive".

Richmond's award for its best first year player is now known as the Bill Cosgrove/Harry Jenkins Trophy, in honour of both Cosgrove and the Tasmanian-based Richmond talent scout Harry Jenkins.

== Military service ==
He was killed in action on 11 August 1943. While flying between Vivigani and Bola in the Territory of New Guinea, Flight Sergeant Cosgrove's plane crashed into the Solomon Sea off Goodenough Island, killing him and Flight Sergeant Bernard Le Griffon.

== See also ==
- List of Victorian Football League players who died on active service
