= Stephen Cosgrove (footballer) =

Scottish footballer

Personal information
- Full name: Stephen Cosgrove
- Date of birth: 29 December 1980 (age 45)
- Place of birth: Glasgow, Scotland
- Position: Midfielder

Youth career
- 1997–1999: Manchester United

Senior career*
Years	Team	Apps	(Gls)
1999–2001	Manchester United	0	(0)
2001–2002	Motherwell	2	(0)
2002	→ Stirling Albion (loan)	10	(0)
2002–2003	Clyde	20	(0)
2003–2005	Gretna	9	(1)
2004	→ Stenhousemuir (loan)	14	(0)
- * Club domestic league appearances and goals as of 13:28, 29 August 2008 (UTC)

Stephen Cosgrove (born 29 December 1980 in Glasgow), is a Scottish footballer, who plays as a midfielder.

== Club career ==
Cosgrove began his career with Manchester United. After an unsuccessful trial with Ipswich Town, he returned to Scotland in 2001 to join Motherwell, where he made a handful of appearances. He was one of 19 players controversially released by the Lanarkshire side when they entered into administration in April 2002. Stephen then joined Clyde where he featured in the team which finished runners up in the Scottish First Division. He then left Clyde to join ambitious Gretna, where he played for two years.
