= 2006–07 Motherwell F.C. season =

Motherwell
2006–07 season
- Chairman: John Boyle
- Manager: Maurice Malpas
- Premier League: 10th
- Scottish Cup: Quarter-finals
- League Cup: Quarter-finals
- Top goalscorer: League: Scott McDonald (15); All: Scott McDonald (16)
- Highest home attendance: 11,745 vs Rangers; 29 July 2006
- Lowest home attendance: 3,640 vs Falkirk; 28 April 2007
- Average home league attendance: 5,877
Home colours	Away colours

The 2006–07 season was Motherwell's 9th season in the Scottish Premier League, and their 22nd consecutive season in the top division of Scottish football. It was Maurice Malpas first, and only, season as manager of Motherwell having replaced Terry Butcher who had left to join Sydney FC at the end of the previous season, and himself sacked following the conclusion of the season.

== Season events ==
On 21 April, Motherwell announced the signing of Brian McLean to a three-year contract from Rangers, to commence on 1 June. Whilst Phil O'Donnell signed a new one-year contract and Colin Meldrum a new two-year contract.

On 1 June, Motherwell announced that Jim Paterson had signed a new contract with the club, until the summer of 2008.

On 11 July, Motherwell announced the signing of Ross McCormack to a two-year contract from Rangers.

On 18 August, Motherwell announced the return of Keith Lasley to the club on a two-year contract after leaving Plymouth Argyle in the summer.

On 25 August, Motherwell announced the signing of Calum Elliot from Heart of Midlothian on loan until the end of the year.

On 29 November, Motherwell announced that they had signed new contracts with David Clarkson and Mark Reynolds, both until the summer of 2010.

On 1 January, Motherwell announced the signing of Danny Murphy from Cork City on a contract until 2009, and the signings of Paul Keegan and Trevor Molloy from St Patrick's Athletic both on contracts until the summer of 2008.

On 31 January, Motherwell announced the signing of Krisztián Vadócz on loan for the remainder of the season from AJ Auxerre.

On 30 March, it was announced that Motherwell and Celtic had agreed a deal for Scott McDonald, rumoured to be for £700,000, with the Australian forward joining Celtic at the start of the 2007–08 season.

On 1 May, Motherwell announced that Phil O'Donnell had signed a new one-year contract with the club as a player-coach.

== Squad ==
As of match played 19 May 2007

No.	Name	Nationality	Position	Date of birth (age)	Signed from	Signed in	Contract ends	Apps.	Goals
Goalkeepers
1	Graeme Smith	(Scotland)	GK	8 June 1983 (aged 23)	Rangers	2005		62	0
18	Colin Meldrum	(Scotland)	GK	26 November 1975 (aged 31)	Forfar Athletic	2005	2008	27	0
	Alan Martin	(Scotland)	GK	1 January 1989 (aged 18)	Academy	2006		0	0
Defenders
2	Martyn Corrigan	(Scotland)	DF	14 August 1977 (aged 29)	Falkirk	2000		266	6
3	Danny Murphy	(Republic of Ireland)	DF	4 December 1982 (aged 24)	Cork City	2007	2009	16	1
5	Stephen Craigan	(Northern Ireland)	DF	29 October 1976 (aged 30)	Partick Thistle	2003		189	9
6	Brian McLean	(Northern Ireland)	DF	28 February 1985 (aged 22)	Rangers	2006	2009	38	3
11	Jim Paterson	(Scotland)	DF	25 September 1979 (aged 27)	Dundee United	2004	2008	97	6
15	William Kinniburgh	(Scotland)	DF	8 September 1984 (aged 22)	Youth team	2000		63	3
19	Paul Quinn	(Scotland)	DF	21 July 1985 (aged 21)	Youth team	2002		109	2
24	Bobby Donnelly	(Scotland)	DF	19 January 1987 (aged 20)	Youth team	2003		6	0
30	Mark Reynolds	(Scotland)	DF	7 May 1987 (aged 20)	Youth team	2004	2010	42	2
Midfielders
4	Brian Kerr	(Scotland)	MF	12 October 1981 (aged 25)	Newcastle United	2004		90	7
10	Phil O'Donnell	(Scotland)	MF	25 March 1972 (aged 35)	Sheffield Wednesday	2004	2008	214	25
14	Steven McGarry	(Scotland)	MF	28 September 1979 (aged 27)	Ross County	2006		40	2
17	Kevin McBride	(Scotland)	MF	14 June 1981 (aged 25)	Celtic	2005		73	8
20	Marc Fitzpatrick	(Scotland)	MF	11 May 1986 (aged 21)	Youth team	2002		69	4
22	Keith Lasley	(Scotland)	MF	21 September 1979 (aged 27)	Unattached	2006	2008	126	10
23	Darren Smith	(Scotland)	MF	27 March 1988 (aged 19)	Youth team	2004		22	4
26	Kenny Connolly	(Scotland)	MF	4 April 1987 (aged 20)	Youth team	2004		3	0
29	Stephen Maguire	(Scotland)	MF	14 February 1987 (aged 20)	Youth team	2004		4	0
31	Krisztián Vadócz	(Hungary)	MF	30 May 1985 (aged 21)	on loan from AJ Auxerre	2007	2007	11	0
Forwards
7	Scott McDonald	(Australia)	FW	21 August 1983 (aged 23)	Wimbledon	2004		125	45
8	Ross McCormack	(Scotland)	FW	18 August 1986 (aged 20)	Rangers	2006	2008	15	3
12	David Clarkson	(Scotland)	FW	10 September 1985 (aged 21)	Youth team	2002	2010	173	28
13	Paul Keegan	(Republic of Ireland)	FW	30 December 1972 (aged 34)	St Patrick's Athletic	2007	2008	10	0
15	Trevor Molloy	(Republic of Ireland)	FW	14 April 1977 (aged 30)	St Patrick's Athletic	2007	2008	8	0
27	Adam Coakley	(Scotland)	FW	19 October 1987 (aged 19)	Youth team	2003		4	0
40	Jamie Murphy	(Scotland)	FW	28 August 1989 (aged 17)	Youth team	2006		2	0
Away on loan
Left during the season
9	Richie Foran	(Republic of Ireland)	FW	16 June 1980 (aged 26)	Carlisle United	2004		105	35
16	Jim Hamilton	(Scotland)	FW	9 February 1976 (aged 31)	Livingston	2005	2007	55	13
31	Calum Elliot	(Scotland)	FW	30 March 1987 (aged 20)	on loan from Heart of Midlothian	2006	2006	17	2

== Transfers ==
=== In ===
Date	Position	Nationality	Name	From	Fee	Ref.
1 June 2006	DF	(Northern Ireland)	Brian McLean	Rangers	Undisclosed	
11 July 2006	FW	(Scotland)	Ross McCormack	Rangers	Undisclosed	
18 August 2006	MF	(Scotland)	Keith Lasley	Unattached	Free	
1 January 2007	DF	(Republic of Ireland)	Danny Murphy	Cork City	Undisclosed	
1 January 2007	MF	(Republic of Ireland)	Paul Keegan	St Patrick's Athletic	Undisclosed	
1 January 2007	FW	(Republic of Ireland)	Trevor Molloy	St Patrick's Athletic	Undisclosed	

=== Loans in ===
Date from	Position	Nationality	Name	From	Date to	Ref.
31 August 2006	FW	(Scotland)	Calum Elliot	Hearts	31 December 2006	
31 January 2007	MF	(Hungary)	Krisztian Vadocz	Auxerre	End of Season	

=== Out ===
Date	Position	Nationality	Name	To	Fee	Ref.
29 August 2006	FW	(Scotland)	Jim Hamilton	Dunfermline Athletic	Undisclosed	
31 August 2006	GK	(Scotland)	Alan Martin	Leeds United	Undisclosed	
31 January 2007	FW	(Republic of Ireland)	Richie Foran	Southend United	£150,000	

=== Loans out ===
Date from	Position	Nationality	Name	To	Date to	Ref.
30 December 2006	MF	(Scotland)	Shaun Fagan	Stenhousemuir	30 January 2007	

=== Released ===
Date	Position	Nationality	Name	Joined	Date	Ref.
31 May 2007	MF	(Scotland)	Shaun Fagan	Galway United	July 2007	
31 May 2007	MF	(Scotland)	Brian Kerr	Hibernian	1 July 2007	

== Competitions ==
=== Overview ===
Competition	First match	Last match	Starting round	Final position	Record							
Competition	First match	Last match	Starting round	Final position	Pld	W	D	L	GF	GA	GD	Win %
Premier League	30 July 2006	19 May 2007	Matchday 1	10th	38	10	8	20	41	61	−20	26.32
Scottish Cup	6 January 2007	28 February 2007	Third Round	Quarter-final	3	2	0	1	4	2	+2	66.67
League Cup	22 August 2006	7 November 2006	Second Round	Quarter-final	3	2	0	1	8	5	+3	66.67
Total					44	14	8	22	53	68	−15	31.82

Last updated: 19 May 2007
Source: Competitions

=== Premier League ===
==== Classification ====
Pos	Team	Pld	W	D	L	GF	GA	GD	Pts	Qualification or relegation (Note: Teams played each other three times (33 matches), before the league split into two groups (the top six and the bottom six) for the last five matches.)
8	Inverness Caledonian Thistle	38	11	13	14	42	48	−6	46	
9	Dundee United	38	10	12	16	40	59	−19	42	
10	Motherwell	38	10	8	20	41	61	−20	38	
11	St Mirren	38	8	12	18	31	51	−20	36	
12	Dunfermline Athletic (R)	38	8	8	22	26	55	−29	32	Relegation to the Scottish First Division and qualification for UEFA Cup second qualifying round (Note: As Celtic, the Scottish Cup winners, qualified for the Champions League via their league position, the place in the UEFA Cup was passed to Dunfermline Athletic, the cup runner-up.)

Source: Scottish Professional Football League
Rules for classification: 1) Points; 2) Goal difference; 3) Goals scored
(R) Relegated

==== Results summary ====
Overall								Home						Away					
Pld	W	D	L	GF	GA	GD	Pts	W	D	L	GF	GA	GD	W	D	L	GF	GA	GD
38	10	8	20	41	61	−20	38	5	3	11	25	34	−9	5	5	9	16	27	−11

Source: BBC Sport

==== Results by round ====
Round	1	2	3	4	5	6	7	8	9	10	11	12	13	14	15	16	17	18	19	20	21	22	23	24	25	26	27	28	29	30	31	32	33	34	35	36	37	38
Ground	H	A	H	A	A	H	A	A	H	H	A	A	H	A	H	H	A	A	H	A	A	H	H	A	A	H	A	H	A	H	H	H	A	A	H	A	H	A
Result	L	L	L	L	W	L	L	D	W	W	L	D	D	L	L	W	W	L	L	W	W	D	L	L	W	W	D	L	D	L	W	L	L	L	D	L	L	D
Position	11	12	12	12	11	12	12	12	12	10	10	10	10	11	11	10	9	11	11	10	8	9	10	10	10	9	8	9	9	9	9	9	10	10	10	10	10	10

Source: BBC Sport
A = Away; H = Home; W = Win; D = Draw; L = Loss

==== Results ====
Date	Opponent	Venue	Result	Attendance	Motherwell Scorer(s)	Report
30 July 2006	Rangers	Fir Park, Motherwell (H)	1–2	11,745	Phil O'Donnell	Fir Park Corner
5 August 2006	St Mirren	Love Street, Paisley (A)	0–2	5,036		Fir Park Corner
12 August 2006	Aberdeen	Fir Park, Motherwell (H)	0–2	5,186		Fir Park Corner
19 August 2006	Hibernian	Easter Road, Edinburgh (A)	1–3	13,274	Scott McDonald	Fir Park Corner
26 August 2006	Falkirk	Falkirk Stadium, Falkirk (A)	1–0	4,594	Scott McDonald	Fir Park Corner
9 September 2006	Inverness CT	Fir Park, Motherwell (H)	1–4	4,091	Scott McDonald	Fir Park Corner
9 September 2006	Hearts	Fir Park, Motherwell (H)	0–1	5,931		Fir Park Corner
23 September 2006	Dundee United	Tannadice, Dundee (A)	1–1	5,036	Calum Elliot	Fir Park Corner
30 September 2006	Kilmarnock	Fir Park, Motherwell (H)	5–0	4,765	Richie Foran, Mark Reynolds, Brian Kerr, Scott McDonald (2)	Fir Park Corner
14 October 2006	Dunfermline	Fir Park, Motherwell (H)	2–1	4,527	Scott McDonald, David Clarkson	Fir Park Corner
21 October 2006	Celtic	Celtic Park, Glasgow (A)	1–2	57,742	Scott McDonald	Fir Park Corner
28 October 2006	Rangers	Ibrox Stadium, Glasgow (A)	1–1	49,785	Brian Kerr	Fir Park Corner
4 November 2006	St Mirren	Fir Park, Motherwell (H)	0–0	5,337		Fir Park Corner
11 November 2006	Aberdeen	Pittodrie, Aberdeen (A)	1–2	10,527	Michael Hart (og)	Fir Park Corner
18 November 2006	Hibernian	Fir Park, Motherwell (H)	1–6	6,190	Steven McGarry	Fir Park Corner
25 November 2006	Falkirk	Fir Park, Motherwell (H)	4–2	4,970	Richie Foran (2 pens.), Scott McDonald, Calum Elliot	Fir Park Corner
2 December 2006	Inverness CT	Caledonian Stadium, Inverness (A)	1–0	3,668	Richie Foran (pen.)	Fir Park Corner
9 December 2006	Hearts	Tynecastle Stadium, Edinburgh (A)	1–4	16,753	Richie Foran	Fir Park Corner
16 December 2006	Dundee United	Fir Park, Motherwell (H)	2–3	4,420	Richie Foran (pen.), Mark Reynolds	Fir Park Corner
23 December 2006	Kilmarnock	Rugby Park, Kilmarnock (A)	2–1	5,576	Richie Foran, Jim Paterson	Fir Park Corner
26 December 2006	Dunfermline	East End Park, Dunfermline (A)	2–0	4,200	Marc Fitzpatrick, Scott McDonald	Fir Park Corner
30 December 2006	Celtic	Fir Park, Motherwell (H)	1–1	9,769	Darren Smith	Fir Park Corner
2 January 2007	Rangers	Fir Park, Motherwell (H)	0–1	10,338		Fir Park Corner
27 January 2007	Hibernian	Easter Road, Edinburgh (A)	0–2	14,280		Fir Park Corner
10 February 2007	Falkirk	Falkirk Stadium, Falkirk (A)	2–1	4,478	Scott McDonald, Darren Smith	Fir Park Corner
17 February 2007	Inverness CT	Fir Park, Motherwell (H)	1–0	4,258	Scott McDonald	Fir Park Corner
20 February 2007	St Mirren	Love Street, Paisley (A)	0–0	3,576		Fir Park Corner
5 March 2007	Hearts	Fir Park, Motherwell (H)	0–2	4,389		Fir Park Corner
10 March 2007	Dundee United	Tannadice, Dundee (A)	1–1	5,183	Danny Murphy	Fir Park Corner
13 March 2007	Aberdeen	Fir Park, Motherwell (H)	0–2	4,530		Fir Park Corner
31 March 2007	Dunfermline	Fir Park, Motherwell (H)	2–0	4,511	Scott McDonald (2)	Fir Park Corner
3 April 2007	Kilmarnock	Fir Park, Motherwell (H)	0–1	3,784		Fir Park Corner
7 April 2007	Celtic	Celtic Park, Glasgow (A)	0–1	58,654		Fir Park Corner
21 April 2007	Inverness CT	Caledonian Stadium, Inverness (A)	0–2	3,804		Fir Park Corner
28 April 2007	Falkirk	Fir Park, Motherwell (H)	3–3	3,640	Darren Smith, Scott McDonald, David Clarkson	Fir Park Corner
7 May 2007	Dunfermline	East End Park, Dunfermline (A)	1–4	6,662	Scott McDonald (pen.)	Fir Park Corner
12 May 2007	St Mirren	Fir Park, Motherwell (H)	2–3	9,277	Ross McCormack (2, 1 pen.)	Fir Park Corner
19 May 2007	Dundee United	Tannadice, Dundee (A)	0–0	6,070		Fir Park Corner

=== Scottish Cup ===
6 January 2007 Third Round	Airdrie	0–1	Motherwell	Airdrie
15:00 GMT		Report	Foran 31'	Stadium: Excelsior Stadium; Attendance: 5,924; Referee: K Clarke

3 February 2007 Fourth Round	Motherwell	2–0	Morton	Motherwell
15:00 GMT	Kerr 10'; McDonald 34'	Report		Stadium: Fir Park; Attendance: 9,394; Referee: J Underhill

28 February 2007 Quarter-finals	Motherwell	1–2	St Johnstone	Motherwell
19:45 GMT	McCormack 85'	Report	MacDonald 21'; Scotland 72'	Stadium: Fir Park; Attendance: 5,788; Referee: M McCurry

=== Scottish League Cup ===
Date	Round	Opponent	H/A	Score	Motherwell Scorer(s)	Attendance	Report
22 August 2006	2nd Round	Partick Thistle	H	3–2	Richie Foran (6, 16) Steven McGarry (88)	3,752	BBC Sport
20 September 2006	3rd Round	Queens Park	A	3–0	Richie Foran (22, 47, 54(pen.))	2,408	BBC Sport
7 November 2006	Quarter-final	Kilmarnock	A	2–3	Richie Foran (25(pen.)), David Clarkson (59)	5,601	BBC Sport

== Statistics ==
As of match played 19 May 2007

=== Appearances ===
No.	Pos	Nat	Player	Total		Premier League		Scottish Cup		League Cup	
No.	Pos	Nat	Player	Apps	Goals	Apps	Goals	Apps	Goals	Apps	Goals
1	GK	(Scotland) SCO	Graeme Smith	28	0	23+1	0	3	0	1	0
2	DF	(Scotland) SCO	Martyn Corrigan	25	0	19+3	0	3	0	0	0
3	DF	(Republic of Ireland) IRL	Danny Murphy	16	1	12+1	1	3	0	0	0
4	MF	(Scotland) SCO	Brian Kerr	41	3	35	2	3	1	3	0
5	DF	(Northern Ireland) NIR	Stephen Craigan	40	0	34	0	3	0	3	0
6	DF	(Northern Ireland) NIR	Brian McLean	4	0	1+3	0	0	0	0	0
7	FW	(Australia) AUS	Scott McDonald	37	16	30+2	15	3	1	2	0
8	FW	(Scotland) SCO	Ross McCormack	15	3	6+6	2	1	1	1+1	0
10	MF	(Scotland) SCO	Phil O'Donnell (c)	3	1	3	1	0	0	0	0
11	DF	(Scotland) SCO	Jim Paterson	38	1	34	1	2	0	2	0
12	FW	(Scotland) SCO	David Clarkson	34	3	19+10	2	2+1	0	1+1	1
13	FW	(Republic of Ireland) IRL	Paul Keegan	10	0	4+4	0	0+2	0	0	0
14	MF	(Scotland) SCO	Steven McGarry	31	2	20+7	1	2+1	0	0+1	1
15	DF	(Scotland) SCO	William Kinniburgh	6	0	4+2	0	0	0	0	0
15	MF	(Republic of Ireland) IRL	Trevor Molloy	8	0	0+6	0	1+1	0	0	0
17	MF	(Scotland) SCO	Kevin McBride	20	0	10+7	0	0	0	1+2	0
18	GK	(Scotland) SCO	Colin Meldrum	18	0	15+1	0	0	0	2	0
19	DF	(Scotland) SCO	Paul Quinn	29	2	24+2	2	0	0	3	0
20	MF	(Scotland) SCO	Marc Fitzpatrick	28	1	13+11	1	2	0	1+1	0
22	MF	(Scotland) SCO	Keith Lasley	17	0	14	0	0	0	3	0
24	DF	(Scotland) SCO	Robert Donnelly	3	0	2	0	0	0	1	0
26	MF	(Scotland) SCO	Kenny Connolly	3	0	1+1	0	0+1	0	0	0
27	FW	(Scotland) SCO	Adam Coakley	3	0	2	0	0	0	1	0
29	MF	(Scotland) SCO	Stephen Maguire	4	0	2	0	0	0	2	0
30	DF	(Scotland) SCO	Mark Reynolds	41	2	35	2	3	0	3	0
31	FW	(Scotland) SCO	Calum Elliot	17	2	10+5	2	0	0	1+1	0
31	MF	(Hungary) HUN	Krisztian Vadocz	11	0	11	0	0	0	0	0
40	FW	(Scotland) SCO	Jamie Murphy	2	0	1+1	0	0	0	0	0
Players away from the club on loan:
Players who left Motherwell during the season:
9	MF	(Republic of Ireland) IRL	Richie Foran	27	14	22+1	7	1	1	3	6
16	FW	(Scotland) SCO	Jim Hamilton	3	0	2+1	0	0	0	0	0

=== Goal scorers ===
Ranking	Position	Nation	Number	Name	Premier League	Scottish Cup	League Cup	Total
1	FW	(Scotland)	7	Scott McDonald	15	1	0	16
2	FW	(Republic of Ireland)	9	Richie Foran	7	1	6	14
3	FW	(Scotland)	12	David Clarkson	2	0	1	3
3	MF	(Scotland)	4	Brian Kerr	2	1	0	3
3	FW	(Scotland)	8	Ross McCormack	2	1	0	3
6	FW	(Scotland)	31	Calum Elliot	2	0	0	2
6	DF	(Scotland)	30	Mark Reynolds	2	0	0	2
6	MF	(Scotland)	14	Steven McGarry	1	0	1	2
6	DF	(Scotland)	19	Paul Quinn	2	0	0	2
10	DF	(Scotland)	20	Marc Fitzpatrick	1	0	0	1
10	DF	(Republic of Ireland)	3	Danny Murphy	1	0	0	1
10	MF	(Scotland)	10	Phil O'Donnell	1	0	0	1
10	DF	(Scotland)	11	Jim Paterson	1	0	0	1
				TOTALS	39	4	8	51

=== Clean sheets ===
Ranking	Position	Nation	Number	Name	Premier League	Scottish Cup	League Cup	Total
1	GK	(Scotland)	15	Graeme Smith	5	0	2	7
2	GK	(Scotland)	18	Colin Meldrum	4	0	0	4
				TOTALS	8	0	2	10

Colin Meldrum & Graeme Smith both played in Motherwell's 0-0 draw with Dundee United on 19 May 2007

=== Disciplinary record ===
Number	Nation	Position	Name	Premier League		Scottish Cup		League Cup		Total	
Number	Nation	Position	Name	Booked	Sent off (straight red)	Booked	Sent off (straight red)	Booked	Sent off (straight red)	Booked	Sent off (straight red)
2	(Scotland)	DF	Martyn Corrigan	4	0	0	0	0	0	4	0
3	(Republic of Ireland)	DF	Danny Murphy	1	0	0	0	1	0	2	0
4	(Scotland)	MF	Brian Kerr	4	0	0	0	0	0	4	0
5	(Northern Ireland)	DF	Stephen Craigan	5	0	1	0	0	0	6	0
6	(Northern Ireland)	DF	Brian McLean	1	0	0	0	0	0	1	0
7	(Australia)	FW	Scott McDonald	8	1	0	0	1	0	9	1
8	(Scotland)	FW	Ross McCormack	1	0	0	0	0	0	1	0
10	(Scotland)	MF	Phil O'Donnell	3	0	0	0	0	0	3	0
11	(Scotland)	DF	Jim Paterson	8	1	0	0	0	0	8	1
12	(Scotland)	FW	David Clarkson	5	1	1	0	0	0	6	1
13	(Republic of Ireland)	FW	Paul Keegan	7	0	1	0	0	0	7	0
14	(Scotland)	MF	Steven McGarry	3	0	0	0	0	0	3	0
15	(Scotland)	DF	Willie Kinniburgh	2	0	0	0	0	0	2	0
15	(Republic of Ireland)	MF	Trevor Molloy	3	0	0	0	0	0	3	0
17	(Scotland)	MF	Kevin McBride	2	1	0	0	0	0	2	1
19	(Scotland)	DF	Paul Quinn	9	1	0	0	0	0	9	1
20	(Scotland)	MF	Marc Fitzpatrick	2	1	0	0	0	0	2	1
23	(Scotland)	FW	Darren Smith	0	0	0	0	1	0	1	0
24	(Scotland)	DF	Robert Donnolly	0	0	1	0	0	0	1	0
27	(Scotland)	FW	Adam Coakley	1	0	0	0	0	0	1	0
30	(Scotland)	DF	Mark Reynolds	0	1	0	0	0	0	0	1
31	(Scotland)	FW	Calum Elliot	1	0	1	0	0	0	2	0
Players who left Motherwell during the season:
9	(Republic of Ireland)	FW	Richie Foran	7	0	0	0	0	0	7	0
			TOTALS	56	6	4	0	3	0	63	6

== See also ==
- List of Motherwell F.C. seasons
