= 2005–06 Motherwell F.C. season =

Motherwell
2005–06 season
- Chairman: John Boyle
- Manager: Terry Butcher
- Premier League: 8th
- Scottish Cup: Third round
- League Cup: Semi-finals
- Top goalscorer: League: Richie Foran; Scott McDonald (11 each); All: Richie Foran (12 goals)
- Highest home attendance: 11,503 vs Celtic; 22 January 2006
- Lowest home attendance: 3,438 vs Inverness C.T. 15 April 2006
- Average home league attendance: 6,250
Home colours	Away colours

The 2005–06 season was Motherwell's 8th season in the Scottish Premier League, and their 21st consecutive season in the top division of Scottish football.

== Season events ==
On 25 June, Motherwell announced the signing of Graeme Smith from Rangers.

On 31 August, Motherwell announced the signing of Steve McDonald from Sorrento on a deal until January, and the signing of Brian McLean on loan from Rangers for the remainder of the season.

On 31 January, Motherwell announced the signing of Abel Thermeus from Créteil-Lusitanos after impressing on trial, whilst Ryan Wilkie who was also on trial with the club left for a trial with Real Betis.

== Squad ==
As of match played 6 May 2006

No.	Name	Nationality	Position	Date of birth (age)	Signed from	Signed in	Contract ends	Apps.	Goals
Goalkeepers
15	Graeme Smith	(Scotland)	GK	8 June 1983 (aged 22)	Rangers	2005		34	0
18	Colin Meldrum	(Scotland)	GK	26 November 1975 (aged 30)	Forfar Athletic	2005		9	0
Defenders
2	Martyn Corrigan	(Scotland)	DF	14 August 1977 (aged 28)	Falkirk	2000		241	6
3	Steven Hammell	(Scotland)	DF	18 February 1982 (aged 24)	Youth team	1999		242	2
5	Stephen Craigan	(Northern Ireland)	DF	29 October 1976 (aged 29)	Partick Thistle	2003		149	9
11	Jim Paterson	(Scotland)	DF	25 September 1979 (aged 26)	Dundee United	2004	2006	59	5
19	Paul Quinn	(Scotland)	DF	21 July 1985 (aged 20)	Youth team	2002		80	0
22	William Kinniburgh	(Scotland)	DF	8 September 1984 (aged 21)	Youth team	2000		57	3
26	John Kane	(Scotland)	DF	8 June 1987 (aged 18)	Hibernian	2005		0	0
27	Bobby Donnelly	(Scotland)	DF	19 January 1987 (aged 19)	Youth team	2003		3	0
30	Mark Quinn	(Scotland)	DF	13 May 1987 (aged 18)	Youth team	2003		0	0
31	John McStay	(Scotland)	DF	10 July 1987 (aged 18)	Celtic	2003		0	0
35	John Grant	(Scotland)	DF	25 August 1987 (aged 18)	Youth team	2004		0	0
36	William Soutar	(Scotland)	DF	12 July 1987 (aged 18)	Youth team	2004		0	0
39	Mark Reynolds	(Scotland)	DF	7 May 1987 (aged 18)	Youth team	2004		1	0
41	Craig Brownlie	(Scotland)	DF	25 May 1988 (aged 17)	Youth team	2005		0	0
43	David Nixon	(Scotland)	DF	9 July 1988 (aged 17)	Youth team	2005		0	0
44	Cameron Murray	(Scotland)	DF	24 April 1989 (aged 17)	Youth team	2005		0	0
47	Brian McLean	(Scotland)	DF	28 February 1985 (aged 21)	on loan from Rangers	2005	2006	34	3
Midfielders
4	Brian Kerr	(Scotland)	MF	12 October 1981 (aged 24)	Newcastle United	2004		49	4
6	Alan McCormack	(Republic of Ireland)	MF	10 January 1984 (aged 22)	on loan from Preston North End	2005	2006	28	2
10	Phil O'Donnell	(Scotland)	MF	25 March 1972 (aged 34)	Sheffield Wednesday	2004		211	24
14	Steven McGarry	(Scotland)	MF	28 September 1979 (aged 26)	Ross County	2006		9	0
17	Kevin McBride	(Scotland)	MF	14 June 1981 (aged 24)	Celtic	2005		53	8
21	Shaun Fagan	(Scotland)	MF	22 March 1984 (aged 22)	Youth team	1999		84	3
24	Marc Fitzpatrick	(Scotland)	MF	11 May 1986 (aged 19)	Youth team	2002		41	3
27	Kenny Connolly	(Scotland)	MF	4 April 1987 (aged 19)	Youth team	2004		0	0
29	Stephen Maguire	(Scotland)	MF	14 February 1987 (aged 19)	Youth team	2003		0	0
37	Darren Smith	(Scotland)	MF	27 March 1988 (aged 18)	Youth team	2004		3	1
39	Alex Donnelly	(Scotland)	MF	22 March 1988 (aged 18)	Youth team	2003		0	0
42	Ross Forbes	(Scotland)	MF	3 March 1989 (aged 17)	Youth team	2005		0	0
Forwards
7	Scott McDonald	(Australia)	FW	21 August 1983 (aged 22)	Wimbledon	2004		88	29
9	Richie Foran	(Republic of Ireland)	FW	16 June 1980 (aged 25)	Carlisle United	2004		78	21
12	David Clarkson	(Scotland)	FW	10 September 1985 (aged 20)	Youth team	2002	2006	139	25
16	Jim Hamilton	(Scotland)	FW	9 February 1976 (aged 30)	Livingston	2005	2007	52	13
20	Kenny Wright	(Scotland)	FW	1 August 1985 (aged 20)	Youth team	2002		26	2
23	Abel Thermeus	(France)	FW	19 January 1983 (aged 23)	Créteil-Lusitanos	2006		2	0
32	Ryan Russell	(Scotland)	FW	9 April 1987 (aged 19)	Youth team	2003		0	0
33	Adam Coakley	(Scotland)	FW	19 October 1987 (aged 18)	Youth team	2003		1	0
45	David Gormley	(Scotland)	FW	10 May 1988 (aged 17)	Youth team	2005		0	0
46	Jamie Murphy	(Scotland)	FW	28 August 1989 (aged 16)	Youth team	2006		0	0
Away on loan
Left during the season
1	Gordon Marshall	(Scotland)	GK	19 April 1964 (aged 42)	Kilmarnock	2003		77	0
8	Scott Leitch	(Scotland)	MF	6 October 1969 (aged 36)	Swindon Town	2000		144	1
13	Steve McDonald	(Australia)	DF	13 December 1979 (aged 26)	Sorrento	2005	2006	1	0
14	Andy Smith	(Northern Ireland)	FW	25 September 1980 (aged 25)	on loan from Preston North End	2005	2005	1	0
32	David Keogh	(Scotland)	DF	29 August 1986 (aged 19)	Youth team	2003		4	0

== Transfers ==
=== In ===
Date	Position	Nationality	Name	From	Fee	Ref.
25 June 2005	GK	(Scotland)	Graeme Smith	Rangers	Undisclosed	
12 August 2005	GK	(Scotland)	Colin Meldrum	Livingston	Undisclosed	
31 August 2005	DF	(Australia)	Steve McDonald	Sorrento	Undisclosed	
27 January 2006	MF	(Scotland)	Steven McGarry	Ross County	Undisclosed	
31 January 2006	FW	(France)	Abel Thermeus	Créteil-Lusitanos	Undisclosed	

=== Loans in ===
Date from	Position	Nationality	Name	From	Date to	Ref.
29 July 2005	MF	(Republic of Ireland)	Alan McCormack	Preston North End	End of season	
5 August 2005	FW	(Northern Ireland)	Andy Smith	Preston North End	25 September 2005	
31 August 2005	DF	(Scotland)	Brian McLean	Rangers	End of season	

=== Out ===
Date	Position	Nationality	Name	To	Fee	Ref.
25 July 2005	DF	(Wales)	David Partridge	Bristol City	£150,000	
	GK	(Scotland)	Barry John Corr	Stranraer		
	GK	(Scotland)	Jamie Ewings	Albion Rovers		
	DF	(Scotland)	Chris Higgins	Clyde		
January 2006	DF	(Australia)	Steve McDonald	Sengwang Punggol		

=== Released ===
Date	Position	Nationality	Name	Joined	Date	Ref.
9 November 2005	GK	(Scotland)	Gordon Marshall	Hibernian as Coach	9 November 2005	
January 2006	FW	(Scotland)	David Keogh			
May 2006	DF	(Scotland)	Steven Hammell	Southend United	30 June 2006	
May 2006	MF	(Scotland)	Scott Leitch	Retired		
May 2006	FW	(Scotland)	Kenny Wright	Stranraer	25 July 2006	

== Competitions ==
=== Overview ===
Competition	First match	Last match	Starting round	Final position	Record							
Competition	First match	Last match	Starting round	Final position	Pld	W	D	L	GF	GA	GD	Win %
Premier League	30 July 2005	6 May 2006	Matchday 1	8th	38	13	10	15	55	61	−6	34.21
Scottish Cup	7 January 2006	7 January 2006	Third Round	Third Round	1	0	0	1	0	3	−3	0.00
League Cup	23 August 2005	1 February 2006	Second Round	Semi-final	4	3	0	1	6	3	+3	75.00
Total					43	16	10	17	61	67	−6	37.21

Last updated: 6 May 2006
Source: Competitions

=== Premier League ===
==== Classification ====
Pos	Team	Pld	W	D	L	GF	GA	GD	Pts	Qualification or relegation (Note: Teams played each other three times (33 matches), before the league split into two groups (the top six and the bottom six) for the last five matches.)
6	Aberdeen	38	13	15	10	46	40	+6	54	
7	Inverness Caledonian Thistle	38	15	13	10	51	38	+13	58	
8	Motherwell	38	13	10	15	55	61	−6	49	
9	Dundee United	38	7	12	19	41	66	−25	33	
10	Falkirk	38	8	9	21	35	64	−29	33	

Source: Scottish Professional Football League
Rules for classification: 1) Points; 2) Goal difference; 3) Goals scored

==== Results summary ====
Overall								Home						Away					
Pld	W	D	L	GF	GA	GD	Pts	W	D	L	GF	GA	GD	W	D	L	GF	GA	GD
38	13	10	15	55	61	−6	49	7	5	7	35	31	+4	6	5	8	20	30	−10

Source: Fir Park Corner

==== Results by round ====
Round	1	2	3	4	5	6	7	8	9	10	11	12	13	14	15	16	17	18	19	20	21	22	23	24	25	26	27	28	29	30	31	32	33	34	35	36	37	38
Ground	H	H	A	H	A	A	H	H	A	H	A	A	A	H	A	H	H	A	A	H	A	H	H	A	A	H	A	A	H	H	A	H	A	H	A	H	A	H
Result	D	W	L	L	L	W	W	L	D	W	L	L	W	D	D	D	L	W	L	W	W	L	L	D	L	W	L	W	W	D	D	W	L	L	D	L	W	D
Position	7	3	7	8	9	8	6	7	7	6	6	7	6	6	6	7	8	7	8	7	6	7	7	7	8	8	8	8	7	8	8	7	7	8	8	8	8	8

Source: Fir Park Corner
A = Away; H = Home; W = Win; D = Draw; L = Loss

==== Results ====
30 July 2005 1	Motherwell	4-4	Celtic	Motherwell
12:30 BST (UTC+1)	Kerr 20'; Hammell (yellow card) 35'; McDonald (yellow card) 45' (goal) 60'; Hamilton 58'; Kinniburgh 84'	Report	Hartson 14', 32', 44' (pen.); Varga (yellow card) 37'; McManus (yellow card) 45'; Beattie 90+1'	Stadium: Fir Park; Attendance: 9,903; Referee: Mike McCurry

6 August 2005 2	Motherwell	1-0	Dunfermline Athletic	Motherwell
15:00 BST (UTC+1)	McCormack (yellow card) 73'; Hamilton 90'	Report	Wilson (red card) 24'; Young (yellow card) 56'	Stadium: Fir Park; Attendance: 4,649; Referee: Steve Conroy

13 August 2005 3	Kilmarnock	4–1	Motherwell	Kilmarnock
15:00 BST (UTC+1)	Johnston 12'; Boyd 19', 73'; McDonald 61'	Report	Kerr (yellow card) 32'; Clarkson 42'; McCormack (yellow card) 47'; Kinniburgh (yellow card) 52'	Stadium: Rugby Park; Attendance: 5,035; Referee: Dougie McDonald

20 August 2005 4	Motherwell	4–5	Dundee United	Motherwell
15:00 BST (UTC+1)	McCormack 6'; McDonald 12'; Fitzpatrick 49'; Hamilton 57'; Quinn (yellow card) 84'; Kerr (yellow card) 89'	Report	Miller 42', 67'; Fernandez 53'; McCracken (yellow card) 56'; Brebner (yellow card) 65' (goal) 71', 74'	Stadium: Fir Park; Attendance: 4,706; Referee: Mike Ritchie

27 August 2005 5	Heart of Midlothian	2–1	Motherwell	Edinburgh
15:00 BST (UTC+1)	Skácel 40'; Jankauskas 70'	Report	Foran 76' (pen.); Hammell (yellow card) 77'	Stadium: Tynecastle Park; Attendance: 16,213; Referee: Craig Thomson

10 September 2005 6	Inverness Caledonian Thistle	1–2	Motherwell	Inverness
15:00 BST (UTC+1)	Brewster 25'; Fox (yellow card) 32'; Dods (yellow card) 47'	Report	McDonald 66'; Kinniburgh 70'; Paterson (yellow card) 87'	Stadium: Caledonian Stadium; Attendance: 4,018; Referee: Ian Fife

17 September 2005 7	Motherwell	5–0	Falkirk	Motherwell
15:00 BST (UTC+1)	Hamilton 32'; Foran 42', 46'; Fagan 58'; McDonald 64'	Report	Scally (yellow card) 37'; Milne (yellow card) 85'	Stadium: Fir Park; Attendance: 5,625; Referee: John Underhill

24 September 2005 8	Motherwell	1–3	Hibernian	Motherwell
15:00 BST (UTC+1)	McLean (yellow card) 2'; Foran (yellow card) 14' (goal) 83' (pen.); Fagan (yellow card) 42'; Hammell (yellow card) 77'	Report	Sproule (yellow card) 11'; Beuzelin 20'; Stewart 68'; Riordan 80'; Małkowski (yellow card) 82'	Stadium: Fir Park; Attendance: 6,461; Referee: Dougie McDonald

1 October 2005 9	Aberdeen	2–2	Motherwell	Aberdeen
15:00 BST (UTC+1)	Lovell (yellow card) 18'; Mackie (yellow card) 74' (goal) 79' (pen.), 85'; Byrne (red card) 77'	Report	Clarkson 63', 69'	Stadium: Pittodrie Stadium; Attendance: 11,448; Referee: Craig Thomson

15 October 2005 10	Motherwell	1–0	Livingston	Motherwell
15:00 BST (UTC+1)	Foran 21'; Fagan (yellow card) 38'	Report		Stadium: Fir Park; Attendance: 4,507

22 October 2005 11	Rangers	2–0	Motherwell	Glasgow
15:00 BST (UTC+1)	Burke 1'; Løvenkrands 72'	Report		Stadium: Ibrox Stadium; Attendance: 49,215; Referee: Steve Conroy

26 October 2005 12	Celtic	5-0	Motherwell	Glasgow
19:45 BST (UTC+1)	Petrov 14', 23', 79'; Maloney 17'; Nakamura 67'	Report	Fagan (yellow card) 45'; Kinniburgh (yellow card) 56'; Quinn (yellow card) 79'; Craigan (yellow card) 84'	Stadium: Celtic Park; Attendance: 57,388; Referee: Charlie Richmond

29 October 2005 13	Dunfermline Athletic	0-3	Motherwell	Dunfermline
15:00 GMT (UTC)		Report	Kerr 57'; Corrigan 62'; Hamilton 80'	Stadium: East End Park; Attendance: 4,421; Referee: Mike McCurry

5 November 2005 14	Motherwell	2-2	Kilmarnock	Motherwell
15:00 GMT (UTC)	McDonald 24'; Kerr 54'; Fagan (yellow card) 78'	Report	Boyd 9', 90'; Dodds (yellow card) 25'; Ford (yellow card) 54'; Invincibile (yellow card) 90'	Stadium: Fir Park; Attendance: 4,979; Referee: Kenny Clark

19 November 2005 15	Dundee United	1-1	Motherwell	Dundee
15:00 GMT (UTC)	Ritchie (yellow card) 16' (red card) 90'; Robson (yellow card) 59'; McIntyre 68'	Report	McCormack (yellow card) 56'; McDonald 71'	Stadium: Tannadice Stadium; Attendance: 6,305; Referee: Mike McCurry

26 November 2005 16	Motherwell	1-1	Heart of Midlothian	Motherwell
15:00 GMT (UTC)	Corrigan (yellow card) 36'; Hamilton (yellow card) 37'; McLean 40' (yellow card) 57'; McCormack (yellow card) 71'	Report	Elliot (yellow card) 38'; Skácel (yellow card) 53'; Neilson (yellow card) 68'; Hartley 90+1' (pen.) (yellow card) 90+1'	Stadium: Fir Park; Attendance: 8,131; Referee: Iain Brines

3 December 2005 17	Motherwell	0–2	Inverness Caledonian Thistle	Motherwell
15:00 GMT (UTC)		Report	Dargo 63', 88'	Stadium: Fir Park; Attendance: 4,103; Referee: Steve Conroy

10 December 2005 18	Falkirk	0–1	Motherwell	Falkirk
15:00 GMT (UTC)	Gow (yellow card) 25'; Jonas (yellow card) 87'	Report	McLean (yellow card) 32'; Corrigan (yellow card) 42'; Hammell (yellow card) 46'; Hamilton 59'; McCormack (yellow card) 75'	Stadium: Falkirk Stadium; Attendance: 4,972; Referee: Mike Ritchie

17 December 2005 19	Hibernian	2–1	Motherwell	Edinburgh
15:00 GMT (UTC)	Fletcher 3'; Beuzelin (yellow card) 19'; Brown (yellow card) 55'; Riordan 90'; Sproule (yellow card) 90'	Report	McDonald 17' (yellow card) 77'; Corrigan (yellow card) 39'; McCormack (yellow card) 55'; Hamilton (yellow card) 61'; McBride (yellow card) 69'; Quinn (yellow card) 75'; Kerr (yellow card) 80'	Stadium: Easter Road; Attendance: 11,926; Referee: Charlie Richmond

26 December 2005 20	Motherwell	3–1	Aberdeen	Motherwell
15:00 GMT (UTC)	McDonald 9', 26'; McCormack 53'	Report	Stewart 90+2'	Stadium: Fir Park; Attendance: 6,555; Referee: Calum Murray

31 December 2005 21	Livingston	1–2	Motherwell	Livingston
14:00 GMT (UTC)	Pinxten 37'; Scott (yellow card) 83'	Report	Foran 30'; McBride 90'	Stadium: Almondvale Stadium; Attendance: 4,431; Referee: Craig MacKay

15 January 2006 22	Motherwell	0–1	Rangers	Motherwell
14:00 GMT (UTC)	Hammell (yellow card) 81'; McBride (yellow card) 84'	Report	Løvenkrands 55'; Buffel (yellow card) 62'; Smith (yellow card) 78'; Malcolm (yellow card) 85'; Boyd (yellow card) 90+2'	Stadium: Fir Park; Attendance: 10,689

22 January 2006 23	Motherwell	1-3	Celtic	Motherwell
14:00 GMT (UTC)	Hamilton 41' (yellow card) 80'; McCormack (yellow card) 50'; Foran (yellow card) 65'	Report	Żurawski 17'; McGeady 71'; Hartson 85'	Stadium: Fir Park; Attendance: 11,503; Referee: Charlie Richmond

28 January 2006 24	Dunfermline Athletic	1-1	Motherwell	Dunfermline
15:00 GMT (UTC)	Young 11'	Report	Hamilton 52'; Hammell (yellow card) 75'	Stadium: East End Park; Attendance: 4,961; Referee: Kenny Clark

8 February 2006 25	Kilmarnock	2–0	Motherwell	Kilmarnock
19:45 GMT (UTC)	Wales 34', 51'	Report	Craigan (yellow card) 26'; Thermeus (red card) 83'	Stadium: Rugby Park; Attendance: 5,169; Referee: Stuart Dougal

11 February 2006 26	Motherwell	2-0	Dundee United	Motherwell
15:00 GMT (UTC)	Foran 27', 57'; McCormack (yellow card) 54'; Hammell (yellow card) 73'	Report	Mulgrew (yellow card) 60'; McCracken (yellow card) 76'	Stadium: Fir Park; Attendance: 5,257; Referee: Alan Freeland

18 February 2006 27	Heart of Midlothian	3-0	Motherwell	Edinburgh
15:00 GMT (UTC)	Jankauskas 4', 14'; Česnauskis (yellow card) 39'; Elliot 78' (yellow card) 81'	Report	Hamilton (yellow card) 35'; Kerr (yellow card) 37'; Foran (yellow card) 77'	Stadium: Tynecastle Park; Attendance: 16,976; Referee: Charlie Richmond

4 March 2006 28	Inverness Caledonian Thistle	0–1	Motherwell	Inverness
15:00 GMT (UTC)	Morgan (yellow card) 46'; Tokely (yellow card) 51'; Black (yellow card) 60'	Report	Foran 51' (pen.)	Stadium: Caledonian Stadium; Attendance: 3,183; Referee: Steve Conroy

11 March 2006 29	Motherwell	3–1	Falkirk	Motherwell
15:00 GMT (UTC)	McDonald 31', 46'; McBride (yellow card) 48'; Foran 53'; McCormack (yellow card) 62'	Report	McBreen (yellow card) 51'; Cregg 55'; Thomson (yellow card) 64'; Milne (yellow card) 82'	Stadium: Fir Park; Attendance: 5,625; Referee: John Underhill

18 March 2006 30	Motherwell	2–2	Hibernian	Motherwell
15:00 GMT (UTC)	O'Donnell 40'; Craigan 90+1'	Report	Killen 48'; Sproule (yellow card) 68'; Glass 78'	Stadium: Fir Park; Attendance: 6,724; Referee: Mike McCurry

25 March 2005 31	Aberdeen	2–2	Motherwell	Aberdeen
15:00 BST (UTC+1)	Lovell 14', 22' (yellow card) 52'	Report	Hammell (yellow card) 40'; McLean 45+3'; Foran 49' (pen.); Craigan (yellow card) 64'; McDonald (yellow card) 77'	Stadium: Pittodrie Stadium; Attendance: 10,212; Referee: Calum Murray

1 April 2006 32	Motherwell	2–1	Livingston	Motherwell
15:00 BST (UTC+1)	Hamilton 40'; McLean 90'	Report	Whelan (yellow card) 59' (goal) 76'; McKenzie (yellow card) 90+3'	Stadium: Fir Park; Attendance: 4,458; Referee: Eddie Smith

8 April 2006 33	Rangers	2–0	Motherwell	Glasgow
15:00 BST (UTC+1)	Boyd 27'	Report	McCormack (yellow card) 43'; Foran (yellow card) 90'	Stadium: Ibrox Stadium; Attendance: 49,481; Referee: Kenny Clark

15 April 2006 34	Motherwell	0–1	Inverness Caledonian Thistle	Motherwell
15:00 BST (UTC+1)	McCormack (yellow card) 51' (red card) 52'; Kinniburgh (yellow card) 87'	Report	Dargo 27'; Duncan (yellow card) 51'; Keogh (yellow card) 61'; Bayne (yellow card) 76'	Stadium: Fir Park; Attendance: 3,438; Referee: Dougie McDonald

22 April 2006 35	Falkirk	1–1	Motherwell	Falkirk
15:00 BST (UTC+1)	Gow 16'; Thomson (yellow card) 22'; Cregg (yellow card) 39'; Dodds (yellow card) 40'; Craig (yellow card) 86'	Report	Hammell (yellow card) 39'; O'Donnell 58'; Foran (yellow card) 40'; Craigan (yellow card) 66'	Stadium: Falkirk Stadium; Attendance: 4,467; Referee: Mike McCurry

29 April 2006 36	Motherwell	2-3	Dunfermline Athletic	Motherwell
15:00 BST (UTC+1)	Paterson 7'; Craigan 65'	Report	Campbell 21'; Burchill 30' (pen.); Mason 50'; Wilson (yellow card) 67'; McGregor (yellow card) 82'	Stadium: Fir Park; Attendance: 3,621; Referee: Charlie Richmond

3 May 2006 37	Livingston	0–1	Motherwell	Livingston
19:45 BST (UTC+1)	Scott (yellow card) 7'	Report	Clarkson 74'	Stadium: Almondvale Stadium; Attendance: 2,283; Referee: Iain Brines

6 May 2006 38	Motherwell	1–1	Dundee United	Motherwell
15:00 BST (UTC+1)	Hamilton 60'; McBride (yellow card) 86'; Quinn (yellow card) 86'	Report	Duff (yellow card) 69'; Samuel 86'	Stadium: Fir Park; Attendance: 5,269; Referee: Stuart Dougal

=== Scottish Cup ===
7 January 2006 Third Round	St Mirren	3-0	Motherwell	Paisley
15:00 GMT (UTC)	Adam 22', 90+2'; Potter 74'	Report	Foran (yellow card) 45+1'	Stadium: Love Street; Attendance: 6,507; Referee: Mike McCurry

=== League Cup ===
23 August 2005 Second round	Motherwell	2-1	Hamilton Academical	Motherwell
19:45 BST (UTC+1)	McDonald 41' (pen.); McCormack (yellow card) 67'; Hamilton 89'	Report	Ferguson (yellow card) 41'; Hardy (red card) 69'	Stadium: Fir Park; Attendance: 4,619; Referee: Mike McCurry

20 September 2005 Third Round	St Mirren	0-2 (a.e.t.)	Motherwell	Paisley
19:45 BST (UTC+1)	McGowne (yellow card) 21'; Broadfoot (yellow card) 76'	Report	Quinn (yellow card) 31'; McDonald (yellow card) 57'; Fagan (yellow card) 92'; Clarkson 97'; D.Smith 104'	Stadium: Love Street; Attendance: 3,810; Referee: Iain Brines

8 November 2005 Quarter-final	Motherwell	1-0	Aberdeen	Motherwell
19:45 GMT (UTC)	Kerr 5' (yellow card) 75'; G.Smith (yellow card) 7'	Report	Diamond (red card) 74'; Anderson (yellow card) 78'; Mackie (yellow card) 87'; Langfield (yellow card) 90+5'	Stadium: Fir Park; Attendance: 3,989; Referee: Dougie McDonald

1 February 2006 Semi-final	Motherwell	1-2	Celtic	Glasgow
19:45 GMT (UTC)	Foran 11'; Craigan (yellow card) 82'	Report	Żurawski 29'; Hartson (yellow card) 79'; Maloney 88'	Stadium: Hampden Park; Attendance: 32,595; Referee: Craig Thomson

== Statistics ==
As of match played 6 May 2006

=== Appearances ===
No.	Pos	Nat	Player	Total		Premier League		Scottish Cup		League Cup	
No.	Pos	Nat	Player	Apps	Goals	Apps	Goals	Apps	Goals	Apps	Goals
2	DF	(Scotland) SCO	Martyn Corrigan	32	1	27+2	1	1	0	1+1	0
3	DF	(Scotland) SCO	Steven Hammell	38	0	32+1	0	1	0	4	0
4	MF	(Scotland) SCO	Brian Kerr	41	4	32+4	3	1	0	4	1
5	DF	(Northern Ireland) NIR	Stephen Craigan	39	2	36	2	0	0	3	0
6	MF	(Republic of Ireland) IRL	Alan McCormack	28	2	24	2	1	0	3	0
7	FW	(Australia) AUS	Scott McDonald	38	12	30+4	11	0	0	4	1
9	FW	(Republic of Ireland) IRL	Richie Foran	37	12	29+3	11	1	0	3+1	1
10	MF	(Scotland) SCO	Phil O'Donnell	32	2	23+6	2	1	0	1+1	0
11	DF	(Scotland) SCO	Jim Paterson	19	1	10+9	1	0	0	0	0
12	FW	(Scotland) SCO	David Clarkson	33	5	12+18	4	0+1	0	1+1	1
14	MF	(Scotland) SCO	Steven McGarry	9	0	2+7	0	0	0	0	0
15	GK	(Scotland) SCO	Graeme Smith	34	0	30	0	1	0	3	0
16	FW	(Scotland) SCO	Jim Hamilton	38	11	30+4	10	1	0	3	1
17	MF	(Scotland) SCO	Kevin McBride	23	1	15+6	1	1	0	1	0
18	GK	(Scotland) SCO	Colin Meldrum	9	0	7+1	0	0	0	1	0
19	DF	(Scotland) SCO	Paul Quinn	21	0	15+3	0	0	0	3	0
20	FW	(Scotland) SCO	Kenny Wright	1	0	0+1	0	0	0	0	0
21	MF	(Scotland) SCO	Shaun Fagan	19	1	11+5	1	0	0	3	0
22	DF	(Scotland) SCO	William Kinniburgh	23	2	17+4	2	0+1	0	1	0
23	FW	(France) FRA	Abel Thermeus	2	0	0+1	0	0	0	0+1	0
24	MF	(Scotland) SCO	Marc Fitzpatrick	10	1	1+8	1	0	0	0+1	0
27	DF	(Scotland) SCO	Bobby Donnelly	3	0	1+1	0	0	0	1	0
33	FW	(Scotland) SCO	Adam Coakley	1	0	0+1	0	0	0	0	0
37	MF	(Scotland) SCO	Darren Smith	2	1	0+1	0	0	0	0+1	1
39	DF	(Scotland) SCO	Mark Reynolds	1	0	1	0	0	0	0	0
47	DF	(Northern Ireland) NIR	Brian McLean	34	3	27+3	3	1	0	2+1	0
Players who appeared for Motherwell but left during the season:
1	GK	(Scotland) SCO	Gordon Marshall	1	0	1	0	0	0	0	0
8	MF	(Scotland) SCO	Scott Leitch	1	0	1	0	0	0	0	0
13	FW	(Australia) AUS	Steve McDonald	1	0	0+1	0	0	0	0	0
14	FW	(Northern Ireland) NIR	Andy Smith	7	0	3+4	0	0	0	0	0
23	FW	(Scotland) SCO	David Keogh	3	0	0+1	0	0	0	0+2	0

=== Goal scorers ===
Ranking	Position	Nation	Number	Name	Premier League	Scottish Cup	League Cup	Total
1	FW	(Republic of Ireland)	9	Richie Foran	11	0	1	12
1	FW	(Scotland)	7	Scott McDonald	11	0	1	12
3	FW	(Scotland)	16	Jim Hamilton	10	0	1	11
4	FW	(Scotland)	12	David Clarkson	4	0	1	5
5	DF	(Northern Ireland)	47	Brian McLean	3	0	0	3
5	MF	(Scotland)	4	Brian Kerr	2	0	1	3
7	DF	(Northern Ireland)	2	Stephen Craigan	2	0	0	2
7	DF	(Scotland)	22	Willie Kinniburgh	2	0	0	2
7	MF	(Republic of Ireland)	6	Alan McCormack	2	0	0	2
7	MF	(Scotland)	10	Phil O'Donnell	2	0	0	2
11	DF	(Scotland)	2	Martyn Corrigan	1	0	0	1
11	MF	(Scotland)	21	Shaun Fagan	1	0	0	1
11	DF	(Scotland)	24	Marc Fitzpatrick	1	0	0	1
11	MF	(Scotland)	17	Kevin McBride	1	0	0	1
11	FW	(Scotland)	37	Darren Smith	0	0	1	1
				TOTALS	55	0	6	61

=== Clean sheets ===
Ranking	Position	Nation	Number	Name	Premier League	Scottish Cup	League Cup	Total
1	GK	(Scotland)	15	Graeme Smith	7	0	2	9
2	GK	(Scotland)	18	Colin Meldrum	1	0	0	1
				TOTALS	8	0	2	10

=== Disciplinary record ===
Nation	Position	Number	Name	Premier League		Scottish Cup		League Cup		Total	
Nation	Position	Number	Name	Booked	Sent off (straight red)	Booked	Sent off (straight red)	Booked	Sent off (straight red)	Booked	Sent off (straight red)
(Scotland)	DF	2	Martyn Corrigan	3	0	0	0	0	0	3	0
(Scotland)	DF	3	Steven Hammell	9	0	0	0	0	0	9	0
(Scotland)	MF	4	Brian Kerr	4	0	0	0	1	0	5	0
(Northern Ireland)	DF	5	Stephen Craigan	5	0	0	0	1	0	6	0
(Republic of Ireland)	MF	6	Alan McCormack	11	1	0	0	1	0	12	1
(Australia)	FW	7	Scott McDonald	1	0	0	0	1	0	2	0
(Republic of Ireland)	FW	9	Richie Foran	5	0	1	0	0	0	6	0
(Scotland)	MF	10	Phil O'Donnell	0	0	0	0	0	0	3	0
(Scotland)	DF	11	Jim Paterson	1	0	0	0	0	0	1	0
(Scotland)	FW	12	David Clarkson	0	0	0	0	0	0	6	1
(Scotland)	MF	14	Steven McGarry	0	0	0	0	0	0	3	0
(Scotland)	GK	15	Graeme Smith	0	0	0	0	1	0	1	0
(Scotland)	FW	16	Jim Hamilton	4	0	0	0	0	0	4	0
(Scotland)	MF	17	Kevin McBride	4	0	0	0	0	0	4	0
(Scotland)	DF	19	Paul Quinn	4	0	0	0	1	0	5	0
(Scotland)	FW	20	Kenny Wright	0	0	0	0	0	0	2	1
(Scotland)	MF	21	Shaun Fagan	4	0	0	0	1	0	5	0
(Scotland)	DF	22	William Kinniburgh	3	0	0	0	0	0	3	0
(France)	FW	23	Abel Thermeus	0	1	0	0	0	0	0	1
(Scotland)	MF	24	Marc Fitzpatrick	0	0	0	0	0	0	2	1
(Scotland)	DF	27	Robert Donnolly	0	0	1	0	0	0	1	0
(Scotland)	FW	33	Adam Coakley	1	0	0	0	0	0	1	0
(Scotland)	FW	37	Darren Smith	0	0	0	0	0	0	1	0
(Scotland)	DF	39	Mark Reynolds	0	0	0	0	0	0	0	1
(Northern Ireland)	DF	47	Brian McLean	3	0	0	0	0	0	3	0
Players who left Motherwell during the season:
(Northern Ireland)	FW	14	Andy Smith	0	0	0	0	0	0	3	0
			TOTALS	62	2	1	0	7	0	70	2

== See also ==
- List of Motherwell F.C. seasons
