= 2007–08 Motherwell F.C. season =

Motherwell
2007–08 season
- Chairman: John Boyle
- Manager: Mark McGhee
- Premier League: 3rd
- Scottish Cup: Fifth Round
- League Cup: Quarter-finals
- Top goalscorer: Chris Porter (18)
- Highest home attendance: 10,445 vs Rangers (17 May 2008)
- Lowest home attendance: 3,571 vs Raith Rovers (29 August 2007)
- Average home league attendance: 6,599
Home colours	Away colours

The 2007–08 season was Motherwell's 10th season in the Scottish Premier League, and their 23rd consecutive season in the top division of Scottish football. Because of finishing 3rd in the SPL, the club managed to qualify for Europe in the UEFA Cup, their first season in Europe for 13 years.

== Important events ==
- 18 June 2007 – Motherwell name Mark McGhee as their new manager, replacing Maurice Malpas, who was sacked at the end of the previous season.
- 4 August 2007 – The first Scottish Premier League fixture of the season (against St Mirren) ends in a 1–0 win at Love Street.
- 25 August 2007 – Motherwell play at Fir Park as the away team for the first time in their history, in a match with Gretna, who are groundsharing for the season. Motherwell win the match 2–1
- 29 August 2007 – The first League Cup fixture of the season against Raith Rovers ends in a 3–1 win at Fir Park. Motherwell advance to the Third Round.
- 31 October 2007 – Motherwell are eliminated from the League Cup against Rangers, ending in a 2–1 defeat at Fir Park
- 29 December 2007 – Captain Phil O'Donnell dies after collapsing on the pitch during Motherwell's 5–3 win over Dundee United. A post mortem reveals left ventricular failure of the heart. Motherwell's next two games (against Hibernian and Celtic) are postponed as a mark of respect. Players wear O'Donnell's signature on their shirts for the rest of the season.
- 4 January 2008 – The funeral of Phil O'Donnell is held at St. Mary's Church, Hamilton.
- 12 January 2008 – The first Scottish Cup fixture of the season against Hearts (also the first match Motherwell play since O'Donnell's death) ends in a 2–2 draw at Tynecastle. Motherwell win the replay 1–0. The club advance to the Fifth Round.
- 4 February 2008 – Motherwell are eliminated from the Scottish Cup after a 2–1 defeat to Dundee at Fir Park.
- 10 May 2008 – Motherwell beat Aberdeen 2–1 to all but seal their place in next seasons UEFA Cup. Hibernian's 2–0 defeat to Celtic confirms Motherwell's place in Europe for the first time in 13 years.
- 22 May 2008 – The final Scottish Premier League fixture of the season against Hibernian ends in a 2–0 win at Easter Road.

== Squad ==
As of match played 22 May 2008

No.	Name	Nationality	Position	Date of birth (age)	Signed from	Signed in	Contract ends	Apps.	Goals
Goalkeepers
1	Graeme Smith	(Scotland)	GK	8 June 1983 (aged 24)	Rangers	2005		104	0
15	Luke Daniels	(Scotland)	GK	5 January 1988 (aged 20)	on loan from West Bromwich Albion	2008	2008	2	0
20	Colin Meldrum	(Scotland)	GK	26 November 1975 (aged 32)	Forfar Athletic	2005	2008	27	0
Defenders
2	Martyn Corrigan	(Scotland)	DF	14 August 1977 (aged 30)	Falkirk	2000		267	6
3	Steven Hammell	(Scotland)	DF	18 February 1982 (aged 26)	Southend United	2008	2010	258	2
4	Mark Reynolds	(Scotland)	DF	7 May 1987 (aged 21)	Youth team	2004	2010	86	2
5	Stephen Craigan	(Northern Ireland)	DF	29 October 1976 (aged 31)	Partick Thistle	2003		232	9
6	Brian McLean	(Northern Ireland)	DF	28 February 1985 (aged 23)	Rangers	2006	2009	49	4
22	Paul Quinn	(Scotland)	DF	21 July 1985 (aged 22)	Youth team	2002		144	5
Midfielders
7	Stephen Hughes	(Scotland)	MF	14 November 1982 (aged 25)	Leicester City	2007	2009	35	1
8	Simon Lappin	(Scotland)	MF	25 January 1983 (aged 25)	on loan from Norwich City	2008	2008	15	2
14	Keith Lasley	(Scotland)	MF	21 September 1979 (aged 28)	Unattached	2006	2008	164	12
16	Marc Fitzpatrick	(Scotland)	MF	11 May 1986 (aged 22)	Youth team	2002	2010	104	4
17	Bob Malcolm	(Scotland)	MF	12 November 1980 (aged 27)	Unattached	2008	2008	8	0
18	Steven McGarry	(Scotland)	MF	28 September 1979 (aged 28)	Ross County	2006	2010	74	4
23	Darren Smith	(Scotland)	MF	27 March 1988 (aged 20)	Youth team	2004		49	8
26	Kenny Connolly	(Scotland)	MF	4 April 1987 (aged 21)	Youth team	2004		3	0
27	Stephen Maguire	(Scotland)	MF	14 February 1987 (aged 21)	Youth team	2004		5	0
30	Paul Slane	(Scotland)	MF	25 November 1991 (aged 16)	Youth team	2007		0	0
Forwards
9	Chris Porter	(England)	FW	12 December 1983 (aged 24)	Unattached	2007	2009	42	18
11	Ross McCormack	(Scotland)	FW	18 August 1986 (aged 21)	Rangers	2006	2008	57	14
12	David Clarkson	(Scotland)	FW	10 September 1985 (aged 22)	Youth team	2002	2010	214	41
32	Jamie Murphy	(Scotland)	FW	28 August 1989 (aged 18)	Youth team	2006		19	1
33	Mark Archdeacon	(Scotland)	FW	9 October 1989 (aged 18)	Youth team	2007		0	0
44	Bob McHugh	(Scotland)	FW	16 July 1991 (aged 16)	Youth team	2007		1	0
Away on loan
24	Martin Grehan	(Scotland)	FW	9 October 1984 (aged 23)	Dundonald Bluebell	2008		1	0
Left during the season
3	Jim Paterson	(Scotland)	DF	25 September 1979 (aged 28)	Dundee United	2004	2008	122	6
8	Simon Mensing	(Germany)	MF	27 June 1982 (aged 25)	Unattached	2007	2009	4	0
10	Phil O'Donnell	(Scotland)	MF	25 March 1972 (aged 36)	Sheffield Wednesday	2004	2008	233	27
15	Lewis Grabban	(England)	FW	12 January 1988 (aged 20)	on loan from Crystal Palace	2007	2008	6	0
17	Willie Kinniburgh	(Scotland)	DF	8 September 1984 (aged 23)	Youth team	2000		65	3
21	Danny Murphy	(Republic of Ireland)	DF	4 December 1982 (aged 25)	Cork City	2007	2009	18	1

== Transfers ==
=== In ===
Date	Position	Nationality	Name	From	Fee	Ref.
19 June 2007	MF	(Germany)	Simon Mensing	Unattached	Free	
3 July 2007	FW	(England)	Chris Porter	Unattached	Free	
31 August 2007	MF	(Scotland)	Stephen Hughes	Leicester City	Undisclosed	
31 January 2008	DF	(Scotland)	Steven Hammell	Southend	£110,000	
26 February 2008	DF	(Scotland)	Bob Malcolm	Unattached	Free	

=== Loans in ===
Date from	Position	Nationality	Name	From	Date to	Ref.
31 August 2007	FW	(England)	Lewis Grabban	Crystal Palace	January 2028	
31 January 2008	MF	(Scotland)	Simon Lappin	Norwich City	31 May 2008	
31 January 2008	GK	(England)	Luke Daniels	West Brom	31 May 2008	

=== Out ===
Date	Position	Nationality	Name	To	Fee	Ref.
24 May 2007	MF	(Scotland)	Kevin McBride	Darlington	Free	
1 July 2007	FW	(Australia)	Scott McDonald	Celtic	£700,000	
17 August 2007	DF	(Republic of Ireland)	Paul Keegan	Partick Thistle	Undisclosed	
1 September 2007	GK	(Scotland)	Alan Martin	Leed United	Undisclosed	
4 January 2008	DF	(Scotland)	Martyn Corrigan	Kilmarnock	Free	
18 January 2008	MF	(Germany)	Simon Mensing	Hamilton Academical	Undisclosed	
19 January 2008	DF	(Scotland)	Willie Kinniburgh	Partick Thistle	Undisclosed	
19 January 2008	DF	(Scotland)	Jim Paterson	Plymouth	Undisclosed	

=== Loans out ===
Date from	Position	Nationality	Name	To	Date to	Ref.
5 October 2007	DF	(Scotland)	Martyn Corrigan	Dundee	5 November 2007	
19 October 2007	DF	(Scotland)	David Nixon	Queen of the South	3 Months	
2 November 2007	DF	(Republic of Ireland)	Danny Murphy	Dunfermline	3 Months	
29 November 2007	DF	(Scotland)	Willie Kinniburgh	Partick Thistle	January 2008	
29 November 2007	MF	(Germany)	Simon Mensing	Hamilton Academical	January 2008	
20 February 2008	FW	(Scotland)	Martin Grehan	Forfar	31 May 2008	

=== Released ===
Date	Position	Nationality	Name	Joined	Date	Ref.
29 December 2007	MF	(Scotland)	Phil O'Donnell	His death		

=== Trial ===
Date from	Position	Nationality	Name	Last club	Date to	Ref.
	GK	(Scotland)	Rab Douglas	Leicester City		

== Competitions ==
=== Overview ===
Competition	First match	Last match	Starting round	Final position	Record							
Competition	First match	Last match	Starting round	Final position	Pld	W	D	L	GF	GA	GD	Win %
Premier League	4 August 2007	22 May 2008	Matchday 1	3rd	38	18	6	14	50	46	+4	47.37
Scottish Cup	12 January 2008	11 February 2008	Fourth round	Fifth Round	3	1	1	1	4	4	+0	33.33
League Cup	29 August 2007	31 October 2007	Second round	Quarterfinal	3	2	0	1	8	5	+3	66.67
Total					44	21	7	16	62	55	+7	47.73

Last updated: 22 May 2008
Source: Soccerway

=== Premier League ===
==== Table ====
Pos	Team	Pld	W	D	L	GF	GA	GD	Pts	Qualification or relegation (Note: Teams played each other three times (33 matches), before the league split into two groups (the top six and the bottom six) for the last five matches.)
1	Celtic (C)	38	28	5	5	84	26	+58	89	Qualification for the Champions League group stage
2	Rangers	38	27	5	6	84	33	+51	86	Qualification for the Champions League second qualifying round
3	Motherwell	38	18	6	14	50	46	+4	60	Qualification for the UEFA Cup first round
4	Aberdeen	38	15	8	15	50	58	−8	53	
5	Dundee United	38	14	10	14	53	47	+6	52	

Source: Scottish Professional Football League
Rules for classification: 1) Points; 2) Goal difference; 3) Goals scored
(C) Champions

==== Results summary ====
Overall								Home						Away					
Pld	W	D	L	GF	GA	GD	Pts	W	D	L	GF	GA	GD	W	D	L	GF	GA	GD
38	18	6	14	50	46	+4	60	9	4	6	30	26	+4	9	2	8	20	20	0

Source: BBC Sport

==== Results by round ====
Round	1	2	3	4	5	6	7	8	9	10	11	12	13	14	15	16	17	18	19	20	21	22	23	24	25	26	27	28	29	30	31	32	33	34	35	36	37	38
Ground	A	H	H	A	H	A	A	H	A	H	A	H	A	A	H	A	H	H	A	H	A	H	A	H	H	A	A	A	A	H	A	H	H	H	A	H	H	A
Result	W	W	L	W	L	W	L	D	L	W	L	D	W	W	W	W	W	L	L	W	L	W	W	W	L	D	D	L	L	W	W	L	D	L	L	W	D	W
Position	4	3	4	3	5	4	5	5	6	5	6	5	5	5	5	3	3	3	3	3	4	4	3	3	3	3	3	4	5	4	3	3	3	3	3	3	3	3

Source: BBC Sport
A = Away; H = Home; W = Win; D = Draw; L = Loss

==== Results ====
Date	Opponent	Venue	Result	Attendance	Motherwell Scorer(s)	Report
4 August 2007	St Mirren	Love Street, Paisley (A)	1–0	5,257	McGarry (3)	BBC Sport
11 August 2007	Inverness C.T.	Fir Park, Motherwell (H)	2–1	4,259	O'Donnell 85', McCormack 90' (pen.)	
18 August 2007	Kilmarnock	Fir Park, Motherwell (H)	1–2	4,985	Clarkson (23)	
25 August 2007	Gretna	Fir Park, Motherwell (A)	2–1	3,758	Lasley (8), Porter (62)	BBC Sport
3 September 2007	Hearts	Fir Park, Motherwell (H)	0–2	5,081		
15 September 2007	Aberdeen	Pittodrie, Aberdeen (A)	2–1	10,154	Quinn (34), Porter (37)	BBC Sport
22 September 2007	Falkirk	Falkirk Stadium, Falkirk (A)	0–1	5,245		
29 August 2007	Rangers	Fir Park, Motherwell (H)	1–1	10,009	Porter (24)	BBC Sport
6 October 2007	Dundee United	Tannadice, Dundee (A)	0–1	6,286		BBC Sport
20 October 2007	Hibernian	Fir Park, Motherwell (H)	2–1	7,071	McCormack (35,37)	
27 October 2007	Celtic	Celtic Park, Glasgow (A)	0–3	57,566		BBC Sport
3 November 2007	St Mirren	Fir Park, Motherwell (H)	1–1	5,123	Porter (29)	BBC Sport
10 November 2007	Inverness C.T.	Caledonian Stadium, Inverness (A)	3–0	3,608	Clarkson (15,53), Smith (87)	
24 November 2007	Kilmarnock	Rugby Park, Kilmarnock (A)	1–0	5,016	O'Donnell (46)	BBC Sport
1 December 2007	Gretna	Fir Park, Motherwell (H)	3–0	6,431	Clarkson (44,74), Porter (61)	BBC Sport
8 December 2007	Hearts	Tynecastle, Edinburgh (A)	2–1	16,633	Porter (53), Zaliukas (67 og)	
15 December 2007	Aberdeen	Fir Park, Motherwell (H)	3–0	5,326	McCormack (8 pen.,45), McGarry (12)	BBC Sport
22 December 2007	Falkirk	Fir Park, Motherwell (H)	0–3	5,241		BBC Sport
26 December 2007	Rangers	Ibrox Stadium, Glasgow (A)	1–3	49,823	Quinn (65)	BBC Sport
29 December 2007	Dundee United	Fir Park, Motherwell (H)	5–3	5,227	Hughes (11), Porter (14), McCormack (17), Clarkson (55,56)	BBC Sport
19 January 2008	St Mirren	Love Street, Paisley (A)	1–3	4,291	Clarkson (11)	BBC Sport
9 February 2008	Kilmarnock	Fir Park, Motherwell (H)	1–0	6,618	Clarkson (90)	
16 February 2008	Gretna	Fir Park, Motherwell (A)	3–1	2,877	Porter (25), McCormack (47,90)	BBC Sport
20 February 2008	Inverness C.T.	Fir Park, Motherwell (H)	3–1	4,526	Clarkson (7,42), Porter (10)	
23 February 2008	Hearts	Fir Park, Motherwell (H)	0–1	5,925		
27 February 2008	Aberdeen	Pittodrie, Aberdeen (A)	1–1	8,240	Smith (83)	BBC Sport
1 March 2008	Falkirk	Falkirk Stadium, Falkirk (A)	0–0	5,108		BBC Sport
12 March 2008	Hibernian	Easter Road, Edinburgh (A)	0–1	11,692		BBC Sport
22 March 2008	Dundee United	Tannadice, Dundee (A)	0–2	6,779		BBC Sport
29 March 2008	Hibernian	Fir Park, Motherwell (H)	1–0	6,580	Clarkson (3)	
5 April 2008	Celtic	Celtic Park, Glasgow (A)	1–0	58,624	Lappin (43)	BBC Sport
13 April 2008	Celtic	Fir Park, Motherwell (H)	1–4	9,771	McManus (24 og)	BBC Sport
26 April 2008	Dundee United	Fir Park, Motherwell (H)	2–2	5,027	Porter (17,50)	
3 May 2008	Celtic	Fir Park, Motherwell (H)	1–2	9,158	Porter (60)	BBC Sport
7 May 2008	Rangers	Ibrox Stadium, Glasgow (A)	0–1	48,238		BBC Sport
10 May 2008	Aberdeen	Fir Park, Motherwell (H)	2–1	8,574	Smith (61), Porter (81)	BBC Sport
17 May 2008	Rangers	Fir Park, Motherwell (H)	1–1	10,445	Porter (50)	BBC Sport
22 May 2008	Hibernian	Easter Road, Edinburgh (A)	2–0	10,754	Lappin 4', Murphy 50' (pen.)	BBC Sport

=== Scottish Cup 2007–08 ===
Date	Round	Opponent	H/A	Score	Motherwell Scorer(s)	Attendance	Report
12 January 2008	4th Round	Hearts	A	2–2	Chris Porter (64,78)	13,651	BBC Sport
22 January 2008	4th Round Replay	Hearts	H	1–0	Ross McCormack (23 pen.)	8,300	—
11 February 2008	5th Round	Dundee	H	1–2	Darren Smith (61)	5,733	—

=== Scottish League Cup 2007–08 ===
Date	Round	Opponent	H/A	Score	Motherwell Scorer(s)	Attendance	Report
29 August 2007	2nd Round	Raith Rovers	H	3–1	Brian McLean (45), Ross McCormack (74), Chris Porter (90)	3,571	—
26 September 2007	3rd Round	Hibernian	A	4–2	David Clarkson (17), Keith Lasley (20), Ross McCormack (24), Chris Porter (83)	7,000	BBC Sport
31 October 2007	Quarter-finals	Rangers	H	1–2	Paul Quinn (90)	9,283	BBC Sport

== Squad statistics ==
=== Appearances ===
As of match played 22 May 2008

No.	Pos	Nat	Player	Total		Premier League		Scottish Cup		League Cup	
No.	Pos	Nat	Player	Apps	Goals	Apps	Goals	Apps	Goals	Apps	Goals
1	GK	(Scotland) SCO	Graeme Smith	42	0	36	0	3	0	3	0
2	DF	(Scotland) SCO	Martyn Corrigan	1	0	0	0	0	0	1	0
3	DF	(Scotland) SCO	Steven Hammell	16	0	15	0	1	0	0	0
4	DF	(Scotland) SCO	Mark Reynolds	44	0	38	0	3	0	3	0
5	DF	(Northern Ireland) NIR	Stephen Craigan	43	0	38	0	3	0	2	0
6	DF	(Northern Ireland) NIR	Brian McLean	11	1	6+3	0	1	0	1	1
7	MF	(Scotland) SCO	Stephen Hughes	35	1	29+2	1	3	0	1	0
8	MF	(Scotland) SCO	Simon Lappin	15	2	7+7	2	0+1	0	0	0
9	FW	(England) ENG	Chris Porter	42	18	34+3	14	2	2	2+1	2
11	FW	(Scotland) SCO	Ross McCormack	42	11	30+6	8	3	1	3	2
12	FW	(Scotland) SCO	David Clarkson	41	13	34+1	12	3	0	2+1	1
14	MF	(Scotland) SCO	Keith Lasley	38	2	25+7	1	3	0	3	1
15	GK	(England) ENG	Luke Daniels	2	0	2	0	0	0	0	0
16	MF	(Scotland) SCO	Marc Fitzpatrick	35	0	19+11	0	2+1	0	1+1	0
17	MF	(Scotland) SCO	Bob Malcolm	8	0	8	0	0	0	0	0
18	MF	(Scotland) SCO	Steven McGarry	34	2	27+3	2	2	0	1+1	0
22	DF	(Scotland) SCO	Paul Quinn	35	3	31	2	2	0	2	1
23	MF	(Scotland) SCO	Darren Smith	27	4	4+19	3	0+3	1	1	0
27	MF	(Scotland) SCO	Stephen Maguire	1	0	0+1	0	0	0	0	0
32	FW	(Scotland) SCO	Jamie Murphy	17	1	0+16	1	0+1	0	0	0
44	FW	(Scotland) SCO	Bob McHugh	1	0	0+1	0	0	0	0	0
Players away from the club on loan:
24	FW	(Scotland) SCO	Martin Grehan	1	0	0+1	0	0	0	0	0
Players who left Motherwell during the season:
3	DF	(Scotland) SCO	Jim Paterson	25	0	20	0	2	0	3	0
8	MF	(Germany) GER	Simon Mensing	4	0	0+2	0	0	0	1+1	0
10	MF	(Scotland) SCO	Phil O'Donnell	19	2	15+3	2	0	0	0+1	0
15	FW	(England) ENG	Lewis Grabban	6	0	0+5	0	0	0	0+1	0
17	DF	(Scotland) SCO	Willie Kinniburgh	2	0	0+1	0	0	0	1	0
21	DF	(Republic of Ireland) IRL	Danny Murphy	2	0	0+2	0	0	0	0	0

=== Goal scorers ===
As of match played 22 May 2008

Ranking	Nation	Position	Number	Name	Premier League	Scottish Cup	League Cup	Total
1	FW	(England)	9	Chris Porter	14	2	2	18
2	FW	(Scotland)	12	David Clarkson	12	0	1	13
3	FW	(Scotland)	11	Ross McCormack	8	1	2	11
4	DF	(Scotland)	22	Paul Quinn	2	1	1	4
5	DF	(Scotland)	23	Darren Smith	3	0	0	3
6	MF	(Scotland)	8	Simon Lappin	2	0	0	2
6	MF	(Scotland)	18	Steven McGarry	2	0	0	2
6	MF	(Scotland)	10	Phil O'Donnell	2	0	0	2
6	MF	(Scotland)	14	Keith Lasley	1	0	1	2
6				Own goal	2	0	0	2
11	MF	(Scotland)	7	Stephen Hughes	1	0	0	1
11	FW	(Scotland)	32	Jamie Murphy	1	0	0	1
11	DF	(Northern Ireland)	6	Brian McLean	0	0	1	1
TOTALS					50	4	8	62

=== Clean sheets ===
As of match played 22 May 2008

Ranking	Nation	Position	Number	Name	Premier League	Scottish Cup	League Cup	Total
1	GK	(Scotland)	1	Graeme Smith	9	1	0	10
1	GK	(England)	15	Luke Daniels	1	0	0	1
TOTALS					10	1	0	11

=== Disciplinary record ===
As of match played 22 May 2008

Nation	Position	Number	Name	Premier League		Scottish Cup		League Cup		Total	
Nation	Position	Number	Name	Yellow card	Red card	Yellow card	Red card	Yellow card	Red card	Yellow card	Red card
(Scotland)	GK	1	Graeme Smith	1	0	1	0	2	0	4	0
(Scotland)	DF	2	Martyn Corrigan	5	2	0	0	0	0	5	2
(Scotland)	DF	3	Steven Hammell	1	0	0	0	1	0	2	0
(Scotland)	DF	4	Mark Reynolds	0	0	0	0	1	0	1	0
(Northern Ireland)	DF	5	Stephen Craigan	6	0	2	0	0	0	8	0
(Northern Ireland)	DF	6	Brian McLean	1	0	0	0	0	0	1	0
(Scotland)	MF	7	Stephen Hughes	4	0	0	0	1	0	5	0
(Scotland)	MF	8	Simon Lappin	2	0	0	0	1	0	3	0
(England)	FW	9	Chris Porter	6	0	0	0	0	0	6	0
(Scotland)	FW	11	Ross McCormack	5	0	0	0	0	0	5	0
(Scotland)	FW	12	David Clarkson	7	0	0	0	0	0	7	0
(Scotland)	MF	14	Keith Lasley	5	0	1	0	1	0	7	0
(Scotland)	MF	16	Marc Fitzpatrick	3	0	0	0	1	0	4	0
(Scotland)	MF	17	Bob Malcolm	2	1	0	0	0	0	2	1
(Scotland)	MF	18	Steven McGarry	1	0	0	0	1	0	2	0
(Scotland)	DF	23	Paul Quinn	7	0	2	0	0	0	9	0
(Scotland)	FW	23	Darren Smith	1	0	0	0	0	0	1	0
Players away from Motherwell on loan:
Players who left Motherwell during the season:
(Scotland)	DF	3	Jim Paterson	6	0	0	0	1	0	7	0
(Germany)	MF	8	Simon Mensing	1	0	0	0	0	0	1	0
(Scotland)	MF	10	Phil O'Donnell	3	0	0	0	1	0	4	0
			TOTALS	63	1	6	0	10	0	79	1

== See also ==
- List of Motherwell F.C. seasons
