= 2005 Scottish League Cup final =

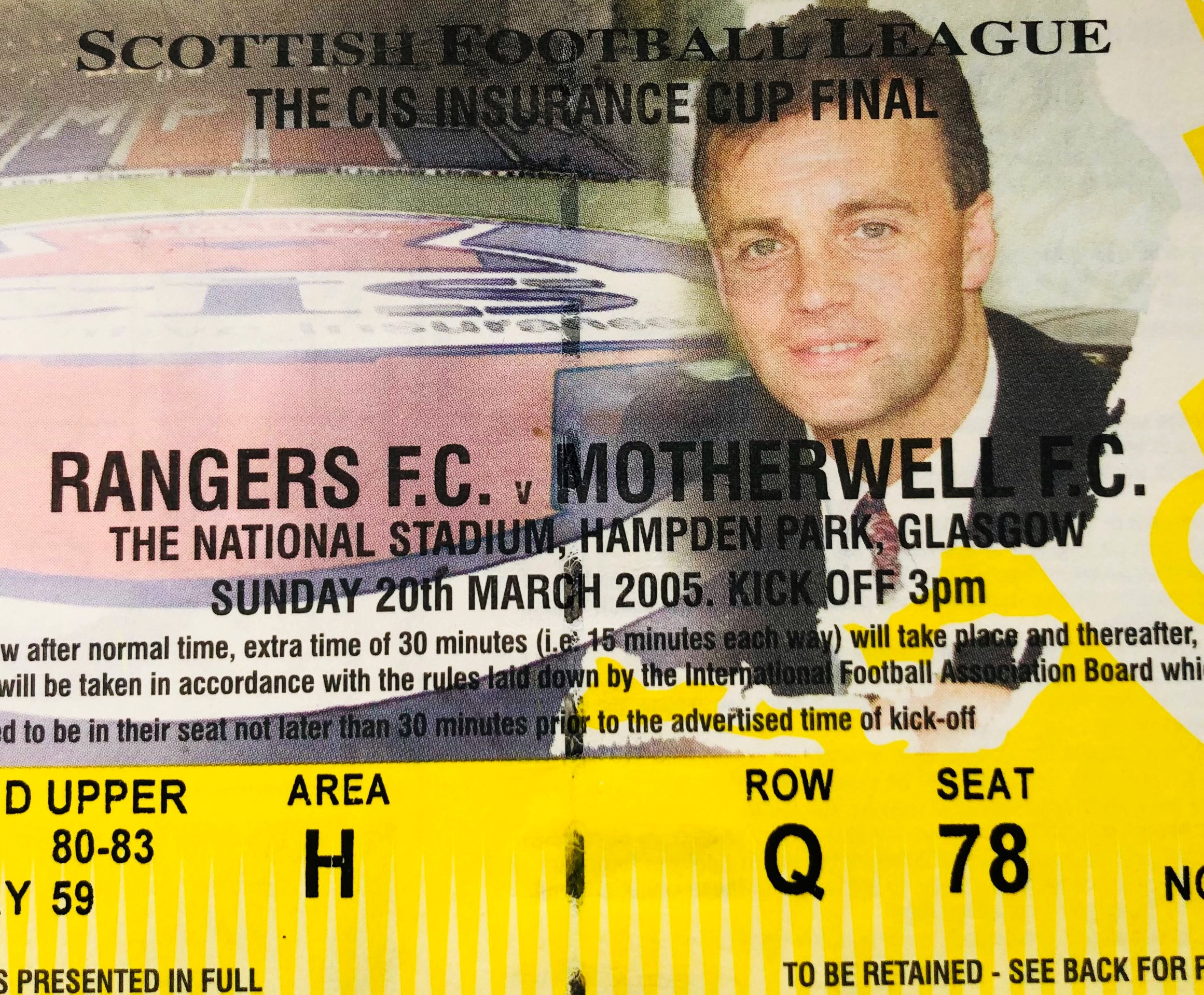
- Davie Cooper (who played for both clubs) featured on the tickets for the final.
- Event: 2004–05 Scottish League Cup
Rangers	Motherwell
5	1
- Date: 20 March 2005
- Venue: Hampden Park, Glasgow
- Man of the Match: Sotirios Kyrgiakos
- Referee: Mike McCurry
- Attendance: 50,182

The 2005 Scottish League Cup final was played on 20 March 2005 at Hampden Park in Glasgow and was the final of the 58th Scottish League Cup.

The final was contested by Rangers and Motherwell. Rangers won the match 5–1, with goals from Maurice Ross, Fernando Ricksen, Nacho Novo and a double from Sotirios Kyrgiakos.

The match was popularly known as "The Cooper Final", in honour of Davie Cooper, who was a prominent player for both clubs. Cooper had died almost 10 years to the day before the 2005 League Cup final was played.

== Match details ==
20 March 2005

Rangers	5–1	Motherwell
Ross 5'; Kyrgiakos 9', 86'; Ricksen 33'; Novo 48'	Report	Partridge 13'

Hampden Park, Glasgow
Attendance: 50,182
Referee: Mike McCurry

Rangers	Motherwell

RANGERS :
GK	25	(Netherlands) Ronald Waterreus
RB	21	(Scotland) Maurice Ross
CB	16	(Greece) Sotirios Kyrgiakos
CB	12	(Scotland) Robert Malcolm
LB	18	(England) Michael Ball
RM	2	(Netherlands) Fernando Ricksen (c)
CM	6	(Scotland) Barry Ferguson
CM	4	(Belgium) Thomas Buffel
LM	24	(France) Grégory Vignal	(substituted off) 79'
CF	9	(Croatia) Dado Pršo
CF	10	(Spain) Nacho Novo	(substituted off) 84'
Substitutes:
GK	30	(Scotland) Graeme Smith
DF	15	(Georgia (country)) Zurab Khizanishvili
MF	8	(Scotland) Alex Rae	(substituted on) 79'
MF	26	(Denmark) Peter Løvenkrands
FW	19	(Scotland) Steven Thompson	(substituted on) 84'
Manager:
(Scotland) Alex McLeish

MOTHERWELL:
GK	1	(Scotland) Gordon Marshall
RB	2	(Scotland) Martyn Corrigan
CB	5	(Northern Ireland) Stephen Craigan
CB	14	(Wales) David Partridge
LB	3	(Scotland) Steven Hammell
RM	17	(Scotland) Kevin McBride	(substituted off) 83'
CM	8	(Scotland) Scott Leitch (c)
CM	10	(Scotland) Phil O'Donnell
LM	18	(Scotland) Jim Paterson	(substituted off) 65'
CF	7	(Australia) Scott McDonald
CF	9	(Republic of Ireland) Richie Foran	(substituted off) 65'
Substitutes:
GK	15	(Scotland) Barry John Corr
DF	19	(Scotland) Paul Quinn	(substituted on) 83'
DF	24	(Scotland) Marc Fitzpatrick	(substituted on) 65'
MF	21	(Scotland) Shaun Fagan
FW	12	(Scotland) David Clarkson	(substituted on) 65'
Manager:
(England) Terry Butcher
