= Marc Fitzpatrick =

Scottish footballer

Personal information
- Date of birth: 11 May 1986 (age 40)
- Place of birth: Lanark, Scotland
- Height: 1.78 m (5 ft 10 in)
- Position: Left back

Youth career
- 2000–2004: Motherwell

Senior career*
Years	Team	Apps	(Gls)
2004–2011	Motherwell	121	(4)
2011–2013	Ross County	50	(0)
2013	Queen of the South	4	(0)
2013–2014	Greenock Morton	29	(1)
2014–2018	Airdrieonians	79	(9)
Total		283	(14)

International career
2007	Scotland U21	3	(0)

Managerial career
- 2017–2019: Airdrieonians (assistant)
- 2018: Airdrieonians (caretaker)
- * Club domestic league appearances and goals

Marc Fitzpatrick (born 11 May 1986) is a Scottish professional football coach and a former player. He played a left winger or left back. He has previously played for Motherwell, Ross County, Queen of the South and Greenock Morton.

== Career ==
=== Club ===
Fitzpatrick came through the youth system at Motherwell and made his debut against Celtic on 12 May 2004.

In 2004–05, Fitzpatrick scored a last-minute winner in a Scottish League Cup semi-final against Hearts at Easter Road. The 3–2 win after extra time earned Motherwell their first major final appearance since the 1991 Scottish Cup Final. Remarkably, it was his first senior goal for the club. In May 2008, Fitzpatrick signed a two-year contract extension with the Fir Park outfit.

On 13 January 2011, Fitzpatrick signed a two-year deal with Highland team Ross County, after rejecting the offer of a six-month extension at Fir Park.

Fitzpatrick joined the Dumfries club, Queen of the South on 19 March 2013, until the end of the season after playing as a trialist on 16 March 2013 at Gayfield Park versus Arbroath, where he played for 65 minutes. On 7 April 2013, he played the full match as Queen of the South won the 2013 Scottish Challenge Cup, defeating Partick Thistle 6–5 on penalties following a 1–1 draw after extra-time.

Fitzpatrick moved to Greenock Morton on 9 July 2013, after playing in a trial match against former club Motherwell on the Saturday. He left the club at the end of the season in search of part-time football.

On 4 June 2014, Fitzpatrick signed for Airdrieonians where he has since been made captain.

=== International ===
Fitzpatrick made three appearances for the Scotland under-21 side in 2007.

== Career statistics ==
As of match played 21 October 2017

Appearances and goals by club, season and competition
Club	Season	League			Scottish Cup		League Cup		Other		Total	
Club	Season	Division	Apps	Goals	Apps	Goals	Apps	Goals	Apps	Goals	Apps	Goals
Motherwell	2003–04	Premier League	2	0	0	0	0	0	0	0	2	0
Motherwell	2004–05	Premier League	25	1	1	0	3	1	0	0	29	2
Motherwell	2005–06	Premier League	9	1	1	0	0	0	0	0	10	1
Motherwell	2006–07	Premier League	24	1	2	0	2	0	0	0	28	1
Motherwell	2007–08	Premier League	30	0	3	0	2	0	0	0	35	0
Motherwell	2008–09	Premier League	23	1	3	0	1	0	1 (Note: Appearances in the Europa League)	0	28	1
Motherwell	2009–10	Premier League	3	0	0	0	0	0	1	0	4	0
Motherwell	2010–11	Premier League	5	0	1	0	0	0	1	0	7	0
Motherwell	Total		121	4	11	0	8	1	3	0	143	5
Ross County	2010–11	First Division	17	0	0	0	0	0	1 (Note: Appearances in the Scottish Challenge Cup)	0	18	0
Ross County	2011–12	First Division	13	0	1	0	3	0	0	0	17	0
Ross County	2012–13	Scottish Premier League	20	0	2	0	1	0	0	0	23	0
Ross County	Total		50	0	3	0	4	0	1	0	58	0
Queen of the South	2012–13	Second Division	4	0	0	0	0	0	1	0	5	0
Greenock Morton	2013–14	Championship	29	1	1	0	4	1	1	0	35	1
Airdrieonians	2014–15	League One	35	4	2	0	1	0	1	0	39	4
Airdrieonians	2015–16	League One	30	4	2	0	0	0	0	0	32	4
Airdrieonians	2016–17	League One	14	1	0	0	3	0	2	0	19	1
Airdrieonians	2017–18	League One	0	0	0	0	1	0	0	0	1	0
Airdrieonians	Total		79	9	4	0	5	0	3	0	91	9
Career total			283	14	19	0	21	1	9	0	332	15

== Honours ==
Motherwell

- Scottish League Cup: runner-up 2004–05

Ross County

- Scottish First Division: 2011–12
- Scottish Challenge Cup: 2010–11

Queen of the South

- Scottish Challenge Cup: 2012–13

== See also ==
Greenock Morton F.C. season 2013–14
