= Darren Smith (footballer, born 1988) =

Scottish footballer

Personal information
- Full name: Darren Lee Smith
- Date of birth: 27 March 1988 (age 38)
- Place of birth: Lanark, Scotland
- Height: 1.83 m (6 ft 0 in)
- Positions: Winger; forward

Senior career*
Years	Team	Apps	(Gls)
2004–2010	Motherwell	72	(8)
2010	→ Stenhousemuir (loan)	2	(0)
2010–2011	Ross County	7	(0)
2011–2012	Stirling Albion	33	(4)
2012–2014	Stenhousemuir	58	(22)
2014–2019	Stirling Albion	121	(61)
2019–2020	Clyde	22	(4)
2020–2021	East Kilbride		
2021	→ Edinburgh City (loan)	2	(0)

International career
- Scotland U19
2007	Scotland U20	1	(0)
2007	Scotland U21	1	(0)
- * Club domestic league appearances and goals

Darren Lee Smith (born 27 March 1988) is a Scottish former professional footballer.

Smith represented the Scotland national under-21 football team once and played nearly 60 Scottish Premier League (SPL) games for Motherwell. He has also played for Ross County, Stenhousemuir, Stirling Albion, Clyde, Edinburgh City and East Kilbride on loan.

== Early life ==
Smith was born in Lanark and attended Carluke High School in South Lanarkshire.

== Club career ==
=== Motherwell ===
Smith started his football career at boyhood heroes Motherwell, and became one of their youngest ever players when he made his debut aged 16, appearing as a substitute against Inverness CT in the 2004–05 season. It would be the 2005–06 season before he would feature in the team again, coming on as a substitute as Motherwell defeated Falkirk 5–0. A few days later, he scored his first goal for the club against St Mirren in the League Cup. He then suffered an injury which ruled him out for the rest of the season.

The 2006–07 season was a more prolific one for Smith. Despite this being an unsuccessful season for Motherwell, who finished 10th in the SPL, Smith made 13 starts and 6 substitute appearances, scoring three goals. The first and most notable of his goals was a last minute equaliser against Celtic on 30 December 2006.

The 2007–08 season was Smith's most successful in his time at Motherwell so far, as Motherwell finished 3rd in the SPL and qualified for the UEFA Cup. He made 27 appearances, scoring four goals. Two came against Aberdeen in the SPL, the second being the opener in the 2–1 victory on 10 May that effectively sealed Motherwell's UEFA Cup qualification.

Smith found himself on the fringes of the first team in the 2008–09 season, making only one start and failing to find the net. At the start of the 2009–10 season, he was forced to have hip surgery after tearing cartilage during pre-season.

Smith spent a month on loan at Stenhousemuir in early 2010, but played only twice due to injury.

Smith was released by Motherwell at the end of the 2009–10 season.

=== Ross County ===
After leaving Motherwell, Smith had a trial at Inverness Caledonian Thistle. He then signed for Ross County on a one-year deal. Manager Derek Adams commented that "Darren is a young player with a lot of potential as well as a lot of experience. I'm delighted that after his trial period we have been able to reach an agreement with him."

=== Stirling Albion ===
On 28 July 2011, Smith signed for Stirling Albion of the Second Division after being released by Ross County. He left the club in May 2012.

=== Stenhousemuir ===
Smith signed for Stenhousemuir during the 2012 summer transfer window.

=== Stirling Albion ===
In June 2014, Smith signed for Stirling Albion for a second time. In January 2016, he was named as Scottish League Two Player of the Month for December 2015. On 9 February 2016, in Stirling Albion's 7–0 win against Montrose, Smith scored a hat-trick in the space of four minutes.

Smith won two more Player of the Month awards during the 2017–18 season, in August and December. At the end of the season he was voted PFA Scotland League Two Player of the Season.

=== Clyde ===
On 24 May 2019, Smith signed for Clyde on a one-year contract.

=== East Kilbride ===
Lowland League club East Kilbride announced the signing of Smith on 15 July 2020. Smith was loaned to Edinburgh City in March 2021.

== International career ==
Smith made his debut for the Scotland under-21s in the spring of 2007, playing the second half of a 2–0 defeat against the Germany under-21s. He also played for his country at under-19 and under-20 level.

== Career statistics ==
As of 21:21, 16 July 2020

Appearances and goals by club, season and competition
Club	Season	League			Scottish Cup		League Cup		Other		Total	
Club	Season	Division	Apps	Goals	Apps	Goals	Apps	Goals	Apps	Goals	Apps	Goals
Motherwell	2004–05	Scottish Premier League	1	0	0	0	0	0	0	0	1	0
Motherwell	2005–06	Scottish Premier League	1	0	0	0	1	0	0	0	2	0
Motherwell	2006–07	Scottish Premier League	17	3	2	0	0	0	0	0	19	3
Motherwell	2007–08	Scottish Premier League	23	3	3	1	1	0	0	0	27	4
Motherwell	2008–09	Scottish Premier League	16	0	3	0	0	0	2 (Note: Appearances in the Europa League)	0	21	0
Motherwell	2009–10	Scottish Premier League	0	0	0	0	0	0	0	0	0	0
Motherwell	Total		58	6	8	1	2	0	2	0	70	7
Stenhousemuir (loan)	2009–10	Scottish Second Division	2	0	0	0	0	0	0	0	2	0
Ross County	2010–11	Scottish First Division	7	0	0	0	1	0	1 (Note: Appearances in the Scottish Challenge Cup)	0	9	0
Stirling Albion	2011–12	Scottish Second Division	33	4	1	1	1	0	1	0	36	5
Stenhousemuir	2012–13	Scottish Second Division	32	9	3	2	3	2	3	0	41	13
Stenhousemuir	2013–14	Scottish League One	26	7	2	0	1	1	4	1	33	9
Stenhousemuir	Total		58	16	5	2	4	3	7	1	74	22
Stirling Albion	2014–15	Scottish League One	13	1	0	0	1	0	1	1	15	2
Stirling Albion	2015–16	Scottish League Two	24	9	5	0	0	0	0	0	29	9
Stirling Albion	2016–17	Scottish League Two	30	11	2	0	4	1	1	0	37	12
Stirling Albion	2017–18	Scottish League Two	31	22	1	1	4	1	3 (Note: One appearance and one goal in the Scottish Challenge Cup and two appearances in the Scottish League One play-offs)	1	39	25
Stirling Albion	2018–19	Scottish League Two	23	11	0	0	0	0	0	0	23	11
Stirling Albion	Total		121	54	8	1	9	2	5	2	143	59
Clyde	2019–20	Scottish League Two	22	2	0	0	4	1	1	0	26	3
Career total			301	82	22	5	21	6	17	3	361	96
