= Graeme Smith (footballer, born 1983) =

Scottish footballer (born 1983)

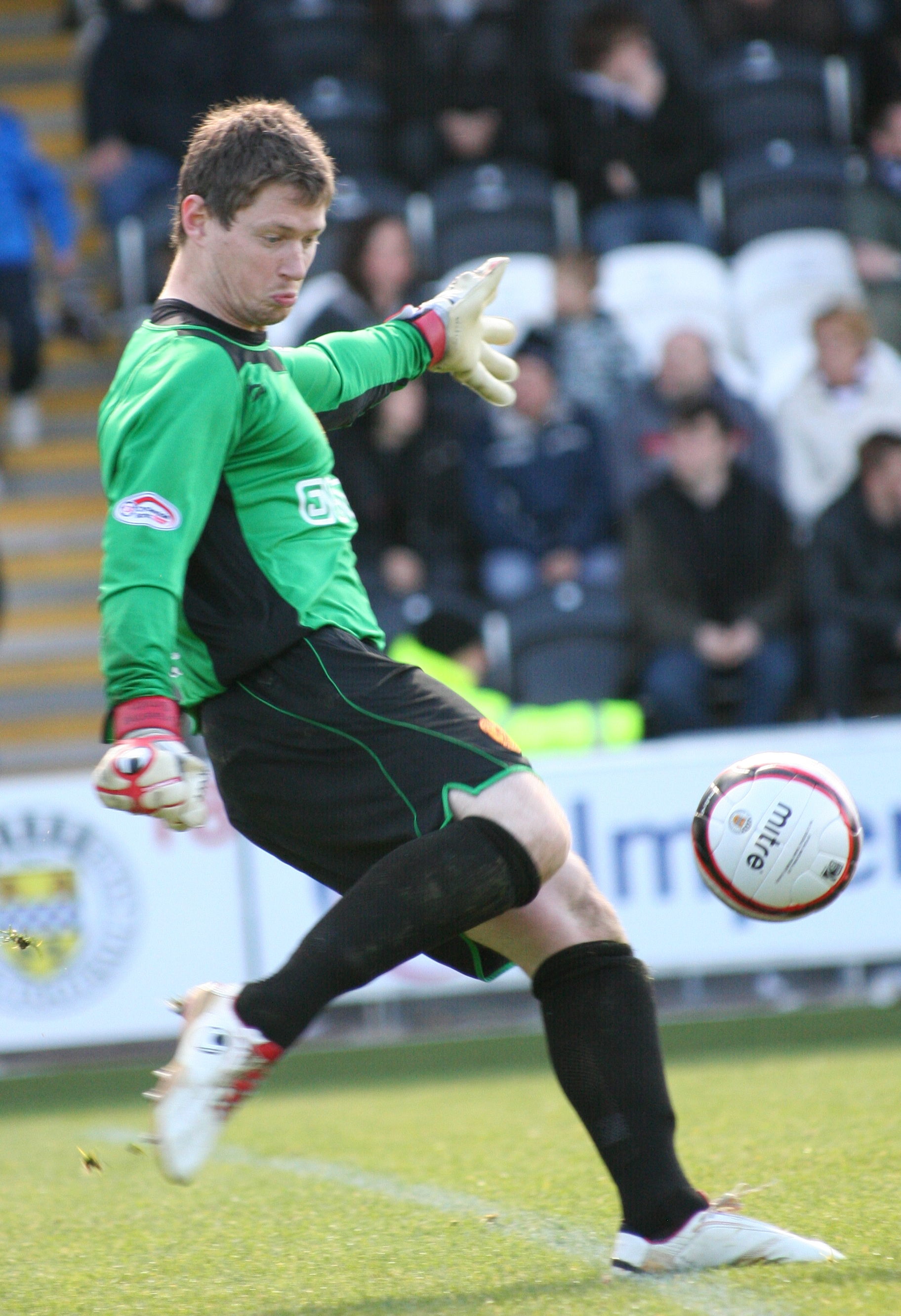
- Smith playing for Motherwell in 2009

Personal information
- Full name: Graeme Meldrum Smith
- Date of birth: 8 June 1983 (age 43)
- Place of birth: Edinburgh, Scotland
- Position: Goalkeeper

Youth career
- 1999–2003: Rangers

Senior career*
Years	Team	Apps	(Gls)
2003–2005	Rangers	0	(0)
2003–2004	→ Ross County (loan)	20	(0)
2005–2009	Motherwell	127	(0)
2009–2010	Brighton & Hove Albion	6	(0)
2010–2011	Hibernian	16	(0)
2011–2012	Gabala	7	(0)
2012–2013	Partick Thistle	6	(0)
2013	Ayr United	15	(0)
2013–2018	Brechin City	165	(0)
2018–2022	Stenhousemuir	64	(0)
2022	→ Berwick Rangers (loan)	0	(0)
Total		426	(0)

International career
2004–2005	Scotland U21	8	(0)
2007	Scotland B	1	(0)
- * Club domestic league appearances and goals

Graeme Meldrum Smith (born 8 June 1983) is a Scottish former professional footballer who played as a goalkeeper. He was employed as the goalkeeping coach at Bonnyrigg Rose Athletic but left in March 2024. He then went back to Bonnyrigg Rose in May 2025 and is now their Goalkeeper Coach having retired.

Smith started his career at Rangers, later playing for Ross County, Motherwell, Brighton, Hibernian, Gabala, Partick Thistle, Ayr United, Brechin City, Stenhousemuir and Berwick Rangers.

== Career ==
Smith was born in Edinburgh. He started his career with Rangers but failed to make an appearance for the club. During his time at Ibrox, Smith spent the 2003–04 season on loan to Scottish First Division side Ross County.

=== Motherwell ===
On 25 June 2005, Smith signed for Motherwell. During four seasons at Fir Park, Smith made 127 SPL appearances for Motherwell. Smith was included in the Scotland squad to face the Faroe Islands and Lithuania in Euro 2008 qualifiers played in September 2006, but he did not play in either game. Smith made one appearance for the Scotland B team during this time, playing in a 1–1 draw with the Republic of Ireland B team in November 2007. He was part of the Motherwell side that finished third in the SPL in the 2007–08 season, qualifying for the 2008–09 UEFA Cup.

=== Brighton & Hove Albion ===
On 1 July 2009, Smith transferred to English League One side Brighton & Hove Albion, signing a two-year contract. However, he conceded five goals on his debut, coming as a substitute after the regular goalkeeper Michel Kuipers had been sent off, as Brighton lost 7–1 at Huddersfield. Smith went on to make nine further appearances for Brighton.

=== Hibernian ===
Smith returned to the SPL on 1 January 2010 by signing for Hibernian on a free transfer. He immediately took possession of the goalkeeper position at Hibs, as manager John Hughes sought to put a "goalkeeping school" in place. Smith was involved in a remarkable game towards the end of the 2009–10 season, as he conceded six goals against his former club Motherwell, the match finishing drawn 6–6. Smith eventually fell behind Mark Brown and Graham Stack in the selection order under the management of Colin Calderwood and was released by the club in April 2011. He had made 16 league appearances during his 15 months with the club.

=== Gabala ===
Smith was invited by Tony Adams to train with Azerbaijan Premier League club Gabala in July 2011. Smith signed a one-year contract with Gabala after a pre-season tour of England. He made his debut for Gabala in an Azerbaijan Cup tie against Neftchala, in which they won 3–0. Smith made his league debut on 7 March in a 3–2 defeat against Kəpəz. On 17 May, Smith's contract was not renewed by Gabala.

=== Return to Scotland ===
Smith trained with Dunfermline, in his native Scotland, in July 2012. On 13 November 2012, he signed a 9-week deal with Scottish First Division club Partick Thistle. Smith scored an own goal in his debut appearance for Thistle, a 1–0 defeat against Hamilton on 16 November. He left the club at the end of his contract.

Smith signed a contract with Ayr United in February 2013 for the remainder of the season.

=== Brechin City ===
On 3 July 2013, Smith signed for Scottish League One side Brechin City. He signed a new two-year contract on 19 May 2014.

On 21 November 2015, Smith travelled to the Ochilview ground for the away game against Stenhousemuir. Unfortunately for him, the match was actually a home fixture for Brechin, 83 miles away. He did make it in time to play, but the side lost 2–1.

Smith extended his contract with Brechin City for another year on 1 June 2016. After five year with Brechin, Smith left Glebe Park at the end of the 2017–18 season.

=== Stenhousemuir ===
On 22 May 2018, Smith signed a two-year contract with Scottish League One side Stenhousemuir. On 22 April 2022, Smith joined Lowland League side Berwick Rangers on an emergency loan for the remainder of the 2021–22 season.

== Career statistics ==
As of match played 24 October 2020

Appearances and goals by club, season and competition
Club	Season	League			National cup		League cup		Other		Total	
Club	Season	Division	Apps	Goals	Apps	Goals	Apps	Goals	Apps	Goals	Apps	Goals
Rangers	2003–04	Scottish Premier League	0	0	0	0	0	0	0	0	0	0
Rangers	2004–05	Scottish Premier League	0	0	0	0	0	0	0	0	0	0
Rangers	Total		0	0	0	0	0	0	0	0	0	0
Ross County (Loan)	2003–04	Scottish First Division	20	0	1	0	0	0	0	0	21	0
Motherwell	2005–06	Scottish Premier League	30	0	1	0	3	0	0	0	34	0
Motherwell	2006–07	Scottish Premier League	24	0	3	0	1	0	0	0	28	0
Motherwell	2007–08	Scottish Premier League	36	0	3	0	3	0	0	0	42	0
Motherwell	2008–09	Scottish Premier League	37	0	3	0	1	0	2 (Note: Appearances in the Europa League)	0	43	0
Motherwell	Total		127	0	10	0	8	0	2	0	147	0
Brighton & Hove Albion	2009–10	League One	6	0	3	0	0	0	1 (Note: Appearance in the Football League Trophy)	0	10	0
Hibernian	2009–10	Scottish Premier League	12	0	3	0	0	0	0	0	15	0
Hibernian	2010–11	Scottish Premier League	4	0	1	0	0	0	1	0	6	0
Hibernian	Total		16	0	4	0	0	0	1	0	21	0
Gabala	2011–12	Azerbaijan Premier League	7	0	1	0	0	0	0	0	8	0
Partick Thistle	2012–13	Scottish First Division	6	0	1	0	0	0	0	0	7	0
Ayr United	2012–13	Scottish League One	15	0	0	0	0	0	0	0	15	0
Brechin City	2013–14	Scottish League One	31	0	3	0	1	0	1 (Note: Appearances in the Scottish Challenge Cup)	0	36	0
Brechin City	2014–15	Scottish League One	35	0	4	0	1	0	4 (Note: Two appearances in the Scottish Challenge Cup and two in the Championship play-offs)	0	44	0
Brechin City	2015–16	Scottish League One	34	0	1	0	1	0	1	0	37	0
Brechin City	2016–17	Scottish League One	34	0	1	0	4	0	6 (Note: Two appearances in the Scottish Challenge Cup and four in the Championship play-offs)	0	45	0
Brechin City	2017–18	Scottish Championship	31	0	2	0	4	0	1	0	38	0
Brechin City	Total		165	0	11	0	11	0	13	0	200	0
Stenhousemuir	2018–19	Scottish League One	35	0	3	0	3	0	3 (Note: One appearance in the Scottish Challenge Cup and two in the League Two play-offs)	0	44	0
Stenhousemuir	2019–20	Scottish League Two	27	0	1	0	3	0	3	0	34	0
Stenhousemuir	2020–21	Scottish League Two	2	0	0	0	0	0	0	0	2	0
Stenhousemuir	Total		64	0	4	0	6	0	6	0	80	0
Career total			436	0	35	0	25	0	23	0	509	0

== Honours ==
Rangers

- Scottish League Cup: 2005
