= Abel Thermeus =

Haitian footballer (born 1983)

Personal information
- Date of birth: 19 January 1983 (age 43)
- Place of birth: Montreuil-sous-Bois, France
- Height: 1.82 m (6 ft 0 in)
- Position: Striker

Youth career
- 1999–2001: AS Monaco

Senior career*
Years	Team	Apps	(Gls)
	AS Monaco	0	(0)
2000–2004	AS Monaco B		
2004–2006	US Créteil-Lusitanos	3	(0)
2006	→ Motherwell F.C. (loan)	1	(0)
2006–2008	Levante B	20	(9)
2008–2009	Debreceni VSC	12	(7)
2010	Atromitos Yeroskipou		

International career^{‡}
2008–2009	Haiti	8	(0)
- * Club domestic league appearances and goals as of 14 February 2008 ‡ National team caps and goals as of 22 August 2008

Abel Thermeus (born 19 January 1983) is a Haitian football player who played as a striker. He played for Atromitos Yeroskipou.

France-born Thermeus spent a couple of unsuccessful years at Monaco before moving to lower league side Créteil. In January 2006, he move to Scottish Premier League side Motherwell, where he quickly gained the nickname "The Flask". He is strong with a good touch and an eye for goal which will give us something extra," manager Terry Butcher told the club website.Thermeus played two league games for Motherwell as a substitute, the second of which, against Kilmarnock, he was sent-off for a headbutt. In summer 2006, he signed for Levante UD. In July 2008, he played a trial game with English League Two side Bradford City against Guiseley, which Bradford lost 2–1.

== International career ==
"The fox" made his debut for Haiti in an October 2007 friendly match against Costa Rica and played in the February 2008 friendly series against Venezuela, which served as a warm-up for the 2010 FIFA World Cup qualification match against Nicaragua or the Netherlands Antilles.
