= Adam Coakley =

Scottish footballer (born 1987)

Personal information
- Full name: Adam Thomas Coakley
- Date of birth: 19 October 1987 (age 39)
- Place of birth: Glasgow, Scotland
- Height: 5 ft 9 in (1.75 m)
- Position: Striker

Team information
- Current team: Thorniewood United (manager)

Senior career*
Years	Team	Apps	(Gls)
2004–2007	Motherwell	3	(0)
2007	→ Stenhousemuir (loan)	1	(0)
2007–2008	Greenock Morton	2	(0)
2007	→ Alloa Athletic (loan)	5	(1)
2007	→ Stranraer (loan)	4	(0)
2008	Alloa Athletic	11	(3)
2008–2009	Queen's Park	20	(3)
2009	Clyde	5	(0)
2010–2011	Glenafton Athletic	12	(3)
2011–	Kirkintilloch Rob Roy	3	(5)

International career
2006–2007	Scotland U18	3	(0)

Managerial career
- 2024-: Thorniewood United
- * Club domestic league appearances and goals as of 27 May 2011

Adam Thomas Coakley (born 19 October 1987 in Glasgow) is a Scottish former footballer who played as a striker. He is currently manager of West of Scotland Football League side Thorniewood United. He is the son of property tycoon Tom Coakley, who in 2007 expressed an interest in buying Motherwell where his son was a player. Coakley quit football at the age of 22, but has since has returned to play junior football with Glenafton Athletic and Kirkintilloch Rob Roy.

== Career ==
=== Motherwell ===
Coakley started his career at Motherwell, becoming a regular scorer for the reserves and made his debut as a late substitute for Jim Hamilton in the 2005 Boxing Day 3–1 victory against Aberdeen. This was not to lead to an immediate breakthrough into the first team and he did not feature again for Motherwell until the following season when he appeared as a substitute in home games against Inverness Caledonian Thistle and St Mirren. In January 2007 he joined Scottish Third Division side Stenhousemuir for a month on loan, making a single appearance. Toward the end of the 2006/07 season there was speculation that Coakley's father was interested in buying the club, however this came to nothing and Coakley was released at the end of the season when his contract expired. In total he played around 40 minutes during his 3 substitute appearances. After being released he had a trial with Partick Thistle of the Scottish First Division.

=== Morton ===
However the trial with Partick was unsuccessful and a trial with Scottish First Division side Greenock Morton followed. Failed attempts to sign Paul McGowan from Celtic and Jani Šturm. left them short upfront and Coakley was offered a six-month contract following him scoring in a friendly victory at Raydale Park over Gretna.

Having only made a handful of appearances for Morton, in September 2007 Coakley stepped down a division, going on loan to Alloa Athletic, scoring his first goal for the team in a win against Peterhead. Coakley then went on loan to Stranraer in the Scottish Third Division , and made his debut against Montrose. His loan spell finished after 5 games, with no goals.

=== Alloa ===
He was released by Morton in January 2008 and then played 3 games for Alloa as a trialist before signing a permanent deal with the club until May 2008. He was released at the end of his contract and in June 2008 was signed by Queen's Park manager Gardner Speirs.

=== Queen's Park ===
He made his first appearance for Queen's Park as they lost 2–1 to Partick Thistle in the Challenge Cup. He scored his first goal in a 2–1 win over East Fife on 16 August. Coakley scored a famous goal against Celtic in Queen's Park's 2–1 Scottish Cup loss in February 2009, but failed to build on the goal at Celtic Park and only made two more appearances for the Queen's Park first team before being released in May 2009.

=== Clyde ===
Coakley undertook pre-season training with former team Alloa, however they were unable to meet his wage demands, and in August 2009 he signed a one-year contract with Clyde in the Scottish Second Division. Coakley left the club by mutual consent in October 2009, after only making 5 appearances, deciding to end his football career in the process.

=== Junior Football ===
He returned to football in September 2010 when he signed for Ayrshire junior club Glenafton Athletic.

=== International ===
Coakley has been capped at least three times for Scotland under 18s, against Belgium, Northern Ireland and Malta.
