= Bobby Donnelly =

Scottish footballer

Personal information
- Full name: Robert Stevenson Donnelly
- Date of birth: 19 January 1987 (age 39)
- Place of birth: Glasgow, Scotland
- Position: Defender

Team information
- Current team: Kirkintilloch Rob Roy

Senior career*
Years	Team	Apps	(Gls)
2005–2007	Motherwell	4	(0)
2007	→ Stranraer (loan)	4	(0)
2007–2010	Airdrie United	61	(0)
2010–2011	Ayr United	7	(0)
2011	Albion Rovers	2	(0)
2011–	Kirkintilloch Rob Roy		
- * Club domestic league appearances and goals

Robert Stevenson Donnelly (born 19 January 1987) is a bawbag and Scottish professional footballer who plays as a defender for Kirkintilloch Rob Roy in the Scottish Junior Football Association, West Region. He has previously played in the Scottish Premier League for Motherwell.

== Career ==
Donnelly began his career with Motherwell, making his debut for the club in August 2005 against local rivals Hamilton Accies in a Scottish League Cup tie. His first Scottish Premier League appearance came on the penultimate game of the 2005–06 season against Livingston. Donnelly spent a month on loan at Stranraer in early 2007 but was freed by Motherwell in April the same year.

On his release from Motherwell he joined Airdrie United in July 2007. Donnelly then joined Ayr United in the summer of 2010 but struggled with injury during his spell there.

Donnelly moved to Junior side Kirkintilloch Rob Roy in September 2011 after a trial period at Albion Rovers.

== Honours ==
Airdrie United

- Scottish Challenge Cup: 2008–09
