= Brian Kerr (Scottish footballer) =

Scottish footballer (born 1981)

Personal information
- Date of birth: 12 October 1981 (age 45)
- Place of birth: Bellshill, Scotland
- Position: Midfielder

Senior career*
Years	Team	Apps	(Gls)
2001–2004	Newcastle United	9	(0)
2002	→ Coventry City (loan)	3	(0)
2003	→ Livingston (loan)	13	(0)
2004	→ Coventry City (loan)	9	(0)
2004–2007	Motherwell	79	(5)
2007–2008	Hibernian	25	(1)
2009	Inverness Caledonian Thistle	10	(1)
2009–2010	Dundee	35	(1)
2011–2013	Arbroath	57	(1)
Total		240	(9)

International career
2003–2004	Scotland	3	(0)

Managerial career
- 2017–2018: Albion Rovers
- 2018: East Kilbride
- 2018–2019: Partick Thistle (assistant)
- 2024–2026: St Mirren (assistant)
- 2026-: Aberdeen (assistant)
- * Club domestic league appearances and goals

Brian Kerr (born 12 October 1981) is a Scottish football coach and former player, who is currently assistant manager at Scottish Premiership club Aberdeen.

During his career, Kerr played as a midfielder for Newcastle United, Coventry City, Livingston, Motherwell, Hibernian, Inverness Caledonian Thistle, Dundee and Arbroath. He represented Scotland at senior international level, earning three caps.

Since retiring as a player, Kerr has managed Albion Rovers and East Kilbride.

== Playing career ==
Kerr started his career with Newcastle United, but failed to hold down a regular first team place. Despite this, he won three caps for Scotland under the management of Berti Vogts. When Kerr was released by Newcastle in 2004, he signed for his home town club Motherwell. His career then suffered a major setback when he damaged an anterior cruciate ligament in a pre-season friendly, causing him to be out of football for almost nine months. He finally made his debut for the club against Aberdeen on 9 April 2005. After recovering from his injury, Kerr re-established his place in Motherwell's first-team squad, and he scored his first goal for the club with a spectacular strike in a 4–4 draw with Celtic in July 2005.

In 2007, Kerr left Motherwell and signed a two-year contract with Hibernian. Kerr scored (what proved to be the winner in a 1–0 victory) on his debut for Hibernian against Edinburgh derby rivals Hearts on 6 August 2007. He played regularly under John Collins, but found it harder to hold down a first team place under Mixu Paatelainen and was released on 1 September 2008.

It was reported by BBC Sport in September 2008 that Kerr was in signing talks with Major League Soccer club Toronto FC. Kerr failed to agree terms with Toronto and then had unsuccessful trial periods with Brighton & Hove Albion and Oldham Athletic. Kerr told the Daily Record during January 2009 that he may have to end his playing career due to his failure to find a new club since leaving Hibs. Soon afterwards, however, new Inverness Caledonian Thistle manager Terry Butcher invited Kerr on trial and he was signed on 2 February. He made his debut for Inverness against former side Hibernian in a 2–0 win and scored his first goal against Hamilton. Inverness were relegated on the last day of the season and Kerr was subsequently released by the club.

On 29 June 2009, Kerr signed a contract with Dundee. He scored his first and what turned out to be only goal for Dundee against former club Inverness Caledonian Thistle on 6 March 2010. On 15 October 2010, Kerr had his contract terminated by Dundee due to the club entering administration. Kerr signed for Arbroath in July 2011. At Arbroath he scored once in a 4–2 win over Ayr United. He left the club in 2013.

== Coaching career ==
In June 2016, Kerr was appointed to a coaching position by Albion Rovers. After Darren Young left the club in May 2017, Kerr was appointed first-team manager on 8 May 2017. He had a difficult first season, with Rovers being relegated to Scottish League Two in April 2018, and Kerr decided to leave the club soon afterwards.

On 18 May 2018, Kerr was appointed manager of Lowland League club East Kilbride. Kerr resigned his position as manager on 15 October 2018, to become assistant manager of Partick Thistle under Gary Caldwell. Caldwell and Kerr were sacked by Thistle in September 2019.

In November 2019, Kerr returned to Motherwell as the club's Under-18's coach. He became their assistant manager in 2022, but was sacked along with manager Steven Hammell on 11 February 2023 following a Scottish Cup defeat by Raith Rovers.

In September 2024 Kerr became assistant manager at St Mirren.

== Managerial statistics ==
As of match played 20 October 2018

Team	Nat	From	To	Record				
Team	Nat	From	To	G	W	D	L	Win %
Albion Rovers	(Scotland)	May 2017	May 2018	43	10	9	24	23.26
East Kilbride	(Scotland)	May 2018	October 2018	12	8	3	1	66.67
Total				55	18	12	25	32.73

- A match against Spartans in the 2017–18 Scottish Challenge Cup, which Rovers won on a penalty shootout, was awarded to Spartans because Rovers fielded an unregistered player.

== Honours ==
Dundee

- Scottish Challenge Cup: 2009–10
