= Bob Malcolm =

Scottish footballer (born 1980)

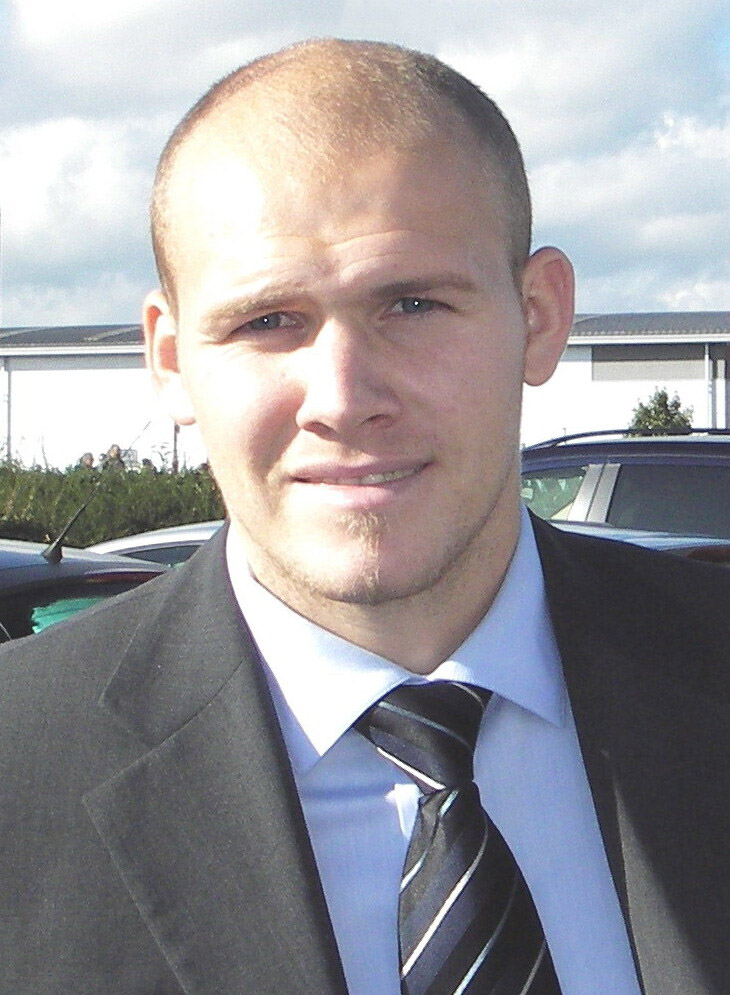
- Malcolm in 2006

Personal information
- Full name: Robert Malcolm
- Date of birth: 12 November 1980 (age 46)
- Place of birth: Glasgow, Scotland
- Height: 1.83 m (6 ft 0 in)
- Positions: Centre-back; defensive midfielder

Youth career
- 1994–1999: Rangers

Senior career*
Years	Team	Apps	(Gls)
1999–2006	Rangers	88	(3)
2006–2008	Derby County	10	(0)
2007–2008	→ Queens Park Rangers (loan)	11	(0)
2008–2009	Motherwell	21	(3)
2009–2010	Brisbane Roar	11	(0)
2010	Dundee	4	(0)
2011	Cowdenbeath	2	(0)
2012–2013	East Fife	3	(0)
Total		150	(6)

International career
2001	Scotland U21	1	(0)
2002–2004	Scotland B	3	(1)

Managerial career
- 2017: Clyde (caretaker)
- * Club domestic league appearances and goals

Robert Malcolm (born 12 November 1980 in Glasgow) is a Scottish former football player and coach.

Malcolm played as a centre-back or defensive midfielder for Rangers, Derby County, Queens Park Rangers (on loan), Motherwell, Brisbane Roar, Dundee and Cowdenbeath and East Fife. He also represented Scotland in under-21 and 'B' team international matches.

Since retiring as a player, Malcolm has worked as a coach. He assisted Barry Ferguson during his time as manager of Blackpool and Clyde, Kelty Hearts and Alloa Athletic. He had a short spell as caretaker manager at Clyde in 2017.

== Playing career ==
=== Rangers ===
He began his career playing for Scottish Premier League team Rangers, either as a centre back or a defensive midfielder. A graduate of the club's youth system, Malcolm played 115 games (three goals) in all competitions across his seven years as a senior player at Rangers, winning four major honours (two league titles, a Scottish Cup and a Scottish League Cup).

In May 2004, Malcolm was fined £5,000 after signing "FTP" (an acronym depicting "Fuck The Pope") alongside an autograph for a fan. Anti-sectarian charity Nil by Mouth made Rangers aware of the incident which took place at a private club function. In November 2004, Malcolm was sent-off from the dug-out at Ibrox Stadium and escorted to the dressing room by two police officers for making what was reported to have been obscene gestures towards fans of rival Scottish club Celtic, during an Old Firm derby. However, he did return to the bench later in the match.

Despite playing 17 times for Rangers during season 2005–06 under Alex McLeish, he was not in the plans of new manager Paul Le Guen for the new season and was left out of the squad's pre-season trip to South Africa. He had been linked with moves to Dundee United, Ipswich Town, Coventry City, Wolverhampton Wanderers, Preston North End and Millwall before being released by Rangers on 31 August 2006.

=== Derby County ===
Malcolm signed for Derby County on 6 September. He played a part in The Rams promotion to the English Premier League, but injuries hampered his progress at the Derby and on 16 November 2007 he joined Championship club Queens Park Rangers on loan until 1 January 2008, where he joined up with ex-Derby teammates Lee Camp and Adam Bolder.

On 28 December 2007, Malcolm was suspended by Derby County after he was charged by police with a drink driving offence, although he was playing for QPR at the time. The charge related to an alleged incident on the M1 motorway in Derbyshire the previous morning. He was bailed to appear before Chesterfield Magistrates Court on 16 January 2008. During this hearing the case was adjourned until 29 January. After the adjournment Malcolm admitted to being unfit to drive through drink and he was subsequently banned from driving. On 31 January 2008 Malcolm had his Derby County contract paid up by manager Paul Jewell, after playing only 14 games for The Rams, with one Premier League appearance in a 6–0 defeat at Liverpool.

=== Motherwell ===
Reports in February 2008 had linked him with a move to FC Dallas, but, after failing a fitness test, he instead opted to join Scottish Premier League side Motherwell on 26 February 2008, signing a contract until the end of the 2007–08 season. Malcolm then signed a further one-year deal with the club on 10 July 2008.

=== Brisbane Roar ===
Malcolm signed for Queensland-based A-League team Brisbane Roar in July 2009 where former Rangers teammates Craig Moore and Charlie Miller played at the time. He was released by the Roar after the team started a rebuilding phase under new coach Ange Postecoglou.

=== Dundee ===
In March 2010, Malcolm moved back to Scotland, with First Division hopefuls Dundee. Having made three appearances for Dundee he was released by the club on 4 May 2010, along with 8 other players.

=== Cowdenbeath ===
Malcolm signed for Cowdenbeath in March 2011. He was released in May 2011 following Cowdenbeath's relegation to the Second Division.

=== East Fife ===
After missing a year through injury, Malcolm trained with East Fife in July 2012. However, ultimately he never played for another senior club. He would make four appearances during the 2012–13 season, which would be the final matches of his playing career.

=== International ===
Malcolm made appearances for both Scotland U21 and Scotland B. He was also called up to the senior Scotland team in February 2003 but was ultimately never capped at that level.

== Coaching career ==
Malcolm was appointed to a coaching position at Blackpool in January 2014, working for his former Rangers teammate Barry Ferguson. In a match against Burnley in April 2014, Malcolm was filmed pushing Blackpool player Stephen Dobbie in the face. Ferguson subsequently admitted that tensions were a "bit high". Blackpool avoided relegation from the Football League Championship, but Ferguson and Malcolm left the club at the end of the 2013–14 season.

Ferguson was appointed manager of Scottish League Two club Clyde and in June 2014 recruited Malcolm to be a coach. Malcolm was promoted to the position of assistant manager at Clyde in August 2014. After Ferguson resigned on 26 February, Malcolm took caretaker charge of two matches.

In October 2017, Malcolm was seen operating an ice cream van in Glasgow's Barlanark neighbourhood, filling in for a relative who owned the operation.

Malcolm was the assistant manager of Kelty Hearts, working under Barry Ferguson, up until 2021, when Ferguson was appointed as manager of Alloa Athletic.

== Statistics ==
=== Playing statistics ===
Season	Club	Games	Goals	Notes
1999–2000	Rangers	3	0	
2000–01	Rangers	9	1	
2001–02	Rangers	8	0	
2002–03	Rangers	33	1	SPL winner and Scottish Cup winner medals
2003–04	Rangers	17	0	
2004–05	Rangers	28	1	SPL winner and Scottish League Cup winner medals
2005–06	Rangers	17	0	
2006–07	Derby County	12	0	Promoted to Premier League
2007–08	Derby County	2	0	
2007–08	Queens Park Rangers	11	0	On loan from Derby County
2007–08	Motherwell	8	0	
2008–09	Motherwell	14	3	
2009–10	Brisbane Roar	11	0	
2009–10	Dundee	3	0	
2010–11	Cowdenbeath	2	0	
2012–13	East Fife	4	0	
Career total		182	6	

=== Managerial statistics ===
As of 28 February 2017

Team	Nat	From	To	Record				
Team	Nat	From	To	G	W	D	L	Win %
Clyde (interim)	Scotland	25 February 2017	2 March 2017	2	0	0	2	0.00
Total				2	0	0	2	0.00

== Honours ==
Rangers

- Scottish Premier League: 2002–03, 2004–05
- Scottish Cup: 2002–03
- Scottish League Cup: 2004–05
