= Martyn Corrigan =

Scottish footballer and manager

Personal information
- Full name: Martyn Alexander Corrigan
- Date of birth: 14 August 1977 (age 49)
- Place of birth: Glasgow, Scotland
- Position: Defender

Senior career*
| Years | Team | Apps | (Gls) |
| 1995–1999 | Falkirk | 41 | (3) |
| 1999–2000 | Jokerit | 13 | (0) |
| 2000 | Falkirk | 0 | (0) |
| 2000–2008 | Motherwell | 243 | (6) |
| 2007 | → Dundee (loan) | 4 | (0) |
| 2008–2009 | Kilmarnock | 8 | (0) |
| 2009 | Ross County | 10 | (0) |
| 2009–2010 | Partick Thistle | 11 | (0) |
| 2010–2011 | Stirling Albion | 22 | (0) |
| 2011–2012 | Stenhousemuir | 19 | (0) |
| Total | | 371 | (9) |

International career
| 2004–2006 | Scotland B | 2 | (0) |

Managerial career
- 2012–2014: Stenhousemuir
- 2014–2016: Stirling Albion (assistant manager)
- 2016: Stirling Albion (caretaker)
- * Club domestic league appearances and goals as of 20:39, 18 July 2012 (UTC)

Martyn Alexander Corrigan (born 14 August 1977) is a Scottish former professional football player and manager.

His playing career saw spells at Falkirk, Jokerit, Motherwell, Dundee, Kilmarnock, Ross County, Partick Thistle, Stirling Albion and Stenhousemuir. Corrigan was then manager of Stenhousemuir for 18 months.

== Playing career ==
Corrigan started his career with Falkirk. He then played in Finland for Jokerit, with whom he won the Finnish Cup in 1999, before rejoining Falkirk in 2000.

Weeks later, Corrigan signed for Motherwell. Naturally a right back, Corrigan can play as a centre back or in midfield. In the 2002–03 season he played all but the final 16 minutes of the last game of the season against Livingston. He became a fans favourite, earning the nickname "Kaiser".

Corrigan signed a new three-year contract in 2006, despite suffering a cruciate ligament injury during Motherwell's final match of the 2005–06 season against Dundee United. After the arrival of Mark McGhee as manager, however, Corrigan was selected less frequently.

After a loan spell at Dundee in October 2007, Corrigan moved to Kilmarnock on 5 January 2008. He was released by Motherwell and made his debut for Kilmarnock later that day against Hearts.

At the end of the January 2009 transfer window, he moved down a division to join First Division Ross County. He then moved to Partick Thistle at the beginning of the 2009–10 season, but was released at the end of the season. He then joined Stirling Albion for the 2010–11 campaign.

=== International ===
Corrigan made 2 appearances for Scotland B.

== Coaching career ==
In May 2011 he rejected a new contract offered by Stirling Albion, opting instead to join Stenhousemuir as player coach. Corrigan was appointed Stenhousemuir manager in July 2012, replacing Davie Irons. He left the club in January 2014.

Corrigan was appointed assistant manager of Stirling Albion in November 2014, working alongside manager Stuart McLaren. After McLaren was sacked in September 2016, Corrigan was given the role of caretaker manager by the Binos, taking charge of the side until a permanent replacement was found, however he left this role in November 2016, without a new manager having been appointed. Martyn now coaches his local side Dunipace FC at youth level with their under 18's.

== Managerial statistics ==
As of 5 November 2016

| Team | Nat | From | To | Record | | | | |
| Team | Nat | From | To | G | W | D | L | Win % |
|---|---|---|---|---|---|---|---|---|
| Stenhousemuir | (Scotland) | June 2012 | January 2014 | 74 | 29 | 20 | 25 | 39.19 |
| Stirling Albion | (Scotland) | September 2016 | November 2016 | 5 | 2 | 2 | 1 | 40.00 |
| Total | | | | 79 | 31 | 22 | 26 | 39.24 |
