= Kenny Connolly =

Scottish footballer

Personal information
- Full name: Kenneth Connolly
- Date of birth: 4 April 1987 (age 39)
- Place of birth: Glasgow, Scotland
- Position: Midfielder

Team information
- Current team: Kirkintilloch Rob Roy

Senior career*
Years	Team	Apps	(Gls)
2004–2008	Motherwell	2	(0)
2009	→ Ayr United (loan)	18	(4)
2009–2010	Ayr United	35	(1)
2010	Clyde	1	(0)
2010–2012	Auchinleck Talbot		
2012–	Kirkintilloch Rob Roy		
- * Club domestic league appearances and goals as of 11:30, 8 March 2013 (UTC)

Kenneth Connolly (born 4 April 1987) is a Scottish footballer, who plays for Kirkintilloch Rob Roy in the Scottish Junior Football Association, West Region. He has previously played in the Scottish Premier League for Motherwell.

== Career ==
Connolly started his career with Motherwell and made his first-team debut in a Scottish Cup tie against Airdrie United on 6 January 2007. He appeared twice in the Scottish Premier League for the club, playing against Dundee United in March and May 2007. A broken leg set Connolly's career back, and despite winning a contract extension in the summer of 2008, he was released during the January 2009 transfer window.

Connolly joined Ayr United from Motherwell on loan on 16 January 2009 and made his debut the following day in a league match away to Stirling Albion. He signed a permanent contract with the club during the summer of 2009.

After his release from Ayr in the summer of 2010, Connolly had a trial period with Clyde but was not offered a contract.

Connolly signed for Junior side Auchinleck Talbot in October 2010 and was part of their 2010–11 Scottish Junior Cup winning team at the end of that season. He moved on to Kirkintilloch Rob Roy in February 2012.
