= Colin Meldrum (footballer, born 1975) =

Scottish footballer and coach

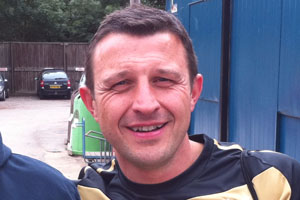

Personal information
- Full name: Colin George Meldrum
- Date of birth: 26 November 1975 (age 50)
- Place of birth: Kilmarnock, Scotland
- Height: 1.78 m (5 ft 10 in)
- Position: Goalkeeper

Team information
- Current team: Celtic U20 (goalkeeping coach)

Youth career
- Kilwinning Rangers

Senior career*
Years	Team	Apps	(Gls)
1994–2004	Kilmarnock	75	(0)
1998	→ Stranraer (loan)	7	(0)
1999	→ Ross County (loan)	2	(0)
2004–2005	Livingston	5	(0)
2005–2006	Forfar Athletic	1	(0)
2006–2007	Motherwell	24	(0)
Total		114	(0)

International career
1996–1997	Scotland U21	6	(0)

Managerial career
- 2021–: Celtic U20 (goalkeeping coach)
- * Club domestic league appearances and goals

Colin George Meldrum (born 26 November 1975) is a Scottish former professional goalkeeper and coach, who previously played for Kilmarnock, Livingston, Forfar Athletic and Motherwell. Whilst at the East Ayrshire club, Meldrum had loan spells at Stranraer and Ross County.

== Career ==
After spending his youth career with Scottish Juniors club Kilwinning Rangers in North Ayrshire, Meldrum then signed for his home-town club Kilmarnock, where he played for a decade from 1994 until 2004, playing in 75 league matches, as he was predominantly the understudy goalkeeper. During the 1998–99 season, Meldrum was sent out on loan to both Ross County (2 league appearances) and Stranraer (7 league appearances). Meldrum signed for West Lothian club Livingston before the start of the 2004–05 season, where he played in only five league matches during his solitary season with the Livi Lions. Meldrum then moved to Station Park to play for Forfar Athletic for the 2005–06 season and played in only one league match. Meldrum then signed for Motherwell for the 2006–07 season where he played in 24 league matches. Before the start of the 2007–08 season Meldrum was appointed as the goalkeeping coach at the Fir Park club, although he continued as a registered player. Meldrum then joined Aberdeen as the Pittodrie club's goalkeeping coach on 8 September 2009 when he replaced Dons legend Jim Leighton. Meldrum then left the Dons along with manager Mark McGhee and assistant manager Scott Leitch on 1 December 2010 after a poor run of results that saw Aberdeen drop down to second bottom in the SPL. Meldrum is currently with Celtic as the Under 20s goalkeeping coach.

== Honours ==
- Scottish Cup: 1996–97
