= Jim Paterson (footballer) =

Scottish footballer and manager

Personal information
- Full name: James Lee Paterson
- Date of birth: 25 September 1979 (age 47)
- Place of birth: Bellshill, Scotland
- Height: 1.75 m (5 ft 9 in)
- Positions: Left back; left winger

Senior career*
Years	Team	Apps	(Gls)
1996–2004	Dundee United	101	(4)
2004–2008	Motherwell	108	(5)
2008–2011	Plymouth Argyle	65	(1)
2010	→ Aberdeen (loan)	7	(0)
2011	Shamrock Rovers	8	(0)
2012–2014	Bristol Rovers	43	(1)
2014	→ Celtic Nation (loan)		
2014–2015	Forfar Athletic	12	(0)
2015	Dunfermline Athletic	6	(0)
2015–2017	Stenhousemuir	15	(0)
Total		365	(11)

International career
1997–2001	Scotland U21	9	(1)

Managerial career
- 2019–2020: East Kilbride (interim)
- * Club domestic league appearances and goals

James Lee Paterson (born 25 September 1979) is a Scottish former professional footballer who played as a left back or left midfielder. He was most recently the interim manager of East Kilbride.

He played for Dundee United, Motherwell, Plymouth Argyle, Aberdeen, Shamrock Rovers, Bristol Rovers, Celtic Nation, Forfar Athletic and Dunfermline Athletic. He is a former Scotland under-21 internationalist, making nine appearances between 1997 and 2001. Paterson recently returned to Motherwell to replace outgoing coach Richard Foster as under 18s coach.

== Career ==
=== Scotland ===
Paterson began his career at Dundee United. His first start for the club came in a pre-season friendly against Wolves in July 1997, with manager Tommy McLean selecting him in recognition of "all his work in the reserves". During his time at United he was unfortunate to break his leg twice in as many years. He left Dundee United in June 2004, agreeing to end his contract a year early.

On 14 July 2004, Paterson signed for Motherwell. He scored his first goal for the club on 24 August 2004, as Motherwell won 3–0 against Greenock Morton in the Scottish League Cup.

On 1 June 2006, Paterson signed a new two-year contract at Motherwell.

=== England & Ireland ===
On 31 January 2008, Paterson moved to Plymouth Argyle on a three-and-a-half-year deal for an undisclosed fee, thought to be around £250,000. He scored his first goal for Pilgrims with an effort from the edge of the box against Southampton on 19 February.

On 1 February 2010, he signed for Aberdeen on loan until the end of the 2009–10 season. On 31 March 2010 Paterson returned to Plymouth Argyle as injury ended his season at Aberdeen.

On 12 August 2010, it was announced that Paterson had been allowed to travel to Greece to negotiate a deal to join Kavala who play in the Greek Premier Division. Paterson, although praised for his professionalism by new Argyle manager Peter Reid, was deemed surplus to requirements at Home Park and has been allowed to leave if he can get a deal. This deal fell through, however, and Paterson again returned to Plymouth.

Released by Plymouth at the end of the season, Paterson sought out other clubs and went on trial with Yeovil in July 2011.

On 31 August 2011, Paterson signed for League of Ireland champions Shamrock Rovers. Paterson made his debut on 3 September in a 2–1 away victory against Dundalk and helped the club win the 2011 League of Ireland championship. He also played in the UEFA Europa League group stage for Rovers. Paterson left Rovers at the end of season and went on trial with St Johnstone in January 2012.

At the end of January 2012, Paterson signed a short-term contract with Bristol Rovers until the end of the season. Having been a regular for Rovers during the season run in, Paterson agreed a new one-year deal, with the option of a further year.

On 9 January 2014, Paterson signed for Northern League Division One club Celtic Nation on loan until the end of the 2013–14 season.

In May 2014, following Bristol Rovers relegation to the Conference Premier, Paterson was one of twelve players released by the club.

=== Return to Scotland ===
On 2 September 2014, Paterson signed for Scottish League One club Forfar Athletic, signing a contract until January 2015.

On 6 January 2015, Paterson signed for Scottish League One club Dunfermline Athletic F.C. until the end of the season in a role that would also see him coaching The Pars under 20's team, alongside Andrew Barrowman. After making six appearances for Dunfermline, Paterson was released by the club at the end of the season. After being a free agent for five months, Paterson signed a short-term contract with Stenhousemuir in October 2015, making his first appearance in a league match against Cowdenbeath. After two years with the side, Paterson retired from football at the end of the 2016–17 season.

== Career statistics ==
As of 1 February 2012

Appearances and goals by club, season and competition
Club	Season	League			National Cup		League Cup		Total	
Club	Season	Division	Apps	Goals	Apps	Goals	Apps	Goals	Apps	Goals
Dundee United	1998–99	Scottish Premier League	15	0	5	0	–		20	0
Dundee United	1999–00	Scottish Premier League	8	1	–		2	0	10	1
Dundee United	2000–01	Scottish Premier League	6	1	–		1	0	7	1
Dundee United	2001–02	Scottish Premier League	28	1	1	0	2	1	31	2
Dundee United	2002–03	Scottish Premier League	33	1	1	0	4	0	38	1
Dundee United	2003–04	Scottish Premier League	16	0	1	0	2	0	19	0
Dundee United	Total		106	4	8	0	11	1	125	5
Motherwell	2004–05	Scottish Premier League	35	3	–		5	1	40	4
Motherwell	2005–06	Scottish Premier League	19	1	–		–		19	1
Motherwell	2006–07	Scottish Premier League	34	1	2	0	2	0	38	1
Motherwell	2007–08	Scottish Premier League	20	0	2	0	3	0	25	0
Motherwell	Total		108	5	4	0	10	1	122	6
Plymouth Argyle	2007–08	Championship	8	1	–		–		8	1
Plymouth Argyle	2008–09	Championship	17	0	–		1	0	18	0
Plymouth Argyle	Total		25	1	0	0	1	0	26	1
Aberdeen	2009–10	Scottish Premier League	1	0	0	0	0	0	1	0
Shamrock Rovers	2011	League of Ireland	8	0	0	0	0	0	8	0
Career total			248	10	12	0	22	2	282	12

== Honours ==
Shamrock Rovers

- League of Ireland: 2011
