= Kevin McBride (footballer) =

Scottish footballer and coach

Personal information
- Date of birth: 14 June 1981 (age 45)
- Place of birth: Bellshill, Scotland
- Position: Defensive midfielder

Youth career
- 2000–2004: Celtic

Senior career*
Years	Team	Apps	(Gls)
2004–2005	Celtic	0	(0)
2004–2005	→ Motherwell (loan)	25	(5)
2005–2007	Motherwell	38	(1)
2007–2008	Darlington	6	(1)
2008–2009	Falkirk	43	(0)
2009–2011	Hibernian	37	(0)
2011	→ Raith Rovers (loan)	7	(0)
2011–2012	Hamilton Academical	6	(0)
2012–2015	Dundee	66	(3)
2015–2016	Airdrieonians	4	(0)
Total		231	(10)

Managerial career
- 2016: Airdrieonians (interim)
- * Club domestic league appearances and goals

Kevin McBride (born 14 June 1981) is a Scottish football coach and former player.

== Career ==
=== Playing ===
McBride started his career with Celtic, but did not make a first team appearance for the club. He moved to Motherwell, initially on loan, and made 63 league appearances for the Fir Park club.

McBride then had a brief spell with Darlington making 6 league appearances and scoring 1 goal. He returned to Scotland with Falkirk in January 2008. McBride had a public dispute with the Falkirk fans towards the end of the 2008–09 season, after the supporters' trust had called for manager John Hughes to be sacked.

McBride was released by Falkirk on 27 June 2009. He then followed Falkirk manager Hughes by signing for Hibernian. He featured in every game for Hibs at the start of the 2009–10 season, forming a midfield partnership with Liam Miller, but was subsequently hampered by a longstanding ankle injury.

On 22 August 2010, McBride was sent off, along with opponent Kyle Lafferty, in a match against Rangers. Manager John Hughes was "bemused" by both red cards. Three weeks later, McBride was temporarily handed the captain's armband, with captain Chris Hogg and vice-captain Ian Murray dropped to the bench for the match against Inverness Caledonian Thistle. McBride lost his place in the side after Colin Calderwood was appointed manager.

On 24 March 2011, it was reported by the Edinburgh Evening News that McBride had joined Raith Rovers on a short-term deal until the end of the season. During his spell at Raith Rovers McBride was advised that his contract with Hibs will not be renewed.

McBride signed for Hamilton Academical on a short-term contract in October 2011. Dundee signed McBride on a short-term contract in March 2012, after a successful trial period at the club. He helped Dundee win the 2013–14 Scottish Championship, scoring two goals in 27 appearances. After three seasons with Dundee, McBride left the club by "mutual consent". In July 2015, he signed for Scottish League One side Airdrieonians.

McBride made the decision to retire from playing at the end of December 2015 to concentrate on a coaching role at Airdrieonians. In May 2016, McBride was promoted to the position of first team coach at Airdrieonians. He was given responsibility for managing first team affairs while Eddie Wolecki Black continued his recovery from a stroke. McBride left this position on 31 October, when the club brought in Gordon Dalziel as director of football and Mark Wilson as first team coach.

On 17 February 2017 it was announced that McBride had joined Raith Rovers as assistant manager. McBride left Raith on 13 May 2017, after they were relegated to League One.

== Managerial statistics ==
As of match played 29 October 2016

Team	From	To	Record				
Team	From	To	G	W	D	L	Win %
Airdrieonians (interim)	May 2016	October 2016	17	7	3	7	41.18
Total			17	7	3	7	41.18
