= 2002–03 Motherwell F.C. season =

Motherwell
2002–03 season
- Chairman: John Boyle
- Manager: Terry Butcher
- Premier League: 12th
- Scottish Cup: Semi-final
- League Cup: Third round
- Top goalscorer: League: James McFadden (13); All: James McFadden (19)
- Highest home attendance: 12,037 vs Celtic; 7 May 2003
- Lowest home attendance: 3,741 vs Dunfermline Athletic; 19 February 2003
- Average home league attendance: 6,096
Home colours

The 2002–03 season was Motherwell's 5th season in the Scottish Premier League, and their 18th consecutive season in the top division of Scottish football. They finished the season in bottom of the league, but were spared relegation as Falkirk, the champions of the 2002–03 Scottish First Division, ground did not meet SPL stadium criteria. They also competed in the Scottish Cup, reaching the Semi-Finals before being defeated by Rangers, and the League Cup, losing to Aberdeen.

== Squad ==
As of match played 24 May 2003

No.	Name	Nationality	Position	Date of birth (age)	Signed from	Signed in	Contract ends	Apps.	Goals
Goalkeepers
1	Stevie Woods	(Scotland)	GK	23 February 1970 (aged 33)	Preston North End	1994			
13	François Dubourdeau	(France)	GK	4 December 1980 (aged 22)	Girondins de Bordeaux	2001		30	0
25	Jamie Ewings	(Scotland)	GK	4 August 1984 (aged 18)	Youth team	2002		0	0
Defenders
2	Martyn Corrigan	(Scotland)	DF	14 August 1977 (aged 25)	Falkirk	2000		135	2
3	Steven Hammell	(Scotland)	DF	18 February 1982 (aged 21)	Youth team	1999		125	1
14	David Partridge	(Wales)	DF	26 November 1978 (aged 24)	Dundee United	2002		38	1
15	Tony Vaughan	(England)	DF	11 October 1975 (aged 27)	loan from Nottingham Forest	2003	2003	15	1
16	David Cowan	(England)	DF	5 March 1982 (aged 21)	Newcastle United	2002		21	0
18	Brian Dempsie	(Scotland)	DF	4 February 1983 (aged 20)	Youth team	1999		2	0
22	William Kinniburgh	(Scotland)	DF	8 September 1984 (aged 18)	Youth team	2000		17	1
23	John Crawley	(Scotland)	DF	20 March 1984 (aged 19)	Youth team	2002		0	0
24	Andrew Bell	(Scotland)	DF	4 October 1984 (aged 18)	Youth team	2002		0	0
29	Paul Quinn	(Scotland)	DF	21 July 1985 (aged 17)	Youth team	2002		4	0
32	Barry Neville	(Scotland)	DF	18 April 1985 (aged 18)	Youth team	2002		0	0
33	Chris Higgins	(Scotland)	DF	4 July 1985 (aged 17)	Youth team	2002		0	0
37	Marc Fitzpatrick	(Scotland)	DF	11 May 1986 (aged 17)	Youth team	2002		0	0
39	Graeme Mathie	(Scotland)	DF	17 October 1982 (aged 20)	Bournemouth	2002		0	0
Midfielders
4	Keith Lasley	(Scotland)	MF	21 September 1979 (aged 23)	Youth team	1999		72	5
5	Dougie Ramsay	(Scotland)	MF	26 April 1979 (aged 24)	Youth team	1997		42	2
6	Stephen Pearson	(Scotland)	MF	2 October 1982 (aged 20)	Youth team	2000		69	8
7	Derek Adams	(Scotland)	MF	25 June 1975 (aged 27)	Ross County	1998		143	14
8	Scott Leitch	(Scotland)	MF	6 October 1969 (aged 33)	Swindon Town	2000		87	1
19	David Clarke	(Scotland)	MF	22 June 1983 (aged 19)	Youth team	1999		2	0
20	Kevin MacDonald	(Scotland)	MF	5 February 1983 (aged 20)	Youth team	1999		1	0
21	Shaun Fagan	(Scotland)	MF	22 March 1984 (aged 19)	Youth team	1999		23	2
26	David Black	(Scotland)	MF		Youth team	2002		0	0
30	Kevin Barkey	(Scotland)	MF	5 February 1985 (aged 18)	Youth team	2002		0	0
34	Brian McCandie	(Scotland)	MF	4 May 1985 (aged 18)	Youth team	2002		0	0
35	Ryan Grant	(Scotland)	MF	5 January 1985 (aged 18)	Youth team	2002		0	0
44	Kenny Wright	(Scotland)	MF	1 August 1985 (aged 17)	Youth team	2002		2	0
40	Ross Ballantyne	(Scotland)	MF	27 January 1984 (aged 19)	Youth team	2002		1	0
Forwards
9	Dirk Lehmann	(Germany)	FW	16 August 1971 (aged 31)	Brighton & Hove Albion	2002		48	11
10	James McFadden	(Scotland)	FW	14 April 1983 (aged 20)	Youth team	2000		67	28
11	Khaled Kemas	(Algeria)	FW	1 September 1979 (aged 23)	Dundee	2003		7	1
17	Steven Craig	(Scotland)	FW	5 February 1981 (aged 22)	Falkirk	2003		15	3
27	David Clarkson	(Scotland)	FW	10 September 1985 (aged 17)	Youth team	2002		23	3
31	Andy Scott	(Scotland)	FW	30 January 1985 (aged 18)	Youth team	2002		1	0
36	Ryan Grant	(Scotland)	FW	5 January 1985 (aged 18)	Youth team	2002		0	0
38	Darren Jack	(Scotland)	FW	9 August 1983 (aged 19)	Ross County	2002		2	0
41	Richard Offiong	(England)	FW	17 December 1983 (aged 19)	loan from Newcastle United	2003		10	0
Out on loan
40	Iain Russell	(Scotland)	FW	14 November 1982 (aged 20)	Rangers	2002		5	0
Left during the season
12	Daniel Sengewald	(Germany)	DF	16 December 1975 (aged 27)	Royal Antwerp	2002		7	0
17	Steven Ferguson	(Scotland)	FW	1 April 1982 (aged 21)	loan from Tottenham Hotspur	2002	2003	21	2

== Transfers ==
=== In ===
Date	Position	Nationality	Name	From	Fee	Ref.
19 July 2002	DF	(Wales)	David Partridge	Dundee United	Free	
19 July 2002	DF	(Germany)	Daniel Sengewald	Royal Antwerp	Free	
19 July 2002	FW	(Algeria)	Khaled Kemas	Dundee	Free	
1 August 2002	DF	(England)	David Cowan	Newcastle United	Free	
9 September 2002	FW	(Scotland)	Iain Russell	Rangers		
27 January 2003	FW	(Scotland)	Steven Craig	Falkirk	Free	

=== Loans in ===
Date from	Position	Nationality	Name	From	Date to	Ref.
July 2002	FW	(Scotland)	Steven Ferguson	Tottenham Hotspur	January 2003	
31 January 2003	DF	(England)	Tony Vaughan	Nottingham Forest	End of Season	
31 January 2003	FW	(England)	Richard Offiong	Newcastle United	End of Season	

=== Out ===
Date	Position	Nationality	Name	To	Fee	Ref.
July 2002	DF	(France)	Éric Deloumeaux	Aberdeen		
July 2002	MF	(Northern Ireland)	Stuart Elliott	Hull City	£230,000	

=== Loans out ===
Date from	Position	Nationality	Name	To	Date to	Ref.
31 January 2002	FW	(Scotland)	Iain Russell	Dumbarton	11 May 2003	

=== Released ===
Date	Position	Nationality	Name	Joined	Date	Ref.
7 February 2003	DF	(Germany)	Daniel Sengewald	Bonner SC		
29 May 2003	GK	(France)	François Dubourdeau	Kilmarnock	19 August 2003	
May 2003	MF	(Scotland)	Dougie Ramsay	Ayr United	1 August 2003	
May 2003	DF	(Scotland)	Brian Dempsie	Retired		
May 2003	FW	(Germany)	Dirk Lehmann	Yokohama	July 2003	

== Competitions ==
=== Overview ===
Competition	First match	Last match	Starting round	Final position	Record							
Competition	First match	Last match	Starting round	Final position	Pld	W	D	L	GF	GA	GD	Win %
Premier League	3 August 2002	24 May 2003	Matchday 1	12th	38	7	7	24	45	71	−26	18.42
Scottish Cup	25 January 2003	19 April 2003	Third Round	Semifinal	4	3	0	1	10	4	+6	75.00
League Cup	24 September 2002	6 November 2002	Second Round	Third Round	2	1	0	1	3	3	+0	50.00
Total					44	11	7	26	58	78	−20	25.00

Last updated: 24 May 2003
Source: Competitions

=== Premier League ===
==== Results summary ====
Overall								Home						Away					
Pld	W	D	L	GF	GA	GD	Pts	W	D	L	GF	GA	GD	W	D	L	GF	GA	GD
38	7	7	24	45	71	−26	28	6	4	9	31	34	−3	1	3	15	14	37	−23

Source: See Results

==== Results by round ====
Round	1	2	3	4	5	6	7	8	9	10	11	12	13	14	15	16	17	18	19	20	21	22	23	24	25	26	27	28	29	30	31	32	33	34	35	36	37	38
Ground	A	H	A	A	H	H	A	A	H	H	A	H	A	H	H	A	A	H	A	A	H	A	H	A	A	H	H	A	H	A	A	H	A	H	H	A	H	H
Result	L	D	W	D	L	W	L	L	D	L	L	L	L	L	L	L	L	W	D	D	W	L	D	L	L	W	W	L	L	L	L	L	L	D	L	L	L	W
Position	10	9	5	6	6	4	7	7	8	9	9	10	12	12	12	12	12	12	12	12	11	11	11	11	12	11	11	11	11	12	12	12	12	12	12	12	12	12

Source: See Results
A = Away; H = Home; W = Win; D = Draw; L = Loss

==== Results ====
3 August 2002 1	Livingston	3–2	Motherwell	Livingston
15:00 BST (UTC+1)	Rubio 8'; Zárate 34', 47'; Andrews (yellow card); Camacho (yellow card); Dadi (yellow card)		Leitch 50' (yellow card); Lehmann 64'; Partridge (yellow card); Ramsay (yellow card); Pearson (yellow card)	Stadium: Almondvale Stadium; Attendance: 7,124; Referee: John Rowbotham

10 August 2002 2	Motherwell	1–1	Partick Thistle	Motherwell
15:00 BST (UTC+1)	Pearson 83'; Hammell (yellow card); Lasley (yellow card); Lehmann (yellow card)		Burns 81' (yellow card)	Stadium: Fir Park; Attendance: 6,000; Referee: Craig Thomson

17 August 2002 3	Kilmarnock	0–3	Motherwell	Kilmarnock
15:00 BST (UTC+1)	Locke (red card) 50'; McLaren (yellow card) (yellow-red card) 54'; Sanjuán (yellow card) (yellow-red card) 85'; Hessey (yellow card); McSwegan (yellow card); Boyd (yellow card)		Ramsay 67'; Pearson 84' (yellow card); McFadden 86' (yellow card); Partridge (yellow card); Kinniburgh (yellow card)	Stadium: Rugby Park; Attendance: 6,164; Referee: Alan Freeland

25 August 2002 4	Dundee United	1–1	Motherwell	Dundee
15:00 BST (UTC+1)	McIntyre 46'	Report	Pearson 3'; Leitch (yellow card); McFadden (yellow card)	Stadium: Tannadice; Attendance: 3,345; Referee: Ian Fyfe

31 August 2002 5	Motherwell	0–2	Hibernian	Motherwell
15:00 BST (UTC+1)	Partridge (yellow card); Ramsay (yellow card); Lasley (yellow card)		Townsley 15', 72' (yellow card); Zambernardi (yellow card); Murray (yellow card); Mátyus (yellow card)	Stadium: Fir Park; Attendance: 5,888; Referee: Kenny Clark

10 September 2002 6	Motherwell	2–1	Celtic	Motherwell
19:45 BST (UTC+1)	Fagan 77' (yellow card); McFadden 80' (pen.) (yellow card); Adams (yellow card); Leitch (yellow card); Lasley (yellow card)	Report	Hartson 88'; Laursen (yellow card)	Stadium: Fir Park; Attendance: 8,448; Referee: Willie Young

15 September 2002 7	Heart of Midlothian	4–2	Motherwell	Edinburgh
15:00 BST (UTC+1)	De Vries 35'; Kirk 64', 77' (yellow card); Boyack 74'; Severin (yellow card)		Lehmann 12'; McFadden 28'; Partridge (yellow card); Sengewald (yellow card); Hammell (yellow card); Adams (yellow card)	Stadium: Tynecastle; Attendance: 8,578; Referee: Hugh Dallas

21 September 2002 8	Dunfermline Athletic	1–0	Motherwell	Dunfermline
15:00 BST (UTC+1)	Bullen 74'; Wilson (yellow card)		Leitch (yellow card); McFadden (yellow card)	Stadium: East End Park; Attendance: 4,987; Referee: Charlie Richmond

28 September 2002 9	Motherwell	1–1	Dundee	Motherwell
15:00 BST (UTC+1)	McFadden 56'; Partridge (yellow card); Pearson (yellow card)		Lovell 14' (yellow card); Caballero (yellow card)	Stadium: Fir Park; Attendance: 4,025; Referee: Dougie McDonald

5 October 2002 10	Motherwell	1–2	Aberdeen	Motherwell
15:00 BST (UTC+1)	McFadden 41' (pen.) (yellow card); Hammell (yellow card); Ferguson (yellow card)		Young 46'; Deloumeaux 83'; McGuire (yellow card); McAllister (yellow card); Bisconti (yellow card); Fabiano (yellow card)	Stadium: Fir Park; Attendance: 6,014; Referee: Kevin Toner

19 October 2002 11	Rangers	3–0	Motherwell	Glasgow
15:00 BST (UTC+1)	Amoruso 2'; Løvenkrands 72' de Boer 90'		Partridge (red card) 77'; Lasley (yellow card)	Stadium: Ibrox Stadium; Attendance: 49,376; Referee: Alan Freeland

26 October 2002 12	Motherwell	1–5	Livingston	Motherwell
15:00 BST (UTC+1)	Kemas 79'; Pearson (yellow card)	Report	Makel 9'; Mamam 48', 58'; Bingham 81'; Xausa 90'; Rubio (yellow card); Bollan (yellow card)	Stadium: Fir Park; Attendance: 4,342; Referee: Mike McCurry

2 November 2002 13	Partick Thistle	2–0	Motherwell	Glasgow
15:00 GMT (UTC)	Hardie 30' (yellow card); Burns 52'		Leitch (yellow card) (yellow-red card) 72'; Kinniburgh (yellow card); Pearson (yellow card); McFadden (yellow card)	Stadium: Firhill Stadium; Attendance: 5,405; Referee: Tom Brown

9 November 2002 14	Motherwell	0–1	Kilmarnock	Motherwell
15:00 GMT (UTC)	MacDonald (yellow card)		Boyd 90+1'; Innes (yellow card); Dillon (yellow card)	Stadium: Fir Park; Attendance: 4,439; Referee: Kenny Clark

16 November 2002 15	Motherwell	1–2	Dundee United	Motherwell
15:00 GMT (UTC)	Lehmann 82'	Report	Hamilton 1', 24'	Stadium: Fir Park; Attendance: 5,381; Referee: Iain Brines

23 November 2002 16	Hibernian	3–1	Motherwell	Edinburgh
15:00 GMT (UTC)	Paatelainen 59'; McManus 64'; Brebner (red card) 87'; O'Neil 90' (pen.)		Ferguson 47'; Sengewald (yellow card) 49' (yellow-red card) 56'; Pearson (red card) 88'; Partridge (red card) 88'; Adams (yellow card); McFadden (yellow card)	Stadium: Easter Road; Attendance: 8,859; Referee: Dougie McDonald

1 December 2002 17	Celtic	3–1	Motherwell	Glasgow
19:45 GMT (UTC)	Larsson 53'; Leitch 67' (o.g.); Valgaeren 72'; Lambert (yellow card)	Report	Lehmann 74'; Fagan (yellow card) 55' (yellow-red card) 80'; Dempsie (yellow card)	Stadium: Celtic Park; Attendance: 56,733; Referee: John Rowbotham

4 December 2002 18	Motherwell	6–1	Heart of Midlothian	Motherwell
15:00 GMT (UTC)	Pearson 15'; McFadden 19' (pen.), 26'; Adams 36'; Corrigan 66'; Ferguson 90'; Sengewald (yellow card)	Motherwell [ BBC]	Kirk 51'; McKenna (yellow card)	Stadium: Fir Park; Attendance: 4,114; Referee: Stuart Dougal

7 December 2002 19	Aberdeen	1–1	Motherwell	Aberdeen
15:00 GMT (UTC)	D.Young 30'; Rutkiewicz (yellow card) (yellow-red card) 83'; Anderson (yellow card); Deloumeaux (yellow card); Young (yellow card)		Kinniburgh 59'; Fagan (yellow card); Ferguson (yellow card); McFadden (yellow card)	Stadium: Pittodrie Stadium; Attendance: 9,569; Referee: Craig Thomson

14 December 2002 20	Dundee	1–1	Motherwell	Dundee
15:00 GMT (UTC)	Sara 35'; Wilkie (yellow card)		Lehmann 74'; Hammell (yellow card); Fagan (yellow card)	Stadium: Dens Park; Attendance: 5,527; Referee: Mike McCurry

26 December 2002 21	Motherwell	1–0	Rangers	Motherwell
15:00 GMT (UTC)	McFadden 65' (yellow card); Adams (yellow card)	Report	Ricksen (yellow card); Moore (yellow card); Mols (yellow card)	Stadium: Fir Park; Attendance: 11,234; Referee: Willie Young

29 December 2002 22	Livingston	1–0	Motherwell	Livingston
15:00 GMT (UTC)	Zárate 87'; Bingham (yellow card); Xausa (yellow card)	https://news.bbc.co.uk/sport2/hi/football/scot_prem/2609413.stm BBC	Hammell (yellow card); Adams (yellow card); Pearson (yellow card); McFadden (yellow card)	Stadium: Almondvale Stadium; Attendance: 7,216; Referee: Craig Thomson

2 January 2003 23	Motherwell	2–2	Partick Thistle	Motherwell
15:00 GMT (UTC)	Clarkson 9'; McFadden (yellow card) 21' (yellow-red card) 37'; Partridge 77'; Hammell (yellow card); Kinniburgh (yellow card); Leitch (yellow card); Pearson (yellow card); Lehmann (yellow card)		Burns 19', 49' (pen.); Buchan (yellow card); Archibald (yellow card); Hardie (yellow card); Britton (yellow card)	Stadium: Fir Park; Attendance: 6,262; Referee: Ian Fyfe

29 January 2003 24	Kilmarnock	1–0	Motherwell	Kilmarnock
19:45 GMT (UTC)	Boyd 81' (pen.)		Dubourdeau (red card) 88'; Kinniburgh (yellow card)	Stadium: Rugby Park; Attendance: 4,457; Referee: John Rowbotham

1 February 2003 25	Dundee United	2–1	Motherwell	Dundee
15:00 GMT (UTC)	Tod 5'; Combe (red card) 18'; Miller 68' (yellow card); Bollan (yellow card); Dodds (yellow card)	Report	Adams 20' (pen.); Partridge (yellow card); Leitch (yellow card); Craig (yellow card)	Stadium: Tannadice; Attendance: 6,672; Referee: David Somers

8 February 2003 26	Motherwell	2–0	Hibernian	Motherwell
15:00 GMT (UTC)	Clarkson 31'; Fagan 41' (yellow card); Cowan (yellow card); Adams (yellow card)		O'Connor 71'; Colgan (yellow card); Zambernardi (yellow card); Murray (yellow card); Jack (yellow card); O'Neil (yellow card); Townsley (yellow card)	Stadium: Fir Park; Attendance: 4,999; Referee: Charlie Richmond

19 February 2003 27	Motherwell	2–1	Dunfermline Athletic	Motherwell
19:45 GMT (UTC)	Pearson 19'; Craig 50'; Adams (yellow card)		Crawford 52'; Nicholson (yellow card)	Stadium: Fir Park; Attendance: 3,741; Referee: David Somers

1 March 2003 28	Heart of Midlothian	2–1	Motherwell	Edinburgh
15:00 GMT (UTC)	McKenna 30'; Simmons 71'; Maybury (yellow card)		Lasley 46'; Vaughan (yellow card); Ramsay (yellow card); Pearson (yellow card)	Stadium: Tynecastle; Attendance: 11,704; Referee: Mike McCurry

8 March 2003 29	Motherwell	0–1	Aberdeen	Motherwell
15:00 GMT (UTC)	Pearson (red card) 90'; Partridge (yellow card); Lehmann (yellow card)		Sheerin 7' (pen.); Young (yellow card); Clark (yellow card); Mackie (yellow card)	Stadium: Fir Park; Attendance: 5,636; Referee: Dougie McDonald

19 March 2003 30	Rangers	2–0	Motherwell	Glasgow
19:45 BST (UTC+1)	Ferguson 18'; Løvenkrands 46' (yellow card); Muscat (yellow card)	Report	Vaughan (yellow card); Cowan (yellow card)	Stadium: Ibrox Stadium; Attendance: 49,420; Referee: Hugh Dallas

5 April 2003 31	Dunfermline Athletic	3–0	Motherwell	Dunfermline
15:00 BST (UTC+1)	Hampshire 18'; Nicholson 50'; Hunt 77'; Wilson (yellow card)		Vaughan (red card) 37'; Leitch (yellow card); Lasley (yellow card)	Stadium: East End Park; Attendance: 4,086; Referee: David Somers

12 April 2003 32	Motherwell	1–2	Dundee	Motherwell
15:00 BST (UTC+1)	McFadden 77'		Burchill 2'; Milne 24'; Smith (yellow card); Rae (yellow card)	Stadium: Fir Park; Attendance: 4,693; Referee: John Underhill

26 April 2003 33	Partick Thistle	3–0	Motherwell	Glasgow
15:00 BST (UTC+1)	Burns 29'; Britton 68', 90'; Whyte (yellow card)		Partridge (yellow card); Lehmann (yellow card); Craig (yellow card)	Stadium: Firhill Stadium; Attendance: 4,870; Referee: Iain Brines

3 May 2003 34	Motherwell	2–2	Dundee United	Motherwell
15:00 BST (UTC+1)	Pearson 11'; Vaughan 85' (yellow card); Adams (yellow card)	Report	Miller 49' (yellow card); McIntyre 81'; McCracken (yellow card); Tod (yellow card); Easton (yellow card)	Stadium: Fir Park; Attendance: 9,056; Referee: Hugh Dallas

7 May 2003 35	Motherwell	0–4	Celtic	Motherwell
19:45 BST (UTC+1)	Adams (red card) 31'; Partridge (yellow card); Corrigan (yellow card); Vaughan (yellow card); McFadden (yellow card)	Report	Petrov 36', 56'; Lambert 61', 65'; Lennon (yellow card)	Stadium: Fir Park; Attendance: 12,037; Referee: Dougie McDonald

10 May 2003 36	Hibernian	1–0	Motherwell	Edinburgh
15:00 BST (UTC+1)	Brebner 66' (pen.) (yellow card); Fenwick (yellow card); Jack (yellow card)		Ramsay (yellow card); Lehmann (yellow card)	Stadium: Easter Road; Attendance: 7,809; Referee: Willie Young

17 May 2003 37	Motherwell	2–3	Aberdeen	Motherwell
15:00 BST (UTC+1)	Clarkson 16'; McFadden 84' (pen.)		Hinds 19'; Deloumeaux 28'; Sheerin 34'; Tosh (yellow card)	Stadium: Fir Park; Attendance: 4,731; Referee: John Rowbotham

24 May 2003 38	Motherwell	6–2	Livingston	Motherwell
15:00 BST (UTC+1)	Lasley 30', 90' (yellow card); Craig 57'; McFadden 64', 74' (pen.), 75' (yellow card)	Report	Makel 16'; McMenamin 54' (yellow card); McNamee (yellow card)	Stadium: Fir Park; Attendance: 4,790; Referee: Dougie McDonald

==== Table ====
Pos	Team	Pld	W	D	L	GF	GA	GD	Pts	Qualification or relegation (Note: Teams played each other three times (33 matches), before the league split into two groups (the top six and the bottom six) for the last five matches.)
8	Aberdeen	38	13	10	15	41	54	−13	49	
9	Livingston	38	9	8	21	48	62	−14	35	
10	Partick Thistle	38	8	11	19	37	58	−21	35	
11	Dundee United	38	7	11	20	35	68	−33	32	
12	Motherwell	38	7	7	24	45	71	−26	28	Spared from relegation (Note: As the First Division champions Falkirk did not have a suitable ground for the SPL, bottom club Motherwell were spared from relegation.)

Source: Scottish Professional Football League
Rules for classification: 1) Points; 2) Goal difference; 3) Goals scored

=== Scottish Cup ===
25 January 2003 Third Round	Kilmarnock	0–1	Motherwell	Kilmarnock
GMT (UTC)	Innes (yellow card) (yellow-red card) 52'; Fowler (yellow card); Dillon (yellow card); McLaren (yellow card)		McFadden 35' (pen.) (yellow card); Clarkson (yellow card)	Stadium: Rugby Park; Attendance: 6,882; Referee: John Underhill

22 February 2003 Fourth Round	Clyde	0–2	Motherwell	Cumbernauld
GMT (UTC)			McFadden 41', 77'; Partridge (yellow card); Vaughan (yellow card)	Stadium: Broadwood Stadium; Attendance: 5,032; Referee: Kenny Clark

22 March 2003 Quarterfinal	Stranraer	0–4	Motherwell	Stranraer
GMT (UTC)			Wright 54' (o.g.); McFadden 54'; Adams 59'; Lehmann 87'	Stadium: Stair Park; Attendance: 4,500; Referee: Dougie McDonald

19 April 2003 Semifinal	Rangers	4–3	Motherwell	Glasgow
BST (UTC+1)	Konterman 2'; Mols 56' (yellow card); Amoruso 60'; Partridge 73' (o.g.); Moore (yellow card)		Craig 15'; McFadden 27' (yellow card); Adams 90' (yellow card); Vaughan (yellow card); Pearson (yellow card); Offiong (yellow card)	Stadium: Hampden Park; Attendance: 29,352; Referee: Mike McCurry

=== League Cup ===
24 September 2002 Second Round	East Fife	0–2	Motherwell	Methil
BST (UTC+1)			Lehmann 29'; McFadden 66'	Stadium: Bayview Stadium; Attendance: 970; Referee: Craig Thomson

6 November 2002 Third Round	Aberdeen	3–1	Motherwell	Aberdeen
GMT (UTC)	Mike 23'; Deloumeaux 24'; Michie 43'		Adams 41'	Stadium: Pittodrie Stadium; Attendance: 6,557; Referee: John Rowbotham

== Squad statistics ==
As of match played 24 May 2003

=== Appearances ===
No.	Pos	Nat	Player	Total		Premier League		Scottish Cup		League Cup	
No.	Pos	Nat	Player	Apps	Goals	Apps	Goals	Apps	Goals	Apps	Goals
1	GK	(Scotland) SCO	Stevie Woods	19	0	16+1	0	0	0	2	0
2	DF	(Scotland) SCO	Martyn Corrigan	44	1	38	1	4	0	2	0
3	DF	(Scotland) SCO	Steven Hammell	43	0	37	0	4	0	2	0
4	MF	(Scotland) SCO	Keith Lasley	29	3	21+3	3	2+1	0	2	0
5	MF	(Scotland) SCO	Dougie Ramsay	23	1	16+4	1	1	0	1+1	0
6	MF	(Scotland) SCO	Stephen Pearson	34	6	29	6	4	0	1	0
7	MF	(Scotland) SCO	Derek Adams	38	5	32	2	4	2	2	1
8	MF	(Scotland) SCO	Scott Leitch	31	1	26	1	3	0	2	0
9	FW	(Germany) GER	Dirk Lehmann	37	7	27+5	5	1+2	1	2	1
10	FW	(Scotland) SCO	James McFadden	35	19	29+1	13	4	5	1	1
11	FW	(Algeria) ALG	Khaled Kemas	7	1	4+2	1	0	0	1	0
13	GK	(France) FRA	François Dubourdeau	26	0	22	0	4	0	0	0
14	DF	(Wales) WAL	David Partridge	38	1	32	1	4	0	2	0
15	DF	(England) ENG	Tony Vaughan	15	1	12	1	3	0	0	0
16	DF	(England) ENG	David Cowan	21	0	15+1	0	0+3	0	1+1	0
17	FW	(Scotland) SCO	Steven Craig	15	3	8+5	2	2	1	0	0
18	DF	(Scotland) SCO	Brian Dempsie	1	0	1	0	0	0	0	0
19	MF	(Scotland) SCO	David Clarke	1	0	0+1	0	0	0	0	0
20	MF	(Scotland) SCO	Kevin McDonald	9	0	4+4	0	0	0	0+1	0
21	MF	(Scotland) SCO	Shaun Fagan	21	2	8+10	2	1+2	0	0	0
22	DF	(Scotland) SCO	William Kinniburgh	16	1	11+4	1	1	0	0	0
27	FW	(Scotland) SCO	David Clarkson	23	3	13+6	3	2+2	0	0	0
28	MF	(Scotland) SCO	Kenny Wright	1	0	0+1	0	0	0	0	0
29	DF	(Scotland) SCO	Paul Quinn	4	0	3+1	0	0	0	0	0
31	FW	(Scotland) SCO	Andy Scott	1	0	0+1	0	0	0	0	0
38	FW	(Scotland) SCO	Darren Jack	2	0	0+2	0	0	0	0	0
40	MF	(Scotland) SCO	Ross Ballantyne	1	0	0+1	0	0	0	0	0
41	FW	(England) ENG	Richard Offiong	10	0	0+9	0	0+1	0	0	0
Players away on loan:
40	FW	(Scotland) SCO	Iain Russell	5	0	0+5	0	0	0	0	0
Players who appeared for Motherwell but left during the season:
12	DF	(Germany) GER	Daniel Sengewald	7	0	6+1	0	0	0	0	0
17	FW	(Scotland) SCO	Steven Ferguson	21	2	8+11	2	0	0	1+1	0

=== Goal scorers ===
Ranking	Position	Nation	Number	Name	Premier League	Scottish Cup	League Cup	Total
1	FW	(Scotland)	10	James McFadden	13	5	1	19
2	FW	(Germany)	9	Dirk Lehmann	5	1	1	7
3	MF	(Scotland)	6	Stephen Pearson	6	0	0	6
4	MF	(Scotland)	7	Derek Adams	2	2	1	5
5	FW	(Scotland)	27	David Clarkson	3	0	0	3
5	MF	(Scotland)	4	Keith Lasley	3	0	0	3
5	FW	(Scotland)	17	Steven Craig	2	1	0	3
8	MF	(Scotland)	21	Shaun Fagan	2	0	0	2
8	FW	(Scotland)	17	Steven Ferguson	2	0	0	2
8	MF	(Scotland)	8	Scott Leitch	1	1	0	2
11	DF	(Scotland)	2	Martyn Corrigan	1	0	0	1
11	FW	(Algeria)	11	Khaled Kemas	1	0	0	1
11	DF	(Scotland)	22	William Kinniburgh	1	0	0	1
11	DF	(Wales)	5	Dougie Ramsay	1	0	0	1
11	DF	(England)	15	Tony Vaughan	1	0	0	1
11				Own goal	1	0	0	1
TOTALS					45	9	3	57

=== Clean sheets ===
Ranking	Position	Nation	Number	Name	Premier League	Scottish Cup	League Cup	Total
1	GK	(France)	13	François Dubourdeau	2	3	0	5
2	GK	(Scotland)	1	Stevie Woods	1	0	1	2
TOTALS					3	3	1	7

=== Disciplinary record ===
Number	Nation	Position	Name	Premier League		Scottish Cup		League Cup		Total	
Number	Nation	Position	Name	Yellow card	Red card	Yellow card	Red card	Yellow card	Red card	Yellow card	Red card
2	(Scotland)	DF	Martyn Corrigan	1	0	0	0	0	0	1	0
3	(Scotland)	DF	Steven Hammell	6	0	0	0	0	0	6	0
4	(Scotland)	MF	Keith Lasley	6	0	0	0	0	0	6	0
5	(Scotland)	MF	Dougie Ramsay	4	0	0	0	0	0	4	0
6	(Scotland)	MF	Stephen Pearson	9	2	1	0	0	0	10	2
7	(Scotland)	MF	Derek Adams	8	1	1	0	0	0	9	1
8	(Scotland)	MF	Scott Leitch	9	1	0	0	0	0	9	1
9	(Germany)	FW	Dirk Lehmann	5	0	0	0	0	0	5	0
10	(Scotland)	FW	James McFadden	14	1	2	0	0	0	16	1
13	(France)	GK	François Dubourdeau	0	1	0	0	0	0	0	1
14	(Wales)	DF	David Partridge	9	2	1	0	0	0	10	2
15	(England)	DF	Tony Vaughan	4	1	2	0	0	0	6	1
16	(Scotland)	DF	David Cowan	2	0	0	0	0	0	2	0
17	(Scotland)	FW	Steven Craig	3	0	0	0	0	0	3	0
18	(Scotland)	DF	Brian Dempsie	1	0	0	0	0	0	1	0
20	(Scotland)	MF	Kevin MacDonald	1	0	0	0	0	0	1	0
21	(Scotland)	MF	Shaun Fagan	6	1	0	0	0	0	6	1
22	(Scotland)	DF	William Kinniburgh	4	0	0	0	0	0	4	0
27	(Scotland)	FW	David Clarkson	0	0	1	0	0	0	1	0
41	(England)	FW	Richard Offiong	0	0	1	0	0	0	1	0
Players who left Motherwell during the season:
12	(Germany)	DF	Daniel Sengewald	4	1	0	0	0	0	4	1
17	(Scotland)	FW	Steven Ferguson	2	0	0	0	0	0	2	0
			TOTALS	98	11	9	0	0	0	107	11

== See also ==
- List of Motherwell F.C. seasons
