= 2003–04 Motherwell F.C. season =

Motherwell
2003–04 season
- Chairman: John Boyle
- Manager: Terry Butcher
- Premier League: 6th
- Scottish Cup: Quarter-finals
- League Cup: Second Round
- Top goalscorer: League: David Clarkson (12); All: David Clarkson (14)
- Highest home attendance: 10,824 vs Rangers; 19 October 2003
- Lowest home attendance: 3,920 vs Dunfermline Athletic; 15 April 2004
- Average home league attendance: 6,229
Home colours	Away colours

The 2003–04 season was Motherwell's 6th season in the Scottish Premier League, and their 19th consecutive season in the top division of Scottish football.

== Squad ==
As of match played 16 May 2004

No.	Name	Nationality	Position	Date of birth (age)	Signed from	Signed in	Contract ends	Apps.	Goals
Goalkeepers
1	Gordon Marshall	(Scotland)	GK	19 April 1964 (aged 40)	Kilmarnock	2003		37	0
15	Barry John Corr	(Scotland)	GK	13 January 1981 (aged 23)	Celtic	2003	2004	5	0
25	Jamie Ewings	(Scotland)	GK	4 August 1984 (aged 19)	Youth team	2002		0	0
30	Andrew Reid	(Scotland)	GK	3 August 1985 (aged 18)	Nottingham Forest	2003		0	0
47	Dougie Calder	(Scotland)	GK	1 February 1986 (aged 18)	Hamilton Academical	2003		0	0
Defenders
2	Martyn Corrigan	(Scotland)	DF	14 August 1977 (aged 26)	Falkirk	2000		177	3
3	Steven Hammell	(Scotland)	DF	18 February 1982 (aged 22)	Youth team	1999		166	2
5	Stephen Craigan	(Northern Ireland)	DF	29 October 1976 (aged 27)	Partick Thistle	2003		67	3
6	Gary Bollan	(Scotland)	DF	24 March 1973 (aged 31)	Dundee United	2004		4	0
14	David Partridge	(Wales)	DF	26 November 1978 (aged 25)	Dundee United	2002		54	1
16	David Cowan	(England)	DF	5 March 1982 (aged 22)	Newcastle United	2002		22	0
19	Paul Quinn	(Scotland)	DF	21 July 1985 (aged 18)	Youth team	2002		33	0
22	William Kinniburgh	(Scotland)	DF	8 September 1984 (aged 19)	Youth team	2000		18	1
23	Graeme Mathie	(Scotland)	DF	17 October 1982 (aged 21)	Bournemouth	2002		0	0
24	Ross Ballantyne	(Scotland)	DF	27 January 1984 (aged 20)	Youth team	2002		1	0
29	Barry Neville	(Scotland)	DF	18 April 1985 (aged 19)	Youth team	2002		0	0
31	Chris Higgins	(Scotland)	DF	4 July 1985 (aged 18)	Youth team	2002		0	0
36	Bobby McColl	(Scotland)	DF	21 April 1986 (aged 18)	Aberdeen	2003		0	0
37	Mark Cameron	(Scotland)	DF	7 February 1987 (aged 17)	Youth team	2003		0	0
38	Bobby Donnelly	(Scotland)	DF	19 January 1987 (aged 17)	Youth team	2003		0	0
41	Mark Quinn	(Scotland)	DF	13 May 1987 (aged 17)	Youth team	2003		0	0
42	John McStay	(Scotland)	DF	10 July 1987 (aged 16)	Celtic	2003		0	0
44	David Keogh	(Scotland)	DF	29 August 1986 (aged 17)	Youth team	2003		0	0
Midfielders
4	Keith Lasley	(Scotland)	MF	21 September 1979 (aged 24)	Youth team	1999		109	9
7	Derek Adams	(Scotland)	MF	25 June 1975 (aged 28)	Ross County	1998		178	23
8	Scott Leitch	(Scotland)	MF	6 October 1969 (aged 34)	Swindon Town	2000		109	1
9	Jason Dair	(Scotland)	MF	15 June 1974 (aged 29)	Youth team	2003	2004	32	2
10	Phil O'Donnell	(Scotland)	MF	25 March 1972 (aged 32)	Sheffield Wednesday	2004		156	17
20	Kevin MacDonald	(Scotland)	MF	5 February 1983 (aged 21)	Youth team	1999		5	0
21	Shaun Fagan	(Scotland)	MF	22 March 1984 (aged 20)	Youth team	1999		38	2
27	Kevin Barkey	(Scotland)	MF	5 February 1985 (aged 18)	Youth team	2002		0	0
32	Brian McCandie	(Scotland)	MF	4 May 1985 (aged 19)	Youth team	2002		0	0
35	Marc Fitzpatrick	(Scotland)	MF	11 May 1986 (aged 18)	Youth team	2002		2	0
39	Kenneth Connolly	(Scotland)	MF	18 April 1987 (aged 17)	Youth team	2003		0	0
40	Stephen Maguire	(Scotland)	MF	14 February 1987 (aged 17)	Youth team	2003		0	0
Forwards
11	Alex Burns	(Scotland)	FW	4 August 1973 (aged 30)	Partick Thistle	2003			
12	Scott McDonald	(Australia)	MF	21 August 1983 (aged 20)	Wimbledon	2004	2004	18	2
17	Steven Craig	(Scotland)	FW	5 February 1981 (aged 23)	Falkirk	2003		40	7
18	David Clarkson	(Scotland)	FW	10 September 1985 (aged 18)	Youth team	2002	2006	65	17
26	Kenny Wright	(Scotland)	FW	1 August 1985 (aged 18)	Youth team	2002		17	1
28	Andy Scott	(Scotland)	FW	30 January 1985 (aged 19)	Youth team	2002		1	0
33	Ryan Grant	(Scotland)	FW	5 January 1985 (aged 19)	Youth team	2002		0	0
34	James Reilly	(Scotland)	FW	7 February 1986 (aged 18)	Youth team	2003		0	0
45	Adam Coakley	(Scotland)	FW	19 October 1987 (aged 16)	Youth team	2003		0	0
46	Ryan Russell	(Scotland)	FW	9 April 1987 (aged 17)	Youth team	2003		0	0
Left during the season
6	Stephen Pearson	(Scotland)	MF	2 October 1982 (aged 21)	Youth team	2000		88	13
10	James McFadden	(Scotland)	FW	14 April 1983 (aged 21)	Youth team	2000		70	31

== Transfers ==
=== In ===
Date	Position	Nationality	Name	From	Fee	Ref.
5 June 2003	GK	(Scotland)	Gordon Marshall	Kilmarnock	Free	
5 June 2003	FW	(Scotland)	Alex Burns	Partick Thistle	Free	
5 June 2003	DF	(Northern Ireland)	Stephen Craigan	Partick Thistle	Free	
2 August 2003	GK	(Scotland)	Barry John Corr	Celtic	Free	
5 September 2003	MF	(Scotland)	Jason Dair	Dunfermline Athletic	Free	
January 2004	FW	(Australia)	Scott McDonald	Wimbledon	Free	
9 January 2004	MF	(Scotland)	Phil O'Donnell	Sheffield Wednesday	Free	
14 January 2004	DF	(Scotland)	Gary Bollan	Dundee United	Free	

=== Out ===
Date	Position	Nationality	Name	To	Fee	Ref.
2 July 2003	GK	(Scotland)	Stevie Woods	St Mirren		
July 2003	FW	(Algeria)	Khaled Kemas	Les Lilas		
July 2003	FW	(Scotland)	Iain Russell	Dumbarton		
1 September 2003	FW	(Scotland)	James McFadden	Everton	£1.25 million	
9 January 2004	MF	(Scotland)	Stephen Pearson	Celtic	£350,000	

=== Released ===
Date	Position	Nationality	Name	Joined	Date	Ref.
May 2004	DF	(Scotland)	Gary Bollan	Clyde	6 August 2004	
May 2004	FW	(Scotland)	Andy Scott	Bellshill Athletic		

== Competitions ==
=== Overview ===
Competition	First match	Last match	Starting round	Final position	Record							
Competition	First match	Last match	Starting round	Final position	Pld	W	D	L	GF	GA	GD	Win %
Premier League	9 August 2003	16 May 2004	Matchday 1	6th	38	12	10	16	42	49	−7	31.58
Scottish Cup	10 January 2004	6 March 2004	Third Round	Quarterfinal	3	2	0	1	6	3	+3	66.67
League Cup	23 September 2003	23 September 2003	Second Round	Second Round	1	0	1	0	3	3	+0	0.00
Total					42	14	11	17	51	55	−4	33.33

Last updated: 16 May 2004
Source: Competitions

=== Premier League ===
==== Results summary ====
Overall								Home						Away					
Pld	W	D	L	GF	GA	GD	Pts	W	D	L	GF	GA	GD	W	D	L	GF	GA	GD
38	12	10	16	42	49	−7	46	7	7	5	25	22	+3	5	3	11	17	27	−10

Source: Fir Park Corner

==== Results by round ====
Round	1	2	3	4	5	6	7	8	9	10	11	12	13	14	15	16	17	18	19	20	21	22	23	24	25	26	27	28	29	30	31	32	33	34	35	36	37	38
Ground	H	A	H	H	A	A	H	A	H	A	A	H	H	A	A	H	H	A	H	A	A	H	A	H	H	H	A	A	A	H	H	H	A	A	A	H	H	A
Result	L	L	W	D	W	L	D	W	D	W	W	D	D	L	L	L	L	D	W	L	L	W	L	W	W	W	D	D	L	L	D	W	W	L	L	L	D	L
Position	11	11	8	7	5	7	8	6	6	5	4	4	4	4	5	5	6	6	5	6	7	5	6	5	5	5	5	5	6	6	6	5	5	5	5	6	6	6

Source: Fir Park Corner
A = Away; H = Home; W = Win; D = Draw; L = Loss

==== Results ====
9 August 2003 1	Motherwell	0–3	Dundee	Motherwell
15:00 BST		Report	Rae 23'; Wilkie 43'; Smith 84'	Stadium: Fir Park; Attendance: 6,812; Referee: John Underhill

16 August 2003 2	Livingston	1–0	Motherwell	Livingston
15:00 BST	Lilley 78'	Report; BBC		Stadium: Almondvale Stadium; Attendance: 5,316; Referee: C Thomson

23 August 2003 3	Motherwell	2–1	Kilmarnock	Motherwell
15:00 BST	McFadden 66' (pen.); Pearson 90'	Report	Dindeleux 76'	Stadium: Fir Park; Attendance: 5,087; Referee: Ian Fyfe

30 August 2003 4	Motherwell	2–2	Partick Thistle	Motherwell
15:00 BST	McFadden 9', 69'	Report	Britton 26'; Taylor 82'	Stadium: Fir Park; Attendance: 6,193; Referee: John Rowbotham

13 September 2003 5	Hibernian	0–2	Motherwell	Edinburgh
15:00 BST		Report	Clarkson 45', 75'	Stadium: Easter Road; Attendance: 8,387; Referee: Kenny Clark

20 September 2003 6	Celtic	3–0	Motherwell	Glasgow
15:00 BST	Larsson 47'; Sutton 64'; Maloney 70'	Report; BBC		Stadium: Celtic Park; Attendance: 58,013; Referee: Iain Brines

27 September 2003 7	Motherwell	1–1	Heart of Midlothian	Motherwell
15:00 BST	Adams 29'	Report	Hartley 45'	Stadium: Fir Park; Attendance: 5,888; Referee: Charlie Richmond

4 October 2003 8	Dundee United	0–2	Motherwell	Dundee
15:00 BST		Report; BBC	Adams 22' (pen.), 90'	Stadium: Tannadice Park; Attendance: 6,194; Referee: Hugh Dallas

19 October 2003 9	Motherwell	1–1	Rangers	Motherwell
15:00 BST	Pearson 25'	Report; BBC	Arveladze 15'	Stadium: Fir Park; Attendance: 10,824; Referee: Dougie McDonald

1 November 2003 10	Aberdeen	0–3	Motherwell	Aberdeen
15:00 GMT		Report; Aberdeen	Craig 10'; Pearson 77'; Lasley 90'	Stadium: Pittodrie Stadium; Attendance: 9,895; Referee: Kevin Toner

8 November 2003 11	Dundee	0–1	Motherwell	Dundee
15:00 GMT		BBC	Craig 52'	Stadium: Dens Park; Attendance: 6,374; Referee: Iain Brines

22 November 2003 12	Motherwell	1–1	Livingston	Motherwell
15:00 GMT	Clarkson 28'	Report; BBC	Lilley 39'	Stadium: Fir Park; Attendance: 6,357; Referee: John Underhill

25 November 2003 13	Motherwell	2–2	Dunfermline Athletic	Motherwell
19:45 GMT	Pearson 70'; Corrigan 90'	Report	Crawford 15'; Brewster 39'	Stadium: Fir Park; Attendance: 4,220; Referee: Chris Foy

29 November 2003 14	Kilmarnock	2–0	Motherwell	Kilmarnock
15:00 GMT	Canero 13'; Boyd 60'	Report		Stadium: Rugby Park; Attendance: 6,320; Referee: Michael McCurry

7 December 2003 15	Partick Thistle	1–0	Motherwell	Glasgow
15:00 GMT	McBride 59'	Report		Stadium: Firhill Stadium; Attendance: 4,124; Referee: Tom Brown

13 December 2003 16	Motherwell	0–1	Hibernian	Motherwell
15:00 GMT		Report	Riordan 90'	Stadium: Fir Park; Attendance: 4,533; Referee: Craig Thomson

21 December 2003 17	Motherwell	0–2	Celtic	Motherwell
15:00 GMT		Report; BBC	Hartson 3'; Thompson 71'	Stadium: Fir Park; Attendance: 10,513; Referee: John Underhill

27 December 2003 18	Heart of Midlothian	0–0	Motherwell	Edinburgh
12:30 GMT		Report		Stadium: Tynecastle Stadium; Attendance: 10,046; Referee: John Rowbotham

3 January 2004 19	Motherwell	3–1	Dundee United	Motherwell
15:00 GMT	Clarkson 60', 68', 90'	Report; BBC	Wilson 15'	Stadium: Fir Park; Attendance: 5,549; Referee: Charlie Richmond

17 January 2004 20	Rangers	1–0	Motherwell	Glasgow
15:00 GMT	Arveladze 82'	Report; BBC		Stadium: Ibrox; Attendance: 48,925; Referee: C Thompson

24 January 2004 21	Dunfermline Athletic	1–0	Motherwell	Dunfermline
15:00 GMT	Young 73'	Report		Stadium: East End Park; Attendance: 5,270; Referee: Dougie McDonald

11 February 2004 22	Motherwell	5–3	Dundee	Motherwell
19:45 GMT	Lasley 15'; Dair 18', 73'; Clarkson 51'; Burns 62'	Report	Barrett 11', 28'; Novo 58'	Stadium: Fir Park; Attendance: 4,327; Referee: John Rowbotham

14 February 2004 23	Livingston	3–1	Motherwell	Livingston
15:00 GMT	McAllister 3'; Lilley 29'; Fernandez 45'	Report; Livingston	Adams 90'	Stadium: Almondvale Stadium; Attendance: 3,492; Referee: Chris Foy

21 February 2004 24	Motherwell	1–0	Kilmarnock	Motherwell
15:00 GMT	Quinn 15'	Report		Stadium: Fir Park; Attendance: 5,163; Referee: Dougie McDonald

24 February 2004 25	Motherwell	1–0	Aberdeen	Motherwell
19:45 GMT	Wright 84'	Report; Aberdeen		Stadium: Fir Park; Attendance: 5,225; Referee: Calum Murray

28 February 2004 26	Motherwell	3–0	Partick Thistle	Motherwell
15:00 GMT	Hammell 1'; Clarkson 52'; Adams 80'	Report		Stadium: Fir Park; Attendance: 5,814; Referee: C Thompson

14 March 2004 27	Celtic	1–1	Motherwell	Glasgow
13:30 GMT	Larsson 70'	Report; BBC	Adams 26'	Stadium: Celtic Park; Attendance: 47,563; Referee: Tom Brown

24 March 2004 28	Hibernian	3–3	Motherwell	Edinburgh
19:45 GMT	Nicol 6'; Reid 37'; Riordan 62' (pen.)	Report	Lasley 46'; Adams 60' (pen.); Doumbe 80' (o.g.)	Stadium: Easter Road; Attendance: 5,670; Referee: Alan Freeland

27 March 2004 29	Dundee United	1–0	Motherwell	Dundee
15:00 GMT	Scotland 66'	Report; BBC		Stadium: Tannadice Park; Attendance: 7,585; Referee: Stuart Dougal

4 April 2004 30	Motherwell	0–1	Rangers	Motherwell
15:00 BST		Report; BBC	Hughes 44'	Stadium: Fir Park; Attendance: 8,967; Referee: John Rowbotham

15 April 2004 31	Motherwell	1–1	Heart of Midlothian	Motherwell
19:45 BST	Clarkson 61'	Report	Wyness 27'	Stadium: Fir Park; Attendance: 5,500; Referee: C Melville

15 April 2004 32	Motherwell	1–0	Dunfermline Athletic	Motherwell
19:45 BST	Adams 10' (pen.)	Report		Stadium: Fir Park; Attendance: 3,920; Referee: Calum Murray

18 April 2004 33	Aberdeen	0–2	Motherwell	Aberdeen
15:00 BST		Report; Aberdeen	Burns 61'; Craig 90'	Stadium: Pittodrie Stadium; Attendance: 7,246; Referee: Steve Conroy

24 April 2004 34	Dunfermline Athletic	3–0	Motherwell	Dunfermline
15:00 BST	Nicholson 36'; Dempsey 52'; Young 74'	Report		Stadium: East End Park; Attendance: 4,290; Referee: John Underhill

1 May 2004 35	Rangers	4–0	Motherwell	Glasgow
15:00 BST	Arteta 45'; Ross 47'; Namouchi 51'; Thompson 55'	Report; BBC		Stadium: Ibrox; Attendance: 47,579; Referee: Stuart Dougal

8 May 2004 36	Motherwell	0–1	Dundee United	Motherwell
19:45 BST		Report; BBC	Wilson 52'	Stadium: Fir Park; Attendance: 5,722; Referee: A Freeland

12 May 2004 37	Motherwell	1–1	Celtic	Motherwell
19:45 BST	Clarkson 64'	Report; BBC	Beattie 71'	Stadium: Fir Park; Attendance: 7,749; Referee: John Rowbotham

16 May 2004 38	Heart of Midlothian	3–2	Motherwell	Edinburgh
15:00 BST	Wyness 5', 68'; McKenna 75'	Report	McDonald 37'; Clarkson 45'	Stadium: Tynecastle Stadium; Attendance: 11,619; Referee: Iain Brines

==== Table ====
Pos	Team	Pld	W	D	L	GF	GA	GD	Pts	Qualification or relegation (Note: Teams played each other three times (33 matches), before the league split into two groups (the top six and the bottom six) for the last five matches.)
4	Dunfermline Athletic	38	14	11	13	45	52	−7	53	Qualification for the UEFA Cup first round (Note: As Celtic, the 2003–04 Scottish Cup winners, qualified for the UEFA Champions League via their league position, the place in the UEFA Cup was passed onto Dunfermline Athletic, the cup runners-up.)
5	Dundee United	38	13	10	15	47	60	−13	49	
6	Motherwell	38	12	10	16	42	49	−7	46	
7	Dundee	38	12	10	16	48	57	−9	46	
8	Hibernian	38	11	11	16	41	60	−19	44	Qualification for the UEFA Intertoto Cup second round (Note: Hibernian qualified for the 2004 UEFA Intertoto Cup as the highest placed team to apply to participate in the competition.)

Source: Scottish Professional Football League
Rules for classification: 1) Points; 2) Goal difference; 3) Goals scored

=== Scottish Cup ===
10 January 2004 Third Round	St Johnstone	0–3	Motherwell	Perth
15:00 GMT		Report	Clarkson 24', 32'; McDonald 90'	Stadium: McDiarmid Park; Attendance: 4,090; Referee: Kevin Toner

7 February 2004 Fourth Round	Motherwell	3–2	Queen of the South	Motherwell
15:00 GMT	Adams 3' (pen.); Burns 18', 45'	Report	O'Connor 65', 69'	Stadium: Fir Park; Attendance: 8,101; Referee: Michael McCurry

6 March 2004 Quarter-finals	Motherwell	0–1	Inverness Caledonian Thistle	Motherwell
15:00 GMT		Report	Wilson 10'	Stadium: Fir Park; Attendance: 7,930; Referee: Kenny Clark

=== League Cup ===
23 September 2003 Second Round	Forfar Athletic	3–3 (a.e.t.) (4–2 p)	Motherwell	Forfar
19:45 BST	Henderson 30'; Tosh 51', 54'	Report	Craig 3'; Lasley 55'; Pearson 60'	Stadium: Station Park; Attendance: 1,110

== Squad statistics ==
As of match played 16 May 2004

=== Appearances ===
No.	Pos	Nat	Player	Total		Premier League		Scottish Cup		League Cup	
No.	Pos	Nat	Player	Apps	Goals	Apps	Goals	Apps	Goals	Apps	Goals
1	GK	(Scotland) SCO	Gordon Marshall	37	0	33	0	3	0	1	0
2	DF	(Scotland) SCO	Martyn Corrigan	42	1	38	1	3	0	1	0
3	DF	(Scotland) SCO	Steven Hammell	41	1	37	1	3	0	1	0
4	MF	(Scotland) SCO	Keith Lasley	37	4	33	3	3	0	1	1
5	DF	(Northern Ireland) NIR	Stephen Craigan	37	3	36	3	0	0	1	0
6	DF	(Scotland) SCO	Gary Bollan	4	0	1+2	0	0+1	0	0	0
7	FW	(Scotland) SCO	Derek Adams	35	9	31	8	3	1	1	0
8	MF	(Scotland) SCO	Scott Leitch	22	0	20	0	1	0	1	0
9	FW	(Scotland) SCO	Jason Dair	32	2	19+10	2	2	0	0+1	0
10	MF	(Scotland) SCO	Phil O'Donnell	12	0	7+2	0	1+2	0	0	0
11	MF	(Scotland) SCO	Alex Burns	36	4	29+4	2	3	2	0	0
12	FW	(Australia) AUS	Scott McDonald	18	2	10+5	1	1+2	1	0	0
14	DF	(Wales) WAL	David Partridge	16	0	15	0	0	0	1	0
15	GK	(Scotland) SCO	Barry John Corr	5	0	5	0	0	0	0	0
16	DF	(Scotland) SCO	David Cowan	1	0	0+1	0	0	0	0	0
17	FW	(England) ENG	Steven Craig	25	4	16+8	3	0	0	1	1
18	FW	(Scotland) SCO	David Clarkson	42	14	32+6	12	3	2	1	0
19	DF	(Scotland) SCO	Paul Quinn	29	0	24+2	0	3	0	0	0
20	FW	(Scotland) SCO	Kevin MacDonald	4	0	1+3	0	0	0	0	0
21	MF	(Scotland) SCO	Shaun Fagan	15	0	9+4	0	1+1	0	0	0
22	DF	(Scotland) SCO	William Kinniburgh	1	0	0+1	0	0	0	0	0
26	FW	(Scotland) SCO	Kenny Wright	15	1	2+11	1	0+1	0	0+1	0
35	MF	(Scotland) SCO	Marc Fitzpatrick	2	0	1+1	0	0	0	0	0
Players who appeared for Motherwell but left during the season:
6	MF	(Scotland) SCO	Stephen Pearson	19	5	17+1	4	0	0	1	1
10	MF	(Scotland) SCO	James McFadden	3	3	2+1	3	0	0	0	0

=== Goal scorers ===
Ranking	Position	Nation	Number	Name	Premier League	Scottish Cup	League Cup	Total
1	FW	(Scotland)	18	David Clarkson	12	2	0	14
2	FW	(Scotland)	7	Derek Adams	8	1	0	9
3	MF	(Scotland)	6	Stephen Pearson	4	1	0	5
4	DF	(Scotland)	17	Steven Craig	3	0	1	4
4	MF	(Scotland)	4	Keith Lasley	3	0	1	4
6	DF	(Northern Ireland)	5	Stephen Craigan	3	0	0	3
6	FW	(Scotland)	10	James McFadden	3	0	0	3
8	FW	(Scotland)	9	Jason Dair	2	0	0	2
8				Own goal	2	0	0	2
8	FW	(Australia)	12	Scott McDonald	1	1	0	2
11	DF	(Scotland)	2	Martyn Corrigan	1	0	0	1
11	DF	(Scotland)	3	Steven Hammell	1	0	0	1
11	FW	(Scotland)	26	Kenny Wright	0	0	1	1
				TOTALS	55	6	3	64

=== Clean sheets ===
Ranking	Position	Nation	Number	Name	Premier League	Scottish Cup	League Cup	Total
1	GK	(Scotland)	1	Gordon Marshall	9	1	0	10
2	GK	(Scotland)	15	Barry John Corr	1	0	0	1
				TOTALS	10	1	0	11

=== Disciplinary record ===
Nation	Position	Number	Name	Premier League		Scottish Cup		League Cup		Total	
Nation	Position	Number	Name	Booked	Sent off (straight red)	Booked	Sent off (straight red)	Booked	Sent off (straight red)	Booked	Sent off (straight red)
(Scotland)	DF	2	Martyn Corrigan	4	0	0	0	0	0	4	0
(Scotland)	DF	3	Steven Hammell	5	0	1	0	0	0	6	0
(Scotland)	MF	4	Keith Lasley	6	0	0	0	0	0	6	0
(Northern Ireland)	DF	5	Stephen Craigan	4	0	0	0	1	0	5	0
(Scotland)	FW	7	Derek Adams	3	0	0	0	0	0	3	0
(Scotland)	MF	8	Scott Leitch	5	0	0	0	0	0	5	0
(Scotland)	FW	9	Jason Dair	2	0	0	0	0	0	2	0
(Scotland)	FW	11	Alex Burns	3	0	0	0	0	0	3	0
(England)	FW	17	Steven Craig	3	0	0	0	0	0	3	0
(Scotland)	FW	18	David Clarkson	4	0	0	0	0	0	4	0
(Scotland)	DF	19	Paul Quinn	2	0	0	0	0	0	2	0
(Scotland)	MF	21	Shaun Fagan	1	0	0	0	0	0	1	0
(Scotland)	DF	22	William Kinniburgh	1	0	0	0	0	0	1	0
Players who left Motherwell during the season:
(Scotland)	MF	6	Stephen Pearson	1	1	0	0	0	0	1	1
(Scotland)	FW	10	James McFadden	1	0	0	0	0	0	1	0
			TOTALS	44	1	1	0	1	0	46	1

== See also ==
- List of Motherwell F.C. seasons
