= 2004–05 Motherwell F.C. season =

Motherwell
2004–05 season
- Chairman: John Boyle
- Manager: Terry Butcher
- Premier League: 6th
- Scottish Cup: Third round
- League Cup: Final
- Top goalscorer: League: Scott McDonald (15); All: Scott McDonald (15)
- Highest home attendance: 12,994 vs Celtic; 21 May 2005
- Lowest home attendance: 4,267 vs Inverness C.T. 18 December 2004
- Average home league attendance: 6,960
Home colours	Away colours

The 2004–05 season was Motherwell's 7th season in the Scottish Premier League, and their 20th consecutive season in the top division of Scottish football.

== Season events ==
On 29 June, Motherwell announced the signing of Brian Kerr on a free transfer from Newcastle United, to a one-year contract.

On 14 July, Motherwell announced the signing of Jim Paterson on a free transfer from Dundee United, to a two-year contract.

On 8 January, Motherwell announced the signing of Kevin McBride on a permanent deal from Celtic after spending the first half of the season on loan at the club, whilst Alex Burns left the club to join Clyde on loan for the remainder of the season.

On 27 January, Motherwell announced the signing of Jim Hamilton from Livingston on a free transfer, with Hamilton signing a contract until the summer of 2007.

On 31 March, Motherwell announced the signing of free-agent Gerry Britton on a contract until the end of the season.

== Squad ==
As of match played 21 May 2005

No.	Name	Nationality	Position	Date of birth (age)	Signed from	Signed in	Contract ends	Apps.	Goals
Goalkeepers
1	Gordon Marshall	(Scotland)	GK	19 April 1964 (aged 41)	Kilmarnock	2003		76	0
15	Barry John Corr	(Scotland)	GK	13 January 1981 (aged 24)	Celtic	2003		11	0
25	Jamie Ewings	(Scotland)	GK	4 August 1984 (aged 20)	Youth team	2002		0	0
35	Dougie Calder	(Scotland)	GK	1 February 1986 (aged 19)	Hamilton Academical	2003		0	0
41	Peter Alexiou	(Scotland)	GK	7 July 1987 (aged 17)	Youth team	2004		0	0
Defenders
2	Martyn Corrigan	(Scotland)	DF	14 August 1977 (aged 27)	Falkirk	2000		209	5
3	Steven Hammell	(Scotland)	DF	18 February 1982 (aged 23)	Youth team	1999		204	2
5	Stephen Craigan	(Northern Ireland)	DF	29 October 1976 (aged 28)	Partick Thistle	2003		110	7
14	David Partridge	(Wales)	DF	26 November 1978 (aged 26)	Dundee United	2002		86	3
18	Jim Paterson	(Scotland)	DF	25 September 1979 (aged 25)	Dundee United	2004	2006	40	4
19	Paul Quinn	(Scotland)	DF	21 July 1985 (aged 19)	Youth team	2002		59	0
22	William Kinniburgh	(Scotland)	DF	8 September 1984 (aged 20)	Youth team	2000		34	1
23	Chris Higgins	(Scotland)	DF	4 July 1985 (aged 19)	Youth team	2002		0	0
26	Mark Cameron	(Scotland)	DF	7 February 1987 (aged 18)	Youth team	2003		0	0
27	Bobby Donnelly	(Scotland)	DF	19 January 1987 (aged 18)	Youth team	2003		0	0
30	Mark Quinn	(Scotland)	DF	13 May 1987 (aged 18)	Youth team	2003		0	0
31	John McStay	(Scotland)	DF	10 July 1987 (aged 17)	Celtic	2003		0	0
32	David Keogh	(Scotland)	DF	29 August 1986 (aged 18)	Youth team	2003		3	0
36	William Soutar	(Scotland)	DF	12 July 1987 (aged 17)	Youth team	2004		0	0
38	John Grant	(Scotland)	DF	25 August 1987 (aged 17)	Youth team	2004		0	0
40	Mark Reynolds	(Scotland)	DF	7 May 1987 (aged 18)	Youth team	2004		0	0
42	John Kane	(Scotland)	DF	8 June 1987 (aged 17)	Hibernian	2005		0	0
Midfielders
4	Brian Kerr	(Scotland)	MF	12 October 1981 (aged 23)	Newcastle United	2004	2005	8	0
8	Scott Leitch	(Scotland)	MF	6 October 1969 (aged 35)	Swindon Town	2000		143	1
10	Phil O'Donnell	(Scotland)	MF	25 March 1972 (aged 33)	Sheffield Wednesday	2004		179	22
17	Kevin McBride	(Scotland)	MF	14 June 1981 (aged 23)	Celtic	2005		30	7
21	Shaun Fagan	(Scotland)	MF	22 March 1984 (aged 21)	Youth team	1999		65	2
24	Marc Fitzpatrick	(Scotland)	MF	11 May 1986 (aged 19)	Youth team	2002		31	2
27	Kenny Connolly	(Scotland)	MF	4 April 1987 (aged 18)	Youth team	2004		0	0
29	Stephen Maguire	(Scotland)	MF	14 February 1987 (aged 18)	Youth team	2003		0	0
37	Darren Smith	(Scotland)	MF	27 March 1988 (aged 17)	Youth team	2004		1	0
39	Alex Donnelly	(Scotland)	MF	22 March 1988 (aged 17)	Youth team	2003		0	0
Forwards
6	Gerry Britton	(Scotland)	FW	20 October 1970 (aged 34)	Unattached	2005	2005	3	0
7	Scott McDonald	(Australia)	FW	21 August 1983 (aged 21)	Wimbledon	2004		50	17
9	Richie Foran	(Republic of Ireland)	FW	16 June 1980 (aged 24)	Carlisle United	2004		41	9
12	David Clarkson	(Scotland)	FW	10 September 1985 (aged 19)	Youth team	2002	2006	106	20
16	Jim Hamilton	(Scotland)	FW	9 February 1976 (aged 29)	Livingston	2005	2007	14	2
20	Kenny Wright	(Scotland)	FW	1 August 1985 (aged 19)	Youth team	2002		25	2
33	Adam Coakley	(Scotland)	FW	19 October 1987 (aged 17)	Youth team	2003		0	0
34	Ryan Russell	(Scotland)	FW	9 April 1987 (aged 18)	Youth team	2003		0	0
Away on loan
11	Alex Burns	(Scotland)	FW	4 August 1973 (aged 31)	Partick Thistle	2003			
Left during the season
16	David Cowan	(England)	DF	5 March 1982 (aged 23)	Newcastle United	2002		22	0

== Transfers ==
=== In ===
Date	Position	Nationality	Name	From	Fee	Ref.
16 June 2004	FW	(Republic of Ireland)	Richie Foran	Carlisle United	Free	
29 June 2004	MF	(Scotland)	Brian Kerr	Newcastle United	Free	
14 July 2004	DF	(Scotland)	Jim Paterson	Dundee United	Free	
8 January 2005	MF	(Scotland)	Kevin McBride	Celtic	Undisclosed	
27 January 2005	FW	(Scotland)	Jim Hamilton	Livingston	Free	
31 March 2005	FW	(Scotland)	Gerry Britton	Partick Thistle	Free	

=== Loans in ===
Date from	Position	Nationality	Name	From	Date to	Ref.
10 August 2004	MF	(Scotland)	Kevin McBride	Celtic	8 January 2005	

=== Out ===
Date	Position	Nationality	Name	To	Fee	Ref.
1 June 2004	FW	(Scotland)	Steven Craig	Aberdeen	Free	
3 June 2004	MF	(Scotland)	Keith Lasley	Plymouth Argyle	Free	
16 June 2004	MF	(Scotland)	Jason Dair	Livingston	Free	
1 July 2004	MF	(Scotland)	Derek Adams	Aberdeen	Free	
21 January 2005	DF	(England)	David Cowan	St Johnstone		

=== Loans out ===
Date from	Position	Nationality	Name	To	Date to	Ref.
6 January 2005	FW	(Scotland)	Alex Burns	Clyde	Season Long	

=== Released ===
Date	Position	Nationality	Name	Joined	Date	Ref.
31 May 2005	FW	(Scotland)	Gerry Britton	Dundee	31 May 2005	
31 May 2005	FW	(Scotland)	Alex Burns	Brechin City	3 August 2005	

== Competitions ==
=== Overview ===
Competition	First match	Last match	Starting round	Final position	Record							
Competition	First match	Last match	Starting round	Final position	Pld	W	D	L	GF	GA	GD	Win %
Premier League	8 August 2004	21 May 2004	Matchday 1	6th	38	13	9	16	46	49	−3	34.21
Scottish Cup	8 January 2005	8 January 2005	Third Round	Third Round	1	0	0	1	0	2	−2	0.00
League Cup	24 August 2004	20 March 2005	Second Round	Runnersup	5	4	0	1	15	4	+11	80.00
Total					44	17	9	18	61	55	+6	38.64

Last updated: 21 May 2005
Source: Competitions

=== Premier League ===
==== Table ====
Pos	Team	Pld	W	D	L	GF	GA	GD	Pts	Qualification or relegation (Note: Teams played each other three times (33 matches), before the league split into two groups (the top six and the bottom six) for the last five matches.)
4	Aberdeen	38	18	7	13	44	39	+5	61	
5	Heart of Midlothian	38	13	11	14	43	41	+2	50	
6	Motherwell	38	13	9	16	46	49	−3	48	
7	Kilmarnock	38	15	4	19	49	55	−6	49	
8	Inverness Caledonian Thistle	38	11	11	16	41	47	−6	44	

Source: Scottish Professional Football League
Rules for classification: 1) Points; 2) Goal difference; 3) Goals scored

==== Results summary ====
Overall								Home						Away					
Pld	W	D	L	GF	GA	GD	Pts	W	D	L	GF	GA	GD	W	D	L	GF	GA	GD
38	13	9	16	46	49	−3	48	8	4	7	29	22	+7	5	5	9	17	27	−10

Source: Fir Park Corner

==== Results by round ====
Round	1	2	3	4	5	6	7	8	9	10	11	12	13	14	15	16	17	18	19	20	21	22	23	24	25	26	27	28	29	30	31	32	33	34	35	36	37	38
Ground	A	H	A	H	A	H	A	A	H	A	H	H	A	H	A	H	A	H	H	A	H	A	A	A	H	H	A	H	A	H	A	A	H	H	A	H	A	H
Result	L	L	W	W	D	W	W	D	L	L	L	L	L	W	W	W	W	W	L	L	D	L	L	L	D	W	D	W	D	L	W	L	D	L	D	D	L	W
Position	11	11	8	5	6	3	2	3	5	7	6	7	7	7	6	6	6	5	5	5	5	6	6	6	6	6	6	5	6	6	6	6	6	6	6	6	6	6

Source: Fir Park Corner
A = Away; H = Home; W = Win; D = Draw; L = Loss

==== Results ====
8 August 2004 1	Celtic	2–0	Motherwell	Glasgow
15:00 BST	McNamara 8'; Sutton 55'	Report		Stadium: Celtic Park; Attendance: 57,245

14 August 2003 2	Motherwell	1–2	Hibernian	Motherwell
15:00 BST	O'Donnell 20'	Report	O'Connor 2', 78'	Stadium: Fir Park; Attendance: 5,859; Referee: John Underhill

21 August 2004 3	Dundee	1–2	Motherwell	Dundee
15:00 BST	Lovell 78'	Report	McDonald 28', 62'	Stadium: Dens Park; Attendance: 4,849

28 August 2004 4	Motherwell	2–0	Hearts	Motherwell
15:00 BST	McBride 59' (pen.); O'Donnell 67'	Report		Stadium: Fir Park; Attendance: 7,095; Referee: Alan Freeland

11 September 2004 5	Dunfermline Athletic	1–1	Motherwell	Dunfermline
15:00 BST	Brewster 9'	Report	McDonald 88'	Stadium: East End Park; Attendance: 4,388

18 September 2004 6	Motherwell	4–2	Dundee United	Motherwell
15:00 BST	McDonald 53', 70'; Clarkson 57'; Burns 90'	Report; BBC	Grady 45'; McIntyre 69'	Stadium: Fir Park; Attendance: 5,091; Referee: Iain Brines

25 September 2004 7	Livingston	2–3	Motherwell	Livingston
15:00 BST	O'Brien 37'; Hamilton 45'	Report; BBC	McBride 11'; McDonald 50'; Foran 71'	Stadium: Almondvale Stadium; Attendance: 4,050; Referee: Craig Thomson

3 October 2004 8	Inverness C.T.	1–1	Motherwell	Aberdeen
15:00 BST	McCaffrey 90'	Report	McDonald 38'	Stadium: Pittodrie Stadium; Attendance: 1,117

17 October 2004 9	Motherwell	0–2	Rangers	Motherwell
14:00 BST		Report; BBC	Pršo 7', 83'	Stadium: Fir Park; Attendance: 10,946; Referee: John Rowbotham

23 October 2004 10	Aberdeen	2–1	Motherwell	Aberdeen
15:00 GMT	Adams 68'; Serverin	Report	McBride 89'	Stadium: Pittodrie Stadium; Attendance: 10,737; Referee: Charlie Richmond

27 October 2004 11	Motherwell	0–1	Kilmarnock	Motherwell
19:45 GMT		Report	Nish 57'	Stadium: Fir Park; Attendance: 4,521

30 October 2004 12	Motherwell	2–3	Celtic	Motherwell
15:00 GMT	Corrigan 67'; Foran 71' (pen.)	Report	McGeady 41'; Thompson 65' (pen.); Beattie 77'	Stadium: Fir Park; Attendance: 10,592

6 November 2004 13	Hibernian	1–0	Motherwell	Edinburgh
15:00 GMT	Murray 79'	Report		Stadium: Easter Road; Attendance: 10,022; Referee: Craig Thomson

13 November 2004 14	Motherwell	3–0	Dundee	Motherwell
15:00 GMT	Clarkson 44'; Paterson 53', 64'	Report		Stadium: Fir Park; Attendance: 4,406

20 November 2010 15	Hearts	0–1	Motherwell	Edinburgh
15:00 GMT		Report	Foran 28' (pen.)	Stadium: Tynecastle Stadium; Attendance: 10,598; Referee: John Rowbotham

27 November 2004 16	Motherwell	2–1	Dunfermline	Motherwell
15:00 GMT	Tod 46' (o.g.); Foran 63'	Report	Tod 65'	Stadium: Fir Park; Attendance: 5,084

4 December 2004 17	Dundee United	0–1	Motherwell	Dundee
15:00 GMT		Report; BBC	Paterson 17'	Stadium: Tannadice Park; Attendance: 5,252; Referee: D McDonald

11 December 2004 18	Motherwell	2–0	Livingston	Motherwell
15:00 GMT	O'Donnell 17'; Foran 47'	Report; BBC		Stadium: Fir Park; Attendance: 4,363; Referee: Ritchie

18 December 2004 19	Motherwell	0–2	Inverness C.T.	Motherwell
15:00 GMT		Report	Hart 17'; Bayne 42'	Stadium: Fir Park; Attendance: 4,267

27 December 2004 20	Rangers	4–1	Motherwell	Glasgow
15:00 GMT	Novo 3', 15'; Arveladze 53'; Thompson 86'	Report; BBC	McDonald 49'	Stadium: Ibrox Stadium; Attendance: 49,909; Referee: Alan Freeland

3 January 2005 21	Motherwell	0–0	Aberdeen	Motherwell
15:00 GMT		Report		Stadium: Fir Park; Attendance: 7,948; Referee: Iain Brines

15 January 2005 22	Kilmarnock	2–0	Motherwell	Kilmarnock
15:00 GMT	Boyd 1', 44'	Report		Stadium: Rugby Park; Attendance: 5,225

22 January 2005 23	Celtic	2–0	Motherwell	Glasgow
15:00 GMT	Petrov 32'; Sutton 57'	Report		Stadium: Celtic Park; Attendance: 58,483

12 February 2005 24	Dundee	2–1	Motherwell	Dundee
15:00 GMT	Lovell 45', 55'	Report	McDonald 40'	Stadium: Dens Park; Attendance: 5,746

15 February 2005 25	Motherwell	1–1	Hibernian	Motherwell
19:45 GMT	Craigan 26'	Report	Riordan 66' (pen.)	Stadium: Fir Park; Attendance: 7,453; Referee: Kenny Clark

19 February 2005 26	Motherwell	2–0	Hearts	Motherwell
15:00 GMT	McDonald 25'; Fitzpatrick 37'	Report		Stadium: Fir Park; Attendance: 7,390; Referee: Calum Murray

2 March 2005 27	Dunfermline	0–0	Motherwell	Dunfermline
19:45 GMT		Report		Stadium: East End Park; Attendance: 3,565

5 March 2005 28	Motherwell	2–0	Dundee United	Motherwell
15:00 GMT	Partridge 4'; McDonald 47'	Report; BBC		Stadium: Fir Park; Attendance: 5,110; Referee: A Freeland

12 March 2005 29	Livingston	1–1	Motherwell	Livingston
15:00 GMT	Craigan 81' (o.g.)	Report; BBC	McDonald 19'	Stadium: Almondvale Stadium; Attendance: 4,609; Referee: Dougie McDonald

3 April 2005 30	Motherwell	2–3	Rangers	Motherwell
14:00 BST	McBride 71' (pen.); Corrigan 84'	Report	Vignal 4', 32'; Pršo 51'	Stadium: Fir Park; Attendance: 10,210

9 April 2005 31	Aberdeen	1–3	Motherwell	Aberdeen
15:00 BST	Heikkinen 38'	Report; BBC	McBride 22' (pen.); Hamilton 32'; McDonald 72'	Stadium: Pittodrie Stadium; Attendance: 10,443

12 April 2005 32	Inverness C.T.	1–0	Motherwell	Inverness
19:45 BST	Bayne 20'	Report		Stadium: Caledonian Stadium; Attendance: 3,746

16 April 2005 33	Motherwell	1–1	Kilmarnock	Motherwell
15:00 BST	Leven 33'	Report	Combe 85' (o.g.)	Stadium: Fir Park; Attendance: 4,999

23 April 2005 34	Motherwell	0–1	Aberdeen	Motherwell
15:00 BST		Report	Mackie 34'	Stadium: Fir Park; Attendance: 5,063; Referee: Charlie Richmond

30 April 2005 35	Hearts	0–0	Motherwell	Edinburgh
15:00 BST		Report		Stadium: Tynecastle Stadium; Attendance: 10,337; Referee: Iain Brines

7 May 2005 36	Motherwell	2–2	Hibernian	Motherwell
15:00 BST	Craigan 16', 49'	Report	Caldwell 81'; Konte 90'	Stadium: Fir Park; Attendance: 8,903; Referee: Craig Mackay

14 May 2005 37	Rangers	4–1	Motherwell	Glasgow
15:00 BST	Buffel 12', 57'; Arveladze 17', 54'	Report; BBC	Andrews 89' (o.g.)	Stadium: Ibrox Stadium; Attendance: 49,495

21 May 2005 38	Motherwell	2–1	Celtic	Motherwell
15:00 BST	McDonald 88', 90'	Report	Sutton 29'	Stadium: Fir Park; Attendance: 12,944

=== Scottish Cup ===
8 January 2005 Third Round	Kilmarnock	2-0	Motherwell	Kilmarnock
15:00 GMT (UTC)	Dindeleux (yellow card) 10' McDonald (yellow card) 24' (goal) 42'; Boyd 45'	Report	Hammell (yellow card) 23'; Craigan (yellow card) 60' (red card) 87'; Foran (yellow card) 81'	Stadium: Rugby Park; Attendance: 6,093; Referee: Craig Thomson

=== League Cup ===
24 August 2004 Second round	Greenock Morton	0-3	Motherwell	Greenock
15:00 BST (UTC+1)	Collins (red card) 67'	Report	Paterson 42'; McBride 67' (pen.); Clarkson 75'	Stadium: Cappielow; Attendance: 3,767; Referee: Willie Young

22 September 2004 Third round	Inverness Caledonian Thistle	1-3	Motherwell	Inverness
19:45 BST (UTC+1)	McCaffrey (yellow card) 31'; Tokely 58'	Report	Foran 47'; O'Donnell 52'; McBride 85'	Stadium: Caledonian Stadium; Attendance: 1,464; Referee: Kevin Toner

9 November 2004 Quarter-final	Inverness Caledonian Thistle	0-5	Motherwell	Livingston
19:45 GMT (UTC)	Dorado (red card) 59'; Brittain (yellow card) 68'; Snodgrass (yellow card) 72'; McNamee (yellow card) 80'	Report	Dorado 3' (o.g.); Foran (yellow card) 20' (goal) 38' (pen.), 60'; O'Donnell 55'; Hammell (yellow card) 72'; Wright 90'	Stadium: Almondvale Stadium; Attendance: 2,886; Referee: Iain Brines

1 February 2005 Semi-final	Motherwell	3-2 (a.e.t.)	Heart of Midlothian	Edinburgh
19:45 GMT (UTC)	Hammell (yellow card) 13'; Craigan 20' (yellow card) 56'; McBride (yellow card) 47'; O'Donnell (yellow card) 53'; Foran 78' (pen.) (yellow card) 111'; Fitzpatrick 120'	Report	Mikoliūnas (yellow card) 38'; Pressley (yellow card) 44'; Burchill 85'; Þórarinsson 90'	Stadium: Easter Road; Attendance: 14,069; Referee: Dougie McDonald

==== Final ====
20 March 2005 Final	Rangers	5-1	Motherwell	Glasgow
15:00 GMT (UTC)	Ross 5'; Kyrgiakos 9', 86'; Ricksen 33'; Novo 48'; Ferguson (yellow card) 82'	Report	Partridge 13'; Craigan (yellow card) 32'; O'Donnell (yellow card) 64'; Fitzpatrick (yellow card) 76'; Corrigan (yellow card) 82'	Stadium: Hampden Park; Attendance: 50,182; Referee: Mike McCurry

== Squad statistics ==
As of match played 21 May 2005

=== Appearances ===
No.	Pos	Nat	Player	Total		Premier League		Scottish Cup		League Cup	
No.	Pos	Nat	Player	Apps	Goals	Apps	Goals	Apps	Goals	Apps	Goals
1	GK	(Scotland) SCO	Gordon Marshall	39	0	33	0	1	0	5	0
2	DF	(Scotland) SCO	Martyn Corrigan	37	2	31	2	1	0	5	0
3	DF	(Scotland) SCO	Steven Hammell	38	0	32	0	1	0	5	0
4	MF	(Scotland) SCO	Brian Kerr	8	0	6+2	0	0	0	0	0
5	DF	(Northern Ireland) NIR	Stephen Craigan	43	4	37	3	1	0	5	1
6	FW	(Scotland) SCO	Gerry Britton	3	0	0+3	0	0	0	0	0
7	FW	(Australia) AUS	Scott McDonald	32	15	26+1	15	1	0	4	0
8	MF	(Scotland) SCO	Scott Leitch	34	0	28+1	0	1	0	4	0
9	FW	(Republic of Ireland) IRL	Richie Foran	41	9	25+10	5	1	0	4+1	4
10	MF	(Scotland) SCO	Phil O'Donnell	23	5	18	3	0	0	5	2
12	FW	(Scotland) SCO	David Clarkson	41	3	25+10	2	1	0	3+2	1
14	DF	(Wales) WAL	David Partridge	32	2	29	1	0	0	3	1
15	GK	(Scotland) SCO	Barry John Corr	6	0	5+1	0	0	0	0	0
16	FW	(Scotland) SCO	Jim Hamilton	14	2	13+1	2	0	0	0	0
17	MF	(Scotland) SCO	Kevin McBride	30	7	24+1	5	1	0	4	2
18	DF	(Scotland) SCO	Jim Paterson	40	4	27+8	3	0	0	4+1	1
19	DF	(Scotland) SCO	Paul Quinn	26	0	20+3	0	0	0	1+2	0
20	FW	(Scotland) SCO	Kenny Wright	8	1	0+7	0	0	0	0+1	1
21	MF	(Scotland) SCO	Shaun Fagan	27	0	11+12	0	0+1	0	0+3	0
22	DF	(Scotland) SCO	Willie Kinniburgh	16	0	10+3	0	1	0	2	0
24	MF	(Scotland) SCO	Marc Fitzpatrick	29	2	14+11	1	1	0	1+2	1
32	DF	(Scotland) SCO	David Keogh	3	0	0+3	0	0	0	0	0
37	MF	(Scotland) SCO	Darren Smith	1	0	0+1	0	0	0	0	0
Players away from the club on loan:
11	FW	(Scotland) SCO	Alex Burns	11	1	4+6	1	0	0	0+1	0
Players who left Motherwell during the season:

=== Goal scorers ===
Ranking	Position	Nation	Number	Name	Premier League	Scottish Cup	League Cup	Total
1	FW	(Australia)	7	Scott McDonald	15	0	0	15
2	FW	(Republic of Ireland)	9	Richie Foran	5	0	4	9
3	MF	(Scotland)	17	Kevin McBride	5	0	2	7
4	MF	(Scotland)	10	Phil O'Donnell	3	0	2	5
5	DF	(Northern Ireland)	5	Stephen Craigan	3	0	1	4
5	DF	(Scotland)	18	Jim Paterson	3	0	1	4
5				Own goal	3	0	1	4
8	FW	(Scotland)	12	David Clarkson	2	0	1	3
9	DF	(Scotland)	2	Martyn Corrigan	2	0	0	2
9	FW	(Scotland)	16	Jim Hamilton	2	0	0	2
9	MF	(Scotland)	24	Marc Fitzpatrick	1	0	1	2
9	DF	(Wales)	14	David Partridge	1	0	1	2
13	FW	(Scotland)	11	Alex Burns	1	0	0	1
13	FW	(Scotland)	20	Kenny Wright	0	0	1	1
				TOTALS	46	0	15	61

=== Clean sheets ===
Ranking	Position	Nation	Number	Name	Premier League	Scottish Cup	League Cup	Total
1	GK	(Scotland)	1	Gordon Marshall	9	0	2	11
				TOTALS	9	0	2	11

=== Disciplinary record ===
Nation	Position	Number	Name	Premier League		Scottish Cup		League Cup		Total	
Nation	Position	Number	Name	Booked	Sent off (straight red)	Booked	Sent off (straight red)	Booked	Sent off (straight red)	Booked	Sent off (straight red)
(Scotland)	GK	1	Gordon Marshall	0	1	0	0	0	0	0	1
(Scotland)	DF	2	Martyn Corrigan	2	0	0	0	1	0	3	0
(Scotland)	DF	3	Steven Hammell	4	0	1	0	2	0	7	0
(Northern Ireland)	DF	5	Stephen Craigan	7	0	2	1	3	0	12	1
(Australia)	FW	7	Scott McDonald	3	0	0	0	0	0	3	0
(Scotland)	MF	8	Scott Leitch	6	0	0	0	0	0	6	0
(Republic of Ireland)	FW	9	Richie Foran	6	0	1	0	2	0	9	0
(Scotland)	FW	12	David Clarkson	5	1	0	0	0	0	5	1
(Wales)	DF	14	David Partridge	6	0	0	0	0	0	6	0
(Scotland)	FW	16	Jim Hamilton	4	0	0	0	0	0	4	0
(Scotland)	MF	17	Kevin McBride	1	0	0	0	1	0	2	0
(Scotland)	DF	18	Jim Paterson	2	0	0	0	0	0	2	0
(Scotland)	DF	19	Paul Quinn	4	0	0	0	0	0	4	0
(Scotland)	FW	20	Kenny Wright	1	0	0	0	0	0	1	0
(Scotland)	MF	21	Shaun Fagan	2	0	0	0	0	0	1	0
(Scotland)	DF	22	Willie Kinniburgh	1	0	0	0	0	0	1	0
(Scotland)	MF	24	Marc Fitzpatrick	1	0	0	0	1	0	2	0
(Scotland)	FW	33	Adam Coakley	1	0	0	0	0	0	1	0
			TOTALS	56	2	4	1	10	0	70	3

== See also ==
- List of Motherwell F.C. seasons
