= Paul Quinn (footballer, born 1985) =

Scottish footballer

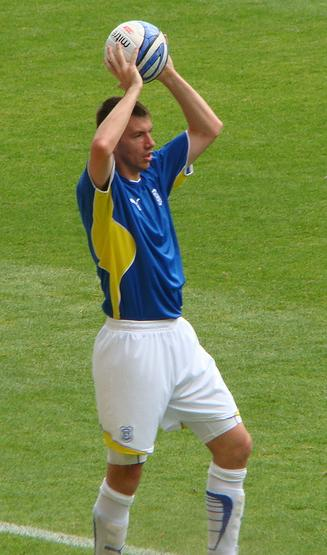
- Quinn playing for Cardiff City

Personal information
- Full name: Paul Charles Quinn
- Date of birth: 21 July 1985 (age 41)
- Place of birth: Wishaw, Scotland
- Position: Centre back

Senior career*
Years	Team	Apps	(Gls)
2002–2009	Motherwell	161	(3)
2009–2012	Cardiff City	46	(1)
2012–2014	Doncaster Rovers	73	(2)
2014–2015	Ross County	29	(3)
2015–2016	Aberdeen	13	(1)
2016–2017	Ross County	33	(0)
2017–2018	Dundee United	16	(0)
Total		371	(10)

International career
2004–2006	Scotland U21	3	(0)
- * Club domestic league appearances and goals

Paul Charles Quinn (born 21 July 1985) is a Scottish former professional footballer. His usual position was right back, but he could also play at centre back or on the right wing. Quinn started his career at Motherwell and also played for Cardiff City, Doncaster Rovers, Ross County (two spells), Aberdeen and Dundee United.

== Career ==
=== Motherwell ===
Born in Wishaw, Quinn came through the youth ranks at Motherwell and signed a professional contract with the club on 12 May 2002. In the 2002–03 season, he made his first professional appearance for the club, replacing Brian Dempsie as a substitute during the SPL game against Celtic on 1 December 2002. He did not feature regularly but in following seasons he proved his worth and also his versatility, by starting 27 and 26 games in all competitions during the 2003–04 and 2004–05 seasons respectively, filling a number of different positions in the Motherwell defence. Quinn scored his first goal for Motherwell during the Scottish Premier League match against Kilmarnock on 21 February 2004. He did not score another goal for the club for over three years, when he scored during a league match against Aberdeen on 15 September 2007.

He was restricted to just 21 games during the 2005–06 season, but in the following seasons, he established himself as a first team player and at the beginning of the 2007–08 season he was a first choice in the Motherwell defence, displacing Martyn Corrigan at right back. Such has been the quality of his performances and the general improvement in his game under Mark McGhee that Corrigan was limited to one starting performance during the first half of the 2007–08 season and left to seek first-team football at Kilmarnock.

On 11 January 2008, it was announced that Quinn would assume the role of club captain, due to the sudden death of Phil O'Donnell the previous month. At the age of 22, Quinn became one of the youngest captains in the Motherwell's history. Although vice-captain Stephen Craigan was widely expected to be promoted to the position of club captain, he continued in his existing role.

=== Cardiff City ===
On 4 June 2009 he signed for Football League Championship side Cardiff City on a three-year contract for a fee of around £300,000, describing the transfer as his "ideal move". He made his debut for the club in a 4–0 win over Scunthorpe United, the first competitive match at the Cardiff City Stadium. On 17 August 2010, it was revealed that Motherwell were still owed around £175,000 of the transfer fee and that no further payments had been made toward the fee since January 2010. However, the following week Cardiff reached an agreement with Motherwell and £100,000 of the remaining fee was paid. Quinn scored his first Cardiff goal on 2 April 2011, in a 4–1 win over Derby County.

Quinn was named captain for the League Cup game against Oxford United. and again for Huddersfield Town. He got his first league appearance off the season against Southampton, on 28 September, following a knock to Kevin McNaughton in the game. After only four starts during the season, Quinn was released at the end of his contract.

=== Doncaster Rovers ===
Following his release, Quinn joined Doncaster Rovers on trial playing in a goalless draw against Sheffield Wednesday. On 9 August, Quinn signed a one-year deal at Keepmoat Stadium.

Quinn then went on to make 43 league and cup appearances for Doncaster Rovers, helping them become League 1 Champions when he cleared the missed penalty at the Brentford game on the final day of the season, his long pass out of the box finding Billy Paynter just inside his own half who went up to the other end and passed to James Coppinger to score the winner. On 27 July 2013 he signed a new deal lasting until June 2015. However, on 22 August 2014, his contract with the club was ended by mutual consent.

=== Ross County ===
Quinn returned to Scottish football in October 2014, when he signed for Ross County. He made his debut as a substitute in Ross County's 5–0 loss against Celtic on 18 October 2014.

=== Aberdeen ===
In June 2015, Quinn signed a two-year deal with Aberdeen after becoming a free agent. He made his debut for Aberdeen on 2 July 2015, against FK Shkëndija in the first qualifying round of the Europa League. Quinn scored his first league goal for Aberdeen in the 86th minute of a 2–1 victory against Celtic at Pittodrie, sending Aberdeen to the top of the table.

=== Ross County (second spell) ===
On 26 January 2016, Quinn returned to Ross County, signing an 18-month contract. He scored on his debut as Ross County beat Celtic 3–1 to reach the final of the Scottish League Cup. He played in the final, as Ross County won 2–1 against Hibernian.

Ahead of the 2016–17 season, Quinn was handed the captaincy at Ross County, after the previous captain Andrew Davies had asked to leave the club. At the end of his contract, Quinn was released by Ross County.

=== Dundee United ===
Quinn signed a short-term contract with Scottish Championship club Dundee United in August 2017. In January 2018, he extended his contract until the end of the 2017–18 season. Quinn was released by United in May 2018, following the end of his contract.

== Personal life ==
In June 2008, Quinn and his girlfriend were robbed at gunpoint whilst holidaying in Florida, United States. The couple had been returning to their hotel when the incident took place.

== Career statistics ==
Appearances and goals by club, season and competition
Club	Season	League			National Cup		League Cup		Other		Total	
Club	Season	Division	Apps	Goals	Apps	Goals	Apps	Goals	Apps	Goals	Apps	Goals
Motherwell	2002–03	Scottish Premier League	4	0	0	0	0	0	0	0	4	0
Motherwell	2003–04	Scottish Premier League	26	0	3	0	0	0	0	0	29	0
Motherwell	2004–05	Scottish Premier League	23	0	0	0	3	0	0	0	26	0
Motherwell	2005–06	Scottish Premier League	18	0	0	0	3	0	0	0	21	0
Motherwell	2006–07	Scottish Premier League	26	0	0	0	3	0	0	0	29	0
Motherwell	2007–08	Scottish Premier League	31	2	2	0	2	1	0	0	35	3
Motherwell	2008–09	Scottish Premier League	33	1	3	0	1	0	2 (Note: Appearances in the Europa League)	0	39	1
Motherwell	Total		161	3	8	0	12	1	2	0	183	4
Cardiff City	2009–10	Championship	22	0	2	0	2	0	1 (Note: Appearances in the Championship play-offs)	0	27	0
Cardiff City	2010–11	Championship	23	1	1	0	2	0	1	0	27	1
Cardiff City	2011–12	Championship	1	0	1	0	3	0	0	0	5	0
Cardiff City	Total		46	1	4	0	7	0	2	0	59	1
Doncaster Rovers	2012–13	League One	38	0	1	0	3	0	1 (Note: Appearance in the Football League Trophy)	0	43	0
Doncaster Rovers	2013–14	Championship	35	2	1	0	1	0	0	0	37	2
Doncaster Rovers	Total		73	2	2	0	4	0	1	0	80	2
Ross County	2014–15	Scottish Premiership	29	3	1	0	0	0	0	0	30	3
Aberdeen	2015–16	Scottish Premiership	13	1	0	0	0	0	5	0	18	1
Ross County	2015–16	Scottish Premiership	14	0	2	1	2	1	0	0	18	2
Ross County	2016–17	Scottish Premiership	19	0	1	1	2	0	0	0	22	1
Ross County	Total		33	0	3	2	4	1	0	0	40	3
Dundee United	2017–18	Scottish Championship	16	0	1	0	0	0	2 (Note: Appearance in the Scottish Challenge Cup)	0	19	0
Career total			371	10	19	2	27	2	12	0	428	14

== Honours ==
Doncaster Rovers

- Football League One: 2012–13

Ross County

- Scottish League Cup: 2015–16
