= David Clarkson (Scottish footballer) =

Scottish footballer (born 1985)

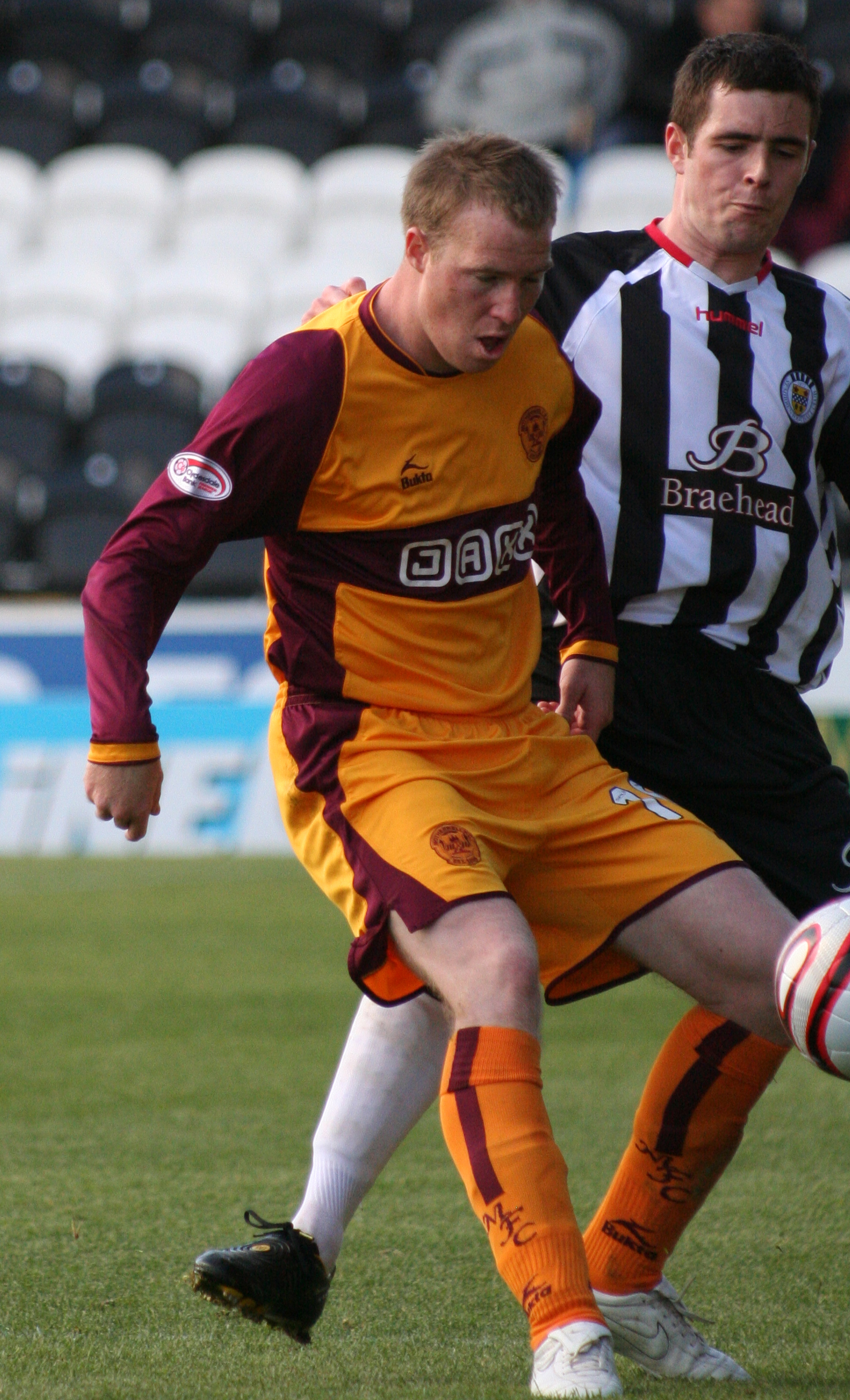
- Clarkson (left) playing for Motherwell

Personal information
- Full name: David Clarkson
- Date of birth: 10 September 1985 (age 41)
- Place of birth: Bellshill, Scotland
- Height: 1.78 m (5 ft 10 in)
- Position: Striker

Team information
- Current team: Motherwell (academy director)

Senior career*
Years	Team	Apps	(Gls)
2002–2009	Motherwell	219	(49)
2009–2012	Bristol City	63	(11)
2011	→ Brentford (loan)	4	(1)
2012–2014	Bristol Rovers	60	(12)
2014–2015	Dundee	23	(8)
2015–2016	Motherwell	7	(0)
2016	→ St Mirren (loan)	12	(1)
2016–2017	St Mirren	16	(1)
Total		404	(83)

International career
2004–2006	Scotland U21	11	(1)
2009	Scotland B	1	(0)
2008	Scotland	2	(1)
- * Club domestic league appearances and goals

David Clarkson (born 10 September 1985) is a Scottish football player and coach, who is academy director at Motherwell.

During his playing career, Clarkson played for Motherwell, Bristol City, Brentford, Bristol Rovers, Dundee and St Mirren. He appeared in two full internationals for Scotland, both in 2008.

== Club career ==
=== Motherwell ===
Born in Bellshill, Scotland, Clarkson made his debut for local club Motherwell in December 2002, scoring his first goal nine minutes into his first starting appearance for the club, at home in an SPL match against Partick Thistle on 2 January 2003. Clarkson went on to score three goals in his first season, and was a regular from the following season, playing in the majority of matches. He scored 13 goals for Motherwell in the 2007–08 season, during which his uncle, Phil O'Donnell, collapsed and later died from heart failure during a match against Dundee United. Clarkson was later voted player of the year. Clarkson went on to wear O'Donnell's old squad number, 10, during the 2008–09 season.

=== Bristol City ===
On 29 June 2009, Clarkson joined Bristol City and signed a three-year contract for an undisclosed fee, reportedly £800,000. Clarkson scored on his debut for Bristol City, in a 2–2 draw at Preston North End. On 6 February 2010, he scored an equaliser for Bristol City against Coventry City, the match finished 1–1. He scored his third goal for City at home to Leicester City. On 21 August 2010, Clarkson scored his first goal in the 2010–11 season in a 3–3 draw with Barnsley. He netted his second of the season in a 2–0 win over Scunthorpe United at Glanford Park, the goal in the 90th minute.

On 1 May 2012, Clarkson was released by Bristol City.

==== Brentford (loan) ====
Clarkson completed a one-month loan move to Brentford on 15 September 2011 and made his debut in the away win at Oldham Athletic on 24 September. He scored his first goal for the club away to Carlisle United on 8 October 2011, in a 2–2 draw. Clarkson gave Brentford the lead within the first 10 minutes, but on 63 minutes, he scored an own goal when he stuck a leg out from a cross and put the ball into his own net to give Carlisle a 2–1 lead. He made amends by assisting for Toumani Diagouraga to level the match two minutes from the end.

=== Bristol Rovers ===
Clarkson joined Bristol Rovers on 27 July 2012 having spent pre-season on trial with the club. The move reunited him with his old manager at Motherwell, Mark McGhee. He made his debut on 14 August 2012, in a 3–1 defeat against Ipswich Town in the League Cup, playing the full 90 minutes. He scored his first goal for the club in a 2–2 home draw on 8 September against Aldershot. Clarkson added more goals to his tally during the season, in a 2–1 win away at Exeter City, a 1–1 draw against Burton Albion at the Pirelli Stadium, a 2–1 home defeat against Sheffield United in the FA Cup, a 3–2 loss at home to Southend United, a 2–1 loss away at Rochdale, and another 2–2 draw at Aldershot Town on 26 December 2012.

It was announced on 28 February 2013 that Clarkson would miss the rest of the season due to an ankle injury. Clarkson was one of 12 players released by Bristol Rovers in May 2014, after the club had been relegated to the Conference National. He scored 13 goals in 69 games for Bristol Rovers.

After leaving Bristol Rovers, Clarkson had a trial spell with Motherwell in July 2014, but was not offered a contract. He also played in pre-season as a trialist for Kilmarnock and St Johnstone.

=== Dundee ===
On 8 September 2014, Clarkson signed for Dundee. He scored on his debut for the club, a 2–1 defeat against Ross County on 27 September 2014. Clarkson went on to score eight goals in his first eight games for the club, scoring in every match and his form was rewarded when he won the SPFL Player of the Month award for November. Clarkson left Dundee at the end of the season having not been offered a new contract.

=== Motherwell ===
On 25 June 2015, Clarkson signed for Motherwell for a second time, signing a one-year contract with the option of a second year. He made his second debut for the club on 1 August 2015, in a 1–0 win against Inverness Caledonian Thistle. After making only seven appearances as a substitute during the 2015–16 season, Clarkson signed on loan with Scottish Championship side St Mirren in January 2016, with the deal lasting until the end of the season.

=== St Mirren ===
After being released by Motherwell, Clarkson returned to Paisley signing a one-year deal with St Mirren in May 2016.

== International career ==
Clarkson was called up by George Burley for Scotland's friendly match against the Czech Republic on 30 May 2008. He came on as a substitute in the match, and scored Scotland's only goal in the 85th minute when he took down a cross, spun and fired past Czech keeper Petr Čech. Clarkson got his second cap coming on as a substitute, in a 1–0 friendly loss to Argentina on 19 November 2008.

Clarkson played for and captained the Scotland B team, in a 3–0 friendly win over the Northern Ireland B team on 6 May 2009.

== Post-playing career ==
Following his retirement, Clarkson returned to former club Motherwell as Head of Youth as well as coaching in their academy. In January 2023, he was named academy director.

== Personal life ==
Clarkson's uncle Phil O'Donnell played alongside him at Motherwell, before his death in 2007. He has several other family members who have been professional footballers. His cousin Stephen O'Donnell last played for Clyde and another cousin Brian Dempsie previously played for Motherwell.

== Career statistics ==
=== Club ===
As of match played 4 November 2017

Appearances and goals by club, season and competition
Club	Season	League			National cup		League cup		Other (Note: Includes two matches in 2008–09 for Motherwell v Nancy that are not listed on Soccerbase.)		Total	
Club	Season	Division	Apps	Goals	Apps	Goals	Apps	Goals	Apps	Goals	Apps	Goals
Motherwell	2002–03	Scottish Premier League	19	3	4	0	—		—		23	3
Motherwell	2003–04	Scottish Premier League	38	12	3	2	1	0	—		42	14
Motherwell	2004–05	Scottish Premier League	35	3	1	0	5	1	—		41	4
Motherwell	2005–06	Scottish Premier League	32	4	1	0	2	1	—		35	5
Motherwell	2006–07	Scottish Premier League	29	2	3	0	2	1	—		34	3
Motherwell	2007–08	Scottish Premier League	35	12	3	0	3	1	—		41	13
Motherwell	2008–09	Scottish Premier League	33	13	3	1	1	0	2 (Note: Appearances in the UEFA Cup)	0	39	14
Motherwell	Total		219	49	18	3	14	4	2	0	253	56
Bristol City	2009–10	Championship	26	4	1	0	—		—		27	4
Bristol City	2010–11	Championship	33	7	1	0	1	0	—		35	7
Bristol City	2011–12	Championship	4	0	1	0	—		—		5	0
Bristol City	Total		63	11	3	0	1	0	—		67	11
Brentford (loan)	2011–12	League One	4	1	—		—		1 (Note: Appearances in the Football League Trophy)	0	5	1
Bristol Rovers	2012–13	League Two	26	6	1	1	1	0	1	0	29	7
Bristol Rovers	2013–14	League Two	34	6	4	0	1	0	1	0	40	6
Bristol Rovers	Total		60	12	5	1	2	0	2	0	69	13
Dundee	2014–15	Scottish Premiership	23	8	2	1	—		—		25	9
Motherwell	2015–16	Scottish Premiership	7	0	—		1	0	—		8	0
St Mirren (loan)	2015–16	Scottish Championship	12	1	—		—		—		12	1
St Mirren	2016–17	Scottish Championship	16	1	1	0	4	2	3 (Note: Appearances in the Scottish Challenge Cup)	1	24	4
Career total			404	83	29	5	22	6	8	1	463	95

=== International ===
Scores and results list Scotland's goal tally first, score column indicates score after each Clarkson goal.

List of international goals scored by David Clarkson
No.	Date	Venue	Opponent	Score	Result	Competition
1	30 May 2008	Prague, Czech Republic	Czech Republic	1–2	1–3	Friendly

== Honours ==
Motherwell

- Scottish League Cup Runner-up: 2004–05

Individual

- Scottish Premier League Young Player of the Month: January 2004
- SPFL Player of the Month: November 2014
