= Willie Kinniburgh =

Scottish footballer (born 1984)

William Kinniburgh
Personal information
- Full name: William Daniel Kinniburgh
- Date of birth: 8 September 1984 (age 42)
- Place of birth: Glasgow, Scotland
- Position: Defender

Youth career
- –2001: Motherwell

Senior career*
Years	Team	Apps	(Gls)
2001–2008	Motherwell	58	(3)
2003	→ Ayr United (loan)	7	(0)
2007	→ Partick Thistle (loan)	6	(0)
2008–2012	Partick Thistle	61	(1)
2010	→ Clyde (loan)	14	(0)
2012–2013	Irvine Meadow		
2013–2014	Cambuslang Rangers		
2014–2015	Thorniewood United		
2015	Largs Thistle	5	(0)
2015	Hurlford Thistle		

International career^{‡}
2004–2005	Scotland U-21	2	(0)

Managerial career
- 2019–2022: Gartcairn F. A. Juniors
- * Club domestic league appearances and goals as of 18:58, 3 July 2020 (UTC) ‡ National team caps and goals as of 26 June 2012

William Daniel Kinniburgh (born 8 September 1984, in Glasgow) is a retired footballer who was the manager with Gartcairn F. A. Juniors in the West of Scotland Football League. He has played in the Scottish Premier League for Motherwell and the Scottish Football League for Ayr United and Partick Thistle.

== Career ==
Kinniburgh was a product of the Motherwell youth set-up and made his debut on 12 May 2002, against Dundee. On 15 November 2003, Kinniburgh signed for Ayr United on loan.

Kinniburgh joined Partick Thistle on loan in late 2007 and on 18 January 2008 was signed by them for an undisclosed fee. He scored his first and only goal for Partick in a 2–1 defeat to Falkirk in April 2011.

He joined Clyde on loan in January 2010, until the end of the season.

Kinniburgh terminated his contract at Thistle in May 2012 to pursue a career as a police officer and signed on a part-time basis for Scottish Junior West Region Junior champions Irvine Meadow the following month. In June 2013, he signed for fellow Junior club Cambuslang Rangers, however he left the club in January 2014. Kinniburgh signed for Thorniewood United in August 2014. After leaving Thorniewood, Kinniburgh signed for Largs Thistle in March 2015. He made five appearances for the club before leaving in the summer by mutual consent.

Kinniburgh made six appearances for the Scotland U-21 team in his early career.

After spending time as a coach with Partick Thistle, Kinniburgh became manager of junior side Gartcairn F. A. Juniors. He left the club in 2022.

== Personal life ==
His younger brother Steven is also a professional footballer, currently Academy Manager at Oxford United.

== Career statistics ==
Appearances and goals by club, season and competition
Club	Season	League			Cup		League Cup		Other		Total	
Club	Season	Division	Apps	Goals	Apps	Goals	Apps	Goals	Apps	Goals	Apps	Goals
Motherwell	2001–02	Scottish Premier League	1	0	0	0	0	0	0	0	1	0
Motherwell	2002–03	Scottish Premier League	15	1	1	0	0	0	0	0	16	1
Motherwell	2003–04	Scottish Premier League	1	0	0	0	0	0	0	0	1	0
Motherwell	2004–05	Scottish Premier League	13	0	1	0	2	0	0	0	16	0
Motherwell	2005–06	Scottish Premier League	21	0	1	0	1	0	0	0	23	0
Motherwell	2006–07	Scottish Premier League	6	0	0	0	0	0	0	0	6	0
Motherwell	2007–08	Scottish Premier League	1	0	0	0	1	0	0	0	2	0
Motherwell	Total		58	3	3	0	4	0	0	0	65	3
Ayr United (loan)	2003–04	Scottish First Division	7	0	0	0	0	0	0	0	7	0
Partick Thistle (loan)	2007–08	Scottish First Division	6	0	0	0	0	0	0	0	6	0
Partick Thistle	2007–08	Scottish First Division	13	0	2	0	0	0	0	0	15	0
Partick Thistle	2008–09	Scottish First Division	18	0	0	0	0	0	1	0	19	0
Partick Thistle	2009–10	Scottish First Division	2	0	0	0	0	0	1	0	3	0
Partick Thistle	2010–11	Scottish First Division	23	0	3	0	1	0	0	0	27	0
Partick Thistle	2011–12	Scottish First Division	5	0	0	0	1	0	1	0	7	0
Partick Thistle	Total		67	1	5	0	2	0	3	0	77	1
Clyde (loan)	2009–10	Scottish Second Division	14	0	0	0	0	0	0	0	14	0
Career total			146	4	8	0	6	0	3	0	163	4
