= John Kane (footballer, born 1987) =

Scottish footballer

Personal information
- Full name: John Kane
- Date of birth: 8 June 1987 (age 39)
- Place of birth: Glasgow, Scotland
- Position: Defender

Team information
- Current team: Pollok

Youth career
- –2003: Hibernian Youth

Senior career*
Years	Team	Apps	(Gls)
2003–2005	Hibernian	1	(0)
2005–2006	Motherwell	0	(0)
2006–2007	Partick Thistle	3	(0)
2007	Glenafton Athletic		
2007–2009	Stranraer	97	(2)
2009–2010	Creighton University		
2010–2011	Stirling Albion	26	(1)
2011–2012	Stranraer	32	(1)
2012–2013	Clyde	22	(0)
2013–	Pollok	0	(0)
- * Club domestic league appearances and goals as of 15:06, 11 April 2013 (UTC)

John Kane (born 8 June 1987) is a footballer who plays as a defender for Pollok.

Kane came through the youth system at Hibernian. He made his Scottish Premier League debut at the age of 16 against Livingston in April 2004, coming on as a late substitute for Kevin Thomson. Although a Scotland Under–18 international, this was to be his only first-team appearance for Hibs, and he joined Motherwell in the January 2005 transfer window.

After a spell at Partick Thistle, he briefly dropped to the Junior level with Glenafton Athletic before signing for Stranraer in June 2007, under the management of former Motherwell teammate Gerry Britton. A successful spell at the club saw him named player of the year two seasons running before leaving for the US and a year at Creighton University in Nebraska. Kane returned to Scotland with Stirling Albion in 2010 before rejoining Stranraer for a second spell.

Kane signed for Clyde in June 2012. He then joined Junior side Pollok.
