= Daniel Sengewald =

German footballer (born 1975)

Personal information
- Full name: Daniel Kay Sengewald
- Date of birth: 16 December 1975 (age 50)
- Place of birth: Jena, East Germany
- Height: 1.92 m (6 ft 4 in)
- Position: Defender

Senior career*
Years	Team	Apps	(Gls)
- Carl Zeiss Jena
- Sachsen Leipzig
- 1860 Munich
2001–2002	SC Verl	9	(1)
2002	Antwerp		
2002–2003	Motherwell	7	(0)
2003–2004	Bonner SC		
2004–2005	SSV Ulm		
2005	SV Sandhausen		
2006–2007	Partizani Tirana		
- * Club domestic league appearances and goals

Daniel Kay Sengewald (born 16 December 1975) is a German former professional footballer who played as a defender.

Sengewald was born in Jena, East Germany. He played most of his career in the lower leagues of German football. His first taste of non-German football came with Belgian club Royal Antwerp, before moving to Scotland to play for top-flight side Motherwell. He made seven appearances at Fir Park, but also got sent-off in his final game. He then left Scotland to play for another batch of lower-league German clubs, before then moving to Albania with Partizani.
