= Brian Dempsie =

Scottish footballer

Personal information
- Full name: Brian Dempsie
- Date of birth: 4 February 1983 (age 43)
- Place of birth: Bellshill, Scotland
- Height: 1.83 m (6 ft 0 in)
- Position: Defender

Senior career*
Years	Team	Apps	(Gls)
1999–2003	Motherwell	1	(0)
- * Club domestic league appearances and goals

Brian Dempsie (born 4 February 1983, in Bellshill, Scotland) Scottish former professional footballer, who played for Motherwell.

Despite being at the club from 1999 to 2003 he never managed to become a regular first team player and was released when his contract expired. He made his first team debut as a substitute for Martyn Corrigan in a Scottish Cup game against Dundee United on 17 February 2001. Dempsie made his only league appearance on 1 December 2002, starting a match against Celtic before being replaced by Paul Quinn.

After leaving Motherwell, Dempsie quit football and became a firefighter with Strathclyde Fire Brigade. On 8 February 2008, Dempsie and a fellow firefighter were badly injured by falling brickwork while attending a fire at a garage in Bothwell, South Lanarkshire. In January 2013, they both received £332,500 in damages from the incident, after suing the Strathclyde Fire Board.

Dempsie is the nephew of the late Phil O'Donnell and cousin of Stephen O'Donnell and David Clarkson, the latter also a former player of the Fir Park club. He is credited with helping to gain Clarkson a trial with the club.
