= François Dubourdeau =

French footballer (born 1980)

Personal information
- Full name: François Dubourdeau
- Date of birth: 4 December 1980 (age 45)
- Place of birth: Angoulême, France
- Height: 1.92 m (6 ft 4 in)
- Position: Goalkeeper

Senior career*
Years	Team	Apps	(Gls)
1998–1999	Angoulême CFC	2	(0)
1999–2001	Bordeaux B	?	(?)
2001–2003	Motherwell	26	(0)
2003–2004	Kilmarnock	19	(0)
2005	Dundee	0	(0)
2005–2006	Forfar Athletic	18	(0)
2006–2007	Accrington Stanley	0	(0)
2006–2007	→ Southport (loan)	3	(0)
2007	Cincinnati Kings	1	(0)
2007–2008	AS Cozes	?	(?)
- * Club domestic league appearances and goals

François Dubourdeau (born 4 December 1980) is a French footballer who completed his career by playing for Cincinnati Kings in the USL Second Division. His previous clubs include Motherwell, Kilmarnock, Dundee, Forfar Athletic and Accrington Stanley.

Dubourdeau was a fans-favourite at Motherwell after he starred in a 1–0 victory against Rangers. Despite this, Dubourdeau was released in May 2003 by manager Terry Butcher. In August of the same year, Dubourdeau was signed by fellow Scottish Premier League side Kilmarnock.
