= Stephen Craigan =

Northern Irish footballer

Personal information
- Full name: Stephen James Craigan
- Date of birth: 29 October 1976 (age 50)
- Place of birth: Newtownards, Northern Ireland
- Position: Defender

Senior career*
Years	Team	Apps	(Gls)
1994–1995	Blantyre Victoria		
1995–2000	Motherwell	22	(0)
2000–2003	Partick Thistle	106	(1)
2003–2012	Motherwell	292	(5)
Total		417	(6)

International career^{‡}
2003	Northern Ireland B	1	(0)
2003–2011	Northern Ireland	54	(0)

Managerial career
- 2009: Motherwell (caretaker)
- 2015: Motherwell (caretaker)
- * Club domestic league appearances and goals as of 18:51, 13 May 2012 (UTC) ‡ National team caps and goals as of 12:09, 19 July 2011 (UTC)

Stephen James Craigan (born 29 October 1976) is a Northern Irish former professional footballer. He played in central defence and spent his entire playing career in Scotland, playing for Motherwell (twice) and Partick Thistle. He has also played for the Northern Ireland national team. He is currently a pundit for Viaplay's coverage of the Scottish League Cup and a First Team Coach at Aberdeen.

== Club career ==
A boyhood Glentoran fan, Craigan started his career in Scotland with Motherwell in 1994 when he was signed by Alex McLeish. However, after only twenty-six appearances, he was released on a free transfer. He signed for Scottish Second Division club Partick Thistle in 2000 and helped them back to the Scottish Premier League, making 121 appearances. After his contract expired in 2003, he returned to Motherwell, who were then managed by former England international Terry Butcher.

Since then, Craigan has been an integral part of Motherwell's steady progress in the league. Craigan has since gone on to become Motherwell's most capped player. He works for BBC Radio Scotland, also commentated on some European matches for Setanta Sports and ESPN. Craigan is a regular pundit on Sky Sports News Radio, rounding up the weekly hot topics in the Scottish Premiership.

In January 2008, Craigan was made club captain of Motherwell, taking over from Phil O'Donnell, who died after collapsing on the pitch during a match against Dundee United on 29 December 2007.

In June 2009, Craigan was appointed the player-caretaker manager of Motherwell while the club looked for a replacement for Mark McGhee, who departed for Aberdeen. This temporary appointment ended when Jim Gannon was hired as the new manager. He endured a troubled relationship with Gannon, featuring in only seven of the seventeen league games he was in charge at Motherwell after being publicly criticised by the manager, but returned to regular first-team action under Craig Brown. On 16 April 2011 Craigan scored his first goal since 2006 with a header to open the scoring in the Scottish Cup semi-final against St Johnstone, which Motherwell won 3–0 to advance to the 2011 Scottish Cup Final.

On 9 June 2011, Craigan signed a new one-year contract at Motherwell. Craigan was awarded a testimonial match, against his former club Partick Thistle. He scored the only goal of the game, on 13 July 2011. On 9 May 2012, Craigan announced that he would retire after Motherwell's last game of the 2011–12 Scottish Premier League season.

On 29 October 2021, it was announced that Craigan was to be inducted into the Motherwell F.C. Hall of Fame.

== International career ==
Craigan is Motherwell's record cap holder, having received 54 caps for Northern Ireland while playing for the club. Craigan played in their 1–0 victory against England in September 2005 and the 3–2 win over Spain a year later. He captained his country on their end of season tour in 2010 against Turkey and Chile and continued as captain against Montenegro on 11 August 2010. His 50th cap came in a surprise victory away to Slovenia on 3 September 2010, in their first game of the Euro 2012 campaign. On 19 July 2011, Craigan announced his retirement from International football, earning 54 caps, the last of those coming against Slovenia.

== Coaching career ==
Craigan has made steady strides into management. As well as being caretaker manager for Motherwell in 2009, he was named assistant manager of the Northern Ireland Under-19 squad on 11 October 2012. He also continued working as a football pundit for radio and television. In July 2015, Craigan was appointed manager of Motherwell's under-20 team. After manager Ian Baraclough left the club in September, Craigan was put in temporary control of the first team. In June 2026, he was appointed First Team Coach at Aberdeen, with responsibilities for development of emerging talent.

== Media career ==
Since BT Sport took over ESPN UK's rights to the SPFL in 2013, Craigan's journeyman football career has been superseded by his work as a studio pundit on the network, regularly appearing alongside Darrell Currie, and fellow pundits Chris Sutton and Ally McCoist. From the start of the 2016–17 season Craigan has also appeared on BT Sport's coverage of the Scottish League Cup, working as an analyst and co-commentator, alongside Rob MacLean or Rory Hamilton. He also works as a pundit on Premier Sport's coverage of Scottish Football.

== Career statistics ==
As of 13 May 2012

Club	Season	League		Cup		League Cup		Other		Total	
Club	Season	Apps	Goals	Apps	Goals	Apps	Goals	Apps	Goals	Apps	Goals
Motherwell
Motherwell	1997–98	14	0	0	0	0	0	0	0	14	0
Motherwell	1998–99	10	0	1	0	1	0	0	0	12	0
Motherwell	1999–2000	4	0	1	0	1	0	0	0	6	0
Motherwell	Total	26	0	2	0	2	0	0	0	30	0
Partick Thistle
Partick Thistle	2000–01	35	1	2	0	1	0	1	0	39	1
Partick Thistle	2001–02	32	0	6	0	2	0	3	0	43	0
Partick Thistle	2002–03	39	0	1	0	3	0	0	0	43	0
Partick Thistle	Total	106	1	9	0	6	0	4	0	125	1
Motherwell
Motherwell	2003–04	36	3	0	0	1	0	0	0	37	3
Motherwell	2004–05	37	3	1	0	5	1	0	0	43	4
Motherwell	2005–06	36	2	0	0	3	0	0	0	39	2
Motherwell	2006–07	34	0	3	0	3	0	0	0	40	0
Motherwell	2007–08	38	0	3	0	2	0	0	0	43	0
Motherwell	2008–09	22	0	3	0	1	0	2	0	28	0
Motherwell	2009–10	28	0	1	0	1	0	6	0	36	0
Motherwell	2010–11	35	0	6	1	3	0	6	0	50	1
Motherwell	2011–12	26	0	1	0	1	0	0	0	28	0
Motherwell	Total	292	8	18	1	17	1	14	0	341	10
Motherwell Total		318	8	20	1	20	1	14	0	357	10
Career Total		424	9	31	1	27	1	18	0	486	11

=== International ===
As of August 2011

Northern Ireland national team
Year	Apps	Goals
2003	3	0
2004	7	0
2005	8	0
2006	8	0
2007	7	0
2008	5	0
2009	7	0
2010	7	0
2011	2	0
Total	54	0
