= Dirk Lehmann =

German footballer

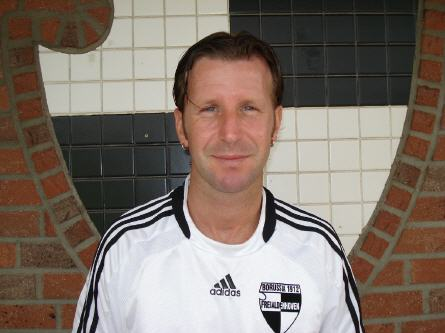
- Lehmann with Borussia Freialdenhoven

Personal information
- Full name: Dirk Johannes Lehmann
- Date of birth: 16 August 1971 (age 55)
- Place of birth: Aachen, West Germany
- Height: 1.85 m (6 ft 1 in)
- Position: Striker

Team information
- Current team: SC Ederen (manager)

Youth career
- Alemannia Aachen

Senior career*
Years	Team	Apps	(Gls)
1992–1994	1. FC Köln		
1994–1996	Lierse	18	(7)
1996–1997	Molenbeek	26	(2)
1997–1998	Energie Cottbus	24	(1)
1998–1999	Fulham	26	(2)
1999–2000	Hibernian	59	(9)
2001–2002	Brighton & Hove Albion	7	(0)
2002–2003	Motherwell	43	(9)
2003	Yokohama FC	12	(1)
2004	Jahn Regensburg	6	(1)
2004–2013	Borussia Freialdenhoven		
2012–2014	Borussia Freialdenhoven II		
2014–2015	Alemannia Bourheim	22	(2)
2015–2016	Sportfreunde Düren	8	(0)
2016–2020	Hambach		

Managerial career
- 2009–2012: Borussia Freialdenhoven (assistant)
- 2012–2014: Borussia Freialdenhoven II (player-manager)
- 2014–2015: Alemannia Bourheim (player-manager)
- 2015–2016: Sportfreunde Düren (player-manager)
- 2016–2020: Hambach (player-manager)
- 2020–2023: Alemannia Aachen (U-17 manager)
- 2023–: SC Ederen
- * Club domestic league appearances and goals

Dirk Johannes Lehmann (born 16 August 1971) is a German former professional footballer who is currently the manager of SC 1910 Ederen.

== Career ==
Lehmann was born in Aachen. He made his senior debut with 1. FC Köln, and after a brief spell with Lierse S.K., joined another Belgian side in R.W.D. Molenbeek.

He played for Molenbeek in the 1996–97 Belgian First Division and made 26 League appearances plus a further two in the UEFA Cup, before returning to play in Germany with FC Energie Cottbus. He then transferred to Fulham for the 1998–99 season, making 26 League appearances for the club. At Fulham, Lehmann quickly earn a nickname 'The Porn Star' by the Fulham faithful, due to his "neat moustache and tinted hair his nickname was irresistible and typical of our supporters' sense of humour". After leaving Fulham, he moved to Scottish side Hibernian.

Lehmann scored twice on his debut for Hibernian in a 2–2 draw with Motherwell. He left Hibs under freedom of contract in 2001 and signed for Brighton & Hove Albion. Lehmann drew some press attention for playing with earrings on, which he would cover with white sticking plasters during matches. While he was playing for Brighton, Lehmann was banned by The Football Association from wearing them. He scored once during his spell at Brighton, in a Football League Trophy game against Swansea City.

Lehmann returned to Scotland six months later with Motherwell, where he was one of the players who negotiated a new contract after the club was placed into administration. He played for Motherwell for a further season alongside the young James McFadden in attack.

Following his release from Motherwell signed a lucrative contract with Yokohama FC.

== Coaching career ==
Lehmann took over as coach of lower league side Sportfreunde Düren.

== Honours ==
Fulham

- Football League Second Division: 1998–99
