= Steven Ferguson (footballer, born 1982) =

Scottish footballer

Personal information
- Full name: Steven Ferguson
- Date of birth: 1 April 1982 (age 44)
- Place of birth: Scotland
- Position: Striker

Senior career*
| Years | Team | Apps | (Gls) |
| 199?–2000 | East Fife | 11 | (6) |
| 2000–2003 | Tottenham Hotspur | 0 | (0) |
| 2002–2003 | → Motherwell (loan) | 19 | (2) |
| 2003–2008 | Woking | 113 | (19) |
| 2007 | → AFC Wimbledon (loan) | 21 | (7) |
| 2007–2008 | AFC Wimbledon | 43 | (10) |
| 2008 | Billericay Town | ? | (?) |
| 2008–2010 | Tonbridge Angels | ? | (?) |
| 2010 | Bromley | ? | (?) |
| 2010–2011 | Harlow Town | ? | (?) |
| 2011 | Thurrock | ? | (?) |
| 2011– | Tooting & Mitcham United | | |
- * Club domestic league appearances and goals as of 28 December 2011

Steven Ferguson (born 1 April 1982) is a Scottish footballer.

== Career ==
Ferguson started his career at East Fife, scoring six goals in 11 appearances. He then made the move to Premier League club Tottenham Hotspur, where he would not make a single appearance. During his time at Spurs he was loaned out to Scottish club Motherwell, where he would make 19 appearances (11 from the bench) and scored two goals, including the last goal in the 6–1 win over Hearts at Fir Park.

In 2003, he was released by Tottenham and joined Woking, where he would spend most of his career, making 113 appearances and scoring 19 goals.
