= Andy Scott (Scottish footballer) =

Scottish footballer (born 1985)

Personal information
- Full name: Andrew Scott
- Date of birth: 30 January 1985 (age 41)
- Place of birth: Glasgow, Scotland
- Height: 5 ft 10 in (1.78 m)
- Position: Striker

Team information
- Current team: Shotts Bon Accord

Senior career*
Years	Team	Apps	(Gls)
2002–2004	Motherwell	1	(0)
- Bellshill Athletic
- Cumbernauld United
2008–2011	Alloa Athletic	108	(17)
2011–2012	Albion Rovers	7	(0)
2012–2013	Shotts Bon Accord		
2013–2015	Bo'ness United		
2015–2016	Cumnock Juniors		
2016–	Shotts Bon Accord		
- * Club domestic league appearances and goals as of 16:57, 9 October 2018 (UTC)

Andy Scott (born 30 January 1985) is a Scottish footballer who plays for Shotts Bon Accord in the Scottish Junior Football Association, West Region. He has previously played in the Scottish Premier League for Motherwell.

== Career ==
Scott played for Rangers SABC and Gleniffer Thistle BC before joining the youth system at Motherwell. He made one appearance for the club as a substitute in a Scottish Premier League match against Livingston in 2003, but he was released at the end of the 2003–04 season. After leaving Motherwell, Scott played in Junior football for Bellshill Athletic and then Cumbernauld United. After Scott scored 35 goals for Cumbernauld in the 2006–07 season, Alloa Athletic started to monitor his progress. He signed for the Wasps in January 2008 after a trial period.

Scott scored his first goal for Alloa against Airdrie United in January 2008.

He scored the first goal against first division Clyde in the 2007–08 first division play off semi final.

Scott joined Albion Rovers in the summer of 2011, before moving on to Shotts Bon Accord in February 2012, where he was a member of their 2011–12 Scottish Junior Cup winning side. In the summer of 2013, Scott moved to Bo'ness United, spending two seasons with the East Region side before a move to Cumnock Juniors.

Scott returned to Shotts Bon Accord in the summer of 2016 and had a short spell in interim charge following the departure of Kieran McGuinness. He joined the coaching staff of the club under new manager John McKeown.
