= Barry John Corr =

Scottish footballer

Personal information
- Date of birth: 13 January 1981 (age 45)
- Place of birth: Glasgow, Scotland
- Height: 6 ft 1 in (1.85 m)
- Position: Goalkeeper

Youth career
- 1997–1999: Celtic

Senior career*
Years	Team	Apps	(Gls)
1999–2003	Celtic	1	(0)
2001	→ Queens Park (loan)	12	(0)
2003–2005	Motherwell	11	(0)
2005–2006	Stranraer	36	(0)
2006–2007	Queen of the South	10	(0)
2007	Ayr United	5	(0)
2007–2008	Clydebank		(0)
2008–2009	Yoker	0	(0)
2009	East Stirlingshire (Trial)	1	(0)
Total		76	(0)
- * Club domestic league appearances and goals

Barry John Corr (born 13 January 1981) is a Scottish former footballer who played as a goalkeeper.

== Football career ==
Corr began his senior career with Scottish Premier League club Celtic. He made his first and only appearance for the club when he came on as a substitute for Jonathan Gould against Hearts in April 1999. From there he moved onto another SPL side, Motherwell, after a loan spell with amateur side Queens Park. After his time in Lanarkshire, Corr moved into the Scottish Football League playing for Stranraer, Queen of the South and Ayr United.

After leaving Ayr United, Corr joined Junior side Clydebank before retiring.
