= Khaled Kemas =

Algerian footballer (born 1979)

Personal information
- Date of birth: 1 September 1979 (age 47)
- Place of birth: Créteil, France
- Height: 1.74 m (5 ft 9 in)
- Position: Striker

Youth career
- –1999: AS Le Perreux
- 1999–2001: Paris Saint-Germain

Senior career*
Years	Team	Apps	(Gls)
2001–2002	Dundee	12	(1)
2002–2003	Motherwell	6	(1)
2003–2005	FC Les Lilas		
2005–2006	Créteil-Lusitanos B		
2006–2007	Red Star	25	(7)
2007–2008	Ivry		
2009	Sainte-Geneviève	18	(5)
2009–2010	UJA Alfortville	30	(16)
2010	MC Alger	0	(0)
2010	UJA Alfortville	8	(2)
2011–2012	Créteil-Lusitanos B		

International career
2002	Algeria U23	3	(0)
- * Club domestic league appearances and goals

Khaled Kemas (born 1 September 1979) is a retired professional footballer who played as a striker. Born in France, he represented Algeria at youth level.

== Club career ==
Kemas was born in Créteil, France.

He played on the professional level in the Scottish Premier League for Dundee and Motherwell. For both clubs he scored on his debut; at Dundee he scored on his debut in a defeat to future club Motherwell, and then at Motherwell he scored on his debut in a defeat to Livingston.

On 11 July 2010, Kemas signed a two-year contract with MC Alger. However, he was released from the club the following month after failing to convince head coach Alain Michel of his abilities.
