= Kenny Wright (footballer) =

Scottish footballer

Kenneth Wright
Personal information
- Full name: Kenneth Wright
- Date of birth: 1 August 1985 (age 41)
- Place of birth: Bellshill, Scotland
- Position: Striker

Team information
- Current team: Thorniewood United

Senior career*
Years	Team	Apps	(Gls)
2002–2006	Motherwell	46	(3)
2006–2007	Stranraer	15	(5)
2007–2008	Albion Rovers	19	(16)
2008	Arbroath	3	
2008–2009	Elgin City	23	(9)
2011–2012	Forth Wanderers		
2012	Carluke Rovers		
2012	Shotts Bon Accord		
2012–2013	Forth Wanderers		
2014–	Thorniewood United		
- * Club domestic league appearances and goals as of 18:30, 6 August 2014

Kenneth Wright (born 1 August 1985) is a Scottish footballer who plays as a striker for Thorniewood United in the Scottish Junior Football Association, West Region. He has previously played in the Scottish Premier League for Motherwell.

== Career ==
Wright started his career at local professional club Motherwell in 2002. At the time, the SPL club were giving a lot of young players an opportunity due to administration, forcing a number of cuts. This meant Wright would be one of the fortunate youth players given their chance. However, due to injury, Wright was never able to show the goal-scoring ability that he undoubtedly had, and he was released by the Fir Park club at the end of the 2005–06 season. Wright made just 46 League appearances, scoring three goals (the winning goal against Aberdeen).

On his release from Motherwell, Wright spent three seasons at lower league level, playing for Stranraer, Albion Rovers, Arbroath, and Elgin City.

After a spell playing amateur football in Lanarkshire, latterly with Eddlewood AFC, he joined Forth Wanderers in 2011. Wright had brief spells at Carluke Rovers and Shotts Bon Accord before re-signing for Forth in November 2012

Wright left Forth to return to amateur level with Blantyre Celtic but stepped up to join Thorniewood United in the summer of 2014.
