= David Cowan (footballer, born 1982) =

English footballer

Personal information
- Full name: David Cowan
- Date of birth: 5 March 1982 (age 44)
- Place of birth: Penrith, England
- Position: Defender

Youth career
- –2002: Newcastle United

Senior career*
Years	Team	Apps	(Gls)
2002–2004	Motherwell	17	(0)
2004–2005	St Johnstone	10	(0)
2005–2007	Ross County	24	(0)
2007–2008	Gretna	14	(2)
2008–2010	Dundee	36	(0)
2011	Livingston	9	(0)
2011	East Fife	3	(0)
2011–2014	Cowdenbeath	40	(0)
2014	East Fife	9	(0)
Total		162	(2)
- * Club domestic league appearances and goals as of 22:43, 8 May 2020 (UTC)

David Cowan (born 5 March 1982 in Whitehaven, Cumbria) is an English former footballer who played as a defender for Newcastle United, Motherwell, St Johnstone, Ross County, Gretna, Dundee, Livingston, East Fife and Cowdenbeath.

== Youth career ==
Cowan started his career with Newcastle United at Academy and reserve level before being released in 2002.

== Career ==
After trial spells at Walsall, Livingston, Wigan Athletic and Oldham Athletic, Cowan joined Motherwell but was to suffer a double ankle fracture in a game against Celtic that sidelined him for a year and put his playing career in some doubt.

Recovering fitness but failing to get back into the first team, he joined St Johnstone in January 2005, before an 18-month stint in the Highland town of Dingwall with Ross County.

Returning to England for an unsuccessful trial at Blackpool, Cowan signed for Gretna.

Snapped up by Dundee in January 2008, within days of his former Newcastle reserve colleague Colin McMenamin who made the same switch from Gretna, he became a regular starter at Dens Park, earning an extended two-year deal. He was released by the club on 4 May 2010, along with eight other players.

In February 2011, after recovering from an injury suffered whilst with Dundee that had kept him out for over a year, he joined Livingston. He was released at the end of the season and after a short trial spell at East Fife, signed for Cowdenbeath on a short-term deal until January 2012.

On 31 January 2014, Cowan was released by Cowdenbeath.

Cowan rejoined East Fife on 7 February 2014. He was released by the club in May 2014 following their relegation to Scottish League Two.
