= Shaun Fagan =

Scottish footballer

Personal information
- Full name: Shaun Michael Fagan
- Date of birth: 22 March 1984 (age 42)
- Place of birth: Bellshill, Scotland
- Position: Midfielder

Team information
- Current team: St. Roch's

Senior career*
Years	Team	Apps	(Gls)
2000–2007	Motherwell	72	(3)
2006–2007	→ Stenhousemuir (loan)	4	(1)
2007	Galway United	9	(0)
2008	Clyde	3	(1)
2008	Stirling Albion	1	(0)
2008–2011	East Fife	46	(0)
2011–2012	Stirling Albion	22	(0)
2013–	St. Roch's		

International career
2004	Scotland U21	1	(0)
- * Club domestic league appearances and goals as of 9 August 2013

Shaun Michael Fagan (born 22 March 1984 in Bellshill) is a Scottish footballer who plays for St. Roch's in the Scottish Junior Football Association, West Region. He has previously played in the Scottish Premier League for Motherwell.

== Career ==
Fagan started his career with Motherwell, and made 84 appearances for them. He had a short loan stint at Stenhousemuir between December and January 2007. He was released by Motherwell at the end of the season, and joined Irish club Galway United in July 2007, where he made 9 appearances.

Fagan moved back to Scotland in January 2008, and signed for Clyde. He scored a goal in his Clyde debut, a penalty in a 3–1 defeat by Stirling Albion on 2 February 2008. He only made two more appearances for Clyde, and was released in May 2008. He signed for East Fife in September 2008.

He joined Stirling Albion for a second spell in June 2011 making his second club debut on 23 July in a 3–1 victory over Deveronvale in a Scottish Challenge Cup first round match.

Fagan worked as an assistant to Stirling manager Greig McDonald. He temporarily took charge of the team for their 1–0 victory against Rangers in October 2012, as McDonald was being married that day. He parted ways with the club the following month.

Fagan joined Junior side St. Roch's as a player in August 2013.

== See also ==
- Clyde F.C. season 2007-08
