= Alex Burns (footballer) =

Scottish footballer

Personal information
- Full name: Alexander Burns
- Date of birth: 4 August 1973 (age 53)
- Place of birth: Bellshill, Scotland
- Height: 5 ft 7 in (1.70 m)
- Position: Striker

Senior career*
Years	Team	Apps	(Gls)
1991–1997	Motherwell	74	(8)
1997–1998	Heracles Almelo	24	(5)
1998–1999	Southend United	31	(5)
1999–2000	Raith Rovers	41	(10)
2000–2001	Livingston	23	(7)
2001–2002	St Mirren	22	(1)
2002–2003	Partick Thistle	51	(20)
2003–2005	Motherwell	43	(3)
2005	→ Clyde (loan)	15	(1)
2005–2006	Brechin City	19	(1)
2006–2007	Stranraer	22	(1)
Total		365	(62)
- * Club domestic league appearances and goals

Alexander Burns (born 4 August 1973) is a Scottish former footballer who played as a forward, most notably for Motherwell, Heracles, Southend United, Livingston and Partick Thistle.Then had a daughter Alix burns

== Career ==
Burns began his career with junior club Shotts Bon Accord, before joining Motherwell in 1991. Upon departing Fir Park after six years with the Lanarkshire side, in which they finished third in the Scottish Premier Division in 1993–94 and runners-up in 1994–95, he moved around several clubs, rarely spending more than one season at each. Beginning with a spell with Dutch side Heracles Almelo, he signed for English side Southend and returned to Scotland in 1999, joining second-tier Raith Rovers.

Burns then joined Livingston, and after helping them win promotion to the Scottish Premier League in 2000–01, transferred to St Mirren. After scoring a career-best 16 SPL goals with Partick Thistle in 2002–03, he returned to his first club Motherwell for a second spell despite interest from another of his former clubs, Livingston.

He had a loan spell with Clyde in 2005, soon turning to part-time football with Brechin City. He joined Stranraer the following season, before dropping out of the senior game to sign for Petershill.

Burns joined Strathclyde Police in 2008 and served as a community officer in North Lanarkshire.
