= David Partridge =

Footballer (born 1978)

Personal information
- Full name: David Alexander Partridge
- Date of birth: 26 November 1978 (age 47)
- Place of birth: Westminster, London, England
- Position: Central defender

Senior career*
Years	Team	Apps	(Gls)
1996–1999	West Ham United	0	(0)
1999–2002	Dundee United	62	(0)
2002	→ Leyton Orient (loan)	8	(0)
2002–2005	Motherwell	86	(2)
2005–2007	Bristol City	11	(0)
2006	→ Milton Keynes Dons (loan)	18	(0)
2006	→ Leyton Orient (loan)	1	(0)
2007	→ Brentford (loan)	0	(0)
2007	→ Swindon Town (loan)	0	(0)
2007–2008	Brentford	0	(0)
2008–2010	St Patrick's Athletic	52	(1)
2010–2011	Cambridge United	19	(0)
2011	Thurrock	4	(0)
Total		261	(3)

International career
- Wales U16
- Wales U18
1997	Wales U21	1	(0)
2005–2006	Wales	7	(0)
- * Club domestic league appearances and goals

David William Partridge (born 26 November 1978) is retired professional footballer who played as a central defender. Partridge's club career included spells at Dundee United and Motherwell in Scotland, Bristol City in England and St. Patrick's Athletic in Ireland, as well as several other clubs on loan. He ended his career in English non-League football, with Cambridge United and Thurrock. Born in England, he represented Wales in international football, making seven appearances.

== Club career ==
=== Dundee United ===
Born in Westminster, London, Partridge joined West Ham United as an apprentice in August 1996 but did not break into the first-team and joined Dundee United for a fee of £40,000 in March 1999. An agreed move to Plymouth Argyle, where he would have linked up with his former Dundee United manager, Paul Sturrock, in August 2001, fell through and Partridge eventually joined English Division Three side Leyton Orient in January 2002 on a three-month loan, having made 75 league and cup appearances for Dundee United in three seasons. Having made three appearances, Partridge was sent off on his home debut for Leyton Orient, after fracturing the jaw of Swansea City defender Terry Evans with a deliberate elbow. Following his return, he made a further four appearances for Leyton Orient in his loan spell.

=== Motherwell ===
Partridge joined Motherwell on a free transfer in July 2002. Manager Terry Butcher had spotted Partridge playing for West Ham reserves and brought him to Dundee United where he was working at the time. When Butcher took over at Motherwell, he made Partridge his first signing. His performances for Motherwell led to him being called up for the Wales national football squad in January 2005. Butcher said of Partridge, "It just shows what players can achieve if they knuckle down and work hard [...] He's a left-footed centre-half and there are not many good ones about. If you do well at Scottish Premier level, which is still a good standard, then you have a great chance to show what you can do on the international stage. David is in a good position to go on from here and establish himself with Wales, I've always had a good feeling about him." Partridge made a total of 86 league and cup appearances in three seasons for Motherwell.

=== Bristol City ===
Partridge joined Bristol City for £150,000 at the start of the 2005–2006 season, signing a three-year contract. Manager Brian Tinnion described him as "..a left-sided central defender, a tough character who will inspire." He made 13 league and cup appearances for Bristol City in the 2005–2006 season but following the arrival of Gary Johnson as manager and a breach of club discipline for which Partridge and other players were fined two weeks' wages after being arrested on suspicion of violent disorder following an incident in a nightclub in October 2005, he was sent out on loan to Milton Keynes Dons in January 2006 until the end of the season. He was transfer listed in May 2006 after returning from Milton Keynes Dons and joined Leyton Orient on a one-month loan at the start of the 2006–2007 season with a view to a permanent transfer. However, in September 2006, he was sentenced to two months in prison alongside teammates Bradley Orr and Steve Brooker for his part in the "drink-fuelled brawl" at a nightclub in the previous October. He was released after one month but was unable to win back a first-team place at Bristol City and joined Brentford on a one-month loan in January 2007. On his third appearance for Brentford against Yeovil, he was sent off for headbutting and subsequently his loan spell was not extended. Partridge returned to Bristol City and then joined Swindon Town on a one-month loan in March 2007. His lack of fitness however meant that he did not make an appearance for Swindon and he returned to Bristol City the following month. A broken hand suffered during the summer of 2007 meant that he missed all of pre-season training and was ruled out of the start of the 2007–08 season. His contract with Bristol City was terminated by mutual consent in August 2007.

=== Brentford ===
Partridge signed a one-month contract at Brentford on 20 December 2007 as a free agent. However, he made no appearances for the Football League Two side.

=== St Patrick's Athletic ===
Partridge signed for League of Ireland runners-up St Patrick's Athletic on 29 January 2008. Initially used at left back, he soon settled into a centre-half spot where he impressed greatly as a solid, no-nonsense defender with very good distribution of the ball out of defence. Injury and suspensions have halted his progress with the Saints though he returned to the first team for the 2009 season.

=== Non-League football ===
Partridge was signed by Conference National side Cambridge United in January 2010 as a replacement for the departing Wayne Hatswell.

He was released by Cambridge at the end of the 2010–11 season, and joined Thurrock at the start of the 2011–12 season.

== International career ==
Partridge represented Wales at Under-18 and Under-16 level, as well as securing an Under-21 cap against Turkey in 1997. He was called up to the senior squad and made his debut in a 2–0 friendly win over Hungary in February 2005. He went on to make further appearances in Wales' 2006 World Cup qualifying campaign against Austria, Slovenia England, Poland and Northern Ireland. His last appearance for Wales was the friendly game against Trinidad & Tobago in May 2006.
