= Scott Leitch =

Scottish footballer and coach

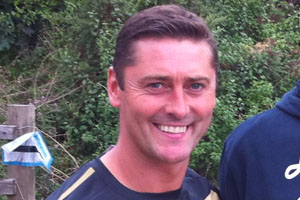

Personal information
- Full name: Donald Scott Leitch
- Date of birth: 6 October 1969 (age 57)
- Place of birth: Motherwell, Scotland
- Position: Midfielder

Youth career
- 1986–1987: Motherwell

Senior career*
Years	Team	Apps	(Gls)
1989–1990	Shettleston		
1990–1993	Dunfermline Athletic	99	(16)
1993–1996	Heart of Midlothian	55	(2)
1996–2000	Swindon Town	124	(1)
2000–2006	Motherwell	128	(1)

Managerial career
- 2006–2007: Ross County
- 2007–2009: Motherwell (assistant)
- 2009–2010: Aberdeen (assistant)
- 2013–2017: Motherwell (academy director)
- * Club domestic league appearances and goals

Donald Scott Leitch (born 6 October 1969) is a Scottish former football player and coach, who played as a midfielder. He played professionally for Dunfermline Athletic, Heart of Midlothian, Swindon Town and Motherwell, and managed Ross County.

== Career ==
Leitch began his playing career in 1989 at junior club Shettleston before turning professional with Dunfermline Athletic in April 1990. After three years at Dunfermline he joined Heart of Midlothian, where he remained for another three years before moving to England with Swindon Town in a £15,000 transfer. Leitch returned to Scotland in 2000 with home-town team Motherwell where he played 128 league games, scoring 1 goal.

A succession of injury problems prompted Leitch to retire as player in 2006 and turn to management with Ross County, where he was officially appointed on 18 April 2006. He guided the club to their first national trophy in November 2006, when they won the Scottish Challenge Cup against Clyde, however the club were also relegated from the Scottish First Division the same season.

On 30 April 2007, Leitch resigned as manager of Ross County after the club's relegation. In June that year he became assistant manager to Mark McGhee at Motherwell. In June 2009 Leitch became the assistant manager of Aberdeen when McGhee became their manager. Leitch was sacked by Aberdeen on 1 December 2010 along with manager McGhee and coach Colin Meldrum after a poor run of results left them only spared from the foot of the Scottish Premier League by goal difference; they also oversaw the SPL's heaviest ever defeat when Celtic beat Aberdeen 9–0. Leitch was then academy director at Motherwell from November 2013 to December 2017.

Leitch was appointed as academy director at Hamilton Academical in July 2025.

== Personal life ==
Leitch has two sons, Jack and Robbie, who have both played for Motherwell's youth teams. Jack left school in summer 2011 to sign a contract with Motherwell. After serious injury hampered his progress, he moved to Airdrieonians in 2016. Having been part of the team which won the 2015-16 Scottish Youth Cup, he also left the club in 2016, moving to Burnley.

== Honours ==
=== Manager ===
Ross County

- Scottish Challenge Cup: 2006–07

== Notes ==
- Leitch glad to be back at Well, stv interview 18 June 2007.
