= List of Motherwell F.C. players =

This is a list footballers who have played for Motherwell Football Club.

== Key ==
- The list is sorted by the year the player joined the club. If more than one player joined in the same year then they are sorted alphabetically.

Club years

- Counted as the years the player signed for, and left the club.

Appearances and goals

Current Motherwell player
Played for Motherwell on loan

International career

- Players who made international appearances only have the highest level at which they played listed.
- A player's senior international team is sourced to National Football Teams

== Players with 100 or more appearances ==
As of match played 7 November 2026

Name	Years	League apps	League goals	Cup apps	Cup goals	League Cup apps	League Cup goals	Europe apps	Europe goals	Other apps (Note: Includes Relegation play-offs)	Other goals	Total apps	Total goals	International Career
Walter Cowan	1893–1895, 1897–1902	116	23			-	-	-	-	-	-	153	33	-
Hugh McNeil	1899–1900, 1901, 1904–1914	267	6			-	-	-	-	-	-	300	6	-
John McLean	1904–1910	132	0			-	-	-	-	-	-	140	0	-
George Nicol	1904–1915	272	47			-	-	-	-	-	-	296	51	-
James Rattray	1906–1910	101	0			-	-	-	-	-	-	106	0	-
Colin Hampton	1909–1914	134	0			-	-	-	-	-	-	151	0	Scottish League XI
Francis McStay	1911–1919	214	6			-	-	-	-	-	-	226	7	-
Duncan Finlayson	1912–1921	157	22			-	-	-	-	-	-	158	22	-
Robert Stewart	1916–1925	272	8			-	-	-	-	-	-	292	9	-
Hughie Ferguson	1916–1925	299	284			-	-	-	-	-	-	322	311	Scottish League XI
Craig Brown	1916–1917, 1919, 1919–1924	196	11			-	-	-	-	-	-	222	14	Scottish League XI
Robert Gardiner	1917–1921	112	15			-	-	-	-	-	-	113	15	-
Willie Rankin	1917–1924	230	54			-	-	-	-	-	-	249	56	Scottish League XI
Bob Ferrier	1917–1937	626	255			-	-	-	-	-	-	697	270	Scottish League XI
Willie Paterson	1919–1925	126	1			-	-	-	-	-	-	138	1	-
James Jackson	1919–1923	97	1			-	-	-	-	-	-	102	1	Scottish League XI
Willie MacFadyen	1921–1936	378	235			-	-	-	-	-	-	421	267	Scotland
Dick Little	1922–1929	168	11			-	-	-	-	-	-	181	12	-
John Johnman	1923–1932	249	1			-	-	-	-	-	-	274	1	-
George Stevenson	1923–1939	510	169			-	-	-	-	-	-	573	197	Scotland
Allan McClory	1924–1937	427	0			-	-	-	-	-	-	472	0	Scotland
Allan Craig	1924–1933	294	3			-	-	-	-	-	-	325	3	Scotland
Willie Frame	1924–1931, 1938–1939	183	0			-	-	-	-	-	-	198	0	-
David Thackeray	1925–1928	110	4			-	-	-	-	-	-	117	4	Scottish League XI
John McMenemy	1928–1936	261	74			-	-	-	-	-	-	296	83	Scotland
John Murdoch	1928–1933	142	50			-	-	-	-	-	-	166	65	Scotland
Willie Dowall	1929–1935	118	43			-	-	-	-	-	-	127	47	-
Hugh Wales	1929–1939	317	15			-	-	-	-	-	-	364	20	Scotland
Willie Telfer	1929–1939	284	1			-	-	-	-	-	-	325	3	Scotland
Ben Ellis	1930–1939	286	20			-	-	-	-	-	-	328	25	Wales
John Blair	1931–1944	246	2			-	-	-	-	-	-	275	2	Scotland
Tommy McKenzie	1931–1942	144	2			-	-	-	-	-	-	164	3	Scottish League XI
Duncan Ogilvie	1932–1936, 1936–1941	193	72			-	-	-	-	-	-	225	52	Scotland
William Grant	1935–1939	100	1			-	-	-	-	-	-	108	1	-
Hutton Bremner	1935–1945	119	35			-	-	-	-	-	-	139	43	-
Don Macleod	1938–1952	145	2					-	-	-	-	198	5	-
Willie Kilmarnock	1939–1956	296	11					-	-	-	-	418	16	Scotland
John Johnston	1941–1955	205	0					-	-	-	-	286	0	-
Andy Paton	1942–1958	302	0					-	-	-	-	420	1	Scotland
Archie Shaw	1942–1958	256	0					-	-	-	-	362	3	Scottish League XI
Willie Redpath	1946–1956	227	15					-	-	-	-	337	26	Scottish League XI
Gordon Bremner	1946–1951	99	17					-	-	-	-	122	20	Scottish League XI
Wilson Humphries	1946–1956	199	68					-	-	-	-	284	105	Scotland
Jimmy Watson	1946–1952	147	48					-	-	-	-	217	75	Scotland
Johnny Aitkenhead	1949–1957	170	50					-	-	-	-	256	83	Scottish League XI
Jim Forrest	1949–1960	214	57					-	-	-	-	309	91	Scotland
Archie Kelly	1949–1953	104	66					-	-	-	-	152	95	-
Charlie Aitken	1950–1966	314	38					-	-	-	-	314	38	Scotland B Scottish League XI
Charlie Cox	1951–1958	88	4					-	-	-	-	131	9	-
Tommy Sloan	1951–1957	112	35					-	-	-	-	160	54	-
Pat Quinn	1955–1962	196	86					-	-	-	-	251	119	Scotland
Bert McCann	1956–1965	247	22					-	-	-	-	331	27	Scotland
Ian Gardiner	1956–1959	95	48					-	-	-	-	119	64	Scotland
Ian St John	1956–1961	113	79					-	-	-	-	144	105	Scotland
John Martis	1957–1969	297	2					-	-	-	-	400	2	Scotland
Andy Weir	1957–1968	202	44					-	-	-	-	285	61	Scotland
Willie Hunter	1957–1967	228	43					-	-	-	-	301	64	Scotland
Bobby McCallum	1958–1968	163	11					-	-	-	-	225	14	Scottish League XI
Pat Delaney	1959–1966	164	22					-	-	-	-	229	40	-
Willie McCallum	1959–1973	272	1					-	-	-	-	352	1	-
Bobby Roberts	1959–1963	91	27					-	-	-	-	128	42	Scottish League XI
George Murray	1962–1968	127	16					-	-	-	-	127+	16+	Scottish League XI
Joe McBride	1962–1965	90	56					-	-	-	-	131	88	Scottish League XI
Peter McCloy	1964–1970	137	0					-	-	-	-	184	0	Scotland
Davie Whiteford	1965–1973	197	13					-	-	-	-	259	16	-
Bobby Campbell	1965–1971	161	36					-	-	-	-	197	46	-
Dixie Deans	1965–1971	152	78					-	-	-	-	198	89	Scotland
Keith MacRae	1967–1974	126	1					-	-	-	-	170	2	Scotland U23; Scottish League XI
Tom Forsyth	1967–1972	150	17					-	-	-	-	206	23	Scotland
Joe Wark	1968–1984	464	14					-	-	-	-	539	18	Scottish League XI
Tom Donnelly	1968–1971	74	10					-	-	-	-	100	13	-
Bobby Watson	1969–1976	182	3					-	-	-	-	256	8	Scotland
Willie Pettigrew	1972–1979	156	80					-	-	-	-	216	102	Scotland
Peter Millar	1972–1979	179	17					-	-	-	-	238	22	Scottish League XI
Willie Watson	1973–1978	127	2					-	-	-	-	173	3	-
Bobby Graham	1973–1977	132	37					-	-	-	-	179	48	-
Stewart MacLaren	1974–1979	123	5					-	-	-	-	159	7	-
Gregor Stevens	1974–1979, 1984–1985	147	19					-	-	-	-	189	19	Scottish League XI
Peter Marinello	1975–1978	89	12					-	-	-	-	117	21	Scottish League XI
Willie McVie	1975–1979	87	2					-	-	-	-	122	2	Scotland U23
Vic Davidson	1975–1978	95	19					-	-	-	-	128	35	-
Ian Clinging	1977–1983	114	21					-	-	-	-	135	30	-
Joe Carson	1978–1984	126	8					-	-	-	-	158	10	-
Stuart Rafferty	1978–1984	89	17					-	-	-	-	110	18	-
John Gahagan	1979–1990	284	35					-	-	-	-	337	43	-
Brian McLaughlin	1979–1982	116	37					-	-	-	-	129	42	-
Willie Irvine	1979–1982	120	49					-	-	-	-	138	51	-
Andy Dornan	1982–1986	92	4					-	-	-	-	112	4	-
Andy Harrow	1982–1986	103	19					-	-	-	-	125	29	-
Ally Maxwell	1983–1991	135	0					-	-	-	-	153	0	-
Tom Boyd	1983–1991	252	6					-	-	-	-	301	7	Scotland
Fraser Wishart	1983–1989, 1996–1997	172	5					-	-	-	-	196	6	-
Derek Murray	1984–1988	95	5					-	-	-	-	95	5	-
Chris McCart	1985–1997	267	6					-	-	-	-	305	8	Scotland B
Craig Paterson	1986–1991	158	8					-	-	-	-	183	8	Scotland U21
John Philliben	1986–1998	302	7					-	-	-	-	345	8	-
Dougie Arnott	1986–1998	240	58					-	-	-	-	277	70	-
Steve Kirk	1986–1995	301	63					-	-	-	-	324	84	-
Tom McAdam	1986–1989	99	3					-	-	-	-	113	3	-
Jamie Dolan	1987–1997	194	5					-	-	-	-	223	6	-
Bobby Russell	1987–1992	131	15					-	-	-	-	152	18	Scotland U21
Davie Cooper	1989–1993	157	17					-	-	-	-	176	18	Scotland
Luc Nijholt	1990–1993	96	5					-	-	-	-	113	6	-
Ian Angus	1990–1994	87	8					-	-	-	-	102	10	-
Phil O'Donnell	1990–1994, 2004–2007	201	23	15	2	14	2	3	0	-	-	233	27	Scotland
Brian Martin	1991–1998	237	10					-	-	-	-	273	11	Scotland
Alex Burns	1991–1997, 2003–2005	117	11					-	-	-	-	125	14	Scotland
Rob McKinnon	1992–1996	152	8					-	-	-	-	175	8	Scotland
Steve McMillan	1993–2001	152	6					-	-	-	-	175	6	Scotland U21
Billy Davies	1993–1998	116	9					-	-	-	-	137	11	-
Paul Lambert	1993–1996	103	6					5	0	-	-	119	7	Scotland
Tommy Coyne	1993–1998	134	57					-	-	-	-	156	61	Republic of Ireland
Stevie Woods	1994–2003	142	0					-	-	-	-	160	0	-
Eddie May	1994–1999	109	5					-	-	-	-	128	5	Scotland U21
Lee McCulloch	1994–2001	124	21	15	4	7	2	1	0	-	-	147	27	-
Stephen Craigan	1995–2000, 2003–2012	332	5					-	-	-	-	391	7	Northern Ireland
Simo Valakari	1996–2000	105	0					-	-	-	-	119	0	Finland
Derek Adams	1998–2004	159	19	13	3	6	1	-	-	-	-	178	23	-
Steven Hammell	1999–2006, 2008–2018	497	4	32	0	31	0	21	1	2	0	583	5	Scotland
Keith Lasley	1999–2004, 2006–2017	413	19	29	0	23	4	20	0	2	0	487	23	-
Martyn Corrigan	2000–2008	243	6					-	-	-	-	272	6	Scotland B
Scott Leitch	2000–2006	128	1					-	-	-	-	144	1	-
Stephen Pearson	2000–2004, 2015–2016, 2017	130	21	7	2	3	1	0	0	2	0	142	24	Scotland
James McFadden	2000–2003, 2013–2014, 2015–2017	112	37	8	5	2	2	1	0	-	-	123	44	Scotland
David Clarkson	2002–2009, 2015–2016	226	49	18	3	15	4	2	0	-	-	261	56	Scotland
Marc Fitzpatrick	2004–2011	121	4	11	0	8	1	3	0	-	-	143	5	Scotland U21
Jim Paterson	2004–2008	108	5	4	0	10	1	-	-	-	-	122	6	Scotland U21
Scott McDonald	2004–2007, 2015–2017	191	66	10	4	16	5	-	-	2	0	219	75	Australia
Richie Foran	2004–2007	90	23	3	1	12	11	-	-	-	-	105	35	Republic of Ireland U21
Graeme Smith	2005–2009	127	0	10	0	8	0	2	0	-	-	147	0	Scotland B
Paul Quinn	2005–2011	161	3	8	0	12	1	2	0	-	-	183	4	Scotland U21
Mark Reynolds	2005–2011	166	6	11	0	11	0	14	0	-	-	202	6	Scotland B
Steven McGarry	2006–2010	89	3	6	0	4	1	4	0	-	-	103	4	Scotland U21
Jamie Murphy	2006–2013	176	34	14	8	7	1	18	7	-	-	215	50	Scotland U21
John Sutton	2008–2011, 2013–2015	174	66	11	8	6	0	17	3	1	1	209	78	-
Tom Hateley	2009–2013	148	10	12	1	8	1	9	1	-	-	177	13	-
Shaun Hutchinson	2009–2014	121	7	9	1	6	0	8	1	-	-	144	9	-
Steve Jennings	2009–2012	93	2	7	1	5	0	8	0	-	-	113	3	-
Chris Humphrey	2009–2013	132	8	12	1	7	0	12	0	-	-	163	9	Jamaica
Darren Randolph	2010–2013	111	0	10	0	5	0	10	0	-	-	136	0	Republic of Ireland
Stephen McManus	2013–2017	135	6	5	0	10	0	4	1	2	0	156	7	Scotland
Chris Cadden	2013–2019	115	6	6	0	18	6	0	0	0	0	139	12	Scotland
Lionel Ainsworth	2014, 2014–2017	122	23	2	0	10	1	2	1	2	2	138	27	England U19
Carl McHugh	2016–2019	82	3	6	1	16	0	-	-	-	-	104	4	Republic of Ireland U21
Richard Tait	2016–2020	111	3	9	0	22	2	-	-	-	-	142	5	-
Allan Campbell	2016–2021	135	14	10	2	12	0	3	0	-	-	160	16	Scotland U21
Liam Grimshaw	2015–2016, 2017–2022	115	1	5	0	12	0	2	0	-	-	134	1	England U18
Louis Moult	2015–2018, 2022–2023	91	39	3	2	11	10	-	-	-	-	105	51	-
Liam Kelly	2021, 2021–2024	132	0	10	0	10	0	2	0	-	-	154	0	Scotland
Stephen O'Donnell	2020–Present	196	2	11	1	22	2	4	1	-	-	233	5	Scotland
Ricki Lamie	2020–2024	80	3	6	1	9	1	5	0	-	-	100	5	-
Bevis Mugabi	2019–2024	109	7	6	0	6	0	4	0	-	-	125	7	Uganda
Callum Slattery	2021–2026	126	16	6	0	14	2	2	0	-	-	148	18	England U20
Tony Watt	2020–2022, 2024–2025	86	14	4	2	7	2	3	2	-	-	100	20	Scotland
Paul McGinn	2022–Present	111	2	5	0	13	0	2	0	-	-	115	2	Scotland

== Players with 25–99 appearances ==
As of match played 7 November 2026

Name	Years	League apps	League goals	Cup apps	Cup goals	League Cup apps	League Cup goals	Europe apps	Europe goals	Other apps (Note: Includes Relegation play-offs)	Other goals	Total apps	Total goals	International Career
Abraham Wales	1898–1900, 1901–1903	54	12			-	-	-	-	-	-	74	13	-
Andy Burton	1904–1905	25	6			-	-	-	-	-	-	25+	6+	-
Andrew Donaldson	1906–1908	63	15			-	-	-	-	-	-	63+	15+	-
John Waugh	1914–1916	68	23			-	-	-	-	-	-	68+	23+	-
Robert McSkimming	1916–1919	90	3			-	-	-	-	-	-	90	3	Scotland
Bert McIntosh	1917–1919	63	2			-	-	-	-	-	-	63	2	-
Hugh McNeil Jr	1926–1930	85	1			-	-	-	-	-	-	92	1	-
Sandy Hunter	1928–1932	81	0			-	-	-	-	-	-	90	0	-
Willie Moffat	1931–1932	27	14			-	-	-	-	-	-	30	15	-
William Allan	1933–1936	30	0			-	-	-	-	-	-	30+	0+	-
Jimmy Crapnell	1933–1937	37	0			-	-	-	-	-	-	37+	0+	Scotland
Alex Stewart	1936–1938	65	51			-	-	-	-	-	-	72	57	Scottish League XI
Jimmy Brown	1946–1947	18	16					-	-	-	-	29	24	Scotland
Willie McCall	1948–1950	28	0					-	-	-	-	37	0	-
Alex Bain	1954–1957	23	10					-	-	-	-	37	21	-
Sammy Reid	1956–1960	60	19					-	-	-	-	74	24	-
John McPhee	1957–1962	74	16					-	-	-	-	95	26	-
Tommy Coakley	1963–1966	23	1					-	-	-	-	33	2	-
Walter Carlyle	1964–1965	26	7					-	-	-	-	30	9	-
Benny Cairney	1965–1968	43	7					-	-	-	-	54	11	-
Gus Moffat	1965–1968	41	6					-	-	-	-	41	6	-
Alan Mackay	1967–1969	39	0					-	-	-	-	45	0	-
Billy Ritchie	1970–1973	13	0					-	-	-	-	29	0	Scotland
Sam Goodwin	1972–1975	64	2					-	-	-	-	85	2	-
Colin McAdam	1975–1978	62	3					-	-	-	-	83	3	-
Jimmy Lindsay	1976–1979	21	1					-	-	-	-	26	1	Scotland U21
Jimmy O'Rourke	1976–1978	61	14					-	-	-	-	75	16	-
Joe Smith	1978–1981	57	0					-	-	-	-	63	0	Scotland U23
Chic McLelland	1979–1981	51	1					-	-	-	-	57	2	Scotland U23
Albert Kidd	1979–1981	53	18					-	-	-	-	60	19	-
Brian Coyne	1980–1983	34	2					-	-	-	-	40	3	-
Alfie Conn Jr.	1981–1984	27	3					-	-	-	-	36	5	Scotland
Gary McAllister	1981–1985	59	6					-	-	-	-	70	8	-
Brian McClair	1981–1983, 1998	51	15	2	1	12	4	-	-	-	-	65	20	Scotland
Tommy O'Hara	1981–1983	54	0					-	-	-	-	63	0	United States
Nicky Walker	1982–1983	31	0					-	-	-	-	40	0	-
Bobby Flavell	1982–1983	32	6					-	-	-	-	36	6	-
Ally Mauchlen	1982–1985	76	1					-	-	-	-	88	5	-
Jóhannes Eðvaldsson	1982–1984	54	6					-	-	-	-	65	6	Iceland
Ian Alexander	1983–1985	24	2					-	-	-	-	27	3	-
Paul McFadden	1983–1986	22	4					-	-	-	-	27	4	-
John Gardiner	1984–1987	78	0					-	-	-	-	98	0	-
Rab Stewart	1984–1985	33	10					-	-	-	-	39	12	-
Andy Walker	1984–1987	76	17					-	-	-	-	92	20	Scotland U21
John Reilly	1985–1987	56	12					-	-	-	-	67	17	-
Paul Smith	1986–1988	78	13					-	-	-	-	94	16	-
Nick Cusack	1986–1988	77	17					-	-	-	-	87	24	-
Ray Farningham	1986–1989	76	12					-	-	-	-	86	14	-
Paul Kinnaird	1987–1988	34	0					-	-	-	-	39	0	-
Steve Cowan	1987–1990	51	11					-	-	-	-	56	12	Scotland U18
Colin O'Neill	1988–1992	64	4					-	-	-	-	79	7	Northern Ireland
George Burley	1989–1991, 1993–1994	59	0					-	-	-	-	64	1	Scotland
Joe McLeod	1990–1993	46	1					-	-	-	-	49	2	Scotland U21
Iain Ferguson	1990–1993	51	10					-	-	-	-	67	16	Scotland U21
Paul McGrillen	1990–1995	87	13					-	-	-	-	96	16	Scotland U21
Sieb Dijkstra	1991–1994	80	0					-	-	-	-	87	0	-
Billy Thomson	1991–1994	52	0					-	-	-	-	59	0	Scotland
Neil Simpson	1991–1993	33	1					-	-	-	-	38	1	Scotland
Rab Shannon	1993–1995	68	3					-	-	-	-	78	4	Scotland U21
Miodrag Krivokapić	1993–1996	71	1					-	-	-	-	78	1	Yugoslavia
Scott Howie	1994–1998	69	0					1	0	-	-	79	0	Scotland U21
Greig Denham	1994–2000	47	0					-	-	-	-	59	0	-
Shaun McSkimming	1994–1998	63	7					1	0	-	-	72	10	-
Andy Roddie	1994–1997	55	0					1	0	-	-	61	10	Scotland U21
Mitchell van der Gaag	1995–1997	40	7	1	1	1	0	1	0	-	-	43	8	Netherlands U21
John Hendry	1995–1998	36	3					1	0	-	-	37	3	-
Mickey Weir	1996–1998	23	6	2	0	3	0	-	-	-	-	28	6	-
Willie Falconer	1996–1998	58	10	5	0	3	1	-	-	-	-	66	11	-
Kevin Christie	1997–1999	31	0	2	0	3	0	-	-	-	-	36	0	-
Eliphas Shivute	1997–1999	25	3	0	0	1	0	-	-	-	-	26	3	Namibia
Dougie Ramsay	1997–2003	39	2	1	0	2	0	-	-	-	-	42	2	-
Owen Coyle	1997–1999	79	25	9	5	4	4	-	-	-	-	92	34	Republic of Ireland
Andy Goram	1998–2001	57	0	8	0	4	0	-	-	-	-	69	0	Scotland
Jamie McGowan	1998–2000	45	1	4	0	2	0	-	-	-	-	51	1	-
Shaun Teale	1998–2000	47	4	3	0	4	1	-	-	-	-	54	5	-
Michel Doesburg	1998–2000	49	0	6	0	4	0	-	-	-	-	59	0	-
Ged Brannan	1998–2001	81	16	7	2	4	0	-	-	-	-	92	18	-
Pat Nevin	1998–2000	58	2	5	0	3	0	-	-	-	-	66	2	Scotland
Kevin Twaddle	1998–2001	61	7	5	0	1	0	-	-	-	-	67	7	-
John Spencer	1998–1999, 1999–2000	71	20	6	1	4	0	-	-	-	-	81	21	Scotland
Benito Kemble	1999–2001	48	1	1	0	1	0	-	-	-	-	50	1	-
Derek Townsley	1999–2001	54	6	5	0	5	1	-	-	-	-	64	7	-
Stevie Nicholas	1999–2002	60	5	4	0	2	0	-	-	-	-	66	5	-
Don Goodman	1999, 1999–2001	55	9	4	3	5	0	-	-	-	-	64	12	-
Greg Strong	2000, 2000–2002	74	3	2	0	1	1	-	-	-	-	77	4	-
Shaun Fagan	2000–2007	72	3	6	0	6	0	-	-	-	-	84	3	Scotland U21
Stuart Elliott	2000–2002	70	22	2	0	3	0	-	-	-	-	75	23	Northern Ireland
François Dubourdeau	2001–2003	26	0	4	0	0	0	-	-	-	-	30	0	-
Willie Kinniburgh	2001–2008	58	3	3	0	4	0	-	-	-	-	65	3	Scotland U21
Karl Ready	2001–2002	36	4	0	0	1	0	-	-	-	-	37	4	Wales
David Partridge	2002–2005	76	2	4	0	6	1	-	-	-	-	86	3	Wales
Dirk Lehmann	2002–2003	43	9	3	1	2	1	-	-	-	-	48	11	-
Kenny Wright	2002–2006	23	1	1	0	2	1	-	-	-	-	26	2	-
Gordon Marshall	2003–2005	67	0	4	0	6	0	-	-	-	-	77	0	align=left|Scotland
Jason Dair	2003–2004	29	2	2	0	1	0	-	-	-	-	32	2	-
Steven Craig	2003–2004	37	5	2	1	1	1	-	-	-	-	40	7	-
Brian Kerr	2004–2007	79	5	4	1	7	1	-	-	-	-	90	7	Scotland
Kevin McBride	2004–2005, 2005–2007	63	6	2	0	8	2	-	-	-	-	73	8	-
Darren Smith	2008–2012	58	6	8	1	2	0	2	0	-	-	70	7	Scotland U21
Alan McCormack	2005–2006	24	2	1	0	3	0	-	-	-	-	28	2	Republic of Ireland U19
Brian McLean	2005–2006, 2006–2009	55	5	2	0	4	1	-	-	-	-	61	6	Northern Ireland
Jim Hamilton	2005–2006	51	11	1	0	3	1	-	-	-	-	55	12	Scotland U21
Colin Meldrum	2006–2007	24	0	0	0	3	0	-	-	-	-	27	0	Scotland U21
Ross McCormack	2006–2008, 2019	51	10	5	2	5	2	-	-	-	-	61	14	Scotland
Ross Forbes	2007–2012	55	5	5	0	6	1	11	4	-	-	77	10	Scotland U19
Stephen Hughes	2007–2009, 2011–2012	70	2	5	1	2	0	2	0	-	-	79	3	Scotland
Bob McHugh	2007–2015	70	5	5	0	7	2	10	1	-	-	92	8	Scotland U19
Chris Porter	2007–2009	59	23	2	2	4	2	2	0	-	-	67	27	-
Jonathan Page	2008–2012	14	0	4	0	3	2	5	1	-	-	26	3	-
Jim O'Brien	2008–2010	64	4	4	0	2	0	2	0	-	-	72	4	Republic of Ireland U21
Steven Saunders	2008–2013	56	2	3	0	5	0	10	0	-	-	74	2	Scotland
John Ruddy	2009–2010	34	0	1	0	2	0	2	0	-	-	39	1	-
Giles Coke	2009–2010	32	2	1	0	2	0	0	0	-	-	35	2	-
Lukas Jutkiewicz	2009–2010	33	12	1	0	2	0	3	0	-	-	36	12	-
Zaine Francis-Angol	2011–2015	66	3	4	0	3	0	5	0	-	-	78	3	Antigua and Barbuda
Nicky Law	2011–2013	76	10	4	2	3	1	3	0	-	-	86	13	-
Tim Clancy	2011–2012	26	0	3	0	1	0	-	-	-	-	30	0	Republic of Ireland U19
Adam Cummins	2011–2012	26	1	2	0	1	0	3	0	-	-	32	1	-
Omar Daley	2011–2013	39	3	1	1	2	0	2	0	-	-	44	4	Jamaica
Stuart Carswell	2011–2015	88	0	3	0	3	0	5	0	-	-	99	8	-
Michael Higdon	2011–2013	72	40	4	1	3	2	4	0	-	-	83	43	-
Craig Moore	2011–2017	27	1	0	0	1	0	1	0	1	0	31	1	-
Simon Ramsden	2012–2015	69	1	1	0	3	0	8	0	-	-	83	1	-
Fraser Kerr	2012–2013, 2013–2015	54	1	4	0	2	0	6	0	-	-	66	1	Scotland U21
Henrik Ojamaa	2012–2013, 2014–2015	73	14	6	3	2	0	4	0	-	-	85	17	Estonia
Lee Erwin	2012–2015	34	5	1	0	0	0	1	0	2	1	38	6	Scotland U19
Dan Twardzik	2013–2014, 2014–2016	30	0	1	0	1	0	2	0	0	0	34	0	Germany U18
Paul Lawson	2013–2015	20	0	2	0	2	0	2	0	0	0	26	0	Scotland U21|
Jack Leitch	2013–2016	27	0	1	0	3	0	1	0	-	-	32	8	-
Iain Vigurs	2013–2015	47	6	1	0	1	0	3	0	-	-	52	6	Scotland U19
Henri Anier	2013–2014, 2014	33	9	1	0	1	0	2	0	-	-	37	9	Estonia
Craig Reid	2014–2016	34	1	1	0	1	0	2	0	-	-	38	1	Scotland U19
Josh Law	2014–2016	63	0	3	0	3	0	2	2	2	0	73	2	-
Dom Thomas	2014–2017	33	0	1	0	5	0	-	-	-	-	39	0	Scotland U21
Connor Ripley	2015–2016	36	0	2	0	2	0	-	-	-	-	40	0	England U20
Craig Samson	2015–2017	36	0	1	0	5	0	-	-	-	-	42	0	Scotland U21
Kieran Kennedy	2015–2017	22	0	1	0	2	0	-	-	-	-	25	0	England U19
Louis Laing	2015, 2015–2017	26	2	0	0	1	0	-	-	2	0	29	2	England U19
Joe Chalmers	2015–2017	25	0	1	0	6	0	-	-	-	-	32	0	Scotland U21
Marvin Johnson	2015–2016	53	6	2	1	7	3	-	-	2	1	64	11	-
Craig Clay	2016–2017	35	1	1	0	3	0	-	-	-	-	39	1	-
Ryan Bowman	2016–2019	72	10	3	1	11	3	-	-	-	-	86	14	Scotland U21
Jake Hastie	2016–2019, 2020–2021	31	6	3	1	0	0	1	0	-	-	35	7	Scotland U21
Trevor Carson	2017–2021	57	0	5	0	13	0	3	0	-	-	78	0	Northern Ireland
Peter Hartley	2017–2018, 2018–2020	53	4	4	0	8	3	-	-	-	-	65	7	-
Charles Dunne	2017–2021	60	0	6	0	12	1	-	-	-	-	78	1	Republic of Ireland U21
Cédric Kipré	2017–2018	36	1	5	0	11	0	-	-	-	-	52	1	-
Andy Rose	2017–2018	40	2	4	0	13	0	-	-	-	-	57	2	-
Gaël Bigirimana	2017–2019	46	2	3	0	8	1	-	-	-	-	57	3	Burundi
Elliott Frear	2017–2019	60	3	3	0	11	5	-	-	-	-	74	8	-
Barry Maguire	2017–2024	59	1	3	0	12	1	4	0	-	-	78	2	Scotland U21
David Turnbull	2017–2020	39	16	2	0	0	0	0	-	-	-	41	16	Scotland U21
Craig Tanner	2017–2020	26	6	3	2	7	1	-	-	-	-	36	9	England U16
James Scott	2017–2020	36	4	1	0	5	3	-	-	-	-	42	7	Scotland U21
Tom Aldred	2018, 2018–2019	54	4	6	0	2	0	-	-	-	-	62	4	Scotland U19
Mark Gillespie	2018–2020	57	0	5	0	7	0	-	-	-	-	69	0	-
Liam Donnelly	2018–2022	53	8	6	1	12	4	-	-	-	-	71	13	Northern Ireland
Danny Johnson	2018–2019	22	6	1	0	5	2	-	-	-	-	28	8	-
Jake Carroll	2019–2023	62	2	5	0	7	0	2	0	-	-	76	2	Republic of Ireland U18
Declan Gallagher	2019–2021	59	3	5	0	5	0	3	0	-	-	72	3	Scotland
Mark O'Hara	2019–2020, 2020–2022	63	7	6	1	2	0	3	0	-	-	74	7	Scotland U21
Liam Polworth	2021–2022	51	1	3	1	5	1	3	1	-	-	62	4	-
Chris Long	2019–2021	54	11	5	4	4	1	3	1	-	-	66	17	England U20
Jermaine Hylton	2019–2020	33	2	3	0	5	2	-	-	-	-	41	4	-
Sherwin Seedorf	2019–2021	32	2	1	0	5	1	2	0	-	-	41	3	-
Devante Cole	2019–2020, 2020–2021	46	15	3	1	3	0	-	-	-	-	52	16	England U19
Nathan McGinley	2020–2024	45	0	5	0	5	0	2	0	-	-	57	0	-
Robbie Crawford	2020–2021, 2021–2022	22	0	3	0	4	0	-	-	-	-	29	3	-
Kaiyne Woolery	2021–2022	31	2	2	0	5	1	-	-	-	-	38	3	-
Kevin van Veen	2021–2023	70	34	5	3	6	3	2	0	-	-	83	40	-
Jordan Roberts	2021, 2021–2022, 2022	25	3	3	3	0	0	0	0	-	-	28	5	-
Sean Goss	2021–2023	67	2	4	0	2	0	1	0	-	-	74	2	-
Sondre Solholm Johansen	2021–2023	41	1	3	0	2	0	1	0	-	-	47	1	Norway U18
Connor Shields	2021–2023	44	2	4	1	3	0	2	0	-	-	53	3	-
Joseph Efford	2022–2023	23	3	2	1	1	0	2	0	-	-	28	4	-
Dean Cornelius	2018–2023	46	2	3	0	4	0	0	0	-	-	53	2	-
Ross Tierney	2022–2024	32	4	2	0	2	0	2	0	-	-	38	4	Republic of Ireland U21
Blair Spittal	2022–2024	73	15	4	2	7	2	2	0	-	-	86	19	-
Stuart McKinstry	2022–2023	21	4	2	0	2	0	-	-	-	-	25	4	Scotland U17
Dan Casey	2023–2025	76	6	2	0	10	1	-	-	-	-	85	7	Republic of Ireland U19
Harry Paton	2023–2025	54	2	2	0	7	0	0	0	-	-	63	2	Canada
Calum Butcher	2023–2024	30	0	3	0	0	0	0	0	-	-	33	0	-
Theo Bair	2023–2024	38	15	2	0	1	0	-	-	-	-	41	15	Canada
Shane Blaney	2023–2025	43	2	2	0	9	1	-	-	-	-	54	3	-
Lennon Miller	2022–2025	61	2	2	0	13	4	-	-	-	-	76	6	Scotland
Georgie Gent	2023–2024	29	1	2	1	0	0	-	-	-	-	31	2	-
Davor Zdravkovski	2023–2025	52	1	2	0	8	0	-	-	-	-	62	2	Macedonia U21
Andy Halliday	2024, 2024–2026	52	4	3	0	12	1	-	-	-	-	67	5	-
Moses Ebiye	2024–2025	33	5	1	0	6	2	-	-	-	-	40	7	-
Ewan Wilson	2023–Present	33	1	1	0	14	0	4	0	-	-	52	1	Scotland U21
Aston Oxborough	2022–2026	25	0	0	0	7	0	-	-	-	-	32	2	-
Liam Gordon	2024–2026	44	2	2	0	11	0	-	-	-	-	57	2	-
Marvin Kaleta	2024–2025	21	0	1	0	4	0	-	-	-	-	26	0	-
Tawanda Maswanhise	2024–Present	78	25	3	1	11	4	5	1	-	-	97	31	Zimbabwe
Tom Sparrow	2024–Present	73	6	3	0	10	0	4	0	-	-	90	6	Wales U21
Sam Nicholson	2024–2026	34	2	2	0	0	0	-	-	-	-	36	2	Scotland U21
Kofi Balmer	2024–2026	25	0	1	0	7	1	-	-	-	-	33	1	Northern Ireland
Apostolos Stamatelopoulos	2024–2026	35	11	1	0	9	1	0	0	-	-	45	12	Australia
John Koutroumbis	2024–Present	35	1	1	0	6	0	2	0	-	-	44	1	Australia U23
Lukas Fadinger	2025–Present	46	6	2	0	8	2	6	2	-	-	62	10	Austria U21
Elliot Watt	2025–2026	34	6	1	0	7	0	-	-	-	-	42	6	Scotland U21
Calum Ward	2025–2026	37	8	0	0	5	0	-	-	-	-	42	0	-
Ibrahim Said	2025–Present	50	5	2	0	6	0	5	2	-	-	63	7	Nigeria U17
Emmanuel Longelo	2025–Present	49	8	2	0	7	1	6	1	-	-	64	10	-
Elijah Just	2025–2026	35	7	2	0	6	0	-	-	-	-	43	7	New Zealand
Oscar Priestman	2025–Present	32	0	2	0	1	0	4	0	-	-	39	0	Australia U23
Stephen Welsh	2025–2026	27	1	0	0	2	0	-	-	-	-	29	1	Scotland U21
Regan Charles-Cook	2025–Present	33	1	1	0	3	1	6	2	-	-	43	4	Grenada

== Players with 1–24 appearances ==
As of match played 7 November 2026

Name	Years	League apps	League goals	Cup apps	Cup goals	League Cup apps	League Cup goals	Europe apps	Europe goals	Other apps (Note: Includes Relegation play-offs)	Other goals	Total apps	Total goals	International Career
Sandy Tait	1892–1894	17	0	4	0	-	-	-	-	-	-	21	1	-
Hughie Clifford	1892–1894	2	0			-	-	-	-	-	-	2+	0+	-
Archibald Buttery	1908–1912	21	0	1	0	-	-	-	-	-	-	22	1	-
Frank Wilson	1926–1928	10	1			-	-	-	-	-	-	10+	1+	-
Charlie Johnston	1932–1935	6	1			-	-	-	-	-	-	6+	1+	Scotland
Ian Muir	1950–1952	7	0			-	-	-	-	-	-	7+	0+	-
Wallace Rea	1956–1958	14	3					-	-	-	-	15	3	-
Gerry Baker	1956–1958	11	4					-	-	-	-	12	4	-
Morris Stevenson	1960–1962	12	3					-	-	-	-	16	7	-
John Moore	1963–1965	3	0					-	-	-	-	3+	0+	-
John McLaughlin	1965–1966	18	4					-	-	-	-	22	4	-
John Fallon	1971–1972	10	0					-	-	-	-	12	0	-
Billy Brown	1971–1972	9	1					-	-	-	-	19	1	-
Billy Dickson	1974–1975	12	0					-	-	-	-	20	0	Scotland
Mick McManus	1975–1977	3	0	0	0	0	0	-	-	-	-	3	0	-
Tommy O'Neill	1976–1977	12	1	0	0	0	0	-	-	-	-	12	1	-
Harry Hood	1976–1977	15	0					-	-	-	-	19	1	Scotland
Ian Purdie	1977–1978	16	3					-	-	-	-	22	4	Scotland U23
Jimmy Robertson	1977–1978	5	0	0	0	0	0	-	-	-	-	5	0	-
Dave Latchford	1978–1979	8	0					-	-	-	-	14	0	-
Peter Carr	1978–1979	7	0					-	-	-	-	8	0	-
Paul Wilson	1978–1979	21	1					-	-	-	-	22	1	Scotland
Paul Friar	1983–1984	2	0	0	0	0	0	-	-	-	-	2	0	-
Kenny Black	1983–1984	17	0					-	-	-	-	18	0	-
Kenny Lyall	1983–1984	19	2					-	-	-	-	21	2	-
Andy Ritchie	1983–1984	8	1					-	-	-	-	16	4	Scotland U21
Stephen McBride	1983–1984	4	0					-	-	-	-	5	0	-
Robert Clark	1984–1986	12	1					-	-	-	-	14	1	-
John McStay	1984–1987	21	1					-	-	-	-	24	1	-
Jim Dobbin	1984–1985	2	0	0	0	0	0	-	-	-	-	2	0	Scotland U18
Kevin McKeown	1986–1989	3	0	0	0	0	0	-	-	-	-	3	0	-
Stephen McBride	1983–1984	4	0					-	-	-	-	5	0	-
Jamie Fairlie	1987–1988	12	1					-	-	-	-	16	3	-
Mark Caughey	1987–1988	15	0	0	0	0	0	-	-	-	-	15	0	Northern Ireland
Jimmy Gardner	1988–1993	16	0					-	-	-	-	17	0	-
Mark Reilly	1988–1991	4	0	0	0	0	0	-	-	-	-	4	0	-
Robert Maaskant	1991–1992	12	0	0	0	0	0	-	-	-	-	12	0	-
Tony Shepherd	1991–1993	9	0	0	0	0	0	1	0	-	-	10	0	-
Alex Jones	1992	12	1					-	-	-	-	13	1	-
Alan Sneddon	1992–1993	16	0					-	-	-	-	19	1	Scotland U21
Paul Baker	1992–1993	9	1					-	-	-	-	10	1	-
Ally Graham	1993	9	1					-	-	-	-	10	2	-
Ray Allan	1994	0	0	0	0	1	0	1	0	-	-	2	0	-
Alex McLeish	1994–1995	3	0					1	0	-	-	5	0	Scotland
Roy Essandoh	1994–1997	5	0	0	0	0	0	1	0	-	-	6	0	-
Franz Resch	1997	3	0	0	0	2	0	-	-	-	-	5	0	Austria
Mario Dorner	1997	2	0	0	0	2	0	-	-	-	-	4	0	-
Gunnlaugur Jónsson	1997–1998	2	0	0	0	0	0	-	-	-	-	2	0	Iceland
Rob Newman	1997–1998	11	0	4	0	0	0	-	-	-	-	15	0	-
Éric Garcin	1997–1998	11	1	2	0	0	0	-	-	-	-	13	1	-
Scott Y. Thomson	1998	1	0	0	0	0	0	-	-	-	-	1	0	-
Mikko Kavén	1998–1999	16	0	0	0	1	0	-	-	-	-	17	0	Finland
Kai Nyyssönen	1998–1999	3	1	0	0	1	0	-	-	-	-	4	1	Finland
Tony Thomas	1998–2001	17	0	1	1	2	0	-	-	-	-	20	1	-
Rob Matthaei	1998–200	20	0	1	0	1	0	-	-	-	-	22	1	-
Jan Michels	1998–1999	10	0	0	0	1	0	-	-	-	-	11	0	-
Greg Miller	1998–1999	4	0	0	0	2	0	-	-	-	-	6	0	-
Stephen Halliday	1998–2000	9	0	0	0	5	2	-	-	-	-	14	2	-
Hervé Bacqué	1999	1	0	0	0	0	0	-	-	-	-	1	0	-
Mark Gower	1999	9	1	0	0	0	0	-	-	-	-	9	1	-
Brian Dempsie	1999–2003	2	0	0	0	0	0	-	-	-	-	2	0	-
Saša Ćurčić	2000	5	0	0	0	0	0	-	-	-	-	5	0	Yugoslavia
James Okoli	2000–2001	5	0	0	0	0	0	-	-	-	-	5	0	-
Jamie McClen	2000–2001	3	0	0	0	0	0	-	-	-	-	3	0	-
Ange Oueifio	2000–2002	17	0	1	0	2	0	-	-	-	-	20	0	Central African Republic
Mark Brown	2001–2002	19	0	0	0	1	0	-	-	-	-	20	0	-
Franck Bernhard	2001–2002	3	0	0	0	0	0	-	-	-	-	3	0	-
Éric Deloumeaux	2001–2002	23	0	1	0	0	0	-	-	-	-	24	0	-
Yann Soloy	2001–2002	12	1	1	0	0	0	-	-	-	-	13	1	-
Andy Dow	2001–2002	9	1	1	0	0	0	-	-	-	-	10	1	Scotland U21
Eddie Forrest	2001–2002	13	0	1	0	1	0	-	-	-	-	15	0	-
Stephen Cosgrove	2001–2002	2	0	0	0	1	0	-	-	-	-	3	0	-
Neil Tarrant	2001	5	0	0	0	1	0	-	-	-	-	6	0	Scotland U21
Saïd Chiba	2001	7	0	0	0	0	0	-	-	-	-	7	0	Morocco
Roberto Martínez	2001–2002	16	0	0	0	0	0	-	-	-	-	16	0	-
David Kelly	2001–2002	19	6	1	0	1	1	-	-	-	-	21	7	Republic of Ireland U23
David Cowan	2002–2004	17	0	3	0	2	0	-	-	-	-	22	0	-
Iain Russell	2002–2003	5	0	0	0	0	0	-	-	-	-	5	0	-
Daniel Sengewald	2002–2003	7	0	0	0	0	0	-	-	-	-	7	0	-
Steven Ferguson	2002–2003	19	2	0	0	2	0	-	-	-	-	21	2	-
Khaled Kemas	2002–2003	6	1	0	0	1	0	-	-	-	-	7	1	Algeria U23
Andy Scott	2002–2003	1	0	0	0	0	0	-	-	-	-	1	1	-
David Ferrère	2003	10	0	0	0	0	0	-	-	-	-	10	0	-
Tony Vaughan	2003	12	1	3	0	0	0	-	-	-	-	15	1	-
Richard Offiong	2003	9	0	1	0	0	0	-	-	-	-	10	0	England U20
Barry John Corr	2003–2005	11	0	0	0	0	0	-	-	-	-	11	0	-
Gary Bollan	2004	3	0	1	0	0	0	-	-	-	-	4	0	Scotland U21
Kenny Connolly	2004–2008	2	0	1	0	0	0	-	-	-	-	3	0	-
Adam Coakley	2004–2007	3	0	0	0	0	0	-	-	-	-	3	0	Scotland U18
Gerry Britton	2005	3	0	0	0	0	0	-	-	-	-	3	0	-
Andy Smith	2005	7	0	0	0	2	0	-	-	-	-	9	0	Northern Ireland
Bobby Donnelly	2005–2007	4	0	0	0	2	0	-	-	-	-	6	0	-
Steve McDonald	2005	1	0	0	0	0	0	-	-	-	-	1	0	-
Abel Thermeus	2005	1	0	0	0	1	0	-	-	-	-	2	0	-
Calum Elliot	2005	15	2	0	0	2	0	-	-	-	-	17	2	Scotland U21
Trevor Molloy	2006–2007	6	0	2	0	0	0	-	-	-	-	8	0	Republic of Ireland U21
Danny Murphy	2007–2008	15	1	3	0	0	0	-	-	-	-	18	1	Republic of Ireland U17
Paul Keegan	2007	8	0	2	0	0	0	-	-	-	-	10	0	-
Krisztián Vadócz	2007	11	0	0	0	0	0	-	-	-	-	11	0	Hungary
Simon Mensing	2007–2008	2	0	0	0	2	0	-	-	-	-	4	0	-
Lewis Grabban	2007–2008	5	0	0	0	1	0	-	-	-	-	6	0	-
Luke Daniels	2008	2	0	0	0	0	0	-	-	-	-	2	0	England U19
Gunnar Nielsen	2008, 2013–2015	19	0	1	0	2	0	1	0	-	-	23	0	Faroe Islands
Simon Lappin	2008	14	2	1	0	0	0	-	-	-	-	15	2	Scotland U21
Martin Grehan	2008	1	0	0	0	0	0	-	-	-	-	1	0	-
Bob Malcolm	2008–2009	21	2	0	0	1	0	2	0	-	-	24	2	Scotland U21
Maroš Klimpl	2008–2009	21	1	3	0	0	0	0	0	-	-	24	1	Slovakia
Artur Krysiak	2009	1	0	0	0	0	0	0	0	-	-	1	0	Poland U19
Cillian Sheridan	2009	13	2	2	0	0	0	0	0	-	-	15	2	Republic of Ireland U21
Michael Fraser	2009–2010	5	0	0	0	0	0	4	0	-	-	9	0	-
Yassin Moutaouakil	2009–2010	13	0	0	0	2	0	0	0	-	-	15	0	France U21
Paul Slane	2009–2010	3	0	0	0	0	0	6	1	-	-	9	1	Scotland U17
Steven Lawless	2009–2012, 2021	9	0	4	0	5	2	0	0	-	-	18	2	-
Gary Smith	2009–2012	2	0	0	0	1	0	1	0	-	-	4	0	-
Steven Meechan	2009–2011	4	0	0	0	0	0	-	-	-	-	4	0	-
Jamie Pollock	2009–2012	4	0	0	0	0	0	1	0	-	-	5	0	-
Michael McGlinchey	2010	8	0	0	0	0	0	0	0	-	-	8	0	New Zealand
Lee Hollis	2010–2014	18	0	1	0	1	0	1	0	-	-	21	0	-
Jordan Halsman	2010–2012	1	0	0	0	1	0	0	0	-	-	2	0	-
Esteban Casagolda	2010–2011	12	0	1	0	0	0	0	0	-	-	13	0	-
Nick Blackman	2010–2011	18	10	2	0	0	0	2	0	-	-	22	10	Barbados
Alan Gow	2010–2011	15	1	0	0	0	0	2	1	-	-	17	1	Scotland B
Gavin Gunning	2011	14	0	4	0	0	0	0	0	-	-	18	0	Republic of Ireland U21
Maurice Ross	2011	6	0	1	0	0	0	0	0	-	-	7	0	Scotland
Francis Jeffers	2011	10	1	4	1	0	0	0	0	-	-	14	2	England
Steve Jones	2011	12	1	4	1	1	0	0	0	-	-	17	2	Northern Ireland
Steven Hetherington	2011–2013	3	0	0	0	0	0	1	0	-	-	4	0	-
Ross Stewart	2012–2015	1	0	0	0	0	0	0	0	-	-	1	0	Scotland U19
Dale Shirkie	2012–2014	1	0	0	0	0	0	0	0	-	-	1	0	-
David Ferguson	2013–2017	16	0	0	0	0	0	0	0	-	-	16	0	-
Dylan Mackin	2013–2017	1	0	0	0	2	0	0	0	-	-	3	0	-
Kallum Higginbotham	2014–2015	10	1	0	0	0	0	-	-	-	-	10	1	-
Mark O'Brien	2014–2015	19	0	1	0	1	0	-	-	-	-	21	0	Republic of Ireland U19
Ross MacLean	2014–2019	16	0	1	0	3	1	0	0	0	0	20	1	-
George Long	2015	13	0	0	0	-	-	-	-	2	0	15	0	England U20
Anthony Straker	2015	12	0	0	0	0	0	-	-	1	0	14	0	Grenada
Ben Hall	2015–2016	18	1	1	0	0	0	-	-	-	-	19	1	Northern Ireland U19
Conor Grant	2015	11	1	1	0	0	0	0	0	-	-	12	1	England U18
Nathan Thomas	2015	2	0	0	0	0	0	0	0	-	-	2	0	-
Wes Fletcher	2015–2016	14	1	0	0	0	0	-	-	-	-	14	1	-
Theo Robinson	2015–2016	10	0	0	0	1	0	-	-	-	-	11	0	Jamaica
Jake Taylor	2015–2016	7	0	0	0	1	0	-	-	-	-	8	0	Wales
Morgaro Gomis	2016	10	0	1	0	0	0	-	-	-	-	11	0	Senegal
Lee Lucas	2016–2017	10	0	0	0	1	0	-	-	-	-	11	0	Wales U21
Jacob Blyth	2016–2017	8	0	0	0	1	0	-	-	-	-	9	0	-
Russell Griffiths	2017, 2017–2018	10	0	0	0	0	0	-	-	-	-	10	0	-
Zak Jules	2017	10	1	0	0	0	0	-	-	-	-	10	1	Scotland U21
Liam Brown	2017–2019	1	0	0	0	0	0	-	-	-	-	1	0	-
Shea Gordon	2017–2019	4	0	0	0	0	0	-	-	-	-	4	0	Northern Ireland U21
Rohan Ferguson	2017–2020	1	0	0	0	0	0	-	-	-	-	1	0	-
Adam Livingstone	2017–2020	5	0	0	0	0	0	-	-	-	-	5	0	-
Alex Rodríguez	2018–2019	20	0	1	0	3	0	-	-	-	-	24	0	-
David Devine	2018–2023	1	0	0	0	0	0	-	-	-	-	1	0	-
Christian Mbulu	2018–2019	6	0	0	0	0	0	-	-	-	-	6	0	-
Aaron Taylor-Sinclair	2018–2019	6	0	0	0	3	0	-	-	-	-	9	1	Antigua and Barbuda
Jamie Semple	2018–2021	3	0	0	0	3	0	-	-	-	-	6	0	Scotland U19
Gboly Ariyibi	2019	17	2	1	0	0	0	-	-	-	-	18	2	United States U23
Christian Ilić	2019–2020	8	0	0	0	5	1	-	-	-	-	13	1	-
Casper Sloth	2019–2020	0	0	0	0	1	0	-	-	-	-	1	0	Denmark
Christy Manzinga	2019–2020	6	1	1	0	0	0	-	-	-	-	7	1	DR Congo U20
Ross MacIver	2019–2021	8	1	1	0	0	0	0	0	-	-	9	1	-
Rolando Aarons	2020, 2022	8	0	2	1	1	0	0	0	-	-	11	1	Jamaica
Mikael Ndjoli	2020	1	0	1	0	0	0	0	0	-	-	2	1	-
Aaron Chapman	2020–2021	6	0	0	0	1	0	0	0	-	-	7	0	-
Jordan Archer	2020–2021	4	0	0	0	0	0	0	0	-	-	4	0	Scotland
Jordan White	2020–2021	18	0	0	0	1	0	1	0	-	-	20	1	-
Callum Lang	2020–2021	17	3	0	0	1	0	3	2	-	-	21	5	-
Harry Robinson	2020–2021	1	0	0	0	0	0	1	0	-	-	2	0	Northern Ireland U21
Tyler Magloire	2021	10	0	2	0	0	0	-	-	-	-	12	0	-
Sam Foley	2021	4	1	1	0	0	0	-	-	-	-	5	1	-
Harry Smith	2021	5	0	0	0	0	0	-	-	-	-	5	0	-
Max Johnston	2021–2023	19	3	2	0	0	0	-	-	-	-	21	3	Scotland U21
Juhani Ojala	2021–2022	21	1	2	0	1	0	-	-	-	-	24	1	Finland
Darragh O'Connor	2021–2022	1	0	0	0	4	0	-	-	-	-	5	0	-
Justin Amaluzor	2021–2022	10	0	1	0	2	1	-	-	-	-	13	1	-
Liam Shaw	2022	7	0	1	0	0	0	-	-	-	-	8	0	-
Victor Nirennold	2022	3	0	0	0	0	0	-	-	-	-	3	0	-
Josh Morris	2022–2023	9	0	0	0	1	0	2	0	-	-	12	0	England U20
Kian Speirs	2022–2023	1	0	0	0	0	0	0	0	-	-	1	0	-
Robbie Mahon	2022–2024	1	0	0	0	0	0	0	0	-	-	1	0	Republic of Ireland U17
Matt Penney	2022–2023	16	0	0	0	2	0	0	0	-	-	18	0	-
Luca Ross	2022–Present	13	1	1	0	5	0	3	0	-	-	22	1	-
Ollie Crankshaw	2023	4	0	2	0	0	0	0	0	-	-	6	0	-
Mikael Mandron	2023	10	1	1	2	0	0	0	0	-	-	11	3	-
Riku Danzaki	2023	3	0	1	0	0	0	0	0	-	-	4	0	-
Jack Aitchison	2023	10	0	1	0	0	0	0	0	-	-	11	0	Scotland U19
James Furlong	2023	16	0	0	0	0	0	0	0	-	-	16	0	Republic of Ireland U21
Jonathan Obika	2023, 2023–2024	19	2	2	0	3	2	0	0	-	-	24	4	England U20
Conor Wilkinson	2023–2024	14	3	0	0	5	1	-	-	-	-	19	4	Republic of Ireland U21
Mark Ferrie	2023–2025	5	0	0	0	7	0	-	-	-	-	12	0	-
Pape Souaré	2023–2024	3	0	3	0	0	0	-	-	-	-	6	0	Senegal
Mika Biereth	2023–2024	14	6	0	0	1	0	-	-	-	-	15	6	Denmark U21
Brodie Spencer	2023–2024	18	0	0	0	0	0	-	-	-	-	18	0	Northern Ireland
Oli Shaw	2023–2024	19	0	0	0	0	0	-	-	-	-	19	0	Scotland U21
Adam Montgomery	2024	0	0	1	0	0	0	-	-	-	-	1	0	-
Dylan Wells	2023–2026	2	0	1	0	3	0	-	-	-	-	6	1	-
Adam Devine	2024	10	1	1	0	0	0	-	-	-	-	11	1	Scotland U21
Jack Vale	2024, 2024–2025	19	2	2	1	0	0	-	-	-	-	21	3	Wales U21
Jili Buyabu	2024	0	0	1	0	0	0	-	-	-	-	1	0	-
Krisztián Hegyi	2024–2025	0	0	0	0	2	0	-	-	-	-	21	1	Hungary U21
Zach Robinson	2024–2026	12	1	0	0	7	1	-	-	-	-	19	2	-
Filip Stuparević	2024–2026	0	0	0	0	4	1	-	-	-	-	4	1	Serbia U21
Brannan McDermott	2024–2025	0	0	0	0	1	0	-	-	-	-	1	0	-
Steve Seddon	2024–2025	14	0	0	0	3	0	-	-	-	-	17	1	-
Ross Callachan	2024–2025	1	0	0	0	0	0	-	-	-	-	1	0	-
Jair Tavares	2024–2025	9	0	0	0	1	0	-	-	-	-	10	0	Portugal U19
Kai Andrews	2025	11	0	1	0	0	0	-	-	-	-	12	0	Wales U19
Archie Mair	2025	1	0	1	0	0	0	-	-	-	-	2	1	Scotland U21
Ellery Balcombe	2025	12	0	0	0	0	0	-	-	-	-	12	0	England U20
Dominic Thompson	2025	15	0	0	0	0	0	-	-	-	-	15	0	-
Luke Armstrong	2025	14	4	0	0	0	0	-	-	-	-	14	4	-
Luke Plange	2025	4	0	0	0	0	0	-	-	-	-	4	0	England U20
Will Dickson	2025	7	0	0	0	0	0	-	-	-	-	7	0	-
Eseosa Sule	2025–2026	0	0	0	0	3	0	-	-	-	-	3	0	-
Matthew Connelly	2019–Present	1	0	2	0	3	0	0	0	-	-	5	0	-
Esapa Osong	2025–2026	8	0	0	0	2	0	-	-	-	-	10	0	-
Zander McAllister	2024–Present	2	0	1	0	2	0	0	0	-	-	5	0	Scotland U19
Callum Hendry	2025–Present	23	0	0	0	1	1	0	0	-	-	24	1	-
Jordan McGhee	2025–Present	9	0	1	0	0	0	0	0	-	-	10	0	Scotland U21
Eythor Bjørgolfsson	2026–Present	19	1	1	0	0	0	0	0	-	-	20	1	-
Rocco McColm	2025–2026	1	0	0	0	0	0	-	-	-	-	1	0	-
Alex Paulsen	2026–Present	13	0	0	0	0	0	6	0	-	-	19	0	New Zealand
Jake Girdwood-Reich	2026–Present	12	0	0	0	1	0	6	0	-	-	19	0	Australia U23
Martin Moormann	2026–Present	13	0	0	0	1	0	5	1	-	-	19	1	Austria U21
Dylan Williams	2026–Present	4	0	0	0	0	0	3	1	-	-	7	1	-
Mikey Booth	2026–Present	1	0	0	0	1	0	4	0	-	-	6	0	-
Willy Vogt	2026–Present	6	0	0	0	1	0	6	0	-	-	13	0	Switzerland U18
Olly Whyte	2023–Present	1	0	0	0	1	0	6	0	-	-	8	0	-
Lucas Weir	2026–Present	0	0	0	0	0	0	1	0	-	-	1	0	-
Jamie Knight-Lebel	2026–Present	6	0	0	0	1	0	4	0	-	-	11	0	Canada
Alex Lowry	2026–Present	9	3	0	0	1	0	4	0	-	-	14	3	Scotland U21
Joe Hodge	2026–Present	11	0	0	0	1	0	2	0	-	-	14	0	Republic of Ireland
Seb Palmer-Houlden	2026–Present	11	2	0	0	0	0	2	0	-	-	12	2	-
Jardell Kanga	2026–Present	11	1	0	0	0	0	0	0	-	-	11	1	Sweden U21
Dylan Levitt	2026–Present	7	1	0	0	0	0	0	0	-	-	7	1	Wales

== International tournament representation ==
=== World Cup ===
The following were part of World Cup squads while playing for Motherwell.

Tournament	Players	Ref.
1994 FIFA World Cup	(Republic of Ireland) Tommy Coyne	
2010 FIFA World Cup	(New Zealand) Michael McGlinchey	
2026 FIFA World Cup	(New Zealand) Elijah Just	

=== CAF Africa Cup of Nations ===
The following were part of African Cup of Nations squads while playing for Motherwell.

Tournament	Players
1996 African Cup of Nations	(Sierra Leone) Ibrahim Kamara
1998 African Cup of Nations	(Namibia) Eliphas Shivute
2025 Africa Cup of Nations	(Zimbabwe) Tawanda Maswanhise

=== Copa América ===
The following were part of Copa América squads while playing for Motherwell.

Tournament	Players
2024 Copa América	(Canada) Theo Bair

=== UEFA European Championship ===
The following were part of European Championship squads while playing for Motherwell.

Tournament	Players
UEFA Euro 2020	(Scotland) Declan Gallagher, (Scotland) Stephen O'Donnell
UEFA Euro 2024	(Scotland) Liam Kelly

== Sources ==
- Jeffrey, Jim; Fry, Genge (2001). The Men Who Made Motherwell Football Club. Tempus Publishing. ISBN 978-0-7524-2191-9.
- List of Motherwell F.C. players at Post War English & Scottish Football League A–Z Player's Transfer Database
- Motherwellnet
- Scottish Football League Internationals | Players By Club | Motherwell, London Hearts Supporters Club. Retrieved 4 February 2022
- (Scotland U23) Players Capped When Playing With Motherwell, FitbaStats. Retrieved 4 February 2022
- (Scotland U21) Players Capped When Playing With Motherwell, FitbaStats. Retrieved 4 February 2022
- (Scotland B) Players Capped When Playing With Motherwell, FitbaStats. Retrieved 4 February 2022
- John Litster (October 2012). "A Record of pre-war Scottish League Players". Scottish Football Historian magazine.
