= John Johnman =

Scottish footballer (1900–1975)

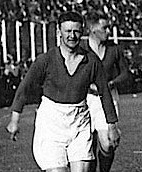
- Johnman in 1928 during Motherwell's South American tour

Personal information
- Birth name: John Johnman Ellarby
- Date of birth: 7 June 1900
- Place of birth: Morningside, Scotland
- Date of death: 1975 (aged 74–75)
- Place of death: Wishaw, Scotland
- Height: 5 ft 9 in (1.75 m)
- Positions: Right back; wing half

Senior career*
| Years | Team | Apps | (Gls) |
| – | Carluke Rovers | | |
| 1923–1932 | Motherwell | 249 | (1) |
| 1932–1933 | Stockport County | | |
| 1933–1934 | Halifax Town | | |
| 1934–1936 | Dunfermline Athletic | 67 | (0) |
| Total | | 316 | (1) |
- * Club domestic league appearances and goals

John Johnman (7 June 1900 – 1975) was a Scottish footballer who played mainly as a right back, although he was also used at wing half.

The majority of his career was spent with Motherwell, where he had a part in the team becoming established as one of the best in the country in the late 1920s, eventually took over from Dick Little in his preferred defensive position and featured in the 1931 Scottish Cup Final which the Steelmen lost to Celtic after a replay. He was still with the club when they won the Scottish Football League title in 1931–32, but made no appearances in that season for reasons unclear (Willie Dowall, previously considered a forward, was selected instead) and departed at its end.

Johnman then played in England for two years – one apiece with Stockport County and Halifax Town – before returning north with Dunfermline Athletic.

== See also ==
- List of Motherwell F.C. players
