= Robert McSkimming =

Robert McSkimming may refer to:

- Bobby McSkimming (born 1956), Scottish footballer for Queen's Park, Brisbane Lions
- Bob McSkimming (1864–1924), Scottish footballer for Stoke
- Robert McSkimming (footballer, born 1885) (1885–1952), Scottish footballer for Albion Rovers, Sheffield Wednesday, Motherwell
