= McSkimming =

McSkimming is a surname. Notable people with the surname include:

- Bob McSkimming (1864–1924) Scottish footballer
- Bobby McSkimming (born 1956), Scottish footballer
- David McSkimming, Australian accompanists and regular performer in concert and on radio
- Dent McSkimming (1896–1976), American sportswriter for several St. Louis newspapers
- Geoffrey McSkimming (born 1962), children's novelist and poet
- Peter McSkimming (1872–1941), Independent Member of Parliament for Clutha, in the South Island of New Zealand
- Robert McSkimming (footballer, born 1885) (1885–1952), Scottish footballer for Albion Rovers, Sheffield Wednesday, Motherwell
- Shaun McSkimming (born 1970), Scottish former footballer who played as a midfielder
- Warren McSkimming (born 1979), member of the Otago cricket team
