= Derek Murray =

Derek Murray may refer to:

- Derek Murray (Australian footballer) (born 1980), Australian rules football player
- Derek Murray (Gaelic footballer), Irish Gaelic football player
- Derek Murray (Scottish footballer) (born 1960), Scottish football player
- Derek Murray (sports presenter), Scottish television presenter

== See also ==
- Deryck Murray (born 1943), West Indian cricketer
