= Kian Speirs =

Scottish footballer

Personal information
- Full name: Kian Speirs
- Date of birth: 22 May 2004 (age 22)
- Place of birth: Motherwell, Scotland
- Height: 1.69 m (5 ft 6 1/2 in)
- Position: Midfielder

Team information
- Current team: Bonnyrigg Rose F.C.

Youth career
- Motherwell

Senior career*
Years	Team	Apps	(Gls)
2022–2023	Motherwell	1	(0)
2023	→ Stenhousemuir (loan)	10	(0)
2023–2025	Caledonian Braves		
2025-	Bonnyrigg Rose		
- * Club domestic league appearances and goals as of 15:02, 5 November 2023 (UTC)

Kian Speirs (born 22 May 2004) is a Scottish professional footballer who plays as a midfielder for Bonnyrigg Rose F.C..

== Club career ==
Speirs made his debut for Motherwell on the opening day of the 2022–23 season, coming off the bench to replace Sean Goss in a 1–0 victory over St Mirren 31 July 2022. On 21 January 2023, Speirs joined Stenhousemuir on loan for the rest of the season.

On 29 September 2023, Speirs signed for Lowland League club Caledonian Braves on a contract until the end of the season.

== Career statistics ==
As of match played 6 May 2023

Club	Season	League			Cup		League Cup		Other		Total	
Club	Season	Division	Apps	Goals	Apps	Goals	Apps	Goals	Apps	Goals	Apps	Goals
Motherwell	2022–23	Scottish Premiership	1	0	0	0	0	0	0	0	1	0
Motherwell	Total		1	0	0	0	0	0	0	0	1	0
Stenhousemuir (loan)	2022–23	Scottish League Two	10	0	1	0	0	0	0	0	11	0
Career total			11	0	1	0	0	0	0	0	12	0
