= 2022–23 Motherwell F.C. season =

Motherwell
2022–23 season
- Chairman: James McMahon
- Manager: Graham Alexander (Until 29 July); Steven Hammell (29 July-11 August (Caretaker)) (11 August-11 February (Permanent)); Stuart Kettlewell (11-22 February (Caretaker)) (from 22 February (Permanent))
- Stadium: Fir Park
- Premiership: 7th
- Scottish Cup: Fifth round vs Raith Rovers
- League Cup: Quarter-final vs Celtic
- UEFA Europa Conference League: Second qualifying round vs Sligo Rovers
- Top goalscorer: League: Kevin van Veen (25); All: Kevin van Veen (29)
- Highest home attendance: 8,610 vs Rangers (18 March 2023)
- Lowest home attendance: 3,982 vs Inverness Caledonian Thistle (31 August 2022)
- Average home league attendance: 5,985 (28 May 2023)
Home colours	Away colours	Third colours

The 2022–23 season was Motherwell's thirty-eighth consecutive season in the top flight of Scottish football, having been promoted from the Scottish First Division at the end of the 1984–85 season.

== Season review ==
=== Preseason ===
On 30 May, Motherwell confirmed a week-long training camp in Obertraun, Austria, between 3 and 10 July in the lead up to their 2022–23 UEFA Europa Conference League Second qualifying round matches.

==== Transfers ====
On 27 May 2022, Motherwell announced the signing of Blair Spittal to a two-year contract, from Ross County on a free transfer once his previous contract expired on 31 May 2022.

On 22 June 2022, Motherwell announced the signing of Paul McGinn to a one-year contract from Hibernian on a free transfer.

On 24 June, Motherwell announced that academy graduates, Josh Bogan, Robbie Garcia, Arran Bone, Brannan McDermott, Max Ross, Dylan Wells, Luca Ross, Shay Nevans and Mark Ferrie had all signed professional deals with the club.

On 11 July, Motherwell announced the signing of Josh Morris, on a free transfer from Salford City, to a two-year contract.

On 14 July, Motherwell announced that Kaiyne Woolery had left the club to join TFF First League club Sakaryaspor for an undisclosed fee.

On 26 July, Kevin van Veen signed a one-year extension to his contract, keeping him at Motherwell until the summer of 2024.

=== July ===
On 29 July, manager Graham Alexander and his assistant Chris Lucketti left the club by mutual consent, with Steven Hammell being placed in temporary charge.

=== August ===
On 11 August, Steven Hammell was confirmed as Motherwells new permanent Manager.

On 13 August, Motherwell announced the signing of Aston Oxborough to a two-year contract, after he'd left Norwich City at the end of the previous season.

On 17 August, Motherwell announced the return of Stuart McKinstry to the club, on a season-long loan deal from Leeds United.

On 25 August, Motherwell announced the signing of Matt Penney on loan from Ipswich Town for six-months.

On 30 August, Motherwell announced that return of Rolando Aarons on a season-long loan deal from Huddersfield Town.

=== September ===
On 1 September, Motherwell announced that Juhani Ojala had left the club by mutual consent, whilst David Devine, Logan Dunachie and Scott Fox all left the club on loan for the season, joining Alloa Athletic, East Kilbride and Queen of the South respectively.

On 2 September, Motherwell announced the season-long loan signing of Louis Moult from Burton Albion.

On 6 September, Max Johnston joined Cove Rangers on loan for the season.

On 9 September, Motherwell's away trip to Ross County, scheduled for 10 September, was postponed after the SPFL postponed all football fixtures from 9 – 11 September as a mark of respect following the death of Elizabeth II the previous day. On 16 September, it was confirmed that Motherwell's postponed fixture against Ross County would now be played at 19:45 on 4 October.

On 30 September, Ewan Wilson joined Albion Rovers on loan for the remainder of the season, whilst Robbie Mahon joined Dunfermline Athletic and Corey O’Donnell joined Bonnyrigg Rose Athletic on similar deals.

=== October ===
On 5 October, Daniel Hunter joined Cumbernauld Colts on loan for the remainder of the season.

=== November ===
On 2 November, Motherwell announced that Rolando Aarons' had been ended early due to the injury suffered against Heart of Midlothian.

On 24 November, Scott Fox returned from his loan spell at Queen of the South after it was ended by mutual agreement.

=== December ===
On 16 December, Motherwell's home against St Mirren, scheduled for 17 December, was postponed due to extensive stadium damage and flooding caused by recent cold weather.

On 19 December, Motherwell announced the signing of Shane Blaney from Sligo Rovers to a two-and-a-half-year contract, starting 1 January 2023.

On 22 December, Scott Fox left Motherwell by mutual agreement.

On 29 December, Motherwell's postponed Round 17 match against St Mirren was rearranged for 15 February.

=== January ===
On 1 January, Max Johnston was recalled from his loan spell with Cove Rangers.

On 5 January, Daniel Hunter's loan to Cumbernauld Colts was extended until the end of the season. The following day, 6 January, Louis Moult's loan deal was ended through injury and he returned to Burton Albion.

On 12 January, Motherwell announced the signing of Ollie Crankshaw on loan from Stockport County for the remainder of the season. The following day, 13 January, Motherwell announced the signing of Mikael Mandron on a contract until the end of the season.

On 18 January, Matt Penney returned to parent club Ipswich Town.

On 20 January, goalkeeper Matthew Connelly joined Stranraer on loan for the rest of the season.

On 21 January, Kian Speirs joined Stenhousemuir on loan for the rest of the season.

On 26 January, Barry Maguire joined Dundee on loan for the rest of the season.

On 28 January, Motherwell announced the signing of Riku Danzaki from Hokkaido Consadole Sapporo on a contract until the summer of 2025.

On 31 January, Sondre Johansen left the club to sign for Odd for an undisclosed fee, and Connor Shields joined Queen of the South on loan for the remainder of the season. Later on in the day Motherwell announced the loan signing of James Furlong from Brighton & Hove Albion for the remainder of the season, and the permanent signing of Jack Aitchison from Barnsley until the end of the season.

=== February ===
On 1 February, Motherwell announced the signing of Jonathan Obika on loan from Morecambe for the remainder of the season.

On 3 February, Motherwell announced the signing of Dan Casey who'd most recently played for Sacramento Republic. The following day, 4 February, Motherwell announced the signing of Calum Butcher on a contract until the summer of 2024 following his release from Burton Albion.

On 11 February, Steven Hammell left his role as Head Coach of Motherwell, with Stuart Kettlewell being placed in temporary charge. After two wins from two, Kettlewell was named as Motherwells new permanent Manager on 22 February.

On 28 February, Logan Dunachie joined Forfar Athletic on loan for the remainder of the season.

=== April ===
On 1 April, Motherwell announced the signing of Harry Paton on a contract until the end of the season.

=== May ===
On 31 May, Motherwell announced that Josh Morris had been released from his contract early, and that negotiations for new contracts where taking place with Jake Carroll, Logan Dunachie, Daniel Hunter, Kian Speirs, Jack Aitchison, Matthew Connelly, Max Johnston, Ewan Wilson, Dan Casey, Dean Cornelius, Sean Goss, Mikael Mandron, David Devine and Corey O’Donnell.

== Squad ==
As of match played 28 May 2023

No.	Name	Nationality	Position	Date of birth (age)	Signed from	Signed in	Contract ends	Apps.	Goals
Goalkeepers
1	Liam Kelly	(Scotland)	GK	23 January 1996 (aged 27)	Queens Park Rangers	2021	2024	111	0
13	Aston Oxborough	(England)	GK	9 May 1998 (aged 25)	Unattached	2022	2024	0	0
Defenders
2	Stephen O'Donnell	(Scotland)	DF	11 May 1992 (aged 31)	Kilmarnock	2020	2023	103	3
3	Jake Carroll	(Republic of Ireland)	DF	11 August 1991 (aged 31)	Cambridge United	2019	2023	76	2
4	Ricki Lamie	(Scotland)	DF	20 June 1993 (aged 29)	Livingston	2020	2024	99	5
5	Bevis Mugabi	(Uganda)	DF	1 May 1995 (aged 28)	Yeovil Town	2019	2024	87	5
16	Paul McGinn	(Scotland)	DF	22 October 1990 (aged 32)	Hibernian	2022	2023	42	0
19	Nathan McGinley	(England)	DF	15 September 1996 (aged 26)	Forest Green Rovers	2020	2024	54	0
20	Shane Blaney	(Republic of Ireland)	DF	20 January 1999 (aged 24)	Sligo Rovers	2022	2025	9	0
22	Max Johnston	(Scotland)	DF	24 December 2003 (aged 19)	Academy	2020		21	3
24	James Furlong	(Republic of Ireland)	DF	7 June 2002 (aged 20)	on loan from Brighton & Hove Albion	2023	2023	16	0
52	Dan Casey	(Republic of Ireland)	DF	29 October 1997 (aged 25)	Unattached	2023		13	0
Midfielders
7	Blair Spittal	(Scotland)	MF	19 December 1995 (aged 27)	Ross County	2022	2024	42	6
8	Callum Slattery	(England)	MF	8 February 1999 (aged 24)	Southampton	2021	2024	69	6
17	Stuart McKinstry	(Scotland)	MF	18 September 2002 (aged 20)	on loan from Leeds United	2022	2023	25	4
18	Dean Cornelius	(Scotland)	MF	11 April 2001 (aged 22)	Hibernian	2018	2023	53	2
23	Josh Morris	(England)	MF	30 September 1991 (aged 31)	Salford City	2022	2024	12	0
26	Ross Tierney	(Republic of Ireland)	MF	6 March 2001 (aged 22)	Bohemians	2022	2025	38	4
27	Sean Goss	(Germany)	MF	1 October 1995 (aged 27)	Unattached	2021	2023	74	2
53	Harry Paton	(Canada)	MF	23 May 1998 (aged 25)	Unattached	2023	2023	7	0
66	Calum Butcher	(England)	MF	26 February 1991 (aged 32)	Unattached	2023	2024	14	0
Forwards
9	Kevin van Veen	(Netherlands)	FW	1 June 1991 (aged 31)	Scunthorpe United	2021	2024	83	40
11	Joseph Efford	(United States)	FW	29 August 1996 (aged 26)	Waasland-Beveren	2022	2023	28	4
12	Ollie Crankshaw	(England)	FW	12 August 1998 (aged 24)	on loan from Stockport County	2023	2023	6	0
14	Riku Danzaki	(Japan)	FW	31 May 2000 (aged 22)	Hokkaido Consadole Sapporo	2023	2025	4	0
15	Jack Aitchison	(Scotland)	FW	5 March 2000 (aged 23)	Barnsley	2023	2023	11	0
21	Mikael Mandron	(France)	FW	11 October 1994 (aged 28)	Unattached	2023	2023	11	3
99	Jonathan Obika	(England)	FW	12 September 1990 (aged 32)	on loan from Morecambe	2023	2023	10	1
Youth team
35	Sam Campbell	(Scotland)	DF	13 April 2004 (aged 19)	Academy	2021		0	0
37	Muhammad Adam	(Nigeria)	FW	27 February 2005 (aged 18)	Academy	2021		0	0
38	Lennon Miller	(Scotland)	MF	25 August 2006 (aged 16)	Academy	2022		5	0
39	Adam MacDonald	(Scotland)	MF	26 July 2005 (aged 17)	Academy	2021		0	0
40	Richard Tambwe	(Scotland)	FW	24 April 2005 (aged 18)	Academy	2021		0	0
41	Josh Bogan	(Scotland)	GK		Academy	2022		0	0
42	Brannan McDermott	(Scotland)	DF		Academy	2022		0	0
43	Robbie Garcia	(Scotland)	DF		Academy	2022		0	0
44	Ali Gould	(Scotland)	DF	26 July 2005 (aged 17)	Academy	2021		0	0
45	Arran Bone	(Scotland)	DF		Academy	2022		0	0
46	Max Ross	(Scotland)	DF		Academy	2022		0	0
47	Luca Ross	(Scotland)	FW	11 August 2006 (aged 16)	Academy	2022		1	0
48	Dylan Wells	(Scotland)	MF	20 March 2006 (aged 17)	Academy	2022		0	0
49	Mark Ferrie	(Scotland)	FW	2 December 2005 (aged 17)	Academy	2022		0	0
50	Shay Nevans	(Scotland)	MF		Academy	2022		0	0
Away on loan
6	Barry Maguire	(Scotland)	MF	27 April 1998 (aged 25)	Academy	2015	2024	75	2
25	David Devine	(Scotland)	DF	20 June 2001 (aged 21)	Academy	2019	2023	1	0
28	Robbie Mahon	(Republic of Ireland)	FW	6 June 2003 (aged 19)	Bohemians	2022	2023	1	0
29	Connor Shields	(Scotland)	FW	29 July 1997 (aged 25)	Queen of the South	2021	2024	53	3
30	Corey O’Donnell	(Scotland)	FW	28 October 2003 (aged 19)	Academy	2021		0	0
31	Matthew Connelly	(Scotland)	GK	2 March 2003 (aged 20)	Academy	2019		0	0
32	Daniel Hunter	(Scotland)	MF	25 January 2004 (aged 19)	Academy	2021		0	0
33	Ewan Wilson	(Scotland)	DF	19 November 2004 (aged 18)	Academy	2021		0	0
34	Logan Dunachie	(Scotland)	DF	3 February 2004 (aged 19)	Academy	2021		0	0
36	Kian Speirs	(Scotland)	MF	22 May 2004 (aged 19)	Academy	2021		1	0
Left during the season
12	Scott Fox	(Scotland)	GK	28 June 1987 (aged 35)	Partick Thistle	2020	2023	0	0
14	Juhani Ojala	(Finland)	DF	19 June 1989 (aged 33)	Vejle	2021	2023	24	1
15	Sondre Johansen	(Norway)	DF	7 July 1995 (aged 27)	Mjøndalen	2021	2024	47	1
20	Rolando Aarons	(Jamaica)	MF	16 November 1995 (aged 27)	on loan from Huddersfield Town	2022	2023	11	1
21	Louis Moult	(England)	FW	14 May 1992 (aged 31)	on loan from Burton Albion	2022	2023	105	51
24	Matt Penney	(England)	DF	11 February 1998 (aged 25)	on loan from Ipswich Town	2022	2023	18	0

== Transfers ==
=== In ===
Date	Position	Nationality	Name	From	Fee	Ref
27 May 2022†	MF	(Scotland)	Blair Spittal	Ross County	Free	
22 June 2022	DF	(Scotland)	Paul McGinn	Hibernian	Free	
11 July 2022	MF	(England)	Josh Morris	Salford City	Free	
13 August 2022	GK	(England)	Aston Oxborough	Unattached	Free	
1 January 2023	DF	(Republic of Ireland)	Shane Blaney	Sligo Rovers	Undisclosed	
13 January 2023	FW	(France)	Mikael Mandron	Unattached	Free	
28 January 2023	FW	(Japan)	Riku Danzaki	Hokkaido Consadole Sapporo	Undisclosed	
31 January 2023	FW	(Scotland)	Jack Aitchison	Barnsley	Free	
3 February 2023	DF	(Republic of Ireland)	Dan Casey	Unattached	Free	
4 February 2023	MF	(England)	Calum Butcher	Unattached	Free	
1 April 2023	MF	(Canada)	Harry Paton	Unattached	Free	

† Transfers were announced on the above date, but didn't come into effect until 1 June 2022 once their previous contracts expired on 31 May 2022.

=== Loans in ===
Date from	Position	Nationality	Name	From	Date to	Ref.
17 August 2022	MF	(Scotland)	Stuart McKinstry	Leeds United	End of season	
25 August 2022	DF	(England)	Matt Penney	Ipswich Town	18 January 2023	
30 August 2022	MF	(Jamaica)	Rolando Aarons	Huddersfield Town	2 November 2022	
2 September 2022	FW	(England)	Louis Moult	Burton Albion	6 January 2023	
12 January 2023	FW	(England)	Ollie Crankshaw	Stockport County	End of season	
31 January 2023	DF	(Republic of Ireland)	James Furlong	Brighton & Hove Albion	End of season	
1 February 2023	FW	(England)	Jonathan Obika	Morecambe	End of season	

=== Out ===
Date	Position	Nationality	Name	To	Fee	Ref.
30 June 2022	MF	(Scotland)	Bailey Rice	Rangers	Undisclosed	
14 July 2022	FW	(England)	Kaiyne Woolery	Sakaryaspor	Undisclosed	
31 January 2023	DF	(Norway)	Sondre Johansen	Odd	Undisclosed	

=== Loans out ===
Date from	Position	Nationality	Name	To	Date to	Ref.
1 September 2022	DF	(Scotland)	David Devine	Alloa Athletic	End of season	
1 September 2022	DF	(Scotland)	Logan Dunachie	East Kilbride	6 January 2023	
1 September 2022	GK	(Scotland)	Scott Fox	Queen of the South	24 November 2022	
6 September 2022	DF	(Scotland)	Max Johnston	Cove Rangers	1 January 2023	
30 September 2022	DF	(Scotland)	Ewan Wilson	Albion Rovers	End of season	
30 September 2022	FW	(Republic of Ireland)	Robbie Mahon	Dunfermline Athletic	End of season	
30 September 2022	FW	(Scotland)	Corey O’Donnell	Bonnyrigg Rose Athletic	End of season	
5 October 2022	MF	(Scotland)	Daniel Hunter	Cumbernauld Colts	End of season	
20 January 2023	GK	(Scotland)	Matthew Connelly	Stranraer	End of season	
21 January 2023	MF	(Scotland)	Kian Speirs	Stenhousemuir	End of season	
26 January 2023	MF	(Scotland)	Barry Maguire	Dundee	End of season	
31 January 2023	FW	(Scotland)	Connor Shields	Queen of the South	End of season	
28 February 2023	DF	(Scotland)	Logan Dunachie	Forfar Athletic	End of season	

=== Released ===
Date	Position	Nationality	Name	Joined	Date	Ref.
1 September 2022	DF	(Finland)	Juhani Ojala	Doxa Katokopias	11 January 2023	
22 December 2022	GK	(Scotland)	Scott Fox	Cove Rangers	17 January 2023	
31 May 2023	GK	(Scotland)	Matthew Connelly	New Contract	21 June 2023	
31 May 2023	DF	(Republic of Ireland)	Jake Carroll	Bohemians	16 May 2024	
31 May 2023	DF	(Republic of Ireland)	Dan Casey	New Contract	14 July 2023	
31 May 2023	DF	(Scotland)	David Devine	Alloa Athletic	15 June 2023	
31 May 2023	DF	(Scotland)	Logan Dunachie	Clyde	9 June 2023	
31 May 2023	DF	(Scotland)	Max Johnston	Sturm Graz	25 July 2023	
31 May 2023	DF	(Scotland)	Ewan Wilson	New Contract	21 June 2023	
31 May 2023	MF	(England)	Josh Morris			
31 May 2023	MF	(Germany)	Sean Goss	Asteras Tripolis	22 September 2023	
31 May 2023	MF	(Scotland)	Dean Cornelius	Harrogate Town	22 June 2023	
31 May 2023	MF	(Scotland)	Daniel Hunter	Broomhill		
31 May 2023	MF	(Scotland)	Kian Speirs	Caledonian Braves	29 September 2023	
31 May 2023	FW	(France)	Mikael Mandron	St Mirren	7 July 2023	
31 May 2023	FW	(Scotland)	Jack Aitchison	Exeter City	28 June 2023	
31 May 2023	FW	(Scotland)	Corey O’Donnell	Broomhill		

== Friendlies ==
8 July 2022	Vorwärts Steyr (Austria)	1–5	(Scotland) Motherwell	Obertraun, Austria
15:30 BST (UTC+1)	Mehicevic 48'	Report	6'; 23'; 30'; 49'; 67'	Stadium: BSFZ Obertraun; Attendance: 50

16 July 2022	Partick Thistle (Scotland)	0–1	(Scotland) Motherwell	Glasgow
15:00 BST (UTC+1)		Report	Efford 58'	Stadium: Firhill Stadium

8 December 2022	Tottenham Hotspur (England)	4–0	(Scotland) Motherwell	Enfield
13:00 GMT (UTC)	Kulusevski 3'; Doherty 28', 71'; Gil 40'	Report		Stadium: Tottenham Hotspur Training Ground

24 March 2023	Motherwell (Scotland)	0–0	(Republic of Ireland) St Patrick's Athletic	Motherwell, Scotland
GMT (UTC)				Stadium: Fir Park

== Competitions ==
=== Overview ===
Competition	First match	Last match	Starting round	Final position	Record							
Competition	First match	Last match	Starting round	Final position	Pld	W	D	L	GF	GA	GD	Win %
Premiership	31 July 2022	28 May 2022	Matchday 1	7th	38	14	8	16	53	51	+2	36.84
Scottish Cup	21 January 2023	11 February 2023	Fourth round	Fifth Round	2	1	0	1	3	3	+0	50.00
League Cup	31 August 2022	19 October 2022	Second round	Quarterfinal	2	1	0	1	4	4	+0	50.00
UEFA Europa Conference League	21 July 2022	28 July 2022	Second qualifying round	Second qualifying round	2	0	0	2	0	3	−3	0.00
Total					44	16	8	20	60	61	−1	36.36

Last updated: 28 May 2023
Source: Soccerway

=== Premiership ===
==== League table ====
Pos	Team	Pld	W	D	L	GF	GA	GD	Pts	Qualification or relegation (Note: Teams play each other three times (33 matches), before the league is split into two groups (the top six and the bottom six).)
5	Hibernian	38	15	7	16	57	59	−2	52	Qualification for the Europa Conference League second qualifying round
6	St Mirren	38	12	10	16	43	61	−18	46	
7	Motherwell	38	14	8	16	53	51	+2	50	
8	Livingston	38	13	7	18	36	60	−24	46	
9	St Johnstone	38	12	7	19	41	59	−18	43	

Rules for classification: 1) Points; 2) Goal difference; 3) Goals scored; 4) Head-to-Head points; 5) Head-to-Head goal difference; 6) Play-off (only if deciding champion, UEFA competitions qualification, second stage group allocation or relegation).

==== Results summary ====
Overall								Home						Away					
Pld	W	D	L	GF	GA	GD	Pts	W	D	L	GF	GA	GD	W	D	L	GF	GA	GD
38	14	8	16	53	51	+2	50	7	3	9	26	28	−2	7	5	7	27	23	+4

Last updated: 28 May 2023.
Source: SPFL

==== Results ====
31 July 2022 1	St Mirren	0–1	Motherwell	Paisley
15:00 BST (UTC+1)	Strain (yellow card) 6'; Tanser (yellow card) 42'; Baccus (yellow card) 47'; Ayunga (yellow card) 84'	Report	van Veen 42'; S.O'Donnell (yellow card) 45+1'; Goss (yellow card) 64'; Speirs (yellow card) 73'; Lamie (red card) 82'; Maguire (yellow card) 83'	Stadium: St Mirren Park; Attendance: 5,668; Referee: John Beaton

6 August 2022 2	Motherwell	1–2	St Johnstone	Motherwell
15:00 BST (UTC+1)	McGinn (yellow card) 87'; Carey 90+1' (o.g.)	Report	Hallberg (yellow card) 12'; Murphy 28'; Considine (yellow card) 45'; May 90+4' (yellow card) 90+5'	Stadium: Fir Park; Attendance: 4,711; Referee: Willie Collum

13 August 2022 3	Aberdeen	2–3	Motherwell	Aberdeen
15:00 BST (UTC+1)	Miovski 42'; Hayes 47'; MacKenzie (yellow card) 90+6'	Report	Spittal 20'; Slattery (yellow card) 35' (goal) 52' van Veen 55'; Morris (yellow card) 85'	Stadium: Pittodrie Stadium; Attendance: 14,714; Referee: Chris Graham

20 August 2022 4	Motherwell	1–0	Livingston	Motherwell
15:00 BST (UTC+1)	Morris (yellow card) 61' van Veen 68' (pen.)	Report	Bahamboula (yellow card) 74' (yellow-red card) 77'	Stadium: Fir Park; Attendance: 5,158; Referee: Nick Walsh

27 August 2022 5	Kilmarnock	2–1	Motherwell	Kilmarnock
15:00 BST (UTC+1)	Armstrong 71' (yellow card) 83'; Taylor 76'; Power (yellow card) 90+4'	Report	van Veen 14'; O'Donnell (yellow card) 19'	Stadium: Rugby Park; Attendance: 6,238; Referee: Euan Anderson

3 September 2022 6	Motherwell	0–0	Dundee United	Motherwell
15:00 BST (UTC+1)	van Veen (penalty missed) 34'; Slattery (yellow card) 55'; McGinn (yellow card) 69'	Report	McGrath (yellow card) 2'	Stadium: Fir Park; Attendance: 5,783; Referee: Craig Napier

18 September 2022 8	Motherwell	0–3	Heart of Midlothian	Motherwell
15:00 BST (UTC+1)	Aarons (yellow card) 37'; McKinstry (yellow card) 75'; McGinn (yellow card) 90+4'	Report	Shankland 17'; Forrest 50', 90' (yellow card) 79'; Smith (yellow card) 90+3'	Stadium: Fir Park; Attendance: 6,546; Referee: Nick Walsh

1 October 2022 9	Celtic	2–1	Motherwell	Glasgow
15:00 BST (UTC+1)	Furuhashi 16'; Welsh (yellow card) 52'; Hatate 64'; McGregor (red card) 89'	Report	Lamie (yellow card) 27'; Juranović 36' (o.g.) van Veen (yellow card) 42'; Penney (yellow card) 60'; Shields (yellow card) 90+4'	Stadium: Celtic Park; Attendance: 58,407; Referee: John Beaton

4 October 2022 7	Ross County	0–5	Motherwell	Dingwall
19:45 BST (UTC+1)	White (yellow card) 13'; Callachan (yellow card) 25'; Hiwula (yellow card) 62'	Report	van Veen 26' (pen.), 51', 89'; Kelly (yellow card) 28'; McGinn (yellow card) 32'; Slattery 49'; Efford 59'	Stadium: Victoria Park; Attendance: 2,568; Referee: Chris Graham
Note: Match originally scheduled for 10 September, but postponed on 9 September as a mark of respect following the death of Elizabeth II and rescheduled for 4 October.

8 October 2022 10	Hibernian	1–0	Motherwell	Edinburgh
15:00 BST (UTC+1)	Hanlon (yellow card) 39'; Porteous 67'; McKirdy (yellow card) 85'	Report	Slattery (yellow card) 44'; Shields (red card) 56'; Efford (yellow card) 74'; Lamie (yellow card) 79'; Penney (yellow card) 89'	Stadium: Easter Road; Attendance: 16,435; Referee: Grant Irvine

16 October 2022 11	Motherwell	1–2	Rangers	Motherwell
12:00 BST (UTC+1)	Goss (yellow card) 45' van Veen (yellow card) 55'; McKinstry 77'; Cornelius (yellow card) 90'	Report	Arfield (yellow card) 33'; Tillman 53'; Lundstram 69'; Wright (yellow card) 74'; Tavernier (yellow card) 75'; King (yellow card) 87'	Stadium: Fir Park; Attendance: 8,498; Referee: David Dickinson

22 October 2022 12	Motherwell	1–2	Aberdeen	Motherwell
15:00 BST (UTC+1)	Lamie (yellow card) 43'; Spittal (yellow card) 53'; McKinstry 55'; Goss (yellow card) 90+1'	Report	Miovski 4' (yellow card) 52'; Duk (yellow card) 33' (goal) 68'	Stadium: Fir Park; Attendance: 5,486; Referee: Euan Anderson

29 October 2022 13	Dundee United	0–1	Motherwell	Dundee
15:00 BST (UTC+1)	Watt (red card) 40'	Report	Johansen 22'; Slattery (yellow card) 66'	Stadium: Tannadice Park; Attendance: 7,581; Referee: John Beaton

6 November 2022 14	Heart of Midlothian	3–2	Motherwell	Edinburgh
15:00 GMT (UTC±0)	Grant (red card) 38'; Gordon (yellow card) 38'; Halliday 45', 47'; Sibbick (yellow card) 73'; Shankland 89' (pen.)	Report	Lamie (yellow card) 36'; Moult 61' (pen.) (yellow card) 61'; Spittal (yellow card) 79'; McKinstry (yellow card) 84'	Stadium: Tynecastle Park; Attendance: 18,806; Referee: Kevin Clancy

9 November 2022 15	Motherwell	1–2	Celtic	Motherwell
19:45 GMT (UTC±0)	Moult (yellow card) 64'; Morris (yellow card) 81'; Tierney 86'	Report	Furuhashi 15' (yellow card) 66'; Maeda 84'	Stadium: Fir Park; Attendance: 8,315; Referee: Willie Collum

12 November 2022 16	St Johnstone	1–1	Motherwell	Perth
15:00 GMT (UTC±0)	Wright 26'; Montgomery (yellow card) 53'; Hallberg (yellow card) 80'	Report	McKinstry (yellow card) 28'; Penney (yellow card) 38' van Veen (yellow card) 43'; Spittal 45+1'; O'Donnell (yellow card) 55'	Stadium: McDiarmid Park; Attendance: 4,055; Referee: Nick Walsh

23 December 2022 18	Motherwell	2–2	Kilmarnock	Motherwell
19:45 GMT (UTC±0)	van Veen 22'; Penney (yellow card) 59'; Slattery 60' (yellow card) 74'	Report	Power (red card) 68'; McGinn 73' (o.g.); Polworth 75'	Stadium: Fir Park; Attendance: 4,861; Referee: John Beaton

28 December 2022 19	Rangers	3–0	Motherwell	Glasgow
19:45 GMT (UTC±0)	Tillman (yellow card) 11' (goal) 63'; Morelos 13'; Goldson 39'; Lundstram (yellow card) 51'	Report	Lamie (yellow card) 25'; Slattery (yellow card) 65'; Penney (yellow card) 89'	Stadium: Ibrox Stadium; Attendance: 49,605; Referee: David Dickinson

2 January 2023 20	Livingston	1–1	Motherwell	Livingston
15:00 GMT (UTC±0)	Montaño (yellow card) 10'; Devlin (penalty missed) 18'; Boyes 39'; S.Kelly (yellow card) 44'; Oméonga (yellow card) 70'	Report	van Veen 42'; Slattery (yellow card) 73'; Goss (yellow card) 79'	Stadium: Almondvale Stadium; Attendance: 2,163; Referee: David Munro

8 January 2023 21	Motherwell	2–3	Hibernian	Motherwell
13:30 GMT (UTC±0)	Slattery (yellow card) 57'; McKinstry 59'; Johansen (yellow card) 85'; Tierney 90+1'	Report	Nisbet 16', 52', 74'; Newell (yellow card) 90'	Stadium: Fir Park; Attendance: 5,594; Referee: David Munro

14 January 2023 22	Motherwell	1–1	Ross County	Motherwell
15:00 GMT (UTC±0)	Goss (yellow card) 20'; Crankshaw (yellow card) 37'; McKinstry 68'	Report	Callachan (yellow card) 20'; Tillson (yellow card) 43'; Dhanda (yellow card) 49'; Hiwula 80'	Stadium: Fir Park; Attendance: 4,574; Referee: David Dickinson

28 January 2023 23	St Mirren	1–0	Motherwell	Paisley
15:00 GMT (UTC±0)	Main 16'; Greive (yellow card) 37'; Offord (yellow card) 81'; Fraser (yellow card) 84'	Report	Goss (yellow card) 61'; Lamie (yellow card) 89'	Stadium: St Mirren Park; Attendance: 6,424; Referee: John Beaton

1 February 2023 24	Motherwell	0–2	St Johnstone	Motherwell
19:45 GMT (UTC±0)	Slattery (yellow card) 32'; Goss (yellow card) 61'	Report	Wright 5'; Hallberg 49'; May (yellow card) 56'	Stadium: Fir Park; Attendance: 4,131; Referee: Don Robertson

4 February 2023 25	Aberdeen	3–1	Motherwell	Aberdeen
15:00 GMT (UTC±0)	Duk 42'; Miovski 64', 69' (yellow card) 64'; Kennedy (yellow card) 74'; Pollock (yellow card) 74'; Clarkson (yellow card) 77'	Report	Goss (yellow card) 39'; Obika (yellow card) 45+4'; O'Donnell (yellow card) 50' van Veen 75'	Stadium: Pittodrie Stadium; Attendance: 14,271; Referee: Kevin Clancy

15 February 2023 17	Motherwell	2–1	St Mirren	Motherwell
19:45 GMT (UTC±0)	van Veen 8'; Johnston 19'; Obika (yellow card) 35'; Butcher (yellow card) 69'	Report	Strain 24'; Kiltie (yellow card) 62'; Baccus (yellow card) 86'; Gallagher (yellow card) 90'; Small (yellow card) 90+1'	Stadium: Fir Park; Attendance: 4,978; Referee: John Beaton
Note: Match originally scheduled for 17 December, but postponed on 16 December due to stadium damage and flooding.

19 February 2023 26	Motherwell	2–0	Heart of Midlothian	Motherwell
12:00 GMT (UTC±0)	Obika 40'; Spittal 46'; Furlong (yellow card) 71'	Report	Atkinson (yellow card) 85'	Stadium: Fir Park; Attendance: 6,450; Referee: Don Robertson

25 February 2023 27	Kilmarnock	1–1	Motherwell	Kilmarnock
15:00 GMT (UTC±0)	Robinson 17'; Doidge (yellow card) 35'; Polworth (yellow card) 65'; McKenzie (yellow card) 89'	Report	Casey (yellow card) 65' van Veen (yellow card) 72'; Slattery 90' (yellow card) 90+1'	Stadium: Rugby Park; Attendance: 6,512; Referee: Alan Muir

4 March 2023 28	Ross County	0–2	Motherwell	Dingwall
GMT (UTC±0)	Baldwin (red card) 70'	Report	Obika (yellow card) 25' van Veen 74', 88'; Casey (yellow card) 80'	Stadium: Victoria Park; Attendance: 4,091; Referee: Don Robertson

18 March 2023 29	Motherwell	2–4	Rangers	Motherwell
12:30 GMT (UTC±0)	van Veen 3'; Casey (yellow card) 20'; Slattery (yellow card) 22' (yellow-red card) 76'; Mugabi 76'	Report	Tavernier 23'; Jack (yellow card) 45'; Sakala 46'; Cantwell 63'; Tillman 69'	Stadium: Fir Park; Attendance: 8,610; Referee: Nick Walsh

1 April 2023 30	Hibernian	1–3	Motherwell	Edinburgh
15:00 BST (UTC+1)	Doyle-Hayes (yellow card) 6'; Marshall (yellow card) 52'; Nisbet 62'; Jeggo (yellow card) 80'	Report	Goss 7' van Veen 54' (pen.), 82'; Furlong (yellow card) 84'	Stadium: Easter Road; Attendance: 16,598; Referee: Graham Grainger

8 April 2023 31	Motherwell	3–0	Livingston	Motherwell
15:00 BST (UTC+1)	van Veen 9', 33'; Johnston 34'; O'Donnell (yellow card) 90+2'	Report	Guthrie (yellow card) 37'	Stadium: Fir Park; Attendance: 4,566; Referee: Grant Irvine

15 April 2023 32	Motherwell	1–2	Dundee United	Motherwell
15:00 BST (UTC+1)	van Veen 22'; Butcher (yellow card) 45+1'; Kelly (yellow card) 69'; Casey (yellow card) 84'	Report	Niskanen (yellow card) 28' (goal) 63'; McGrath 71' (pen.); Ayina (yellow card) 88'; Fletcher (yellow card) 90+7'; Birighitti (yellow card) 90+8'	Stadium: Fir Park; Attendance: 6,391; Referee: Nick Walsh

22 April 2023 33	Celtic	1–1	Motherwell	Glasgow
15:00 BST (UTC+1)	McGregor 24'; Furuhashi (yellow card) 64'	Report	van Veen 55' (yellow card) 90+4'; Paton (yellow card) 74'; Slattery (yellow card) 81'	Stadium: Celtic Park; Attendance: 58,145; Referee: John Beaton

6 May 2023 34	Motherwell	2–0	Kilmarnock	Motherwell
15:00 BST (UTC+1)	Spittal 4'; Goss (yellow card) 29'; Slattery (yellow card) 58' van Veen 90+1'	Report	Wright (yellow card) 41'; Doidge (yellow card) 44'	Stadium: Fir Park; Attendance: 6,168; Referee: Kevin Clancy

13 May 2023 35	St Johnstone	0–2	Motherwell	Perth
BST (UTC+1)		Report	Furlong (yellow card) 36' van Veen 52' (pen.); Mandron 90+3'	Stadium: McDiarmid Park; Referee: Grant Irvine

20 May 2023 36	Motherwell	1–0	Ross County	Motherwell
15:00 BST (UTC+1)	Casey (yellow card) 57'; Aitchison (yellow card) 79'; Spittal (yellow card) 84' van Veen 90+9' (pen.)	Report	Edwards (yellow card) 85' (yellow-red card) 90+1'	Stadium: Fir Park; Attendance: 5,289; Referee: Euan Anderson

24 May 2023 37	Livingston	1–1	Motherwell	Livingston
19:45 BST (UTC+1)	George (red card) 43'; Montaño (yellow card) 69'; Shinnie 84'; Devlin (yellow card) 89'	Report	van Veen 3'; Goss (yellow card) 57'	Stadium: Almondvale Stadium; Attendance: 1,983; Referee: Chris Graham

28 May 2023 38	Motherwell	3–2	Dundee United	Motherwell
15:00 BST (UTC+1)	van Veen 5'; Miller (yellow card) 52'; Blaney (yellow card) 56'; Spittal 69'; Johnston 82'	Report	McGrath 31' (pen.); Fletcher 49'	Stadium: Fir Park; Attendance: 5,971; Referee: Steven McLean

=== Scottish Cup ===
21 January 2023 Fourth Round	Arbroath	0–2	Motherwell	Arbroath
15:00 GMT (UTC)	J.Baldé (yellow card) 63'	Report	Mandron 26', 90+4'; Slattery (yellow card) 51'; Goss (yellow card) 66' van Veen (yellow card) 90+1'	Stadium: Gayfield Park; Attendance: 4,145; Referee: Willie Collum

11 February 2023 Fifth Round	Raith Rovers	3–1	Motherwell	Kirkcaldy
15:00 GMT (UTC)	Gullan 17'; Stanton 39'; Lang (yellow card) 53'; Easton (yellow card) 61'; Dick (yellow card) 62'; Gonçalves 85'	Report	Slattery (yellow card) 17' van Veen 51'; Spittal (penalty missed) 63'; Butcher (yellow card) 81'; McKinstry (yellow card) 90+2'	Stadium: Stark's Park; Attendance: 4,436; Referee: Nick Walsh

=== League Cup ===
==== Knockout stage ====
31 August 2022 Second Round	Motherwell	4–0	Inverness Caledonian Thistle	Motherwell
19:45 BST (UTC+1)	van Veen 9', 38' (pen.), 67' (pen.); Slattery (yellow card) 19'; Devine 26' (o.g.)	Report	Deas (yellow card) 55'; Ridgers (yellow card) 66'; Boyd (yellow card) 86'	Stadium: Fir Park; Attendance: 3,982; Referee: Kevin Clancy

19 October 2022 Quarterfinal	Motherwell	0–4	Celtic	Motherwell
18:15 BST (UTC+1)	Spittal (yellow card) 55'; Cornelius (yellow card) 78'	Report	Abada 44', 56'; Hatate 60'; Furuhashi 76'	Stadium: Fir Park; Attendance: 8,370; Referee: Don Robertson

=== UEFA Europa Conference League ===
==== Second qualifying round ====
21 July 2022 First leg	Motherwell (Scotland)	0–1	(Republic of Ireland) Sligo Rovers	Motherwell
19:45 BST (UTC+1)	Carroll (yellow card) 7'; Maguire (yellow card) 66'	Report	Blaney (yellow card) 14'; Keena 27'; L.Banks (yellow card) 75'	Stadium: Fir Park; Attendance: 7,227; Referee: Kári á Høvdanum (Faroe Islands)

28 July 2022 Second leg	Sligo Rovers (Republic of Ireland)	2–0 (3–0 agg.)	(Scotland) Motherwell	Sligo, Ireland
19:00 BST (UTC+1)	Blaney 4'; Mata (yellow card) 25' (goal) 90+1'; McDonnell (yellow card) 16'	Report	Morris (yellow card) 47'; McGinn (yellow card) 62'; Efford (yellow card) 90'	Stadium: The Showgrounds; Attendance: 3,876; Referee: Bojan Pandžić (Sweden)

== Squad statistics ==
=== Appearances ===
As of match played 28 May 2023

No.	Pos	Nat	Player	Total		Premiership		Scottish Cup		League Cup		UEFA Europa Conference League	
No.	Pos	Nat	Player	Apps	Goals	Apps	Goals	Apps	Goals	Apps	Goals	Apps	Goals
1	GK	(Scotland) SCO	Liam Kelly	44	0	38	0	2	0	2	0	2	0
2	DF	(Scotland) SCO	Stephen O'Donnell	28	0	14+13	0	1	0	0	0	0	0
3	DF	(Republic of Ireland) IRL	Jake Carroll	3	0	1	0	0	0	0	0	2	0
4	DF	(Scotland) SCO	Ricki Lamie	29	0	22+2	0	1	0	2	0	2	0
5	DF	(Uganda) UGA	Bevis Mugabi	16	1	4+9	1	0	0	0+1	0	2	0
7	MF	(Scotland) SCO	Blair Spittal	42	6	36	6	2	0	2	0	2	0
8	MF	(England) ENG	Callum Slattery	35	4	23+6	4	2	0	2	0	2	0
9	FW	(Netherlands) NED	Kevin van Veen	44	29	36+2	25	1+1	1	2	3	2	0
11	FW	(United States) USA	Joseph Efford	12	1	4+5	1	0	0	1	0	0+2	0
12	FW	(England) ENG	Ollie Crankshaw	6	0	2+2	0	1+1	0	0	0	0	0
14	FW	(Japan) JPN	Riku Danzaki	5	0	1+2	0	1+1	0	0	0	0	0
15	FW	(Scotland) SCO	Jack Aitchison	10	0	2+8	0	0	0	0	0	0	0
16	DF	(Scotland) SCO	Paul McGinn	42	0	36	0	2	0	2	0	2	0
17	MF	(Scotland) SCO	Stuart McKinstry	25	4	10+11	4	1+1	0	1+1	0	0	0
18	MF	(Scotland) SCO	Dean Cornelius	34	0	17+15	0	0+1	0	0+1	0	0	0
20	DF	(Republic of Ireland) IRL	Shane Blaney	9	0	4+4	0	1	0	0	0	0	0
21	FW	(France) FRA	Mikael Mandron	11	3	8+2	1	1	2	0	0	0	0
22	DF	(Scotland) SCO	Max Johnston	19	3	13+4	3	1+1	0	0	0	0	0
23	MF	(England) ENG	Josh Morris	12	0	3+6	0	0	0	0+1	0	2	0
24	DF	(Republic of Ireland) IRL	James Furlong	16	0	15+1	0	0	0	0	0	0	0
26	MF	(Republic of Ireland) IRL	Ross Tierney	23	2	4+14	2	1	0	1+1	0	1+1	0
27	MF	(Germany) GER	Sean Goss	43	1	38	1	1+1	0	2	0	0+1	0
38	MF	(Scotland) SCO	Lennon Miller	5	0	1+3	0	0	0	0+1	0	0	0
47	FW	(Scotland) SCO	Luca Ross	1	0	0+1	0	0	0	0	0	0	0
52	DF	(Republic of Ireland) IRL	Dan Casey	13	0	12	0	1	0	0	0	0	0
53	MF	(Canada) CAN	Harry Paton	7	0	2+5	0	0	0	0	0	0	0
66	MF	(England) ENG	Calum Butcher	14	0	13	0	1	0	0	0	0	0
99	FW	(England) ENG	Jonathan Obika	10	1	5+4	1	1	0	0	0	0	0
Players away from the club on loan:
6	MF	(Scotland) SCO	Barry Maguire	14	0	4+6	0	0	0	0+2	0	2	0
28	FW	(Republic of Ireland) IRL	Robbie Mahon	1	0	0+1	0	0	0	0	0	0	0
29	FW	(Scotland) SCO	Connor Shields	24	0	15+4	0	0+1	0	1+1	0	1+1	0
36	MF	(Scotland) SCO	Kian Speirs	1	0	0+1	0	0	0	0	0	0	0
Players who left Motherwell during the season:
15	DF	(Norway) NOR	Sondre Johansen	22	1	18+1	1	0	0	2	0	0+1	0
20	MF	(Jamaica) JAM	Rolando Aarons	3	0	0+2	0	0	0	0+1	0	0	0
21	FW	(England) ENG	Louis Moult	7	1	1+6	1	0	0	0	0	0	0
24	DF	(England) ENG	Matt Penney	18	0	16	0	0	0	2	0	0	0

=== Goal scorers ===
As of match played 28 May 2023

Ranking	Nation	Position	Number	Name	Scottish Premiership	Scottish Cup	League Cup	UEFA Europa Conference League	Total
1	FW	(Netherlands)	9	Kevin van Veen	25	1	3	0	29
2	MF	(Scotland)	7	Blair Spittal	6	0	0	0	6
3	MF	(Scotland)	17	Stuart McKinstry	4	0	0	0	4
3	MF	(England)	8	Callum Slattery	4	0	0	0	4
5	DF	(Scotland)	22	Max Johnston	3	0	0	0	3
5	FW	(France)	21	Mikael Mandron	1	2	0	0	3
7	MF	(Republic of Ireland)	26	Ross Tierney	2	0	0	0	2
8	FW	(United States)	11	Joseph Efford	1	0	0	0	1
8	DF	(Norway)	15	Sondre Johansen	1	0	0	0	1
8	FW	(England)	21	Louis Moult	1	0	0	0	1
8	FW	(England)	99	Jonathan Obika	1	0	0	0	1
8	DF	(Uganda)	5	Bevis Mugabi	1	0	0	0	1
8	MF	(Germany)	27	Sean Goss	1	0	0	0	1
				Own goal	2	0	1	0	3
TOTALS					53	3	4	0	60

=== Clean sheets ===
As of match played 28 May 2023

Ranking	Nation	Position	Number	Name	Scottish Premiership	Scottish Cup	League Cup	UEFA Europa Conference League	Total
1	GK	(Scotland)	1	Liam Kelly	11	1	1	0	13
TOTALS					11	1	1	0	13

=== Disciplinary record ===
As of match played 28 May 2023

Number	Nation	Position	Name	Premiership		Scottish Cup		League Cup		UEFA Europa Conference League		Total	
Number	Nation	Position	Name	Yellow card	Red card	Yellow card	Red card	Yellow card	Red card	Yellow card	Red card	Yellow card	Red card
1	(Scotland)	GK	Liam Kelly	2	0	0	0	0	0	0	0	2	0
2	(Scotland)	DF	Stephen O'Donnell	5	0	0	0	0	0	0	0	5	0
3	(Republic of Ireland)	DF	Jake Carroll	0	0	0	0	0	0	1	0	1	0
4	(Scotland)	DF	Ricki Lamie	6	1	0	0	0	0	0	0	6	1
7	(Scotland)	MF	Blair Spittal	2	0	0	0	1	0	0	0	3	0
8	(England)	MF	Callum Slattery	14	1	2	0	1	0	0	0	17	1
9	(Netherlands)	FW	Kevin van Veen	5	0	1	0	0	0	0	0	6	0
11	(United States)	FW	Joseph Efford	1	0	0	0	0	0	1	0	2	0
12	(England)	FW	Ollie Crankshaw	1	0	0	0	0	0	0	0	1	0
15	(Scotland)	FW	Jack Aitchison	1	0	0	0	0	0	0	0	1	0
16	(Scotland)	DF	Paul McGinn	4	0	0	0	0	0	1	0	5	0
17	(Scotland)	MF	Stuart McKinstry	3	0	1	0	0	0	0	0	4	0
18	(Scotland)	MF	Dean Cornelius	1	0	0	0	1	0	0	0	2	0
20	(Republic of Ireland)	DF	Shane Blaney	1	0	0	0	0	0	0	0	1	0
23	(England)	MF	Josh Morris	3	0	0	0	0	0	1	0	4	0
24	(Republic of Ireland)	DF	James Furlong	3	0	0	0	0	0	0	0	3	0
27	(Germany)	MF	Sean Goss	10	0	1	0	0	0	0	0	11	0
38	(Scotland)	MF	Lennon Miller	1	0	0	0	0	0	0	0	1	0
52	(Republic of Ireland)	DF	Dan Casey	5	0	0	0	0	0	0	0	5	0
53	(Canada)	MF	Harry Paton	1	0	0	0	0	0	0	0	1	0
66	(England)	MF	Calum Butcher	2	0	1	0	0	0	0	0	3	0
99	(England)	FW	Jonathan Obika	3	0	0	0	0	0	0	0	3	0
Players away from the club on loan::
6	(Scotland)	MF	Barry Maguire	1	0	0	0	0	0	1	0	2	0
29	(Scotland)	FW	Connor Shields	1	1	0	0	0	0	0	0	1	1
36	(Scotland)	MF	Kian Speirs	1	0	0	0	0	0	0	0	1	0
Players who left Motherwell during the season:
15	(Norway)	DF	Sondre Johansen	1	0	0	0	0	0	0	0	1	0
20	(Jamaica)	MF	Rolando Aarons	1	0	0	0	0	0	0	0	1	0
21	(England)	FW	Louis Moult	2	0	0	0	0	0	0	0	2	0
24	(England)	DF	Matt Penney	5	0	0	0	0	0	0	0	5	0
			TOTALS	84	3	6	0	3	0	5	0	98	3

== See also ==
- List of Motherwell F.C. seasons
