= Benny Cairney =

Scottish footballer (1945–2023)

Personal information
- Full name: Bernard Cairney
- Date of birth: 16 October 1945
- Place of birth: Salsburgh, North Lanarkshire, Scotland
- Date of death: January 2023 (aged 77)
- Position: Inside forward

Youth career
- Thorniewood United

Senior career*
Years	Team	Apps	(Gls)
1963–1965	Leicester City	0	(0)
1965	Celtic	0	(0)
1965–1968	Motherwell	43	(7)
1968–1970	Wigan Athletic	59	(8)
- Northwich Victoria
- Ross County
- * Club domestic league appearances and goals

Bernard "Benny" Cairney (16 October 1945 – January 2023) was a Scottish professional footballer who played for Motherwell and Wigan Athletic.

== Biography ==
Cairney began his football career with junior club Thorniewood United. At the age of 17, he was signed by English First Division club Leicester City in October 1963, but was released at his own request two years later without making a first team appearance. He returned to Scotland and signed a three-month contract with Celtic, where he made several reserve team appearance before joining Motherwell. He made his first team breakthrough at Motherwell, and went on to make 54 appearances for the club, scoring 11 goals.

Cairney began a second spell in England in 1968 after joining Northern Premier League club Wigan Athletic, scoring 26 goals in 95 appearances. In 1970, he was sold to Northwich Victoria as part of an exchange deal for Geoff Davies, and went on to score over 50 goals during his two seasons with the club. He finished his professional career in Scotland with Ross County before returning to junior football.

After retiring from football, Cairney worked as a chiropodist and physiotherapist. He died in January 2023, aged 77.
