= James Furlong =

Irish association football player

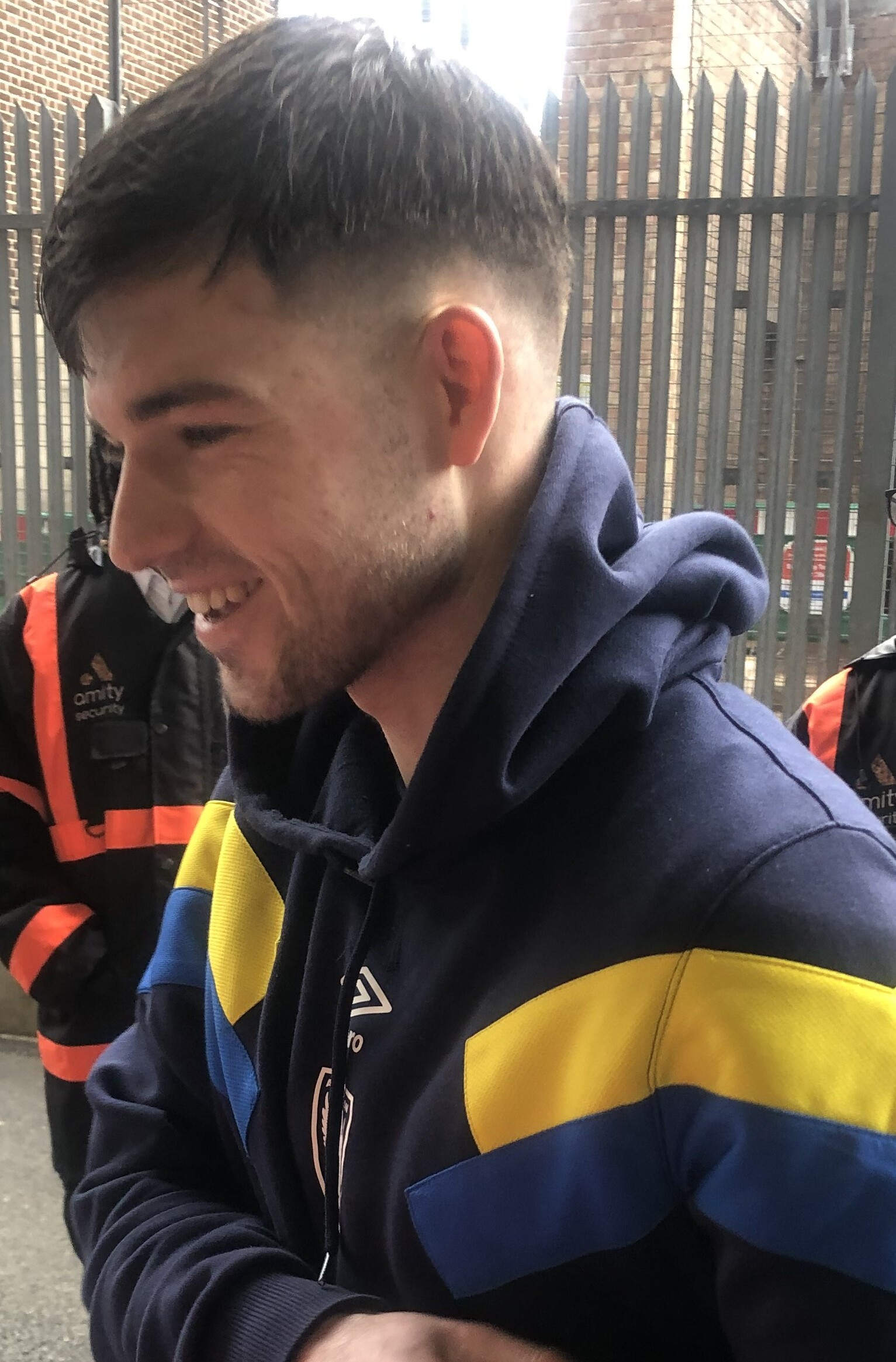
- Furlong in 2025.

Personal information
- Full name: Walter James Byrne Furlong
- Date of birth: 7 June 2002 (age 24)
- Place of birth: Dublin, Ireland
- Height: 1.78 m (5 ft 10 in)
- Positions: Left-back; left wing-back

Team information
- Current team: Walsall
- Number: 29

Youth career
- –2017: St. Joseph's Boys
- 2017: Bray Wanderers
- 2017–2019: Shamrock Rovers
- 2019–2023: Brighton & Hove Albion

Senior career*
Years	Team	Apps	(Gls)
2019	Shamrock Rovers	1	(0)
2022–2023	Brighton & Hove Albion	0	(0)
2023	→ Motherwell (loan)	16	(0)
2023–2026	Hull City	0	(0)
2024–2025	→ AFC Wimbledon (loan)	22	(0)
2026	Maribor	0	(0)
2026–	Walsall	3	(0)

International career^{‡}
2018	Republic of Ireland U16	2	(0)
2018–2019	Republic of Ireland U17	9	(0)
2019	Republic of Ireland U18	2	(0)
2023	Republic of Ireland U21	4	(0)
- * Club domestic league appearances and goals as of 22:37, 25 August 2026 (UTC) ‡ National team caps and goals as of 01:12, 16 October 2024 (UTC)

Walter James Byrne Furlong (born 7 June 2002) is an Irish professional footballer who plays as a left-back or left wing-back for EFL League Two club Walsall.

== Club career ==
=== Shamrock Rovers ===
Furlong started his youth career at St. Joseph's Boys based in Dublin, before joining Bray Wanderers and then Shamrock Rovers in 2017, where he made his senior debut in April 2019, aged 16.

=== Brighton & Hove Albion ===
In July 2019, Furlong joined academy of Premier League side Brighton & Hove Albion. In May 2022, Furlong signed a one-year contract extension until June 2023. He made his professional debut for the first team on 24 August 2022, appearing as a 85th-minute substitute in the 3–0 away win at League One side Forest Green Rovers in the second round of the EFL Cup.

==== Motherwell loan ====
On 31 January 2023 on transfer deadline day, Furlong signed for Scottish Premiership side Motherwell on loan until the end of the season.

=== Hull City ===
Furlong signed for EFL Championship side Hull City for an undisclosed fee on 1 September 2023.

==== AFC Wimbledon loan ====
On 29 July 2024, Furlong joined League Two side AFC Wimbledon on a season-long loan.

=== Maribor ===
Furlong signed for Slovenian PrvaLiga side NK Maribor on the 9 February 2026. However he failed to make a single appearance for the club, being an unused substitute 7 times and was released at the end of the 2025–26 season.

=== Walsall ===
On 24 August 2026 Furlong signed for League Two side Walsall on a one-year contract

== Career statistics ==
As of match played on 25 August 2026

Appearances and goals by club, season and competition
Club	Season	League			National cup (Note: Includes FAI Cup, FA Cup & Scottish Cup)		League cup (Note: Includes League of Ireland Cup & EFL Cup)		Other		Total	
Club	Season	Division	Apps	Goals	Apps	Goals	Apps	Goals	Apps	Goals	Apps	Goals
Shamrock Rovers	2019	LOI Premier Division	1	0	0	0	0	0	0	0	1	0
Brighton & Hove Albion	2022–23	Premier League	0	0	0	0	1	0	—		1	0
Brighton & Hove Albion U21	2022–23	—			—		—		3 (Note: Appearances in EFL Trophy)	0	3	0
Motherwell (loan)	2022–23	Scottish Premiership	16	0	0	0	—		—		16	0
Hull City	2023–24	EFL Championship	0	0	1	0	0	0	—		1	0
Hull City	2024–25	EFL Championship	0	0	—		—		—		0	0
Hull City	2025–26	EFL Championship	0	0	0	0	0	0	—		0	0
Hull City	Total		0	0	1	0	0	0	—		1	0
AFC Wimbledon (loan)	2024–25	EFL League Two	22	0	1	0	3	0	4 (Note: 3 appearances in EFL Trophy; 1 appearance in EFL League Two Playoffs)	0	30	0
NK Maribor	2025–26	Slovenian PrvaLiga	0	0	—		—		—		0	0
Walsall	2026–27	EFL League Two	3	0	0	0	1	0	2	1	3	1
Career total			39	0	2	0	5	0	9	1	55	1
