= John Blair (footballer, born 1910) =

Scottish footballer

Personal information
- Date of birth: 1910
- Place of birth: Pollokshields, Scotland
- Date of death: 1975 (aged 64–65)
- Place of death: Glasgow, Scotland
- Height: 5 ft 11 in (1.80 m)
- Position: Centre half

Senior career*
Years	Team	Apps	(Gls)
–	Yoker Athletic		
1931–1944	Motherwell	246	(2)

International career
1933	Scotland	1	(0)
1934–1936	Scottish League XI	2	(0)
- * Club domestic league appearances and goals

John Blair (1910 – 1975) was a Scottish footballer, who played as a centre-half for Motherwell and Scotland.

Blair played a few games for the Motherwell team that won the Scottish league championship in 1931–32 and he played in two Scottish Cup Finals (a defeat to Celtic in 1933, and a loss to Clyde in 1939). He also represented the Scottish League twice.

In early November 1945, the Clapton Orient programme reported that Blair would be joining the O's as both a player and coach. He made four wartime appearances for Orient.

His nephew Charlie Cox was also a footballer, and also won silverware with Motherwell.
