= Robert Stewart (footballer, born 1894) =

Scottish footballer

Personal information
- Full name: Robert Stewart
- Date of birth: 1894
- Place of birth: Motherwell, Scotland
- Height: 5 ft 7 in (1.70 m)
- Positions: Left half; centre half

Senior career*
Years	Team	Apps	(Gls)
–	Larkhall Thistle		
1916–1924	Motherwell	272	(8)
1924–1927	Ayr United	74	(5)
1927–1928	Royal Albert		
Total		346	(13)
- * Club domestic league appearances and goals

Robert Stewart (born 1894) was a Scottish footballer who played mainly as a left half, for Motherwell – 292 appearances in the Scottish Cup and Scottish Football League (all in its top division) – and Ayr United – 77 matches overall.
