= Charlie Cox (footballer, born 1926) =

Scottish footballer

Personal information
- Full name: Charles John Cox
- Date of birth: 19 February 1926
- Place of birth: Yoker, Scotland
- Date of death: 15 December 2008 (aged 82)
- Place of death: Glasgow, Scotland
- Height: 5 ft 8 in (1.73 m)
- Position: Right half

Senior career*
Years	Team	Apps	(Gls)
–	Yoker Athletic		
1944–1951	Heart of Midlothian	115	(5)
1951–1958	Motherwell	88	(4)
Total		203	(9)
- * Club domestic league appearances and goals

Charles John Cox (19 February 1926 – 15 December 2008) was a Scottish footballer who played as a right half for Heart of Midlothian and Motherwell.

Having started out with Hearts before their successful period later in the decade, he won the Scottish Cup with Motherwell in 1952 only a few months after moving to Lanarkshire along with Tommy Sloan, and although the club was relegated the following season, he was still in the team when they gained promotion immediately as 1953–54 Scottish Division Two winners. He also took part in the 1954 Scottish League Cup Final, a defeat to his former employers. His career was latterly interrupted by injuries. His uncle John Blair was also a footballer, and also won silverware with Motherwell.

Cox never played international football, but some reference books list him as having played once for Scotland in a 3–0 defeat by France in 1948 – the player who did take part at short notice, the right back Sammy Cox, was a distant relative. Additional confusion derived from the fact that the player removed from the original line-up (Billy Campbell) played the same position as Charlie Cox; however in fact other players were moved around to accommodate the change.
