= Bobby McCallum =

Scottish footballer

Personal information
- Full name: Robert Taylor McCallum
- Date of birth: 1940
- Place of birth: Motherwell, Scotland
- Date of death: 14 August 1999 (aged 58–59)
- Height: 5 ft 9 in (1.75 m)
- Position: Left back

Youth career
- Motherwell Bridge Works

Senior career*
| Years | Team | Apps | (Gls) |
| – | Bellshill Athletic | | |
| 1958–1968 | Motherwell | 163 | (11) |

International career
| 1966 | Scottish League XI | 1 | (0) |
- * Club domestic league appearances and goals

Robert Taylor McCallum (1940 – 14 August 1999) was a Scottish footballer who played for Motherwell, mainly as a left back. He was the club's 'player of the year' in the 1962–63 season.

He was selected once for the Scottish Football League XI, in 1966.
