= Willie Dowall =

Scottish footballer (1907–1972)

Personal information
- Full name: William Dowall
- Date of birth: 30 April 1907
- Place of birth: Thornliebank, Scotland
- Date of death: 1972 (aged 64–65)
- Place of death: Eastwood, Scotland
- Position: Utility player

Senior career*
Years	Team	Apps	(Gls)
- Kilbirnie Ladeside
1929–1935	Motherwell	118	(43)
1934–1935	→ St Mirren (loan)	15	(1)
1935–1936	Bury	10	(2)
1936–1937	Lincoln City	5	(0)
1937–1938	Red Star Paris		
1938	Ballymena United		
1938–1940	Notts County	6	(0)
- * Club domestic league appearances and goals

William Dowall (30 April 1907 – 1972) was a Scottish footballer who played in several positions, though mainly centre forward or right back. He made over 100 Scottish Football League appearances for Motherwell during the early 1930s, the most successful period in their history in which they won the league title in 1931–32 and finished in the top three places in the two years either side of that triumph. Motherwell also reached two Scottish Cup finals (1931 and 1933, losing both) but Dowall did not play in either, with injuries interrupting his progress to an extent, as well as his ability to play in several roles which meant he was moved around to accommodate the team's needs but never became fully established in one position.

After a loan spell with St Mirren, Dowall left Scottish football in 1935 and joined Bury, later moving to Lincoln City. He then spent a season in France with Red Star Paris and one in Northern Ireland with Ballymena United, switching back to England with Notts County shortly before the outbreak of World War II.

== See also ==
- List of Motherwell F.C. players
