= Dick Little =

English footballer (1895–??)

Personal information
- Full name: Richard Little
- Date of birth: 30 May 1895
- Place of birth: Ryton-on-Tyne, England
- Height: 1.75 m (5 ft 9 in)
- Position: Right back

Youth career
- 1910–1911: Clara Vale Juniors

Senior career*
Years	Team	Apps	(Gls)
1911–1912	Jarrow Croft		
1912–1914	Newcastle United	3	(0)
1919–1921	Hamilton Academical	81	(6)
1921–1922	→ Cowdenbeath (loan)	37	(5)
1922–1929	Motherwell	168	(11)
1929–1930	Morton	34	(5)
1930	Hamilton Academical	0	(0)
1930–1932	Dunfermline Athletic	66	(7)
1932	Hamilton Academical	0	(0)
1932–1933	Glentoran		
- Newry Town
- * Club domestic league appearances and goals

Richard Little was an English professional footballer who played as a right back in the Scottish League for Motherwell, Hamilton Academical, Dunfermline Athletic, Cowdenbeath and Morton.

== Personal life ==
Little served as an able seaman in the Royal Navy during the First World War. He served on HMS Ferret, HMS Nepean, HMS Excellent and saw action at the Battle of Jutland. After retiring from football, Little became a greenskeeper at Bothwell Castle Golf Club.

== Career statistics ==
Appearances and goals by club, season and competition
Club	Season	League			National cup (Note: Includes FA Cup, Scottish Cup)		Other		Total	
Club	Season	Division	Apps	Goals	Apps	Goals	Apps	Goals	Apps	Goals
Newcastle United	1912–13	First Division	2	0	0	0	—		2	0
Newcastle United	1914–15	First Division	1	0	0	0	—		1	0
Newcastle United	Total		3	0	0	0	—		3	0
Hamilton Academical	1919–20	Scottish First Division	41	4	1	0	4 (Note: Appearances in Lanarkshire Cup)	2	46	6
Hamilton Academical	1920–21	Scottish First Division	40	2	3	1	2	0	45	3
Hamilton Academical	Total		81	6	4	1	6	2	91	9
Cowdenbeath (loan)	1921–22	Scottish Second Division	37	5	3	0	—		40	5
Motherwell	1922–23	Scottish First Division	35	1	4	1	—		39	2
Motherwell	1923–24	Scottish First Division	38	2	3	0	—		41	2
Motherwell	1924–25	Scottish First Division	26	1	3	0	—		29	1
Motherwell	1925–26	Scottish First Division	36	4	1	0	—		37	4
Motherwell	1926–27	Scottish First Division	11	2	0	0	—		11	2
Motherwell	1927–28	Scottish First Division	21	1	2	0	—		23	1
Motherwell	1928–29	Scottish First Division	1	0	0	0	—		1	0
Motherwell	Total		168	11	13	1	—		181	12
Morton	1929–30	Scottish First Division	34	5	1	0	—		35	5
Dunfermline Athletic	1930–31	Scottish Second Division	29	3	2	0	—		31	3
Dunfermline Athletic	1931–32	Scottish Second Division	37	4	3	1	—		40	5
Dunfermline Athletic	Total		66	7	5	1	—		71	8
Career total			389	34	26	3	6	2	421	39

== Honours ==
Hamilton Academical

- Lanarkshire Cup: 1919–20
