= Derek Murray (Scottish footballer) =

Scottish footballer

Personal information
- Date of birth: 26 November 1960 (age 65)
- Place of birth: Dunfermline, Scotland
- Position: Left-back

Youth career
- Oakley United

Senior career*
Years	Team	Apps	(Gls)
1980–1984	Dundee United	16	(0)
1984–1988	Motherwell	95	(5)
1988–1991	Raith Rovers	84	(2)
- * Club domestic league appearances and goals

Derek Murray (born 26 November 1960 in Dunfermline) is a Scottish retired footballer who played left-back. Murray began his career in the early 1980s with Dundee United, making sixteen appearances over a four-year period before joining Motherwell. More of a regular at Fir Park, Murray appeared in nearly 100 league matches before joining Raith Rovers in 1988, making over 80 league appearances before retiring in 1991. Murray moved back to Oakley United, who he had played for at youth level, as assistant manager following the end of his playing career.
