= Robert McSkimming (footballer, born 1885) =

Scottish footballer

Bob McSkimming
Personal information
- Full name: Robert McSkimming
- Date of birth: 29 May 1885
- Place of birth: Lanark, Scotland
- Date of death: 22 December 1952 (aged 67)
- Place of death: Dunedin, New Zealand
- Position: Centre half

Senior career*
Years	Team	Apps	(Gls)
–	Douglas Park		
1907–1910	Albion Rovers	50	(3)
1910–1920	The Wednesday	182	(0)
1915	→ Wishaw Thistle (loan)		
1916–1919	→ Motherwell (loan)	92	(3)
1920–1923	Albion Rovers	71	(0)
1920–1923	Helensburgh	59	(3)
Total		454	(9)

International career
1918	Scotland (wartime)	1	(0)
- * Club domestic league appearances and goals

Robert McSkimming (29 May 1885 – 22 December 1952) was a Scottish footballer who played for clubs including Albion Rovers (two spells), The Wednesday, Motherwell (on a long-term loan during World War I) and Helensburgh, as a centre half.

McSkimming was selected to play for Scotland in an unofficial international in 1918.

He emigrated to New Zealand in the 1920s; another branch of the family had done so several decades earlier, including cousin Peter McSkimming who was a noted politician and businessman.

== See also ==
- List of Motherwell F.C. players
- List of Scotland wartime international footballers
- List of Sheffield Wednesday F.C. players
