= Bobby McSkimming =

Scottish footballer

Personal information
- Full name: Robert Shields McSkimming
- Date of birth: 25 June 1956 (age 70)
- Place of birth: Johnstone, Scotland
- Position: Right back

Senior career*
Years	Team	Apps	(Gls)
1975–1981	Queen's Park	164	(4)
1983–1985	Brisbane Lions		
- * Club domestic league appearances and goals

Robert Shields McSkimming (born 25 June 1956) is a Scottish retired footballer who made over 160 appearances as a right back in the Scottish League for Queen's Park. He later played in the National Soccer League for Brisbane Lions.

== Honours ==
Queens Park

- Scottish League Second Division: 1980–81
