= Sean Goss =

German footballer

Personal information
- Full name: Sean Richard Goss
- Date of birth: 1 October 1995 (age 31)
- Place of birth: Wegberg, Germany
- Height: 1.91 m (6 ft 3 in)
- Position: Midfielder

Team information
- Current team: Stal Rzeszów
- Number: 8

Youth career
- 2004–2012: Exeter City
- 2012–2015: Manchester United

Senior career*
Years	Team	Apps	(Gls)
2015–2017	Manchester United	0	(0)
2017–2019	Queens Park Rangers	6	(0)
2018	→ Rangers (loan)	13	(2)
2019	→ St Johnstone (loan)	6	(0)
2019–2021	Shrewsbury Town	42	(3)
2021–2023	Motherwell	67	(2)
2023–2025	Asteras Tripolis	22	(0)
2025–2026	AS Trenčín	18	(0)
2026–	Stal Rzeszów	5	(1)
- * Club domestic league appearances and goals as of 17:52, 28 August 2026 (UTC)

Sean Richard Goss (born 1 October 1995) is a professional footballer who plays as a midfielder for I liga club Stal Rzeszów. Born in Germany, he has been called up to represent Northern Ireland.

Goss spent his youth career at Exeter City and Manchester United. He left United in January 2017, having never made a senior appearance for the club, to join Queens Park Rangers. After making seven appearances for the club, and spending time on loan in Scotland at Rangers and St Johnstone, he joined Shrewsbury Town in August 2019. He left Shrewsbury after two seasons and returned to Scotland to join Motherwell. In 2023, Goss signed for Super League Greece side Asteras Tripolis on a two-year contract. He moved to Slovak side AS Trenčín in early 2025 whom he left for Stal Rzeszów in mid-2026.

== Club career ==
=== Early career ===
Goss was born in Wegberg and grew up in Germany before moving to England at the age of eight. He joined the Exeter City youth system aged eight. In July 2012, he joined the Manchester United academy for an initial fee of £100,000, after impressing while on trial in a youth tournament in the Netherlands. In July 2015, he was included in the Manchester United first-team squad for a pre-season tour of the United States, and made an appearance against Paris Saint-Germain at Soldier Field on 29 July 2015. He was included in a match day squad for an official match for the first time on 21 November 2015, remaining on the substitutes bench as Manchester United won 2–1 against Watford at Vicarage Road in the Premier League.

=== Queens Park Rangers ===
On 28 January 2017, having never made a senior appearance for Manchester United, Goss joined Queens Park Rangers on a three-and-a-half-year contract for a fee of £500,000. He made his professional debut on 1 February 2017, coming off the substitutes bench in a Championship game against Newcastle United at St James' Park which finished 2–2.

Goss moved on loan to Scottish Premiership club Rangers in January 2018, for the rest of the season. He made his competitive debut for the club on 24 January, in a 2–0 home win against Aberdeen, in which he was one of four debutants for the club. He scored his first goal for Rangers in a 2–1 loss against Hibernian on 3 February. Manager Graeme Murty said that he wanted to sign Goss on a permanent basis, which angered QPR manager Ian Holloway.

Having played one match for QPR in the EFL Cup in September 2018, on 31 January 2019, Goss returned to Scotland's top flight to join St Johnstone on loan until the end of the 2018–19 season. He played seven games for the team from Perth, starting on 3 February when they lost 2–0 at home to leaders Celtic.

=== Shrewsbury Town ===
On 16 August 2019, Goss joined League One side Shrewsbury Town for an undisclosed fee. He made his debut for the club the following day, starting in a 0–0 draw at home to Rochdale. In his second appearance for the club, a 3–2 away win at Accrington Stanley on 20 August, Goss was awarded the man of the match award. On 12 May 2021, it was announced that he would leave Shrewsbury at the end of the season, following the expiry of his contract.

=== Motherwell ===
In August 2021, Goss signed a two-year contract with Scottish Premiership club Motherwell. On 31 May 2023, Motherwell announced that Goss, along with 14 other players were now out of contract with the club.

=== Asteras Tripolis ===
On 22 September 2023, Goss signed for Super League Greece club Asteras Tripolis on a contract until the summer of 2025.

== International career ==
Goss is of Northern Irish descent through his grandparents, and in 2018 the manager of their national team, Michael O'Neill, held talks with him regarding his international allegiance. On 7 March 2023, Goss was called up to the Northern Ireland team for the first time.

== Career statistics ==
As of match played 26 April 2026

Appearances and goals by club, season and competition
Club	Season	League			National cup (Note: Includes Scottish Cup, FA Cup, Greek Cup)		League cup (Note: Includes EFL Cup, Scottish League Cup)		Europe		Other		Total	
Club	Season	Division	Apps	Goals	Apps	Goals	Apps	Goals	Apps	Goals	Apps	Goals	Apps	Goals
Manchester United	2015–16	Premier League	0	0	0	0	0	0	0	0	—		0	0
Manchester United	2016–17	Premier League	0	0	0	0	0	0	0	0	0	0	0	0
Manchester United	Total		0	0	0	0	0	0	0	0	0	0	0	0
Queens Park Rangers	2016–17	Championship	6	0	0	0	0	0	—		—		6	0
Queens Park Rangers	2017–18	Championship	0	0	0	0	0	0	—		—		0	0
Queens Park Rangers	2018–19	Championship	0	0	0	0	1	0	—		—		1	0
Queens Park Rangers	Total		6	0	0	0	1	0	0	0	0	0	7	0
Rangers (loan)	2017–18	Scottish Premiership	13	2	2	0	0	0	0	0	—		15	2
St Johnstone (loan)	2018–19	Scottish Premiership	6	0	1	0	0	0	—		—		7	0
Shrewsbury Town	2019–20	League One	22	0	6	1	0	0	—		3 (Note: Appearances in EFL Trophy)	0	31	1
Shrewsbury Town	2020–21	League One	20	3	1	0	0	0	—		2	0	23	3
Shrewsbury Town	Total		42	3	7	1	0	0	0	0	5	0	54	4
Motherwell	2021–22	Scottish Premiership	29	1	2	0	0	0	—		—		31	1
Motherwell	2022–23	Scottish Premiership	38	1	2	0	2	0	1 (Note: Appearance in UEFA Europa Conference League)	0	—		43	1
Motherwell	Total		67	2	4	0	2	0	1	0	0	0	74	2
Asteras Tripolis	2023–24	Super League Greece	19	0	0	0	—		—		—		19	0
Asteras Tripolis	2024–25	Super League Greece	3	0	3	2	—		—		—		6	2
Asteras Tripolis	Total		22	0	3	2	—		—		—		25	2
AS Trenčín	2024–25	Slovak First Football League	11	0	0	0	—		—		2 (Note: Appearances in Slovak First Football League promotion/relegation play-offs)	0	13	0
AS Trenčín	2025–26	Slovak First Football League	7	0	0	0	—		—		—		7	0
AS Trenčín	Total		18	0	0	0	—		—		2	0	20	0
Stal Rzeszów	2026–27	I liga	0	0	0	0	—		—		—		0	0
Career total			174	7	17	3	3	0	1	0	7	0	202	10
