= 2026–27 Carlisle United F.C. season =

English football club season

Carlisle United
2026–27 season
- Owner: Castle Sports Group
- Chairman: Tom Piatak
- Head Coach: Rob Elliot
- Stadium: Brunton Park
- FA Cup: Second Round
- Highest home attendance: 8,394 :(Round 1 against Worthing
- Lowest home attendance: 5,871 :(Round 5 against Forest Green Rovers
- Biggest win: 4–1 :(Round 3 against Hornchurch)
- Biggest defeat: 2–5 :(Round 10 against Woking)

The 2026–27 season is the 122nd season in the history of Carlisle United Football Club and their second season back in the National League following relegation from League Two in the 2024–25 season.

== Transfers ==
=== In ===
| Date | Pos. | Player | From | Fee | Ref. |
|---|---|---|---|---|---|
| 1 July 2026 (Note: The transfer was announced on 19 June, and would become official on 1 July once his Morecambe contract expired) | CM | Miguel Azeez (ENG) | Morecambe (ENG) | Undisclosed | |
| 1 July 2026 (Note: The transfer was announced on 22 June, and would become official on 1 July once his Forest Green Rovers contract expired) | CM | Harvey Bunker (ENG) | Forest Green Rovers (ENG) | Free | |
| 1 July 2026 (Note: The transfer was announced on 20 June, and would become official on 1 July once his Morecambe contract expired) | GK | Archie Mair (SCO) | Morecambe (ENG) | Free | |
| 1 July 2026 (Note: The transfer was announced on 30 June, and would become official on 1 July once his Gateshead contract expired) | CB | Brad Nicholson (ENG) | Gateshead (ENG) | Undisclosed | |
| 1 July 2026 (Note: The transfer was announced on 30 June, and would become official on 1 July once his Gateshead contract expired) | RB | Kenton Richardson (ENG) | Gateshead (ENG) | Free | |
| 25 July 2026 | CB | Leo Duru (USA) | Blackburn Rovers (ENG) | Free | |
| 12 August 2026 | GK | Adam Desbois (ENG) | Gateshead (ENG) | Undisclosed | |
| 31 August 2026 | CM | Teddy Jenks (ENG) | Worthing (ENG) | Undisclosed | |
| 9 September 2026 | CF | Micah Obiero (KEN) | Wealdstone (ENG) | Undisclosed | |

=== Out ===
| Date | Pos. | Player | To | Fee | Ref. |
|---|---|---|---|---|---|
| 12 August 2026 | GK | Gabriel Breeze (ENG) | Cambridge United (ENG) | Undisclosed | |

=== Loaned in ===
| Date | Pos. | Player | Loaned from | Date until | Ref. |
|---|---|---|---|---|---|
| 27 July 2026 | CB | (England) Toby Mullarkey | (England) Fleetwood Town | 2 January 2027 | |
| 15 August 2026 | CF | (England) Luke Skinner | (England) Bristol City | 7 September 2026 | |
| 29 September 2026 | CB | (England) Tom Anderson | (England) Shrewsbury Town | 31 December 2026 | |
| 28 October 2026 | CM | (Northern Ireland) Callum Camps | (England) Stockport County | 31 December 2026 | |

=== Loaned out ===
| Date | Pos. | Player | Loaned to | Date until | Ref. |
|---|---|---|---|---|---|
| 14 August 2026 | CF | (England) Seb Mason | (Scotland) Stranraer | January 2027 | |
| 15 August 2026 | CM | (England) Amaru Smith | (England) Darlington | 25 September 2026 | |
| 1 September 2026 | CM | (England) Jonah Lowes | (England) Darlington | 30 October 2027 (Note: Originally Johan Lowes was on loan until 5 January 2027 but was recalled) | |
| 8 September 2026 | RB | (England) Hayden Atkinson | (England) Darlington | November 2026 (Note: The original loan was to the end on October but it was extended until the end on November) | |

=== Released / Out of Contract ===
| Date | Pos. | Player | Subsequent club | Fee | Ref. |
|---|---|---|---|---|---|
| 30 June 2026 | CM | Jake Allan (ENG) | Workington (ENG) | Released | |
| 30 June 2026 | RB | Archie Davies (ENG) | Yeovil Town (ENG) | Released | |
| 30 June 2026 | CM | Josh Grant (ENG) | Woking (ENG) | Released | |
| 30 June 2026 | CB | Aaron Hayden (ENG) | Hednesford Town (ENG) | Released | |
| 30 June 2026 | CM | Dan Hopper (ENG) | Workington (ENG) | Released | |
| 30 June 2026 | LW | Jordan Jones (NIR) | South Shields (ENG) | Mutual Consent | |
| 30 June 2026 | LB | Sam Murray (ENG) | Spennymoor Town (ENG) | Released | |
| 30 June 2026 | RW | Freddie O'Donoghue (IOM) | F.C. Isle of Man (IOM) | Released | |
| 30 June 2026 | GK | Thomas Randall (ENG) | MATC Wolfpack (USA) | Released | |
| 30 June 2026 | CM | Ethan Robson (ENG) | | Released | |
| 30 June 2026 | CB | Terell Thomas (LCA) | Slough Town (ENG) | Released | |
| 30 June 2026 | CF | Charlie Wyke (ENG) | Retired | Released | |

== Pre-season and friendlies ==
Win Draw Loss Cancelled Fixtures

| 11 July 2026 Friendly | Motherwell | 2–3 | Carlisle United | Motherwell |
| 15:00 BST | Wilson 11'; Said 48' | Report | Linney 6'; Ajiboye 58'; Mason 59' | Stadium: Fir Park; Attendance: 0 (behind closed doors) |

| 17 July 2026 Friendly | Workington | 5–0 | Carlisle United | Workington |
| 19:45 BST | Dickenson 17'; Palmer 21'; McDonough 28' (o.g.); Hunter 39'; Stephenson 51' | Report | | Stadium: Fibrus Community stadium Attendance: 1,357 |

| 21 July 2026 Friendly | Darlington | 2–4 | Carlisle United | Darlington |
| 19:45 BST | Hedley 29'; Beck 74' (pen.) | Report | Bunker 7'; Azeez 24'; Linney 27'; Whelan 31' | Stadium: Blackwell Meadows; Attendance: 783 |

| 24 July 2026 Friendly | Fleetwood Town | Cancelled (Note: Fixture was cancelled due to unforeseen circumstances.) | Carlisle United | Thornton-Cleveleys |
| 13:00 BST | | | | Stadium: Poolfoot Farm; Attendance: 0 (BCD) |

| 28 July 2026 Friendly | Carlisle United | 0–2 | Salford City | Carlisle |
| 19:30 BST | | Report | Langstaff 14', 56' | Stadium: Brunton Park; Attendance: 2696 (32 away fans); Referee: Aaron Bannister |

| 1 August 2026 Friendly | Derby County U21 | 0–3 | Carlisle United | Derby |
| 13:00 BST | | Report | Wearne 55'; Linney 58'; Bunker 88' | Stadium: Moor Farm Training Centre |

== Competitions ==
=== National League ===
==== League table ====
| Pos | Team | Pld | W | D | L | GF | GA | GD | Pts | Promotion, qualification or relegation |
|---|---|---|---|---|---|---|---|---|---|---|
| 3 | AFC Fylde | 18 | 10 | 3 | 5 | 34 | 27 | +7 | 33 | Qualification for National League play-off semi-finals |
| 4 | Yeovil Town | 18 | 9 | 5 | 4 | 40 | 24 | +16 | 32 | Qualification for the National League play-off quarter-finals |
| 5 | Carlisle United | 18 | 9 | 5 | 4 | 36 | 23 | +13 | 32 | Qualification for the National League play-off quarter-finals |
| 6 | Southend United | 18 | 9 | 5 | 4 | 42 | 31 | +11 | 32 | Qualification for the National League play-off quarter-finals |
| 7 | Worthing | 18 | 9 | 5 | 4 | 35 | 27 | +8 | 32 | Qualification for the National League play-off quarter-finals |

Updated to match(es) played on 21 November 2026. Source: National League official site
Rules for classification: 1) Points; 2) Goal difference; 3) Number of goals scored; 4) Number of matches won; 5) Head-to-head results

==== Results summary ====
| Overall | | | | | | | | Home | | | | | | Away | | | | | |
| Pld | W | D | L | GF | GA | GD | Pts | W | D | L | GF | GA | GD | W | D | L | GF | GA | GD |
|---|---|---|---|---|---|---|---|---|---|---|---|---|---|---|---|---|---|---|---|
| 18 | 9 | 5 | 4 | 36 | 23 | +13 | 32 | 4 | 3 | 2 | 20 | 14 | +6 | 5 | 2 | 2 | 16 | 9 | +7 |

==== Results by round ====
| Round | 1 | 2 | 3 | 4 | 5 | 6 | 7 | 8 | 9 | 10 | 11 | 12 | 13 | 14 | 15 | 16 | 17 | 18 | 19 | 20 | 21 | 22 |
|---|---|---|---|---|---|---|---|---|---|---|---|---|---|---|---|---|---|---|---|---|---|---|
| Ground | H | A | H | A | H | A | H | H | A | H | A | A | H | A | H | A | H | A | H | H | A | H |
| Result | L | D | W | D | W | L | D | D | L | L | W | W | D | W | W | W | W | W | | | | |
| Position | 16 | 17 | 12 | 15 | 9 | 14 | 12 | 14 | 16 | 19 | 16 | 14 | 14 | 11 | 9 | 8 | 6 | 5 | | | | |
| Points | 0 | 1 | 4 | 5 | 8 | 8 | 9 | 10 | 10 | 10 | 13 | 16 | 17 | 20 | 23 | 26 | 29 | 32 | | | | |

A = Away; H = Home; W = Win; D = Draw; L = Loss; P = Postponed

==== Matches ====
On 10 July, the National League fixtures were announced.

Win Draw Loss Fixtures Postponed

| 8 August 2026 1 | Carlisle United | 2–3 | Worthing | Carlisle |
| 15:00 BST | Kelly 42', 88' | Report | Adjetey-Brew (yellow card) 20'; Hutchinson 67' (yellow card) 70'; De-Graft 82'; Aguiar 86' | Stadium: Brunton Park; Attendance: 8,394 (284 away); Referee: Scott Jackson |

| 15 August 2026 2 | Yeovil Town | 1–1 | Carlisle United | Yeovil |
| 15:00 BST | Walker 19'; Gubbins (yellow card) 45+2' (yellow-red card) 65'; Radcliffe (yellow card) 49' | Report | Linney (yellow card) 49'; Bunker 90+6' | Stadium: Huish Park; Attendance: 3,486 (345 away); Referee: Lewis Sandoe |

| 22 August 2026 3 | Carlisle United | 4–1 | Hornchurch | Carlisle |
| 12:30 BST | Azeez 29'; Bunker 46', 66'; Linney 75' | Report | Kizzi 51'; Walker (yellow card) 87' | Stadium: Brunton Park; Attendance: 6,173 (109 away); Referee: Gareth Thomas |

| 28 August 2026 4 | Wealdstone | 1–1 | Carlisle United | Ruislip |
| 19:45 BST | Barrett (yellow card) 61'; Henry 90' | Report | Ajiboye 34'; Kelly (yellow card) 61'; Nicholson (yellow card) 85'; Azeez (yellow card) 89'; Wearne (yellow card) 90+4' | Stadium: Grosvenor Vale; Attendance: 1,995 (438 away); Referee: James Durkin |

| 31 August 2026 5 | Carlisle United | 4–2 | Scunthorpe United | Carlisle |
| 15:00 BST | Azeez 7'; Linney 33' (yellow card) 52'; Williams 38'; Luamba 68' | Report | Richards 28' (yellow card) 36'; Gale (yellow card) 57'; Evans (yellow card) 64'; Barrows 84' | Stadium: Brunton Park; Attendance: 7,656 (452 away); Referee: Dean Watson |

| 5 September 2026 6 | Boreham Wood | 2–1 | Carlisle United | Borehamwood |
| 17:30 BST | Bainbridge (yellow card) 25'; Booty (yellow card) 55'; Bird 80'; Ellis 83' (o.g.); O'Connell (yellow card) 85' | Report | Wearne 60'; Ellis (yellow card) 90+7' | Stadium: Meadow Park; Attendance: 1,743 (522 away); Referee: Harry Wager |

| 12 September 2026 7 | Carlisle United | 2–2 | Southend United | Carlisle |
| 17:30 BST | Kelly 4', 90+6'; Duru (yellow card) 62' | Report | McAdam (yellow card) 7' (goal) 90+2'; Daley-Campbell (yellow card) 43'; Cardwell (yellow card) 53'; Chambers-Parillon 83'; Omochere (yellow card) 90+4' | Stadium: Brunton Park; Attendance: 7,126 (386 away); Referee: Steven Copeland |

| 15 September 2026 8 | Carlisle United | 1–1 | Forest Green Rovers | Carlisle |
| 19:45 BST | Nicholson (yellow card) 26'; Obiero 29'; Jenks (yellow card) 43'; Feeney (yellow card) 84' | Report | Kelly 8'; Abrefa (yellow card) 14'; Sass (yellow card) 67'; Ewing (yellow card) 90+2' | Stadium: Brunton Park; Attendance: 5,871 (58 away); Referee: Andrew Miller |

| 19 September 2026 9 | Eastleigh | 1–0 | Carlisle United | Eastleigh |
| 15:00 BST | Blair 44' | Report | Desbois (yellow card) 60'; Azeez (yellow card) 65' | Stadium: Ten Acres; Attendance: 1,822 (402 away); Referee: Ben Atkinson |

| 26 September 2026 10 | Carlisle United | 2–5 | Woking | Carlisle |
| 15:00 BST | Okoli , 9' (o.g.); Azeez (yellow card) 38'; Harper (yellow card) 79'; Linney 83' (yellow card) 90' | Report | Ogie 7' (yellow card) 88'; Ward 47' (yellow card) 54'; Marquis 56', 69' (pen.), 81' (pen.); Desbois (yellow card) 69'; Okoli (yellow card) 90+3' | Stadium: Brunton Park; Attendance: 6,569 (102 away); Referee: James Westgate |

| 29 September 2026 11 | AFC Fylde | 0–2 | Carlisle United | Wesham |
| 19:45 BST | Whelan (yellow card) 16' | Report | Feeney (yellow card) 28'; Ellis 40' (yellow card) 42'; Linney (yellow card) 47' (goal) 78' | Stadium: Mill Farm; Attendance: 2,369 (1,300 away); Referee: Declan Brown |

| 3 October 2026 12 | Aldershot Town | 1–3 | Carlisle United | Aldershot |
| 15:00 BST | Oshilaja (yellow card) 76'; Stickland (yellow card) 87'; Odusanya 89' | Report | Ajiboye 12' 28'; Ellis (yellow card) 62'; Nicholson (yellow card) 74'; Obiero 90+2' | Stadium: Recreation Ground; Attendance: 2,935 (379 away); Referee: George Laflin |

| 10 October 2026 13 | Carlisle United | 0–0 | Kidderminster Harriers | Carlisle |
| 12:30 BST | Feeney (yellow card) 88'; Linney (penalty missed) | Report | Faakye (yellow card) 83'; Devine (yellow card) 85'; Harries (yellow card) 90' | Stadium: Brunton Park; Attendance: 6,444 (208 away); Referee: Seb Stockbridge |

| 24 October 2026 14 | Solihull Moors | 1–2 | Carlisle United | Solihull |
| 15:00 BST | Wodskou 45+3'; Wakeling (yellow card) 51' | Report | Feeney 69'; Ajiboye 77'; Bunker (yellow card) 90+1' | Stadium: Damson Park; Attendance: 1,206 (585 away); Referee: Kavan Hurn |

| 28 October 2026 15 | Carlisle United | 3–0 | Harrogate Town | Carlisle |
| 19:45 BST | J. Williams 9'; Azeez (red card) 14'; Richardson (yellow card) 22'; Bunker (red card) 30'; Whelan 46'; Galvin 61' | Report | McGuckin (yellow card) 41'; Bristow (yellow card) 43'; M. Williams (yellow card) 54'; Dreyer (yellow card) 63' | Stadium: Brunton Park; Attendance: 6,225 (170 away); Referee: Jamie Robinson |

| 31 October 2026 16 | Altrincham | 2–4 | Carlisle United | Altrincham |
| 15:00 BST | Weaver 5', 76' (yellow card) 77'; Hinchy (yellow card) 34' | Report | Whelan 45'; Camps 61'; Desbois (yellow card) 77'; Richardson (yellow card) 81'; Nicholson (yellow card) 86'; Lowes 90+7' | Stadium: Moss Lane; Attendance: 2,862 (1,058 away); Referee: Dale Baines |

| 14 November 2026 17 | Carlisle United | 2–0 | Boston United | Carlisle |
| 15:00 GMT | Duru 10' (yellow card) 37'; Nicholson (yellow card) 42'; Camps (yellow card) 52'; Richardson (yellow card) 60'; Linney 72' | Report | Sutton (yellow card) 50'; Teale (yellow card) 78'; Rooney (yellow card) 90+5' | Stadium: Brunton Park; Attendance: 7,085 (159 away); Referee: Stuart Morland |

| 21 November 2026 18 | Barrow | 0–2 | Carlisle United | Barrow-in-Furness |
| 15:00 GMT | Oakley (yellow card) 24'; Latty-Fairweather (yellow card) 45'; Edwards (yellow card) 69'; Ligendza (yellow card) 90' | Report | Camps (yellow card) 31'; Linney 43' (pen.) 52' (pen.); Whelan (yellow card) 73'; Bunker (yellow card) 79' | Stadium: Holker Street; Attendance: 4,722 (904 away); Referee: Zac Kennard-Kettle |

| 24 November 2026 19 | Carlisle United | v | Tamworth | Carlisle |
| 19:45 GMT | | | | Stadium: Brunton Park |

| 28 November 2026 20 | Carlisle United | v | Sutton United | Carlisle |
| 15:00 GMT | | | | Stadium: Brunton Park |

| 5 December 2026 21 | FC Halifax Town | v | Carlisle United | Halifax |
| 15:00 GMT | | | | Stadium: The Shay |
Note: Postponed to a later date due to the Second Round FA Cup fixture against York City on the same date

| 8 December 2026 21 | Kidderminster Harriers | v | Carlisle United | Kidderminster |
| 19:45 GMT | | | | Stadium: Aggborough Stadium |

| 20 December 2026 22 | Carlisle United | v | Aldershot Town | Carlisle |
| 15:00 GMT | | | | Stadium: Brunton Park |

=== FA Cup ===
| 17 October 2026 Q4 | Carlisle United | 2–1 | Tamworth | Carlisle |
| 15:00 BST | Linney 7' 45'; Anderson (yellow card) 32'; Nicholson (yellow card) 90+6' | Report | Calder 48' | Stadium: Brunton Park; Attendance: 2,708 (97 away); Referee: Dean Watson |

| 7 November 2026 R1 | Carlisle United | 1–0 | Salford City | Carlisle |
| 15:00 GMT | Wearne (yellow card) 25'; Ajiboye 44'; Nicholson (yellow card) 45+3' | Report | Garbutt (yellow card) 20'; Allen (yellow card) 33'; Graydon (penalty missed) 36' | Stadium: Brunton Park; Attendance: 5,641 (320 away); Referee: Paul Marsden |

| 5 December 2026 R2 | York City | v | Carlisle United | Huntington |
| 15:00 GMT | | | | Stadium: York Community Stadium |

=== FA Trophy ===
| 12 December 2025 R3 | Carlisle United | v | Southport | Carlisle |
| TBD | | | | Stadium: Brunton Park |

== Statistics ==
=== Appearances and goals ===
As of 21 November 2026

Players with no appearances are not included on the list

| No. | Pos | Nat | Player | Total | | National League | | FA Cup | | FA Trophy | |
| No. | Pos | Nat | Player | Apps | Goals | Apps | Goals | Apps | Goals | Apps | Goals |
|---|---|---|---|---|---|---|---|---|---|---|---|
| 1 | GK | (England) ENG | Adam Desbois | 17 | 0 | 17 | 0 | 0 | 0 | 0 | 0 |
| 2 | DF | (England) ENG | Kenton Richardson | 9 | 0 | 4+4 | 0 | 1 | 0 | 0 | 0 |
| 3 | DF | (Scotland) SCO | Cameron Harper | 7 | 0 | 3+4 | 0 | 0 | 0 | 0 | 0 |
| 4 | MF | (England) ENG | Harvey Bunker | 17 | 3 | 16 | 3 | 1 | 0 | 0 | 0 |
| 5 | DF | (England) ENG | Morgan Feeney | 16 | 1 | 12+3 | 1 | 1 | 0 | 0 | 0 |
| 6 | MF | (England) ENG | Miguel Azeez | 16 | 2 | 14+2 | 2 | 0 | 0 | 0 | 0 |
| 7 | FW | (England) ENG | David Ajiboye | 20 | 5 | 16+2 | 4 | 1+1 | 1 | 0 | 0 |
| 8 | MF | (England) ENG | Callum Whelan | 13 | 2 | 6+5 | 2 | 2 | 0 | 0 | 0 |
| 9 | FW | (Republic of Ireland) IRL | Georgie Kelly | 12 | 4 | 11+1 | 4 | 0 | 0 | 0 | 0 |
| 10 | FW | (England) ENG | Regan Linney | 18 | 9 | 12+4 | 7 | 2 | 2 | 0 | 0 |
| 11 | FW | (Democratic Republic of the Congo) COD | Junior Luamba | 6 | 1 | 0+6 | 1 | 0 | 0 | 0 | 0 |
| 12 | DF | (England) ENG | Ryan Galvin | 20 | 1 | 10+8 | 1 | 1+1 | 0 | 0 | 0 |
| 14 | MF | (England) ENG | Elliot Embleton | 3 | 0 | 0+2 | 0 | 0+1 | 0 | 0 | 0 |
| 15 | DF | (England) ENG | Brad Nicholson | 18 | 0 | 15+1 | 0 | 2 | 0 | 0 | 0 |
| 16 | GK | (Scotland) SCO | Archie Mair | 3 | 0 | 1 | 0 | 2 | 0 | 0 | 0 |
| 17 | DF | (United States) USA | Leo Duru | 20 | 1 | 15+3 | 1 | 2 | 0 | 0 | 0 |
| 18 | DF | (England) ENG | Jack Ellis | 15 | 1 | 10+4 | 1 | 0+1 | 0 | 0 | 0 |
| 19 | FW | (Kenya) KEN | Micah Obiero | 10 | 3 | 4+5 | 3 | 1 | 0 | 0 | 0 |
| 20 | MF | (England) ENG | Stephen Wearne | 17 | 1 | 3+12 | 1 | 2 | 0 | 0 | 0 |
| 22 | DF | (England) ENG | Josh Williams | 18 | 2 | 10+6 | 2 | 0+2 | 0 | 0 | 0 |
| 25 | FW | (England) ENG | Jonah Lowes | 4 | 1 | 1+2 | 1 | 0+1 | 0 | 0 | 0 |
| 26 | DF | (Uganda) UGA | Bevis Mugabi | 0 | 0 | 0 | 0 | 0 | 0 | 0 | 0 |
| 29 | FW | (England) ENG | Luke Armstrong | 3 | 0 | 0+2 | 0 | 0+1 | 0 | 0 | 0 |
| 30 | MF | (England) ENG | Teddy Jenks | 12 | 0 | 9+2 | 0 | 1 | 0 | 0 | 0 |
| 31 | DF | (England) ENG | Tom Anderson | 4 | 0 | 1+2 | 0 | 1 | 0 | 0 | 0 |
| 32 | MF | (Northern Ireland) NIR | Callum Camps | 5 | 1 | 3+1 | 1 | 1 | 0 | 0 | 0 |
| 33 | MF | (England) ENG | Will Rafferty | 1 | 0 | 0 | 0 | 0+1 | 0 | 0 | 0 |
| 37 | MF | (England) ENG | Harvey Macadam | 0 | 0 | 0 | 0 | 0 | 0 | 0 | 0 |
| 40 | DF | (England) ENG | Toby Mullarkey | 8 | 0 | 5+1 | 0 | 1+1 | 0 | 0 | 0 |
Player(s) who featured whilst on loan but returned to parent club during the season:
| 19 | FW | (England) ENG | Luke Skinner | 3 | 0 | 0+3 | 0 | 0 | 0 | 0 | 0 |

=== Team sheet per fixture ===
As of 22 November 2026

| No. | Pos. | Nat. | Player | League Rounds | | | | | | | | | | | | | FAC | LR | | | FAC | LR | | Discipline | |
| No. | Pos. | Nat. | Player | R1 | R2 | R3 | R4 | R5 | R6 | R7 | R8 | R9 | R10 | R11 | R12 | R13 | Q4 | R14 | R15 | R16 | R1 | R17 | R18 | YC | RC |
|---|---|---|---|---|---|---|---|---|---|---|---|---|---|---|---|---|---|---|---|---|---|---|---|---|---|
| 1 | GK | (England) | Adam Desbois | | X | X | X | X | X | X | X | X | X | X | X | X | u | X | X | X | u | X | X | 2 | 0 |
| 1 | GK | (England) | Gabriel Breeze | u | Sold | | | | | | | | | | | | | | | | | | | 0 | 0 |
| 2 | DF | (England) | Kenton Richardson | | s | u | Injured | | | | | s | u | s | u | u | X | s | X | X | u | X | X | 3 | 0 |
| 3 | DF | (Scotland) | Cameron Harper | X | X | s | u | s | s | u | | X | s | | | u | Injured | | | | | | | 1 | 0 |
| 4 | MF | (England) | Harvey Bunker | X | X^{1} | X^{2} | X | X | X | X | X | X | X | X | X | X | X | X | X | Susp. | | | X | 1 | 1 |
| 5 | DF | (England) | Morgan Feeney | | | s | s | s | X | X | X | | X | X | X | X | | X^{1} | X | X | X | X | X | 3 | 0 |
| 6 | MF | (England) | Miguel Azeez | X | X | X^{1} | X | X^{1} | X | X | X | X | X | X | X | X | u | s | X | Susp. | | | s | 4 | 1 |
| 7 | FW | (England) | David Ajiboye | X | X | X | X^{1} | X | X | X | X | X | X | s | X^{2} | X | s | s^{1} | X | X | X^{1} | X | X | 0 | 0 |
| 8 | MF | (England) | Callum Whelan | X | Injured | | | | | | | s | s | s | s | s | X | X | X^{1} | X^{1} | X | X | X | 1 | 0 |
| 9 | FW | (Republic of Ireland) | Georgie Kelly | X^{2} | X | X | X | X | X | X^{2} | X | X | X | X | Injured | | | | | | u | s | | 1 | 0 |
| 10 | FW | (England) | Regan Linney | X | X | X^{1} | X | X^{1} | s | s | s | | s^{1} | X^{1} | X | X | X^{2} | X | u | X | X | X^{1} | X^{2} | 4 | 0 |
| 11 | FW | (Democratic Republic of the Congo) | Junior Luamba | | | | s | s^{1} | s | s | s | s | Injured | | | | | | | | | | | 0 | 0 |
| 12 | DF | (England) | Ryan Galvin | X | X | X | X | X | X | s | X | X | X | s | s | X | s | s | s^{1} | s | X | s | s | 0 | 0 |
| 14 | MF | (England) | Elliot Embleton | Injured | | | | | | | | | | | | | | | | s | s | s | u | 0 | 0 |
| 15 | DF | (England) | Brad Nicholson | s | X | X | X | X | X | X | X | | X | X | X | X | X | X | X | X | X | X | Sp. | 7 | 0 |
| 16 | GK | (Scotland) | Archie Mair | X | u | u | u | u | u | u | u | u | u | u | u | u | X | u | u | u | X | u | u | 0 | 0 |
| 17 | DF | (United States) | Leo Duru | X | X | X | X | s | s | X | s | X | X | X | X | X | X | X | X | X | X | X^{1} | X | 2 | 0 |
| 18 | DF | (England) | Jack Ellis | u | s | X | X | X | X | X | X | X | s | X^{1} | X | X | Injured | | | | s | s | s | 3 | 0 |
| 19 | FW | (Kenya) | Micah Obiero | Not on roster | | | | | | s | X^{1} | X | Int. | | s^{1} | s | X | X | X | s^{1} | Int. | | s | 0 | 0 |
| 19 | FW | (England) | Luke Skinner | | s | s | u | s | u | Loan completed | | | | | | | | | | | | | | 0 | 0 |
| 20 | MF | (England) | Stephen Wearne | s | | s | s | X | X^{1} | s | s | s | X | s | s | s | X | s | s | s | X | Injured | | 2 | 0 |
| 21 | FW | (England) | Hayden Atkinson | | u | | | u | | Out on loan | | | | | | | | | | | | | | 0 | 0 |
| 22 | DF | (England) | Josh Williams | s | s | s | s | X^{1} | X | X | u | s | s | X | X | | s | X | X^{1} | X | s | X | X | 0 | 0 |
| 23 | FW | (England) | Seb Mason | u | Out on loan | | | | | | | | | | | | | | | | | | | 0 | 0 |
| 25 | FW | (England) | Jonah Lowes | u | s | | u | | Out on loan | | | | | | | | | | | s^{1} | s | X | | 0 | 0 |
| 29 | FW | (England) | Luke Armstrong | Injured | | | | | | | | | | | | | | | | | s | s | s | 0 | 0 |
| 30 | MF | (England) | Teddy Jenks | Not on roster | | | | | s | X | X | X | X | X | X | X | X | X | s | X | Injured | | | 0 | 0 |
| 31 | FW | (England) | Tom Anderson | Not on roster | | | | | | | | | | u | s | s | X | X | Injured | | | | | 1 | 0 |
| 32 | MF | (Northern Ireland) | Callum Camps | Not on roster | | | | | | | | | | | | | | | s | X^{1} | X | X | X | 2 | 0 |
| 33 | MF | (England) | Will Rafferty | | | | | | | | | u | | | | | s | | | | u | | | 0 | 0 |
| 40 | DF | (England) | Toby Mullarkey | X | X | X | X | Injured | | | | | | | | | s | u | s | u | X | u | X | 0 | 0 |

Key

- X = Started the match
- s = Appeared as a substitute
- u = Unused substitute
- Superscript number (e.g., X^{1}) = Number of goals scored in that round
- On loan from another club
- Sold to another club
- On loan to another club
- Yellow card
- Red card
- Suspended
- International Duty
- Injured
