= 2024–25 Motherwell F.C. season =

Motherwell
2024–25 season
- Chairman: James McMahon (until 1 August); Kyrk Macmillan
- Manager: Stuart Kettlewell (until 27 January); Stephen Frail (Caretaker) (27 January-17 February); Michael Wimmer (17 February-23 May)
- Stadium: Fir Park
- Premiership: 8th
- Scottish Cup: Fourth round
- League Cup: Semi-final
- Top goalscorer: League: Tom Sparrow (6); Tawanda Maswanhise (6); Callum Slattery (6); All: Tom Sparrow (6); Tawanda Maswanhise (6); Callum Slattery (6)
- Highest home attendance: 8,728 vs Rangers (29 December 2024)
- Lowest home attendance: 2,587 vs Edinburgh City (13 July 2024)
- Average home league attendance: 5,706 (5 January 2025)
Home colours	Away colours	Third colours

The 2024–25 season was Motherwell's fortieth consecutive season in the top flight of Scottish football, having been promoted from the Scottish First Division at the end of the 1984–85 season.

== Season review ==
=== Preseason ===
On 20 May 2024, Motherwell announced that they would have a 7-day training camp in the Netherlands from 24 June, during which they would play two friendly matches, against Twente and DSVD Deurningen.

On 24 May, Motherwell announced their retained and released list, with Liam Kelly, Callan Elliot, Calum Butcher, Barry Maguire and Blair Spittal all leaving the club at the end of the season when their contracts expire, whilst Matthew Connelly, Stephen O'Donnell, Bevis Mugabi, Callum Slattery and Sam Nicholson had all been offered new contracts, with Paul McGinn and Aston Oxborough both extending their contracts until the summer of 2025. Meanwhile youth team players, Olly Whyte, Max Ross, Ewan Wilson and Mark Ferrie all extended their contract until the summer of 2025, whilst Shay Nevans, Robbie Garcia, Arran Bone, Kyle Aitken, Josh Bogan and Adam MacDonald would be leaving the club at the end of their contracts.

On 30 May, Jonathan Obika announced his retirement from football and joined the coaching staff at Motherwell.

On 31 May, Motherwell announced that they had signed Sam Nicholson to a permanent two-year contract, after joining the club on loan from Colorado Rapids in January 2024.

=== June ===
On 3 June, Motherwell announced that Stephen O'Donnell had signed a new two-year contract with the club.

On 7 June, Motherwell announced that Bevis Mugabi would be leaving the club having turned down a new contract with the club following the expiration of his last one at the end of the previous season.

On 11 June, Motherwell announced the signing of Kofi Balmer to a two-year contract, with the option of a third, from Crystal Palace.

On 12 June, Motherwell announced the signing of free-agent Tom Sparrow to a two-year contract, with the option of a third, after he'd left Stoke City at the end of his contract.

On 15 June, Motherwell announced the signing of free-agent John Koutroumbis to a two-year contract, after he'd left Perth Glory at the end of his contract.

On 19 June, Motherwell announced the signing of free-agent Ross Callachan to a one-year contract, with the option of an additional year, after he'd left Ross County at the end of his contract the previous month.

On 20 June, Motherwell announced that Ross Tierney left the club to return to Bohemians for an undisclosed fee. Later the same day, Motherwell announced the signing of Zach Robinson, to a two-year contract following the completion of his AFC Wimbledon contract, and of Filip Stuparević to a two-year contract, with an option of a third, after his Domžale contract had expired. Motherwell also announced that Callum Slattery had signed a new one-year contract, with the option of an additional year.

On 24 June, Motherwell announced the signing of free-agent Liam Gordon to a two-year contract, after he'd turned down a new contract with St Johnstone.

On 28 June, Motherwell announced the season-long loan signing of Krisztián Hegyi from West Ham United.

=== July ===
On 2 July, Motherwell announced the signing of Steve Seddon to a one-year contract, with the option of another, after leaving Oxford United.

On 12 July, Motherwell announced that they had signed professional contracts with Eight academy graduates, Jack McConnell, Jon-Joe Friel, Jay Gillies, Andrew Arnott, Zander McAllister, Rocco McColm, Nathan Lawson and Harry McLean. Later the same day Motherwell announced that Matthew Connelly had signed a new one-year contract with the club.

On 15 July, Motherwell announced Paul McGinn as their new club captain and Stephen O'Donnell as their new vice-captain. Later the same day Motherwell announced the season-long loan signing of Marvin Kaleta from Wolverhampton Wanderers.

On 16 July, Motherwell announced that Theo Bair had left the club to join AJ Auxerre for an undisclosed fee.

On 17 July, Motherwell announced that Olly Whyte had joined Cowdenbeath on loan until January 2025.

On 30 July, Motherwell announced the signing of Apostolos Stamatelopoulos from Newcastle Jets for an undisclosed fee, on a contract until 2027.

=== August ===
On 13 August, Motherwell announced the return of Tony Watt on a season-long loan deal from Dundee United.

On 14 August, goalkeeper Matthew Connelly joined East Kilbride on loan until January.

On 18 August, Motherwell announced the signing of free-agent Tawanda Maswanhise on a short-term contract until January.

On 30 August, Motherwell announced the return of Jack Vale to the club, on a season-long loan deal from Blackburn Rovers. Later the same day, Motherwell announced the season-long loan signing of Jair Tavares from Hibernian, whilst Luca Ross joined Annan Athletic on loan until January 2025.

=== September ===
On 21 September, Max Ross joined Albion Rovers on loan until January.

On 26 September, Mark Ferrie joined Bonnyrigg Rose on loan until January.

On 27 September, Filip Stuparević joined Greenock Morton on loan for the remainder of the season, whilst Brannan McDermott joined Broomhill on loan until January.

On 30 September, Dylan Wells joined Edinburgh City on loan until January.

=== October ===
On 10 October, Motherwell announced that Aston Oxborough had signed a new contract with the club, until the summer of 2027 with the option of a further year. The following day, 11 October, Motherwell announced that Tawanda Maswanhise had also extended his contract with the club, until the summer of 2026, with the option of an additional year.

On 17 October, Motherwell announced that Ewan Wilson had extended his contract with the club until the summer of 2027, with the option of an additional year.

=== January ===
On 5 January, Callum Slattery returned to the first team in Motherwell's 2-0 win over Aberdeen after over a year out due to injury.

On 7 January, Motherwell announced the signing of Kai Andrews on loan from Coventry City for the remainder of the season.

On 9 January, Motherwell announced that Olly Whyte, Matthew Connelly, Luca Ross, Max Ross, Mark Ferrie Brannan McDermott, and Dylan Wells all had had their loan deals extended until the end of the season.

On the morning of 11 January, Motherwell announced that Krisztián Hegyi had been recalled by West Ham United and that Archie Mair had joined on loan from Norwich City for the remainder of the season.

On 23 January, Motherwell announced the loan signing of Ellery Balcombe from Brentford for the remainder of the season. The following day, 24 January, Motherwell announced the loan signing of Luke Armstrong from Carlisle United until the end of the season.

On 25 January, before their league match against St Johnstone, Motherwell announced the signing of free-agent Dominic Thompson on a contract to the end of the season.

On 27 January, the Motherwell board announced that they had accepted Stuart Kettlewell's resignation, with Stephen Frail taking charger for their game against Celtic on 2 February.

=== February ===
On 1 February, Motherwell announced the loan signings of Luke Plange from Crystal Palace and Will Dickson from Manchester City both until the end of the season.

On 3 February, Motherwell announced the signing of free-agent Calum Ward on a contract until the end of the season.

On 17 February, Motherwell announced the appointment of Michael Wimmer as their new Manager.

=== March ===
On 18 March, Motherwell announced that they had extended their contracts with Stephen O'Donnell and Callum Slattery, until the end of the 2025–26 season.

=== April ===
On 2 April, Motherwell announced that they had signed a new contract with Tom Sparrow, until the summer of 2027 with the club holding a one-year extension option.

On 16 April, Motherwell announced that they had signed a contract extension with Luca Ross, until the summer of 2027.

On 30 April, Motherwell announced that they had extended their contract with Andy Halliday for the 2025–26 season, whilst also extending the contract with Calum Ward for the 2025–26 season with the club holding the option of an additional year.

=== May ===
On 9 May, Motherwell announced that they had signed a new contract with Paul McGinn, until the summer of 2026.

On 23 May, Motherwell confirmed that Manager Michael Wimmer had left the club to take up a similar role at SSV Jahn Regensburg.

On 28 May, Motherwell announced that Shane Blaney, Ross Callachan, Mark Ferrie, Max Ross, Brannan McDermott, Zack Flatman, Derin Marshall, Ross Nelson and Zack Tomany would all leave the club at the end of their contracts. Olly Whyte, Campbell Forrest, Mikey Booth and Scott Williamson had extended their contracts, whilst contract discussions where on going with Steve Seddon, Dan Casey, Dominic Thompson, Davor Zdravkovski, Harry Paton and Moses Ebiye.

== Squad ==
As of match played 18 May 2025

No.	Name	Nationality	Position	Date of birth (age)	Signed from	Signed in	Contract ends	Apps.	Goals
Goalkeepers
1	Archie Mair	(Scotland)	GK	10 February 2001 (aged 24)	on loan from Norwich City	2025	2025	2	0
13	Aston Oxborough	(England)	GK	9 May 1998 (aged 27)	Unattached	2022	2027(+1)	32	0
61	Calum Ward	(England)	GK	17 October 2000 (aged 24)	Unattached	2025	2026 (+1)	0	0
88	Ellery Balcombe	(England)	GK	15 October 1999 (aged 25)	on loan from Brentford	2025	2025	12	0
Defenders
2	Stephen O'Donnell	(Scotland)	DF	11 May 1992 (aged 32)	Kilmarnock	2020	2026	183	5
3	Steve Seddon	(England)	DF	25 December 1997 (aged 27)	Unattached	2024	2025(+1)	17	0
4	Liam Gordon	(Scotland)	DF	26 January 1996 (aged 29)	St Johnstone	2024	2026	33	1
5	Kofi Balmer	(Northern Ireland)	DF	19 September 2000 (aged 24)	Unattached	2024	2026 (+1)	24	1
15	Dan Casey	(Republic of Ireland)	DF	29 October 1997 (aged 27)	Unattached	2023	2025	85	7
16	Paul McGinn	(Scotland)	DF	22 October 1990 (aged 34)	Hibernian	2022	2026	92	2
20	Shane Blaney	(Republic of Ireland)	DF	20 January 1999 (aged 26)	Sligo Rovers	2022	2025	54	3
21	Marvin Kaleta	(Democratic Republic of the Congo)	DF	14 September 2004 (aged 20)	on loan from Wolverhampton Wanderers	2024	2025	26	0
22	John Koutroumbis	(Australia)	DF	6 March 1998 (aged 27)	Unattached	2024	2026	8	0
23	Ewan Wilson	(Scotland)	DF	19 November 2004 (aged 20)	Academy	2021	2027 (+1)	41	1
56	Dominic Thompson	(England)	DF	26 July 2000 (aged 24)	Unattached	2025	2025	15	0
Midfielders
6	Davor Zdravkovski	(North Macedonia)	MF	20 March 1998 (aged 27)	Unattached	2023	2025	62	1
7	Tom Sparrow	(Wales)	MF	6 December 2002 (aged 22)	Unattached	2024	2027 (+1)	37	6
8	Callum Slattery	(England)	MF	8 February 1999 (aged 25)	Southampton	2021	2026	110	15
11	Andy Halliday	(Scotland)	MF	11 October 1991 (aged 33)	Heart of Midlothian	2024	2026	60	5
12	Harry Paton	(Canada)	MF	23 May 1998 (aged 26)	Unattached	2023	2025	63	2
18	Ross Callachan	(Scotland)	MF	4 September 1993 (aged 31)	Unattached	2024	2025 (+1)	1	0
38	Lennon Miller	(Scotland)	MF	25 August 2006 (aged 18)	Academy	2022	2026	76	6
54	Kai Andrews	(Wales)	MF	6 August 2006 (aged 18)	on loan from Coventry City	2025	2025	12	0
Forwards
9	Zach Robinson	(England)	FW	11 June 2002 (aged 22)	Unattached	2024	2026	19	2
14	Apostolos Stamatelopoulos	(Australia)	FW	9 April 1999 (aged 26)	Newcastle Jets	2024	2027	18	5
17	Filip Stuparević	(Serbia)	FW	30 August 2000 (aged 24)	Unattached	2024	2026	4	1
19	Sam Nicholson	(Scotland)	FW	20 January 1995 (aged 30)	Colorado Rapids	2024	2026	26	2
24	Moses Ebiye	(Nigeria)	FW	28 April 1997 (aged 28)	Unattached	2024	2025	40	7
52	Tony Watt	(Scotland)	FW	29 December 1993 (aged 31)	on loan from Dundee United	2024	2025	100	20
55	Tawanda Maswanhise	(Zimbabwe)	FW	20 November 2002 (aged 22)	Unattached	2024	2026(+1)	34	6
57	Luke Plange	(England)	FW	4 November 2002 (aged 22)	on loan from Crystal Palace	2025	2025	4	0
58	Will Dickson	(England)	FW	25 November 2004 (aged 20)	on loan from Manchester City	2025	2025	7	0
59	Luke Armstrong	(England)	FW	2 July 1996 (aged 28)	on loan from Carlisle United	2025	2025	14	4
77	Jack Vale	(Wales)	FW	3 March 2001 (aged 24)	on loan from Blackburn Rovers	2024	2025	21	3
90	Jair Tavares	(Portugal)	FW	13 February 2001 (aged 24)	on loan from Hibernian	2024	2025	10	0
Development team
25	Max Ross	(Scotland)	DF	10 April 2006 (aged 19)	Academy	2022	2025	0	0
26	Olly Whyte	(Scotland)	MF	27 November 2006 (aged 18)	Academy	2023	2025	0	0
27	Dylan Wells	(Scotland)	MF	20 March 2006 (aged 19)	Academy	2022	2026	6	0
28	Luca Ross	(Scotland)	FW	11 August 2006 (aged 18)	Academy	2022	2027	5	1
29	Mark Ferrie	(Scotland)	FW	2 December 2005 (aged 19)	Academy	2022	2025	12	0
30	Brannan McDermott	(Scotland)	DF	1 March 2006 (aged 19)	Academy	2022	2025	1	0
31	Matthew Connelly	(Scotland)	GK	2 March 2003 (aged 22)	Academy	2019	2025	0	0
32	Zack Flatman	(Scotland)	DF	3 February 2007 (aged 18)	Academy	2023	2025	0	0
33	Derin Marshall	(Scotland)	DF	16 March 2007 (aged 18)	Academy	2023	2025	0	0
34	Scott Williamson	(Scotland)	DF	12 March 2007 (aged 18)	Academy	2023	2025	0	0
35	Campbell Forrest	(Scotland)	MF	10 October 2007 (aged 17)	Academy	2023	2025	0	0
36	Ross Nelson	(Scotland)	DF	25 July 2007 (aged 17)	Academy	2023	2025	0	0
37	Mikey Booth	(Scotland)	MF	2 January 2007 (aged 18)	Academy	2023	2025	0	0
39	Devon Johnston	(Scotland)	FW	21 June 2007 (aged 17)	Academy	2023	2025	0	0
40	Zack Tomany	(Scotland)	FW	6 April 2007 (aged 18)	Academy	2023	2025	0	0
41	Jack McConnell	(Scotland)	GK	20 June 2008 (aged 16)	Academy	2024		0	0
42	Jon-Joe Friel	(Scotland)	DF	2 February 2008 (aged 17)	Academy	2024		0	0
43	Jay Gillies	(Scotland)	DF	5 February 2008 (aged 17)	Academy	2024		0	0
44	Andrew Arnott	(Scotland)	DF	7 May 2008 (aged 17)	Academy	2024		0	0
45	Zander McAllister	(Scotland)	MF	22 April 2008 (aged 17)	Academy	2024		0	0
46	Rocco McColm	(Scotland)	MF	29 September 2008 (aged 16)	Academy	2024		0	0
47	Nathan Lawson	(Scotland)	FW	24 February 2008 (aged 17)	Academy	2024		0	0
48	Harry McLean	(Scotland)	FW	19 June 2008 (aged 16)	Academy	2024		0	0
U18
Left during the season
1	Krisztián Hegyi	(Hungary)	GK	24 September 2002 (aged 22)	on loan from West Ham United	2024	2025	2	0
14	Theo Bair	(Canada)	FW	27 August 1999 (aged 25)	Unattached	2023	2025	41	15

== Transfers ==
=== In ===
Date	Position	Nationality	Name	From	Fee	Ref
1 June 2024	MF	(Scotland)	Sam Nicholson	Colorado Rapids	Free	
11 June 2024	DF	(Northern Ireland)	Kofi Balmer	Crystal Palace	Undisclosed	
12 June 2024	MF	(Wales)	Tom Sparrow	Unattached	Free	
15 June 2024	DF	(Australia)	John Koutroumbis	Unattached	Free	
19 June 2024	MF	(Scotland)	Ross Callachan	Unattached	Free	
20 June 2024	FW	(England)	Zach Robinson	Unattached	Free	
20 June 2024	FW	(Serbia)	Filip Stuparević	Unattached	Free	
24 June 2024	DF	(Scotland)	Liam Gordon	St Johnstone	Free	
2 July 2024	DF	(England)	Steve Seddon	Unattached	Free	
30 July 2024	FW	(Australia)	Apostolos Stamatelopoulos	Newcastle Jets	Undisclosed	
18 August 2024	FW	(Zimbabwe)	Tawanda Maswanhise	Unattached	Free	
25 January 2025	DF	(England)	Dominic Thompson	Unattached	Free	
3 February 2025	GK	(England)	Calum Ward	Unattached	Free	

=== Loans in ===
Date from	Position	Nationality	Name	From	Date to	Ref.
28 June 2024	GK	(Hungary)	Krisztián Hegyi	West Ham United	11 January 2024	
15 July 2024	DF	(Democratic Republic of the Congo)	Marvin Kaleta	Wolverhampton Wanderers	End of season	
13 August 2024	FW	(Scotland)	Tony Watt	Dundee United	End of season	
30 August 2024	FW	(Wales)	Jack Vale	Blackburn Rovers	End of season	
30 August 2024	FW	(Portugal)	Jair Tavares	Hibernian	End of season	
7 January 2025	MF	(Wales)	Kai Andrews	Coventry City	End of season	
11 January 2025	GK	(Scotland)	Archie Mair	Norwich City	End of season	
23 January 2025	GK	(England)	Ellery Balcombe	Brentford	End of season	
24 January 2025	FW	(England)	Luke Armstrong	Carlisle United	End of season	
1 February 2025	FW	(England)	Luke Plange	Crystal Palace	End of season	
1 February 2025	FW	(England)	Will Dickson	Manchester City	End of season	

=== Out ===
Date	Position	Nationality	Name	To	Fee	Ref.
9 June 2024	FW	(Nigeria)	Muhammad Adam	Stranraer	Undisclosed	
20 June 2024	MF	(Republic of Ireland)	Ross Tierney	Bohemians	Undisclosed	
16 July 2024	FW	(Canada)	Theo Bair	AJ Auxerre	Undisclosed	

=== Loans out ===
Date from	Position	Nationality	Name	To	Date to	Ref.
17 July 2024	MF	(Scotland)	Olly Whyte	Cowdenbeath	End of season	
14 August 2024	GK	(Scotland)	Matthew Connelly	East Kilbride	End of season	
30 August 2024	FW	(Scotland)	Luca Ross	Annan Athletic	End of season	
21 September 2024	DF	(Scotland)	Max Ross	Albion Rovers	End of season	
26 September 2024	FW	(Scotland)	Mark Ferrie	Bonnyrigg Rose	End of season	
27 September 2024	DF	(Scotland)	Brannan McDermott	Broomhill	End of season	
27 September 2024	FW	(Serbia)	Filip Stuparević	Greenock Morton	End of season	
30 September 2024	MF	(Scotland)	Dylan Wells	Edinburgh City	End of season	

=== Released ===
Date	Position	Nationality	Name	Joined	Date	Ref.
31 May 2025	DF	(England)	Dominic Thompson	Kilmarnock	2 August 2025	
31 May 2025	DF	(Republic of Ireland)	Shane Blaney	Livingston	13 June 2025	
31 May 2025	DF	(Republic of Ireland)	Dan Casey	Wycombe Wanderers	14 June 2025	
31 May 2025	DF	(Scotland)	Max Ross			
31 May 2025	DF	(Scotland)	Brannan McDermott	Gala Fairydean Rovers		
31 May 2025	DF	(Scotland)	Zack Flatman	Hamilton Academical		
31 May 2025	DF	(Scotland)	Derin Marshall	Dumbarton	22 July 2025	
31 May 2025	DF	(Scotland)	Ross Nelson	Stirling Albion		
31 May 2025	MF	(Scotland)	Ross Callachan	Arbroath	27 June 2025	
31 May 2025	FW	(Scotland)	Mark Ferrie	Cowdenbeath	6 November 2025	
31 May 2025	FW	(Scotland)	Zack Tomany	Cowdenbeath	15 July 2025	

== Friendlies ==
28 June 2024	Twente	2–2	Motherwell	Deurningen, Netherlands
19:00 BST (UTC+1)	Miller 26'; Ebiye 78'	Report	Rots 47', 77'	Stadium: Sporthal Hoge Vonder

30 June 2024	DSVD Deurningen	0–8	Motherwell	Deurningen, Netherlands
14:00 BST (UTC+1)		Report	Ebiye; Robinson; Stuparević; Nicholson

6 July 2024	Motherwell	2–1	Livingston	Motherwell
15:00 BST (UTC+1)	Blaney 29'; Ebiye 39'	Report	Yengi 60'	Stadium: Fir Park

9 July 2024	Linlithgow Rose	2–4	Motherwell	Linlithgow
19:45 BST (UTC+1)	Sneddon 75'; McGiff 85'	Report	Miller 20'; Ebiye 76', 86'; Paton 90+3'	Stadium: Prestonfield

== Competitions ==
=== Overview ===
Competition	First match	Last match	Starting round	Final position	Record							
Competition	First match	Last match	Starting round	Final position	Pld	W	D	L	GF	GA	GD	Win %
Premiership	3 August 2024	18 May 2025	Matchday 1	8th	38	14	7	17	46	63	−17	36.84
Scottish Cup	18 January 2025	18 January 2025	Fourth round	Fourth round	1	0	0	1	0	1	−1	0.00
League Cup	13 July 2024	3 November 2024	Group Stage	Semi-Final	7	4	2	1	11	5	+6	57.14
Total					46	18	9	19	57	69	−12	39.13

Last updated: 18 May 2025
Source: Soccerway

=== Premiership ===
==== League table ====
Pos	Team	Pld	W	D	L	GF	GA	GD	Pts	Qualification or relegation (Note: Teams play each other three times (33 matches), before the league is split into two groups (the top six and the bottom six).)
6	St Mirren	38	14	8	16	53	59	−6	50	
7	Heart of Midlothian	38	15	7	16	52	47	+5	52	
8	Motherwell	38	14	7	17	46	63	−17	49	
9	Kilmarnock	38	12	8	18	45	64	−19	44	
10	Dundee	38	11	8	19	57	77	−20	41	

Rules for classification: 1) Points; 2) Goal difference; 3) Goals scored; 4) Head-to-head points; 5) Head-to-head goal difference; 6) Play-off (only if deciding champion, UEFA competitions qualification, second stage group allocation or relegation).

==== Results summary ====
Overall								Home						Away					
Pld	W	D	L	GF	GA	GD	Pts	W	D	L	GF	GA	GD	W	D	L	GF	GA	GD
38	14	7	17	46	63	−17	49	8	5	5	27	27	0	6	2	12	19	36	−17

Last updated: 18 May 2025.
Source: SPFL

==== Results ====
3 August 2024 1	Motherwell	0–0	Ross County	Motherwell
15:00 BST (UTC+1)		Report	Nightingale (yellow card) 71'; White (yellow card) 84'	Stadium: Fir Park; Attendance: 4,353; Referee: John Beaton

10 August 2024 2	Rangers	2–1	Motherwell	Glasgow
15:00 BST (UTC+1)	Dessers 13'; Černý 24'; Pröpper (yellow card) 53'; Yılmaz (yellow card) 89'	Report	Pröpper 17' (o.g.)	Stadium: Hampden Park; Attendance: 48,529; Referee: Kevin Clancy
Note: Match played at Hampden Park instead of Rangers regular home, Ibrox Stadium, due to renovation work.

25 August 2024 3	Motherwell	3–1	Heart of Midlothian	Motherwell
15:00 BST (UTC+1)	McGinn 24'; Halliday (yellow card) 42'; O'Donnell 59'; Sparrow 81'	Report	Kent (yellow card) 45+1'; Devlin (yellow card) 58'; Salazar (yellow card) 62'; Oda 65'; Kingsley (yellow card) 76'	Stadium: Fir Park; Attendance: 6,895; Referee: John Beaton

31 August 2024 4	St Johnstone	1–2	Motherwell	Perth
15:00 BST (UTC+1)	MacPherson (yellow card) 51'; Kimpioka 64'; Sanders (red card) 67'	Report	Casey 11'; Ebiye 90+4'	Stadium: McDiarmid Park; Attendance: 3,629; Referee: Iain Shedden

14 September 2024 5	Aberdeen	2–1	Motherwell	Aberdeen
15:00 BST (UTC+1)	Nilsen (yellow card) 23'; Guèye 27', 80' (yellow card) 71'; Rubežić (yellow card) 64'; Besuijen (yellow card) 90+3'	Report	Zdravkovski (yellow card) 23'; O'Donnell (yellow card) 23'; Robinson (yellow card) 52'; Vale (yellow card) 67'; McGinn (yellow card) 85'; Ebiye 88'	Stadium: Pittodrie Stadium; Attendance: 17,155; Referee: Chris Graham

28 September 2024 6	Motherwell	2–1	St Mirren	Motherwell
15:00 BST (UTC+1)	Miller 19' (pen.), 44'; O'Donnell (yellow card) 45+5'; Casey (red card) 47'; Halliday (yellow card) 48'; Balmer (yellow card) 51'; Watt (yellow card) 90+4'	Report	Phillips 9'; Fraser (yellow card) 17'; Olusanya (yellow card) 36'; Tanser (yellow card) 43' (yellow-red card) 61'; O'Hara (penalty missed) 50'	Stadium: Fir Park; Attendance: 5,214; Referee: Lloyd Wilson

5 October 2024 7	Hibernian	1–2	Motherwell	Edinburgh
15:00 BST (UTC+1)	Triantis (yellow card) 16' (yellow-red card) 77'; Ekpiteta (yellow card) 47'; Campbell (yellow card) 56'; Hoilett 59'; Kwon (yellow card) 90+4'	Report	Zdravkovski (yellow card) 22'; Wilson (yellow card) 31'; Stamatelopoulos 56'; Halliday 80'; Sparrow (yellow card) 83'	Stadium: Easter Road; Referee: Matthew MacDermid

19 October 2024 8	Motherwell	0–1	Dundee	Motherwell
15:00 BST (UTC+1)		Report	Cameron 38'; Astley (yellow card) 71'; Portales (yellow card) 78'	Stadium: Fir Park; Attendance: 5,084; Referee: Euan Anderson

27 October 2024 9	Motherwell	0–3	Celtic	Motherwell
15:00 GMT (UTC)	O'Donnell (yellow card) 59'; Gordon (red card) 90+3'	Report	McCowan 27'; Bernardo (yellow card) 50'; Johnston 56' (yellow card) 90+5'; Idah 88'	Stadium: Fir Park; Attendance: 8,692; Referee: David Dickinson

30 October 2024 10	Dundee United	1–2	Motherwell	Dundee
19:45 GMT (UTC)	Stephenson (yellow card) 20'; Dalby 36'; Adegboyega (yellow card) 61'; Ferry (yellow card) 80'	Report	Maswanhise 23', 74'; Wilson (yellow card) 40'; Blaney (yellow card) 45+3'; Stamatelopoulos (yellow card) 52'; Kaleta (yellow card) 85'	Stadium: Tannadice Park; Attendance: 8,415; Referee: Lloyd Wilson

9 November 2024 12	Motherwell	2–1	St Johnstone	Motherwell
15:00 GMT (UTC)	Maswanhise 20'; Sparrow 34'; Balmer (yellow card) 80'	Report	Clark 58' (pen.)	Stadium: Fir Park; Attendance: 4,306; Referee: Ross Hardie

23 November 2024 13	Ross County	2–1	Motherwell	Dingwall
15:00 GMT (UTC)	Hale 47'; Nisbet 54'; Randall (yellow card) 90+2'	Report	Miller (yellow card) 59'; Robinson 83'	Stadium: Victoria Park; Attendance: 3,410; Referee: Chris Graham

30 November 2024 14	Motherwell	0–3	Hibernian	Motherwell
15:00 GMT (UTC)		Report	Hoilett 26'; Kukharevych 38'; Cadden (yellow card) 77'; Campbell 81'	Stadium: Fir Park; Attendance: 5,212; Referee: Grant Irvine

4 December 2024 15	Dundee	4–1	Motherwell	Dundee
19:45 GMT (UTC)	Adewumi 14'; Koumetio (yellow card) 29'; Tiffoney 60'; Cameron 63', 67'; McGhee (yellow card) 79'	Report	Stamatelopoulos 19'; Seddon (yellow card) 61'; Miller (yellow card) 78'	Stadium: Dens Park; Attendance: 5,381; Referee: John Beaton

7 December 2024 16	St Mirren	0–1	Motherwell	Paisley
15:00 GMT (UTC)	Taylor (yellow card) 34'; Gogić (yellow card) 42' (yellow-red card) 90+3'; Kiltie (yellow card) 58'; Olusanya (yellow card) 62'	Report	Blaney (yellow card) 32'; Seddon (yellow card) 69'; Stamatelopoulos (yellow card) 77'; Watt 90+4'	Stadium: St Mirren Park; Attendance: 6,111; Referee: Dan McFarlane

14 December 2024 17	Motherwell	4–3	Dundee United	Motherwell
15:00 GMT (UTC)	Stamatelopoulos 1', 40' (yellow card) 75'; Halliday 33'; Gordon (yellow card) 45'; Sparrow 67'	Report	Babunski (yellow card) 3'; Dalby 7' (pen.), 54'; Ševelj (yellow card) 45'; Gallagher (yellow card) 48'; Moult 87'	Stadium: Fir Park; Attendance: 4,473; Referee: Nick Walsh

20 December 2024 18	Motherwell	1–1	Kilmarnock	Motherwell
19:45 GMT (UTC)	Gordon 17'; Paton (yellow card) 56'; Casey (red card) 77'	Report	Watson (yellow card) 45'; Polworth 74'; Armstrong (yellow card) 78'; Wright (yellow card) 85'; Magennis (yellow card) 90+3'	Stadium: Fir Park; Attendance: 4,966; Referee: Chris Graham

26 December 2024 19	Celtic	4–0	Motherwell	Glasgow
15:00 GMT (UTC)	Engels 45+1' (pen.); Idah (yellow card) 45+4'; Maeda 57'; Kühn 74'; Hatate 81'	Report	Maswanhise (yellow card) 11'; Watt (yellow card) 41'; Casey (yellow card) 42'; Sparrow (yellow card) 45+5'; Paton (yellow card) 71'	Stadium: Celtic Park; Attendance: 58,687; Referee: Ross Hardie

29 December 2024 20	Motherwell	2–2	Rangers	Motherwell
15:00 GMT (UTC)	Stamatelopoulos 16'; Maswanhise 35'; Miller (yellow card) 53'; Sparrow (yellow card) 90'; Watt (yellow card) 90+9'; Nicholson (yellow card) 90+12'	Report	Pröpper (yellow card) 14'; Igamane 50', 68'; Sterling (yellow card) 87'; Černý (yellow card) 90+9'	Stadium: Fir Park; Attendance: 8,728; Referee: Kevin Clancy

2 January 2025 21	Heart of Midlothian	1–0	Motherwell	Edinburgh
15:00 GMT (UTC)	Drammeh 7'; Ad.Forrester (yellow card) 66'; Devlin (yellow card) 67'; Grant (yellow card) 83'	Report	Casey (yellow card) 65'	Stadium: Tynecastle Park; Attendance: 18,715; Referee: Calum Scott

5 January 2025 22	Motherwell	2–0	Aberdeen	Motherwell
14:30 GMT (UTC)	Zdravkovski (yellow card) 8'; Maswanhise (yellow card) 15' (goal) 45'; Wilson 34'	Report	Rubežić (red card) 43'; Palaversa (yellow card) 70'; Shinnie (yellow card) 85'	Stadium: Fir Park; Attendance: 5,308; Referee: Nick Walsh

8 January 2025 11	Kilmarnock	0–0	Motherwell	Kilmarnock
19:45 GMT (UTC)	Watkins (yellow card) 42'	Report	Halliday (yellow card) 38'; Wilson (yellow card) 71'	Stadium: Rugby Park; Attendance: 4,601; Referee: Don Robertson

11 January 2025 23	Hibernian	3–1	Motherwell	Edinburgh
15:00 GMT (UTC)	Boyle 27', 81' (pen.); Triantis 30'; Iredale (yellow card) 75'	Report	Blaney (yellow card) 42'; Casey (yellow card) 45+3'; Slattery 76'; O'Donnell (yellow card) 80'; Vale (red card) 90+3'	Stadium: Easter Road; Attendance: 15,829; Referee: Colin Steven

25 January 2025 24	St Johnstone	2–1	Motherwell	Perth
15:00 GMT (UTC)	Kucheriavyi (yellow card) 22'; Steven 86'; Mikulić 88'	Report	Halliday 4' (pen.); Sparrow (yellow card) 47'; Thompson (yellow card) 61'; Paton (yellow card) 70'; Armstrong (yellow card) 90+1'	Stadium: McDiarmid Park; Attendance: 3,892; Referee: Kevin Clancy

2 February 2025 25	Motherwell	1–3	Celtic	Motherwell
15:00 GMT (UTC)	Armstrong 23'	Report	Maeda 1'; Idah 29'; Jota 90+4'	Stadium: Fir Park; Attendance: 8,293; Referee: Calum Scott

15 February 2025 26	Motherwell	0–3	Ross County	Motherwell
15:00 GMT (UTC)	Balmer (yellow card) 68'	Report	Hale 32', 59'; Chilvers (yellow card) 77'; Tomkinson (yellow card) 83'; Ashworth (yellow card) 88'; Randall 89'	Stadium: Fir Park; Attendance: 3,973; Referee: Iain Snedden

22 February 2025 27	Dundee United	1–0	Motherwell	Dundee
15:00 GMT (UTC)	Dalby 31'	Report	Gordon (yellow card) 43'; Slattery (yellow card) 71'	Stadium: Tannadice Park; Attendance: 9,044; Referee: Chris Graham

26 February 2025 28	Motherwell	2–1	Dundee	Motherwell
19:45 GMT (UTC)	Casey 12', 84'; Halliday (yellow card) 37'	Report	Murray 79'	Stadium: Fir Park; Attendance: 4,258; Referee: Lloyd Wilson

1 March 2025 29	Rangers	1–2	Motherwell	Glasgow
15:00 GMT (UTC)	Jefté (yellow card) 49'; Dessers 54'; Bajrami (yellow card) 90+3'	Report	Armstrong 9'; Sparrow 30', (yellow card) 90+2'; Halliday (yellow card) 45+6'	Stadium: Ibrox Stadium; Attendance: 50,056; Referee: Nick Walsh

15 March 2025 30	Motherwell	2–2	St Mirren	Motherwell
15:00 GMT (UTC)	Slattery 35', 71'; Gordon (yellow card) 61'; Halliday (yellow card) 90+6'; Casey (yellow card) 90+10'	Report	Boyd-Munce 23'; Fraser (yellow card) 32'; Phillips (yellow card) 33'; Olusanya (yellow card) 61' (yellow-red card) 84'; Iacovitti (yellow card) 62'; Smyth (yellow card) 80'	Stadium: Fir Park; Attendance: 6,121; Referee: Grant Irvine

29 March 2025 31	Aberdeen	4–1	Motherwell	Aberdeen
15:00 GMT (UTC)	Dorrington 13'; Guèye (yellow card) 29'; Clarkson 37'; Nisbet 77', 90+2'	Report	Slattery 5' (yellow card) 68'; Maswanhise (yellow card) 81'	Stadium: Pittodrie Stadium; Attendance: 19,274; Referee: Ross Hardie

5 April 2025 32	Kilmarnock	2–0	Motherwell	Kilmarnock
15:00 BST (UTC+1)	Lyons (yellow card) 16'; Murray 22'; Wright 53'; Wales (yellow card) 81'	Report	O'Donnell (yellow card) 12'; Balmer (red card) 26'; Thompson (yellow card) 63'; Slattery (yellow card) 71'	Stadium: Rugby Park; Attendance: 5,671; Referee: Matthew MacDermid

12 April 2025 33	Motherwell	0–0	Heart of Midlothian	Motherwell
15:00 BST (UTC+1)		Report	Kartum (yellow card) 23'; Forrester (yellow card) 35'; Baningime (yellow card) 66'	Stadium: Fir Park; Attendance: 7,481; Referee: Kevin Clancy

26 April 2025 34	Motherwell	3–2	St Johnstone	Motherwell
15:00 BST (UTC+1)	Slattery 39' (yellow card) 65'; Sprangler 40' (o.g.); Sparrow 48' (yellow card) 89'; O'Donnell (yellow card) 66'; Halliday (yellow card) 68'	Report	Kirk 6'; E.Watt 66'; Ikpeazu (yellow card) 84'	Stadium: Fir Park; Attendance: 4,412; Referee: Steven McLean

3 May 2025 35	Dundee	1–2	Motherwell	Dundee
15:00 BST (UTC+1)	Portales 31'; Shaughnessy (yellow card) 37'	Report	Sparrow 59'; Koutroumbis (red card) 80'; Maswanhise 90+1' (yellow card) 90+1'; Miller (yellow card) 90+4'	Stadium: Dens Park; Attendance: 5,692; Referee: Kevin Clancy

10 May 2025 36	Heart of Midlothian	3–0	Motherwell	Edinburgh
15:00 BST (UTC+1)	Shankland 30', 60'; Devlin (yellow card) 48'; Forrest 62'; Halkett (yellow card) 80'	Report	Halliday (yellow card) 45+1'; Miller (yellow card) 54'	Stadium: Tynecastle Park; Attendance: 18,496; Referee: Ryan Lee

14 May 2025 37	Motherwell	3–0	Kilmarnock	Motherwell
19:45 BST (UTC+1)	Armstrong 77', 86'; Slattery 83'	Report	Deas (red card) 29'; Watson (yellow card) 80'	Stadium: Fir Park; Attendance: 4,941; Referee: Duncan Nicolson

18 May 2025 38	Ross County	1–1	Motherwell	Dingwall
15:00 BST (UTC+1)	Kenneh (yellow card) 15'; Hale 29'; Randall (yellow card) 53'	Report	Ebiye 83'; O'Donnell (yellow card) 90+5'	Stadium: Victoria Park; Attendance: 4,170; Referee: Don Robertson

=== Scottish Cup ===
18 January 2025 Fourth round	St Johnstone	1–0	Motherwell	Perth
15:00 GMT (UTC)	Kirk 9'; Griffith (yellow card) 57'; Kimpioka (yellow card) 90+3'	Report	Blaney (yellow card) 52'; Sparrow (yellow card) 62'	Stadium: McDiarmid Park; Attendance: 3,892; Referee: John Beaton

=== League Cup ===
==== Group stage ====
Pos	Team	Pld	W	PW	PL	L	GF	GA	GD	Pts	Qualification	MOT	PAR	MON	CLY	EDI
1	Motherwell	4	2	1	1	0	7	2	+5	9	Qualification for the second round	—	0–0p	—	—	3–0
2	Partick Thistle	4	2	1	0	1	11	5	+6	8		—	—	3–2	2–3	—
3	Montrose	4	2	0	1	1	6	5	+1	7		1–1p	—	—	—	2–1
4	Clyde	4	2	0	0	2	9	6	+3	6		1–3	—	0–1	—	—
5	Edinburgh City	4	0	0	0	4	1	16	−15	0		—	0–6	—	0–5	—

Rules for classification: 1) goal difference, 2) goals scored, 3) away goals scored, 4) matches won, 5) away matches won, 6) drawing of lots.

13 July 2024 1	Motherwell	3–0	Edinburgh City	Motherwell
15:00 BST (UTC+1)	Balmer 43'; Casey 56'; O'Donnell 61'		Jones (yellow card) 42'; Lynch (yellow card) 89'	Stadium: Fir Park; Attendance: 2,587; Referee: Calum Scott

16 July 2024 2	Montrose	1–1 (4–5 p)	Motherwell	Montrose
19:45 BST (UTC+1)	Shrive 86'		Blaney 31'; Paton (yellow card) 78'	Stadium: Links Park; Attendance: 1,036; Referee: Colin Steven
	Penalties
	Gardyne (penalty scored); Shrive (penalty scored); Machado (penalty missed); Maciver-Redwood (penalty scored); Brown (penalty scored)		Stuparević (penalty scored); Blaney (penalty scored); Miller (penalty scored); O'Donnell (penalty scored); Ebiye (penalty scored)

20 July 2024 3	Clyde	1–3	Motherwell	Hamilton
15:00 BST (UTC+1)	Houston (yellow card) 19'; Hamilton 62'; Scullion (yellow card) 79'		Gordon (yellow card) 7'; Ebiye 12'; Zdravkovski (yellow card) 45+2'; Miller 65' (pen.); Stuparević 86'	Stadium: New Douglas Park; Attendance: 1,948; Referee: https://spfl.co.uk/league/league-cup/results/2441571

28 July 2024 4	Motherwell	0–0 (1–3 p)	Partick Thistle	Motherwell
15:00 BST (UTC+1)	Blaney (yellow card) 48'		Williams (yellow card) 51'	Stadium: Fir Park; Attendance: 5,695; Referee: David Dickinson
	Penalties
	Seddon (penalty missed); O'Donnell (penalty missed); Ebiye (penalty scored); Wells (penalty missed)		(penalty missed) Muirhead; (penalty scored) Turner; (penalty scored) Graham; (penalty missed) Stanway; (penalty scored) McBeth

==== Knockout phase ====
18 August 2024 Second round	Motherwell	1–0 (a.e.t.)	Kilmarnock	Motherwell
14:00 BST (UTC+1)	Casey (yellow card) 48'; Ebiye 96'; Sparrow (yellow card) 105'		Findlay (yellow card) 44' (yellow-red card) 51'; Lyons (yellow card) 87'; O'Hara (yellow card) 90+5'; Watson (yellow card) 95'; Deas (yellow card) 110'	Stadium: Fir Park; Attendance: 4,371; Referee: Nick Walsh

20 September 2024 Quarter-Final	Motherwell	2–1	Dundee United	Motherwell
19:45 BST (UTC+1)	Robinson 45'; McGinn (yellow card) 61'; Zdravkovski (yellow card) 90'; Miller 90+1' (pen.)	Report	Sibbald (yellow card) 45+3'; Adegboyega (yellow card) 54'; Moult 83'; Gallagher (yellow card) 85'; Ubochioma (yellow card) 87'; Docherty (yellow card) 90+1'	Stadium: Fir Park; Attendance: 8,327; Referee: John Beaton

3 November 2024 Semi-Final	Motherwell	1–2	Rangers	Glasgow
15:00 GMT (UTC)	Halliday 25'; Balmer (yellow card) 39'; Seddon (yellow card) 52'	Report	Bajrami (yellow card) 41' (goal) 81'; Dessers 49'; Diomande (yellow card) 89'; Černý (yellow card) 90+5'	Stadium: Hampden Park; Attendance: 37,077; Referee: Nick Walsh

== Squad statistics ==
=== Appearances ===
As of match played 18 May 2025

No.	Pos	Nat	Player	Total		Premiership		Scottish Cup		League Cup	
No.	Pos	Nat	Player	Apps	Goals	Apps	Goals	Apps	Goals	Apps	Goals
1	GK	(Scotland) SCO	Archie Mair	2	0	1	0	1	0	0	0
2	DF	(Scotland) SCO	Stephen O'Donnell	36	2	26+3	1	0+1	0	6	1
3	DF	(England) ENG	Steve Seddon	17	0	11+3	0	0	0	2+1	0
4	DF	(Scotland) SCO	Liam Gordon	33	1	27	1	0	0	6	0
5	DF	(Northern Ireland) NIR	Kofi Balmer	24	1	16+4	0	1	0	2+1	1
6	MF	(North Macedonia) MKD	Davor Zdravkovski	31	0	13+12	0	0	0	6	0
7	MF	(Wales) WAL	Tom Sparrow	37	6	21+11	6	0+1	0	0+4	0
8	MF	(England) ENG	Callum Slattery	16	6	12+3	6	0+1	0	0	0
9	FW	(England) ENG	Zach Robinson	19	2	7+5	1	0	0	5+2	1
11	MF	(Scotland) SCO	Andy Halliday	46	4	35+3	3	1	0	6+1	1
12	MF	(Canada) CAN	Harry Paton	24	0	11+10	0	0	0	3	0
13	GK	(England) ENG	Aston Oxborough	30	0	25	0	0	0	5	0
14	FW	(Australia) AUS	Apostolos Stamatelopoulos	18	5	13+3	5	0	0	1+1	0
15	DF	(Republic of Ireland) IRL	Dan Casey	41	4	31+2	3	1	0	7	1
16	DF	(Scotland) SCO	Paul McGinn	12	1	7+3	1	0	0	2	0
18	MF	(Scotland) SCO	Ross Callachan	1	0	0+1	0	0	0	0	0
19	FW	(Scotland) SCO	Sam Nicholson	10	0	2+7	0	1	0	0	0
20	DF	(Republic of Ireland) IRL	Shane Blaney	17	1	10+1	0	1	0	4+1	1
21	DF	(Democratic Republic of the Congo) COD	Marvin Kaleta	26	0	13+8	0	1	0	1+3	0
22	DF	(Australia) AUS	John Koutroumbis	8	0	4+4	0	0	0	0	0
23	DF	(Scotland) SCO	Ewan Wilson	39	1	24+7	1	1	0	7	0
24	FW	(Nigeria) NGR	Moses Ebiye	34	5	3+24	3	0+1	0	2+4	2
27	MF	(Scotland) SCO	Dylan Wells	4	0	0+1	0	0	0	1+2	0
29	FW	(Scotland) SCO	Mark Ferrie	2	0	0	0	0	0	0+2	0
30	DF	(Scotland) SCO	Brannan McDermott	1	0	0	0	0	0	0+1	0
38	MF	(Scotland) SCO	Lennon Miller	39	4	32	2	0	0	6+1	2
52	FW	(Scotland) SCO	Tony Watt	30	1	15+13	1	0+1	0	0+1	0
54	MF	(Wales) WAL	Kai Andrews	12	0	5+6	0	1	0	0	0
55	FW	(Zimbabwe) ZIM	Tawanda Maswanhise	34	6	17+13	6	1	0	2+1	0
56	DF	(England) ENG	Dominic Thompson	15	0	11+4	0	0	0	0	0
57	FW	(England) ENG	Luke Plange	4	0	1+3	0	0	0	0	0
58	FW	(England) ENG	Will Dickson	7	0	1+6	0	0	0	0	0
59	FW	(England) ENG	Luke Armstrong	14	4	8+6	4	0	0	0	0
77	FW	(Wales) WAL	Jack Vale	7	0	2+4	0	1	0	0	0
88	GK	(England) ENG	Ellery Balcombe	12	0	12	0	0	0	0	0
90	FW	(Portugal) POR	Jair Tavares	10	0	2+7	0	0	0	0+1	0
Players away from the club on loan:
17	FW	(Serbia) SRB	Filip Stuparević	4	1	0	0	0	0	1+3	1
Players who left Motherwell during the season:
1	GK	(Hungary) HUN	Krisztián Hegyi	2	0	0	0	0	0	2	0

=== Goal scorers ===
As of match played 18 May 2025

Ranking	Nation	Position	Number	Name	Scottish Premiership	Scottish Cup	League Cup	Total
1	MF	(Wales)	7	Tom Sparrow	6	0	0	6
1	FW	(Zimbabwe)	55	Tawanda Maswanhise	6	0	0	6
1	MF	(England)	8	Callum Slattery	6	0	0	6
4	FW	(Australia)	14	Apostolos Stamatelopoulos	5	0	0	5
4	FW	(Nigeria)	24	Moses Ebiye	3	0	2	5
6	FW	(England)	59	Luke Armstrong	4	0	0	4
6	MF	(Scotland)	11	Andy Halliday	3	0	1	4
6	DF	(Republic of Ireland)	15	Dan Casey	3	0	1	4
6	MF	(Scotland)	38	Lennon Miller	2	0	2	4
10	DF	(Scotland)	2	Stephen O'Donnell	1	0	1	2
10	FW	(England)	9	Zach Robinson	1	0	1	2
10				Own goal	2	0	0	2
13	DF	(Scotland)	16	Paul McGinn	1	0	0	1
13	FW	(Scotland)	52	Tony Watt	1	0	0	1
13	DF	(Scotland)	4	Liam Gordon	1	0	0	1
13	DF	(Scotland)	23	Ewan Wilson	1	0	0	1
13	DF	(Northern Ireland)	5	Kofi Balmer	0	0	1	1
13	DF	(Republic of Ireland)	20	Shane Blaney	0	0	1	1
13	FW	(Serbia)	17	Filip Stuparević	0	0	1	1
TOTALS					46	0	11	57

=== Clean sheets ===
As of match played 18 May 2025

Ranking	Nation	Position	Number	Name	Scottish Premiership	Scottish Cup	League Cup	Total
1	GK	(England)	13	Aston Oxborough	5	0	2	7
2	GK	(England)	88	Ellery Balcombe	1	0	0	1
2	GK	(Hungary)	1	Krisztián Hegyi	0	0	1	1
TOTALS					6	0	3	9

=== Disciplinary record ===
As of match played 18 May 2025

Number	Nation	Position	Name	Premiership		Scottish Cup		League Cup		Total	
Number	Nation	Position	Name	Yellow card	Red card	Yellow card	Red card	Yellow card	Red card	Yellow card	Red card
2	(Scotland)	DF	Stephen O'Donnell	7	0	0	0	0	0	7	0
3	(England)	DF	Steve Seddon	2	0	0	0	1	0	3	0
4	(Scotland)	DF	Liam Gordon	3	1	0	0	1	0	4	1
5	(Northern Ireland)	DF	Kofi Balmer	3	1	0	0	1	0	4	1
6	(North Macedonia)	MF	Davor Zdravkovski	3	0	0	0	2	0	5	0
7	(Wales)	MF	Tom Sparrow	6	0	1	0	1	0	8	0
8	(England)	MF	Callum Slattery	4	0	0	0	0	0	4	0
9	(England)	FW	Zach Robinson	1	0	0	0	0	0	1	0
11	(Scotland)	MF	Andy Halliday	8	0	0	0	0	0	8	0
12	(Canada)	MF	Harry Paton	3	0	0	0	1	0	4	0
14	(Australia)	FW	Apostolos Stamatelopoulos	3	0	0	0	0	0	3	0
15	(Republic of Ireland)	DF	Dan Casey	4	2	0	0	1	0	5	2
16	(Scotland)	DF	Paul McGinn	1	0	0	0	1	0	2	0
19	(Scotland)	FW	Sam Nicholson	1	0	0	0	0	0	1	0
20	(Republic of Ireland)	DF	Shane Blaney	3	0	1	0	1	0	5	0
21	(Democratic Republic of the Congo)	DF	Marvin Kaleta	1	0	0	0	0	0	1	0
22	(Australia)	DF	John Koutroumbis	0	1	0	0	0	0	0	1
23	(Scotland)	DF	Ewan Wilson	3	0	0	0	0	0	3	0
38	(Scotland)	MF	Lennon Miller	5	0	0	0	0	0	5	0
52	(Scotland)	FW	Tony Watt	3	0	0	0	0	0	3	0
55	(Zimbabwe)	FW	Tawanda Maswanhise	4	0	0	0	0	0	4	0
56	(England)	DF	Dominic Thompson	2	0	0	0	0	0	2	0
59	(England)	FW	Luke Armstrong	1	0	0	0	0	0	1	0
77	(Wales)	FW	Jack Vale	1	1	0	0	0	0	1	1
Players away from the club on loan::
Players who left Motherwell during the season:
			TOTALS	72	6	2	0	10	0	84	6

== See also ==
- List of Motherwell F.C. seasons
