= Dylan Wells (footballer) =

Scottish footballer

Personal information
- Date of birth: 20 March 2006 (age 20)
- Place of birth: Coatbridge, Scotland
- Height: 1.70 m (5 ft 7 in)
- Position: Midfielder

Team information
- Current team: Linfield
- Number: 16

Youth career
- –2022: Motherwell

Senior career*
Years	Team	Apps	(Gls)
2022–2026	Motherwell	2	(0)
2024–2025	→ Edinburgh City (loan)	16	(1)
2026	→ Stirling Albion (loan)	10	(1)
2026–	Linfield	3	(0)
- * Club domestic league appearances and goals as of 1 September 2026

Dylan Wells (born 20 March 2006) is a Scottish footballer who plays as a midfielder for Linfield in the NIFL Premiership.

== Career ==
On 24 June 2022, Wells signed his first professional contract with Motherwell having graduated from their academy. On 12 April 2024, Motherwell announced that they had extended their Wells until the summer of 2026.

On 30 September 2024, Wells was loaned to Scottish League Two club Edinburgh City.

On 15 January 2026, Wells joined Scottish League Two club Stirling Albion on loan for the remainder of the season.

On 20 May 2026, Motherwell confirmed that Wells would leave he club when his contract expired on 31 May 2026.

On 15 June 2026, NIFL Premiership club Linfield announced the singing of Wells to a one-year contract.

== Career statistics ==
As of match played on 29 August 2026

Appearances and goals by club, season and competition
Club	Season	League			National Cup (Note: Includes Scottish Cup, Irish Cup)		League Cup (Note: Includes Scottish League Cup, NI League Cup)		Continental		Other		Total	
Club	Season	Division	Apps	Goals	Apps	Goals	Apps	Goals	Apps	Goals	Apps	Goals	Apps	Goals
Motherwell	2022–23	Scottish Premiership	0	0	0	0	0	0	0	0	—		0	0
Motherwell	2023–24	Scottish Premiership	1	0	1	0	0	0	—				2	0
Motherwell	2024–25	Scottish Premiership	1	0	0	0	3	0	—				4	0
Motherwell	2025–26	Scottish Premiership	0	0	0	0	0	0	—				0	0
Motherwell	Total		2	0	0	0	4	0	—				6	0
Edinburgh City (loan)	2024–25	Scottish League Two	16	1	1	0	0	0	0	0	—		17	1
Stirling Albion (loan)	2025–26	Scottish League Two	10	1	0	0	0	0	0	0	—		10	1
Linfield	2026–27	NIFL Premiership	3	0	0	0	0	0	2 (Note: Appearances in the UEFA Conference League)	0	—		5	0
Career total			31	2	1	0	4	0	2	0	—		38	2
