= Josh Williams (English footballer) =

English footballer (born 2002)

Personal information
- Full name: Joshua Aaron Williams
- Date of birth: 24 November 2002 (age 23)
- Place of birth: Wolverhampton, England
- Height: 1.82 m (6 ft 0 in)
- Positions: Full back; winger

Team information
- Current team: Carlisle United
- Number: 22

Youth career
- 2011–2022: Birmingham City

Senior career*
Years	Team	Apps	(Gls)
2022–2025	Birmingham City	7	(0)
2023–2024	→ Cheltenham Town (loan)	5	(0)
2024–2025	→ Gateshead (loan)	10	(0)
2025–	Carlisle United	44	(2)
- * Club domestic league appearances and goals as of 18:10, 4 November 2026 (UTC)

Joshua Aaron Williams (born 24 November 2002) is an English professional footballer who plays as a full back or winger for National League club Carlisle United. He began his football career with Birmingham City, and spent time on loan at League One team Cheltenham Town in 2023 and National League club Gateshead in 2024–25, before joining Carlisle United in January 2025.

== Life and career ==
Williams attended Our Lady and St Chad Catholic Academy in Wolverhampton. He joined Birmingham City's Academy in 2011 as an eight-year-old, and took up a two-year scholarship with the club in July 2019. According to the then academy manager Kristjaan Speakman, Williams "is a powerful and athletic player who is able to play in a range of positions. In central and wide positions he's able to run with and without the ball into dangerous spaces and in higher areas of the pitch regardless of his position, has demonstrated an eye for goal."

Williams played for Birmingham's U23 team as they beat Sheffield United U23 in the national final of that season's Professional Development League. Nominally at right back, he had so little defensive work to do in the first half that the Birmingham Mail's ratings described him as "basically ... an auxiliary winger". He was one of five under-18s offered their first professional contract in 2021, and one of four who accepted. Ahead of the 2021–22 season he played in two first-team pre-season friendlies.

Williams made his senior debut as a substitute in Birmingham's 2021–22 FA Cup third-round match at home to League One club Plymouth Argyle, replacing Maxime Colin halfway through extra time when Birmingham were losing 1–0 and reduced to ten men. His next appearance was also his first senior start, in the first round of the 2022–23 EFL Cup away to Norwich City, which Birmingham lost on penalties. The Birmingham Mail marked him 8 out of 10 in a good overall debut. Four days later, Williams made his Football League debut, replacing the injured Marc Roberts after 55 minutes of the 1–0 defeat. He started in six of the next seven Championship matches, and according to head coach John Eustace, was "very good playing left wing back, right wing back, anywhere we have asked him to play. For a 19-year-old to be doing that in his first season, he has been fantastic and he hasn't let anyone down." He lost his place initially to loanee Manny Longelo, and dropped down the pecking order after the return to fitness of senior defenders, changes of shape, and a hamstring injury.

In July 2023, Williams signed a three-year contract extension. Injuries to full backs including Williams himself meant plans to send him out on loan were put on hold, but the arrival of Cody Drameh freed him up, and on 1 September he joined League One club Cheltenham Town on loan until January 2024. He made nine appearances, of which just five in league competition, before returning to his parent club.

His next appearance for his parent club was not until October 2024 in the EFL Trophy, and he joined National League club Gateshead on 12 November on loan until the end of January 2025. He made 13 appearances in all competitions, 10 in the league, before being recalled by Birmingham on 21 January 2025.

Later that day, Williams signed a two-and-a-half-year contract with League Two club Carlisle United; the fee was undisclosed. On 31 August 2026, Josh Williams scored his first senior career goal for Carlisle United during a 4-2 victory over Scunthorpe United. Williams scored his second career goal on 28 October 2026, netting the opening strike in a 3–0 victory for Carlisle United against Harrogate Town, a match Carlisle won with only nine players.

== Career statistics ==
As of match played 31 October 2026

Appearances and goals by club, season and competition
Club	Season	League			FA Cup		EFL Cup		Other		Total	
Club	Season	Division	Apps	Goals	Apps	Goals	Apps	Goals	Apps	Goals	Apps	Goals
Birmingham City	2021–22	Championship	0	0	1	0	0	0	—		1	0
Birmingham City	2022–23	Championship	7	0	0	0	1	0	—		8	0
Birmingham City	2023–24	Championship	0	0	0	0	0	0	—		0	0
Birmingham City	2024–25	League One	0	0	0	0	0	0	1 (Note: Appearance(s) in EFL Trophy)	0	1	0
Birmingham City	Total		7	0	1	0	1	0	1	0	10	0
Cheltenham Town (loan)	2023–24	League One	5	0	1	0	—		3	0	9	0
Gateshead (loan)	2024–25	National League	10	0	—		—		3 (Note: Two appearances in FA Trophy, one in National League Cup)	0	13	0
Carlisle United	2024–25	League Two	6	0	—		—		—		6	0
Carlisle United	2025–26	National League	24	0	3	0	0	0	2	0	29	0
Carlisle United	2026–27	National League	14	2	1	0	0	0	0	0	15	2
Career total			66	2	6	0	1	0	9	0	81	2
