= SPFL Reserve League =

- Founded: 2018
- Country: Scotland
- Divisions: 1
- Number of clubs: 6
- Domestic cup: SPFL Reserve Cup
- Current champions: Queen's Park Reserves (2024–25)

The SPFL Reserve League is the reserve team league for football in Scotland. The league began in 2018, as the SPFL Development League was replaced by a reserve team (i.e not age-restricted) format.

== History ==
In its first season, 2018–19, the league included 27 clubs, split into two divisions. At its end, several clubs (Aberdeen, Celtic, Hibernian, Rangers and St Johnstone) intimated that they would withdraw from the Reserve League to arrange their own programme of matches. The 2019–20 edition was formed with 19 clubs, with the season being curtailed early due to the COVID-19 pandemic in Scotland; the winners were decided on a 'points per game' calculation.

After a two-year hiatus due to the pandemic, the league returned in season 2022–23 with ten clubs participating. Hibernian were the winners of a truncated competition, with only one round of matches (nine per team).

In 2023–24, Queen's Park won six of their eight Reserve League fixtures, securing the title. Their only defeat came against the previous season's champions Hibernian.

In 2024-25, six clubs participated in the SPFL Reserve League, playing each other twice across the season. Queen's Park won a second successive title with a points tally of 19; just one point ahead of runners up Livingston.

== Participating clubs ==
- (for 2024–25 - Airdrieonians, Ayr United and Hibernian withdrew)
- Dundee
- Dunfermline Athletic
- Kilmarnock
- Livingston
- Queen of the South
- Queen's Park

== Winners ==
Season	Winner	Runner-up	League 2 Winner
2018–19	Rangers Reserves	Celtic Reserves	Livingston Reserves
2019–20	Hamilton Academical Reserves	Heart of Midlothian Reserves	Livingston Reserves
2022–23	Hibernian Reserves	Motherwell Reserves	
2023–24	Queen's Park Reserves	Dundee Reserves	
2024–25	Queen's Park Reserves	Livingston Reserves	

== Reserve Cup ==
A knockout competition is organised alongside the League.

A total of 12 clubs entered the 2024/25 SPFL Reserve Cup, with the competing sides split into three groups of four on a broadly regional basis. Clubs played each other once and the winner of each group progressed to the semi finals. These were Dunfermline Athletic, Queen's Park, and Queen of the South F.C.. Kilmarnock, the best runner-up across the three groups, also qualified for the semi-finals.

The Final, between Kilmarnock and Dunfermline, took place on the 23rd of April 2025. Dunfermline won the match 2-1, securing their second successive reserve cup.

Season	Winner	Runner-up
2018–19	Heart of Midlothian Reserves	Motherwell Reserves
2019–20	not completed (Note: Finalists were Aberdeen Reserves and Celtic Reserves.)	
2022–23	Kilmarnock Reserves	Dunfermline Athletic Reserves
2023–24	Dunfermline Athletic Reserves	Livingston F.C.
2024–25	Dunfermline Athletic Reserves	Kilmarnock Reserves

== See also ==
- Scottish Premier Reserve League (a similar competition, operated by the Scottish Premier League between 1998 and 2009)
