= Luca Ross =

Scottish footballer

Personal information
- Date of birth: 11 August 2006 (age 20)
- Place of birth: Falkirk, Scotland
- Height: 1.78 m (5 ft 10 in)
- Position: Forward

Team information
- Current team: Alloa Athletic (on loan from Motherwell)
- Number: 29

Youth career
- 2014–2023: Motherwell

Senior career*
Years	Team	Apps	(Gls)
2022–	Motherwell	13	(1)
2024–2025	→ Annan Athletic (loan)	26	(3)
2026–	→ Alloa Athletic (loan)	4	(0)
- * Club domestic league appearances and goals as of 12 October 2026

Luca Ross (born 11 August 2006) is a Scottish footballer who plays as a forward for Scottish League One side Alloa Athletic, on loan from Scottish Premiership club Motherwell.

== Career ==
=== Club ===
On 24 June 2022, Motherwell announced that Ross had signed his first professional contract with the club. On 28 December 2022, Ross made his professional debut against Rangers as a substitute on the 81st minute for Blair Spittal at Ibrox. On 15 July 2023, Ross Had his first professional start against Elgin City in the Scottish league cup. On 28 October 2023, Ross scored a 94th minute equaliser to earn Motherwell a point in a 3-3 draw at home to Ross County having come on as a 87th minute substitute for Oli Shaw.

On 30 August 2024, Ross joined Annan Athletic on loan until January 2025. On 9 January 2025, Ross' loan deal with Annan Athletic was extended until the end of the season.

On 16 April 2025, Motherwell announced that they had signed a contract extension with Ross until the summer of 2027.

On 11 September 2026, Ross joined Scottish League One side Alloa Athletic on loan for the remainder for the season.

== Career statistics ==
As of match played on 10 October 2026

Appearances and goals by club, season and competition
Club	Season	League			National Cup (Note: Includes Scottish Cup)		League Cup (Note: Includes Scottish League Cup)		Continental		Other		Total	
Club	Season	Division	Apps	Goals	Apps	Goals	Apps	Goals	Apps	Goals	Apps	Goals	Apps	Goals
Motherwell	2022–23	Scottish Premiership	1	0	0	0	0	0	0	0	—		1	0
Motherwell	2023–24	Scottish Premiership	3	1	0	0	1	0	—				4	1
Motherwell	2024–25	Scottish Premiership	0	0	0	0	0	0	—				0	0
Motherwell	2025–26	Scottish Premiership	9	0	1	0	3	0	—				13	0
Motherwell	2025–26	Scottish Premiership	0	0	0	0	1	0	3 (Note: Appearances in the UEFA Conference League)	0	—		4	0
Motherwell	Total		13	1	1	0	5	0	3	0	—		22	1
Annan Athletic (loan)	2024–25	Scottish League One	23	1	1	0	0	0	—		0	0	24	1
Alloa Athletic (loan)	2026–27	Scottish League One	4	0	0	0	0	0	—				4	0
Career total			40	2	2	0	5	0	3	0	—		50	2

== See also ==
- List of Scottish football families
