= Mark Ferrie =

Scottish footballer

Personal information
- Full name: Mark Ferrie
- Date of birth: 2 December 2005 (age 20)
- Place of birth: Wishaw, Scotland
- Height: 1.79 m (5 ft 10 in)
- Position: Forward

Team information
- Current team: Cowdenbeath

Youth career
- 2014–2023: Motherwell

Senior career*
Years	Team	Apps	(Gls)
2022–	Motherwell	1	(0)
2023–2024	→ Stenhousemuir (loan)	6	(0)
2024–2025	→ Bonnyrigg Rose (loan)	28	(2)
2025–	Cowdenbeath	3	(0)
- * Club domestic league appearances and goals as of 12:14, 25 November 2025 (UTC)

Mark Ferrie (born 2 December 2005) is a Scottish footballer who plays as a forward for Cowdenbeath.

== Career ==
On 24 June 2022, Ferrie signed his professional contract with Motherwell.

On 29 September 2023, Ferrie joined Stenhousemuir on loan until January 2024.

On 24 May 2024, Ferrie extended his contract with Motherwell until the summer of 2025. On 26 September 2024, Ferrie joined Bonnyrigg Rose on loan until January 2025. On 28 May 2025, Motherwell announced that Ferrie would leave the club at the end of his contract.

On 6 November 2025, Lowland Football League club Cowdenbeath announced the signing of Ferrie on a contract until the end of January after a successful trial period.

== Career statistics ==
As of match played on 22 November 2025

Appearances and goals by club, season and competition
Club	Season	League			National Cup (Note: Includes Scottish Cup)		League Cup (Note: Includes Scottish League Cup)		Continental		Other		Total	
Club	Season	Division	Apps	Goals	Apps	Goals	Apps	Goals	Apps	Goals	Apps	Goals	Apps	Goals
Motherwell	2022–23	Scottish Premiership	0	0	0	0	0	0	0	0	—		0	0
Motherwell	2023–24	Scottish Premiership	5	0	0	0	5	0	—				10	0
Motherwell	2024–25	Scottish Premiership	0	0	0	0	2	0	—				2	0
Motherwell	Total		5	0	0	0	7	0	—				12	0
Stenhousemuir (loan)	2023–24	Scottish League Two	6	0	1	0	0	0	0	0	—		7	0
Bonnyrigg Rose (loan)	2024–25	Scottish League Two	28	2	1	0	0	0	0	0	—		29	2
Cowdenbeath	2025–26	Lowland Football League	3	0	0	0	—				0	0	3	0
Career total			42	2	2	0	7	0	—				51	2

== See also ==
- List of Scottish football families
