= Shane Blaney =

Irish professional footballer

Personal information
- Date of birth: 20 January 1999 (age 27)
- Place of birth: Letterkenny, Ireland
- Height: 1.91 m (6 ft 3 in)
- Position: Centre back

Team information
- Current team: Livingston

Youth career
- Finn Harps

Senior career*
Years	Team	Apps	(Gls)
2017	Finn Harps	3	(0)
2018–2020	Doncaster Rovers	0	(0)
2018	→ Tamworth (loan)	2	(0)
2018	→ Grantham Town (loan)	4	(0)
2020	→ Blyth Spartans (loan)	1	(0)
2021–2022	Sligo Rovers	37	(1)
2023–2025	Motherwell	43	(2)
2025–	Livingston	5	(0)
2026	→ Sligo Rovers (loan)	10	(0)
- * Club domestic league appearances and goals as of 22:20, 24 June 2026 (UTC)

Shane Blaney (born 20 January 1999) is an Irish professional footballer who plays as a defender for Scottish Championship club Livingston.

== Early and personal life ==
Blaney was born in Letterkenny.

== Career ==
=== Finn Harps ===
Blaney began his career with Finn Harps, captaining their under-17 team and also playing for their under-19 team. He made his senior debut in the 2017 season, making 3 League of Ireland appearances. He signed a new contract for the 2018 season in December 2017.

=== Doncaster Rovers ===
He turned professional in January 2018 after signing a two-and-a-half-year contract with English club Doncaster Rovers in January 2018. He moved on loan to Tamworth in July 2018 for an intended six months. He returned sooner and then moved on loan to Grantham Town in October 2018 for a month, making four appearances in all competitions. Blaney signed for Blyth Spartans on loan in February 2020. He was released by Doncaster at the end of the 2019–20 season.

=== Sligo Rovers ===
He signed for Sligo Rovers for the 2021 season.

=== Motherwell ===
In December 2022 it was announced that he would sign for Scottish club Motherwell in January 2023.

=== Livingston ===
On 13 June 2025, Blaney joined Scottish Premiership club Livingston. On 18 October 2025, Blaney suffered a hamstring injury that would keep him out of action for at least a three-month spell.

==== Sligo Rovers loan ====
On 19 January 2026, Blaney returned to his former club Sligo Rovers on loan until 30 June 2026.

== International career ==
Blaney represented Ireland at schoolboy level, captaining the side.

== Career statistics ==
As of match played on 29 May 2026

Appearances and goals by club, season and competition
Club	Season	League			National Cup (Note: Includes FAI Cup & FA Cup)		League Cup (Note: Includes League of Ireland Cup & EFL Cup)		Other		Total	
Club	Season	Division	Apps	Goals	Apps	Goals	Apps	Goals	Apps	Goals	Apps	Goals
Finn Harps	2017	League of Ireland Premier Division	3	0	0	0	0	0	–		3	0
Doncaster Rovers	2018–19	EFL League One	0	0	0	0	0	0	2 (Note: Appearance(s) in the EFL Trophy)	0	2	0
Doncaster Rovers	2019–20	EFL League One	0	0	0	0	0	0	2	0	2	0
Doncaster Rovers	Total		0	0	0	0	0	0	4	0	4	0
Tamworth (loan)	2018–19	Southern Football League	2	0	0	0	–		0	0	2	0
Grantham Town (loan)	2018–19	Northern Premier League	4	0	0	0	–		0	0	4	0
Blyth Spartans (loan)	2019–20	National League North	1	0	0	0	–		0	0	1	0
Sligo Rovers	2021	League of Ireland Premier Division	12	1	0	0	–		2 (Note: Appearance(s) in the UEFA Europa Conference League)	0	14	1
Sligo Rovers	2022	League of Ireland Premier Division	25	0	0	0	–		6	1	31	1
Sligo Rovers	Total		37	1	1	0	0	0	8	1	46	2
Motherwell	2022–23	Scottish Premiership	8	0	1	0	0	0	–		9	0
Motherwell	2023–24	Scottish Premiership	24	2	0	0	4	0	–		28	2
Motherwell	2024–25	Scottish Premiership	11	0	1	0	5	1	–		17	1
Motherwell	Total		43	2	2	0	9	1	0	0	54	3
Livingston	2025–26	Scottish Premiership	5	0	0	0	3	1	–		8	1
Sligo Rovers (loan)	2026	League of Ireland Premier Division	10	0	–		–		–		10	0
Career total			105	3	2	0	12	2	12	1	131	6
