= Olly Whyte =

Scottish footballer

Personal information
- Date of birth: 27 November 2006 (age 19)
- Place of birth: Glasgow, Scotland
- Position: Midfielder

Team information
- Current team: Ayr United (on loan from Motherwell)
- Number: 12

Youth career
- –2025: Motherwell

Senior career*
Years	Team	Apps	(Gls)
2023–	Motherwell	1	(0)
2024–2025	→ Cowdenbeath (loan)	25	(3)
2025–2026	→ Stenhousemuir (loan)	33	(6)
2026–	→ Ayr United (loan)	9	(0)
- * Club domestic league appearances and goals as of 9 November 2026

Olly Whyte (born 27 November 2006) is a Scottish professional footballer who plays as a midfielder for Ayr United on loan from Scottish Premiership club Motherwell.

== Career ==
=== Club ===
On 24 May 2024, Motherwell announced that they had extended their contract with Whyte until the summer of 2025.

On 17 July 2024, Motherwell announced that Whyte had joined Cowdenbeath on loan until January 2025. On On 9 January 2025, Whyte extended his loan with Cowdenbeath until the end of the season. Whilst at Cowdenbeath, Whyte won the Player of the Year, Players' Player of the Year, Supporters' Player of the Year and The Coo Shed Podcast Player of the Year.

On 28 May 2025, Motherwell announced that they had again extended their contract with Whyte.

On 7 August 2025, Motherwell announced that they had also entered into a Cooperation Agreement with Scottish League One side Stenhousemuir, and that Whyte had joined them on a Co-Operation Loan agreement.

On 20 May 2026, Whyte again extended his contract with Motherwell. On 23 July 2026, Whyte made his debut for Motherwell, coming on in the 93rd minute for Martin Moormann in Motherwells 2–0 victory over Faroese club HB in the UEFA Conference League.

On 3 September 2026, Whyte joined Ayr United on loan for the remainder of the 2026–27 season.

== Career statistics ==
As of match played on 7 November 2026

Appearances and goals by club, season and competition
Club	Season	League			National Cup (Note: Includes Scottish Cup)		League Cup (Note: Includes Scottish League Cup)		Continental		Other		Total	
Club	Season	Division	Apps	Goals	Apps	Goals	Apps	Goals	Apps	Goals	Apps	Goals	Apps	Goals
Motherwell	2023–24	Premiership	0	0	0	0	0	0	—				0	0
Motherwell	2024–25	Premiership	0	0	0	0	0	0	—				0	0
Motherwell	2025–26	Premiership	0	0	0	0	0	0	—				0	0
Motherwell	2026–27	Premiership	1	0	0	0	1	0	5 (Note: Appearances and goals in the UEFA Conference League)	0	—		7	0
Motherwell	Total		1	0	0	0	1	0	5	0	—		7	0
Cowdenbeath (loan)	2023–24	Lowland League	25	3	3	0	0	0	—		3 (Note: Appearances and goals in the Scottish Challenge Cup)	0	31	3
Stenhousemuir (loan)	2025–26	League One	33	6	3	0	0	0	—		11 (Note: Seven appearances and three goals in the Scottish Challenge Cup, four appearances and one goal in the Scottish Championship playoffs)	4	47	10
Ayr United (loan)	2026–27	Scottish Championship	9	0	0	0	0	0	—		—		9	0
Career total			68	9	6	0	1	0	5	0	14	4	94	13
