= Motherwell F.C. Under-20s and Academy =

Motherwell Under-20s
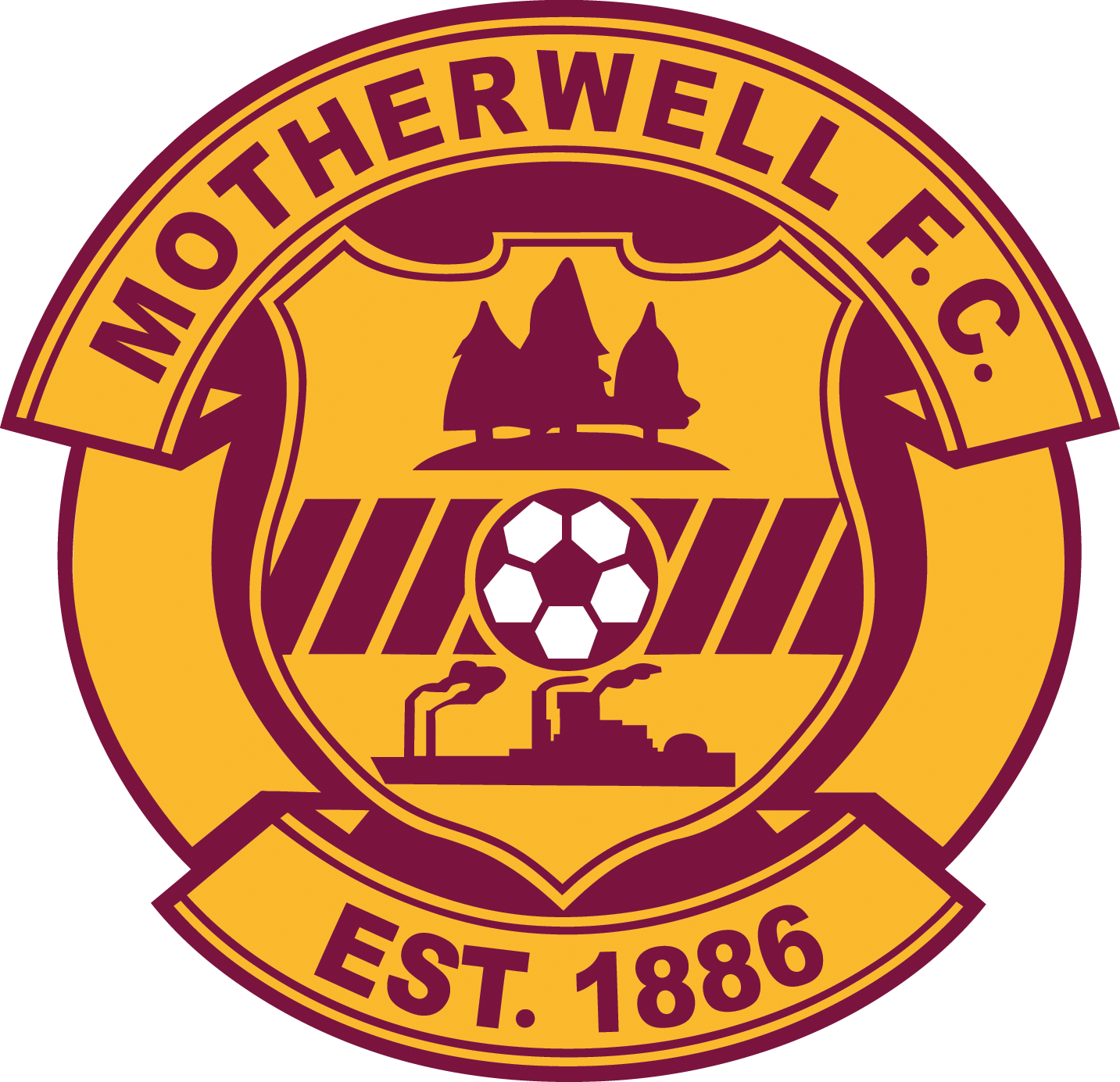
- Full name: Motherwell Football Club Under-20s

In addition to the Motherwell F.C. first team, competing in the Scottish Premiership, the club also has a reserve team who play in the SPFL Reserve League as well as younger age group teams in their youth system. They fielded a reserve team in defunct competitions for many years.

== Reserve Team ==
In the early 1950s, reserve teams were incorporated into the third tier of the senior Scottish Football League, with Motherwell 'A' taking part for six seasons of the arrangement.

Motherwell were an ever-present in the Scottish Premier Reserve League since its formation in the 1998–99 season. Initially starting as an Under-21 league, the reserve league was open to all age groups from season 2004–05.

The Motherwell reserve team withdrew their team from the 2009–10 season due to financial constraints and a lack of support from other clubs, leading to the competition's abandonment. Motherwell Reserves then played friendly matches.

In July 2018, it was reported that reserve leagues would be reintroduced in lieu of the development leagues that had been in place since 2009. The top tier of the new SPFL Reserve League featured 18 clubs, whilst a second-tier reserve League comprised nine clubs. Other than a minimum age of 16, no age restrictions applied to the leagues. At the end of its first season (2018–19) several clubs intimated that they would withdraw from the Reserve League to play a variety of challenge matches, but Motherwell were one of those who chose to remain.

Motherwell Reserves usually played their home matches at Dalziel Park, a sports facility outside Motherwell that is also the training ground of the first-team, but also used Forthbank Stadium in Stirling and Excelsior Stadium in Airdrie.

== Under 20s Team ==
=== History ===
Until 1998, Motherwell competed in the youth competitions administered by the Scottish Football League. They then took part in the age group leagues run by the Scottish Premier League and the Scottish Professional Football League.

From 2015 onwards it is possible for the Well academy to participate in the UEFA Youth League by their under-18 side (previously under-17s) winning the prior season's league at that age group; however this has not yet been achieved.

The Scottish Youth Cup (which began in 1985) is administered separately, with Motherwell winning the competition for the first time in 2016.

For the 2016–17 edition of the Scottish Challenge Cup, under-20 teams of Premiership clubs were granted entry to compete against adult teams for the first time in the modern era. In the 2018–19 edition, with the age now changed to under-21s, Motherwell reached the quarter-final stage, the best performance by a 'colt' team up to that point, losing 2–1 to eventual winners Ross County.

Having played home games at Fir Park, Hannah Park (Shotts) and Creamery Park (Bathgate), their regular stadium is now Airdrie's Excelsior Stadium.

In 2015, former Motherwell captain Stephen Craigan coached the Under-20 side. In 2019, Maurice Ross was appointed coach.

=== Reserve team ===
Note: Flags indicate national team as defined under FIFA eligibility rules; some limited exceptions apply. Players may hold more than one non-FIFA nationality.

No.	Pos.	Nation	Player
26	DF	SCO	Jon-Joe Friel
27	MF	SCO	Mikey Booth
28	MF	SCO	Aaron Buchanan
30	DF	SCO	Jack Dalziel
31	GK	SCO	Jack McConnell
32	FW	SCO	Robbie Hunter
33	DF	SCO	Aiden Tearney
34	DF	SCO	Aaron Thomson
35	MF	SCO	Blane Watson

No.	Pos.	Nation	Player
36	FW	SCO	Lucas Weir
37	FW	SCO	Jude Henderson
38	FW	SCO	Joshua Clarkson
39	FW	SCO	Leo Lee
40	DF	SCO	Scott McCrimmon
41	GK	SCO	Lewis McGahey
42	DF	SCO	Kai McFarlane
43	DF	ENG	Samuel Ngandu
44	DF	SCO	Matthew Pettigrew

== Academy ==
The club also operates the Motherwell Academy. The academy was formed in 2012, and consists of teams made up of players and coaches from Under-11 to Under-17 level. The youth teams train at a sports facility based within Braidhurst High School. From 2013 the director was former Motherwell captain Scott Leitch, later being replaced by Steven Hammell who also had the same role as a player until his retirement.

In 2017, the Motherwell academy was one of eight across the country designated 'elite' status on the introduction of Project Brave, an SFA initiative to concentrate the development of the best young players at a smaller number of clubs with high quality facilities and coaching than was previously the case.

== Honours ==
Reserves

- Scottish Reserve League (Note: Includes the Scottish Reserve League 1910–1915 / 1945–1949, the Scottish (Reserve) League 1955–1975, the Scottish Reserve League 1975–1998 and the Scottish Premier Reserve League 2004–2009. Any wins in the Scottish Football Alliance (1918–1939) or the SFL Division C (1949–1955) are listed separately. Any wins in the SPL Under-21 league (1998–2004) are listed in the Youth section.)
  - Winners: 1912–13
  - Runners-up: 1988–89, 1994–95, 2006–07
- SPFL Reserve Cup
  - Runners-up: 2018–19
- Scottish 2nd XI Cup
  - Winners: 1942–43, 1948–49, 1956–57
- Scottish Reserve League Cup
  - Winners: 1987–88

Youths

- Scottish Youth Cup
  - Winners: 2016
  - Runners-up: 1987
- SPFL Development League (Note: Since 1998; previously known as the Scottish Premier Under-18/Under-19/Under-20 League and SPFL Under-20 League.)
  - Runner-up (3): 2004–05, 2005–06, 2009–10

=== Graduates ===
Players who have gone on to play for their country at full international level are marked in bold whilst those still at the club are marked in italics.

- (Scotland) **Phil O'Donnell**
- (Scotland) **Lee McCulloch**
- (Scotland) Dougie Ramsay
- (Scotland) **Steven Hammell**
- (Scotland) **James McFadden**
- (Scotland) Brian Dempsie
- (Scotland) **Stephen Pearson**
- (Scotland) Shaun Fagan
- (Scotland) Kenny Wright
- (Scotland) Willie Kinniburgh
- (Scotland) David Clarke
- (Scotland) Kevin MacDonald
- (Scotland) Paul Quinn
- (Scotland) **David Clarkson**
- (Scotland) Marc Fitzpatrick
- (Scotland) Darren Smith
- (Scotland) Bobby Donnelly
- (Scotland) Adam Coakley
- (Scotland) Mark Reynolds
- (Scotland) Kenny Connolly
- (Scotland) **Jamie Murphy**
- (Scotland) Bob McHugh
- (Scotland) **Steven Saunders**
- (England) Shaun Hutchinson
- (Scotland) Paul Slane
- (Scotland) Ross Forbes
- (Scotland) Mark Archdeacon
- (Scotland) Jordan Halsman
- (Scotland) Steven Meechan
- (Scotland) Jamie Pollock
- (Scotland) Gary Smith
- (Scotland) Stuart Carswell
- (Scotland) Steven Lawless
- (Scotland) Ross Stewart
- (Scotland) Craig Moore
- (Scotland) Euan Murray
- (Scotland) Jack Leitch
- (Scotland) Dale Shirkie
- (Scotland) **Chris Cadden**
- (Scotland) Lee Erwin
- (Scotland) David Ferguson
- (Scotland) Dom Thomas
- (Scotland) Luke Watt
- (Scotland) Ross MacLean
- (Northern Ireland) Ben Hall
- (Scotland) Dylan Mackin
- (Scotland) Jack McMillan
- (Scotland) Jake Hastie
- (Scotland) **Allan Campbell**
- (Scotland) Adam Livingstone
- (Scotland) **David Turnbull**
- (Scotland) Barry Maguire
- (Scotland) James Scott
- (Scotland) Jamie Semple
- (Scotland) David Devine
- (Scotland) **Max Johnston**
- (Scotland) Kian Speirs
- (Scotland) **Lennon Miller**
- (Scotland) Luca Ross
- (Scotland) Ewan Wilson
- (Scotland) Mark Ferrie
- (Scotland) Dylan Wells
- (Scotland) Brannan McDermott
- (Scotland) Matthew Connelly
- (Scotland) Zander McAllister
- (Scotland) Rocco McColm
- (Scotland) Mikey Booth
- (Scotland) Lucas Weir
- (Scotland) Olly Whyte

==== Statistics ====
As of match played 17 October 2026

Academy graduates Motherwell F.C. and international careers
Player	Position	Age of debut	Motherwell					International			U21/U23 International		
Player	Position	Age of debut	Motherwell Career	Manager	Debut date	Apps	Goals	Country	Apps	Goals	Country	Apps	Goals
(Scotland) Phil O'Donnell	Midfielder	18 years, 244 days	1990–1994; 2004–2007	Tommy McLean	24 November 1990	233	27	Scotland	1	0	Scotland	8	0
(Scotland) Lee McCulloch	Midfielder	18 years, 102 days	1994–2001	Alex McLeish	24 August 1996	147	27	Scotland	18	1	–		
(Scotland) Dougie Ramsay	Midfielder	19 years, 286 days	1997–2003	Billy Davies	6 February 1999	42	2	–			–		
(Scotland) Steven Hammell	Defender	18 years, 64 days	1999–2006; 2008–2018	Billy Davies	22 April 2000	583	5	Scotland	1	0	Scotland	12	1
(Scotland) James McFadden	Forward	17 years, 256 days	2000–2003; 2013–2014; 2015–2017	Billy Davies	26 December 2000	123	44	Scotland	48	15	–		
(Scotland) Brian Dempsie	Defender	18 years, 13 days	1999–2003	Billy Davies	17 February 2001	1	0	–			–		
(Scotland) Stephen Pearson	Midfielder	18 years, 153 days	2000–2004; 2015–2016; 2017	Billy Davies	4 March 2001	142	24	Scotland	10	0	Scotland	8	0
(Scotland) Shaun Fagan	Midfielder	16 years, 274 days	2000–2007	Eric Black	21 April 2002	84	3	–			Scotland	1	0
(Scotland) Kenny Wright	Forward	16 years, 269 days	2002–2006	Terry Butcher	27 April 2002	26	2	–			–		
(Scotland) Willie Kinniburgh	Defender	16 years, 295 days	2001–2008	Terry Butcher	12 May 2002	65	3	–			Scotland	2	0
(Scotland) David Clarke	Midfielder	18 years, 324 days	1999–2003	Terry Butcher	12 May 2002	2	0	–			–		
(Scotland) Kevin MacDonald	Midfielder	19 years, 96 days	1999–2004	Terry Butcher	12 May 2002	14	0	–			–		
(Scotland) Paul Quinn	Defender	17 years, 133 days	2002–2009	Terry Butcher	1 December 2002	183	4	–			Scotland	3	0
(Scotland) David Clarkson	Forward	20 years, 66 days	2002–2009; 2015–2016	Terry Butcher	7 December 2002	261	56	Scotland	2	1	Scotland	11	1
(Scotland) Marc Fitzpatrick	Defender	18 years, 1 day	2004–2011	Terry Butcher	12 May 2004	143	5	–			Scotland	3	0
(Scotland) Darren Smith	Forward	16 years, 190 days	2004–2010	Terry Butcher	3 October 2004	70	7	–			Scotland	1	0
(Scotland) Bobby Donnelly	Defender	18 years, 216 days	2005–2007	Terry Butcher	23 August 2005	6	0	–			–		
(Scotland) Adam Coakley	Forward	18 years, 68 days	2004–2007	Terry Butcher	26 December 2005	4	0	–			–		
(Scotland) Mark Reynolds	Defender	19 years, 357 days	2005–2011	Terry Butcher	3 May 2006	202	6	–			Scotland	3	0
(Scotland) Kenny Connolly	Midfieler	20 years, 240 days	2004–2008	Maurice Malpas	6 January 2007	1	0	–			–		
(Scotland) Jamie Murphy	Forward	17 years, 222 days	2008–2013	Maurice Malpas	7 April 2007	215	50	Scotland	2	0	Scotland	13	4
(Scotland) Bob McHugh	Forward	16 years, 311 days	2007–2015	Mark McGhee	22 May 2008	92	8	–			–		
(Scotland) Steven Saunders	Defender	17 years, 244 days	2008–2013	Mark McGhee	29 November 2008	74	2	Scotland	1	0	Scotland	2	0
(England) Shaun Hutchinson	Defender	18 years, 174 days	2009–2014	Mark McGhee	16 May 2009	144	9	–			–		
(Scotland) Paul Slane	Midfielder	17 years, 172 days	2009–2010	Mark McGhee	16 May 2009	9	1	–			–		
(Scotland) Ross Forbes	Midfielder	19 years, 266 days	2007–2012	Jim Gannon	2 July 2009	77	10	–			–		
(Scotland) Mark Archdeacon	Forward	19 years, 273 days	2008–2010	Jim Gannon	9 July 2009	1	0	–			–		
(Scotland) Jordan Halsman	Defender	18 years, 126 days	2010–2012	Jim Gannon	17 October 2009	3	0	–			–		
(Scotland) Steven Meechan	Midfielder	18 years, 257 days	2009–2011	Jim Gannon	12 December 2009	4	0	–			–		
(Scotland) Jamie Pollock	Midfielder	18 years, 257 days	2009–2012	Jim Gannon	12 December 2009	5	0	–			–		
(Scotland) Gary Smith	Forward	19 years, 48 days	2009–2012	Craig Brown	15 July 2010	4	0	–			–		
(Scotland) Stuart Carswell	Midfielder	17 years, 212 days	2011–2015	Stuart McCall	9 April 2011	99	0	–			–		
(Scotland) Steven Lawless	Midfielder	17 years, 349 days	2009–2012, 2021	Stuart McCall	24 August 2011	18	2	–			–		
(Scotland) Ross Stewart	Goalkeeper	18 years, 32 days	2012–2015	Stuart McCall	12 May 2013	1	0	–			–		
(Scotland) Craig Moore	Forward	18 years, 357 days	2011–2017	Stuart McCall	8 August 2013	30	1	–			–		
(Scotland) Euan Murray	Defender	19 years, 293 days	2011–2014	Stuart McCall	9 November 2013	3	0	–			–		
(Scotland) Jack Leitch	Midfielder	18 years, 136 days	2013–2016	Stuart McCall	30 November 2013	32	0	–			–		
(Scotland) Dale Shirkie	Forward	18 years, 299 days	2012–2014	Stuart McCall	25 February 2014	1	0	–			–		
(Scotland) Chris Cadden	Defender	17 years, 163 days	2013–2019	Stuart McCall	1 March 2014	139	12	Scotland	2	0	Scotland	12	1
(Scotland) Lee Erwin	Forward	20 years, 120 days	2012–2015	Stuart McCall	17 July 2014	38	6	–			–		
(Scotland) David Ferguson	Defender	17 years, 328 days	2013–2017	Stuart McCall	13 August 2014	16	0	–			–		
(Scotland) Dom Thomas	Midfielder	18 years, 309 days	2014–2017	Stuart McCall	20 December 2014	39	0	–			–		
(Scotland) Luke Watt	Defender	17 years, 297 days	2014–2018	Ian Baraclough	4 January 2015	10	0	–			–		
(Scotland) Ross MacLean	Midfielder	17 years, 303 days	2014–2019	Ian Baraclough	10 January 2015	22	1	–			–		
(Northern Ireland) Ben Hall	Defender	18 years, 330 days	2015–2016	Mark McGhee	12 December 2015	19	1	–			Northern Ireland	3	0
(Scotland) Dylan Mackin	Forward	18 years, 331 days	2013–2017	Mark McGhee	12 December 2015	5	2	–			–		
(Scotland) Jack McMillan	Defender	18 years, 302 days	2016–2018	Mark McGhee	15 October 2016	16	0	–			–		
(Scotland) Jake Hastie	Midfielder	17 years, 211 days	2016–2019	Mark McGhee	15 October 2016	42	8	–			Scotland	2	0
(Scotland) Allan Campbell	Midfielder	18 years, 117 days	2016–2021	Mark McGhee	29 October 2016	160	16	Scotland	1	0	Scotland	24	1
(Scotland) Adam Livingstone	Defender	19 years, 83 days	2017–2020	Stephen Robinson	16 May 2017	12	2	–			–		
(Scotland) David Turnbull	Midfielder	18 years, 215 days	2017–2020	Stephen Robinson	10 February 2018	41	16	Scotland	5	0	Scotland	5	1
(Scotland) Barry Maguire	Midfielder	19 years, 345 days	2017–2024	Stephen Robinson	7 April 2018	78	2	–			Scotland	8	2
(Scotland) James Scott	Forward	17 years, 234 days	2017–2020	Stephen Robinson	21 April 2018	42	7	–			Scotland	3	0
(Scotland) Jamie Semple	Defender	17 years, 345 days	2019–2021	Stephen Robinson	27 April 2019	8	1	–			–		
(Scotland) David Devine	Defender	17 years, 332 days	2018–2023	Stephen Robinson	18 May 2019	3	0	–			–		
(Scotland) Max Johnston	Defender	17 years, 49 days	2021–2023	Graham Alexander	13 February 2021	21	3	Scotland	4	0	Scotland	10	1
(Scotland) Kian Speirs	Midfielder	18 years, 70 days	2022–2023	Graham Alexander	31 July 2022	1	0	–			–		
(Scotland) Lennon Miller	Midfielder	16 years, 6 days	2022–2025	Steven Hammell	31 August 2022	76	6	Scotland	4	0	Scotland	5	2
(Scotland) Luca Ross	Forward	16 years, 139 days	2022–	Steven Hammell	28 December 2022	22	1	–			–		
(Scotland) Ewan Wilson	Defender	18 years, 238 days	2022–	Stuart Kettlewell	15 July 2023	52	1	–			Scotland	3	0
(Scotland) Mark Ferrie	Forward	17 years, 225 days	2022–2025	Stuart Kettlewell	15 July 2023	12	0	–			Scotland	3	0
(Scotland) Dylan Wells	Midfielder	17 years, 306 days	2022–2026	Stuart Kettlewell	20 January 2024	6	0	–			–		
(Scotland) Brannan McDermott	Defender	18 years, 134 days	2022–2025	Stuart Kettlewell	20 January 2024	1	0	–			–		
(Scotland) Matthew Connelly	Goalkeeper	22 years, 135 days	2019–	Jens Berthel Askou	15 July 2025	6	0	–			–		
(Scotland) Zander McAllister	Defender	17 years, 116 days	2024–	Jens Berthel Askou	16 August 2025	5	0	–			–		
(Scotland) Rocco McColm	Defender	17 years, 117 days	2024–2026	Jens Berthel Askou	24 January 2026	1	0	–			–		
(Scotland) Mikey Booth	Midfielder	19 years, 202 days	2026–	Alfred Johansson	23 July 2026	6	0	–			–		
(Scotland) Lucas Weir	Forward	17 years, 297 days	2026–	Alfred Johansson	23 July 2026	1	0	–			–		
(Scotland) Olly Whyte	Midfielder	19 years, 238 days	2026–	Alfred Johansson	23 July 2026	8	0	–			–		
Totals					69 Players	4,052	383	13 Players	98	17	23 Players	145	14

=== Careers elsewhere ===
A number of players attached to the Academy as schoolboys and scholars, as well as those who signed professionally but never made a first team appearance, have gone on play league football elsewhere. Those that have gone on to play for their country at full international level are marked in bold and those who made their league debut whilst away on loan are marked in Italics

- (Ghana) Alfredo Agyeman
- (Scotland) Adam Asghar
- (Scotland) Jamie Ewings
- (Scotland) David Gormley
- (Scotland) Robbie Hemfrey
- (Scotland) Chris Higgins
- (Scotland) Reece McAlear
- (Scotland) Ross McKinnon
- (Scotland) Stuart McKinstry
- (Scotland) Colbi Mcquarrie
- (Scotland) P. J. Morrison
- (Scotland) Morgyn Neill
- (Scotland) Josh Watt
- (Scotland) Scott Wilson
