= Ewan Wilson =

Scottish footballer

Personal information
- Full name: Ewan Wilson
- Date of birth: 19 November 2004 (age 21)
- Place of birth: Airdrie, Scotland
- Height: 1.82 m (6 ft 0 in)
- Position: Defender

Team information
- Current team: Raith Rovers (on loan from Motherwell)
- Number: 3

Youth career
- 2014–2022: Motherwell

Senior career*
Years	Team	Apps	(Gls)
2022–	Motherwell	31	(1)
2022–2023	→ Albion Rovers (loan)	20	(0)
2023–2024	→ Stirling Albion (loan)	14	(0)
2024	→ Beith Juniors (loan)	12	(2)
2025–	→ Raith Rovers (loan)	15	(0)

International career^{‡}
2024–	Scotland U21	3	(0)
- * Club domestic league appearances and goals as of 4 May 2026 ‡ National team caps and goals as of 09:15, 17 October 2024 (UTC)

Ewan Wilson (born 19 November 2004) is a Scottish footballer who plays as a defender for Scottish Premiership club Motherwell.

== Career ==
=== Club ===
On 28 June 2022, Motherwell announced that they had signed their fir professional contract with Wilson. On 30 September 2022, Wilson joined Albion Rovers on loan for the remainder of the season.

On 31 May 2023, Motherwell announced that they had offered a new contract to Wilson, with club confirming on 21 June 2023 that Wilsons contract had been extended until the summer of 2024.

On 29 September 2023, Wilson joined Stirling Albion on loan for the remainder of the season. On 6 March 2024, Wilson's loan to Stirling Albion was terminated and he joined Beith Juniors on loan for the remainder of the season.

On 24 May 2024, Motherwell announced that Wilson had extended his contract with the club until the summer of 2025. On 17 October 2024, Motherwell announced that Wilson had extended his contract with the club until the summer of 2027, with the option of an additional year.

On 29 August 2025, Wilson joined Raith Rovers on loan until January 2026. On 2 January 2026, Wilson's loan deal with Raith Rovers was extended until the end of the season.

== Career statistics ==
As of match played on 31 January 2026

Appearances and goals by club, season and competition
Club	Season	League			National Cup (Note: Includes Scottish Cup)		League Cup (Note: Includes Scottish League Cup)		Continental		Other		Total	
Club	Season	Division	Apps	Goals	Apps	Goals	Apps	Goals	Apps	Goals	Apps	Goals	Apps	Goals
Motherwell	2022–23	Scottish Premiership	0	0	0	0	0	0	—				0	0
Motherwell	2023–24	Scottish Premiership	0	0	0	0	2	0	—				2	0
Motherwell	2024–25	Scottish Premiership	31	1	1	0	7	0	—				39	1
Motherwell	2025–26	Scottish Premiership	0	0	0	0	4	0	—				4	0
Motherwell	Total		31	1	1	0	13	0	—				45	1
Albion Rovers (loan)	2022–23	Scottish League Two	20	0	0	0	0	0	—		2 (Note: Appearances in the Relegation playoff)	0	22	0
Stirling Albion (loan)	2023–24	Scottish League One	14	0	1	0	0	0	—				15	0
Beith Juniors (loan)	2023–24	West of Scotland Football League Premier Division	12	2	0	0	0	0	—		1 (Note: Appearances in the West of Scotland Football League Cup)	0	13	2
Raith Rovers (loan)	2025–26	Scottish Championship	12	0	2	0	0	0	—		1 (Note: Appearances in the Scottish Challenge Cup)	0	15	0
Career total			89	3	4	0	9	0	—		4	0	106	3

== Honours ==
Raith Rovers

- Scottish Challenge Cup: 2025–26
