= Archie Mair =

Scottish footballer (born 2001)

Personal information
- Full name: Archie Barclay Mair
- Date of birth: 10 February 2001 (age 25)
- Place of birth: Turriff, Scotland
- Height: 1.98 m (6 ft 6 in)
- Position: Goalkeeper

Team information
- Current team: Carlisle United
- Number: 16

Youth career
- Aberdeen
- 2019–2020: Norwich City

Senior career*
Years	Team	Apps	(Gls)
2020–2025	Norwich City	0	(0)
2020–2021	→ King's Lynn Town (loan)	23	(0)
2021–2022	→ Lincoln City (loan)	0	(0)
2022	→ Dartford (loan)	5	(0)
2023	→ Notts County (loan)	4	(0)
2023–2024	→ Gateshead (loan)	25	(0)
2024	→ Morecambe (loan)	21	(0)
2025	→ Motherwell (loan)	1	(0)
2025–2026	Morecambe	12	(0)
2026	→ Carlisle United (loan)	1	(0)
2026–	Carlisle United	1	(0)

International career^{‡}
2016–2018	Scotland U17	6	(0)
2018	Scotland U18	1	(0)
2018–2020	Scotland U19	7	(0)
2021	Scotland U21	2	(0)
- * Club domestic league appearances and goals as of 17:10, 16 September 2026 (UTC) ‡ National team caps and goals as of 16:44, 13 May 2023 (UTC)

Archie Barclay Mair (born 10 February 2001) is a Scottish professional footballer who plays as a goalkeeper for Carlisle United.

Starting his career with the youth teams of Aberdeen and Norwich City, Mair has spent loan spells at King's Lynn Town, Lincoln City, Dartford, Notts County, Gateshead, Morecambe and Motherwell.

Mair has also represented Scotland at youth international level.

== Club career ==
=== Norwich City ===
Born in Turriff, Mair began his career with Aberdeen, before playing for Norwich City, spending loan spells at King's Lynn Town and Lincoln City. He was recalled by Norwich in January 2022.

He signed on loan for Dartford in November 2022, and for Notts County in January 2023. Following his Notts County debut, he was praised by usual first-choice goalkeeper Sam Slocombe. Manager Luke Williams said that his performance "was good, but of course he was involved in two moments where I think the decisions he made were wrong". Mair was brought on as a late substitute for Slocombe in the National League play-off final, and he made two penalty saves in the shootout that won the club promotion to the Football League. Williams said Mair was brought on for the shootout as he had saved a penalty for the club previously, whereas Slocombe had not.

In July 2023 he signed on loan for Gateshead. Mair made 27 appearances in all competitions, before being recalled from his loan on 5 January 2024 in order to facilitate a loan move to EFL League Two club Morecambe.

In January 2025 he signed on loan for Motherwell.

On 28 April 2025, Norwich announced that Mair would be released from his contract at the end of the 2024‍–‍25 season.

=== Return to Morecambe ===
On 21 August 2025, Mair returned to Morecambe on a permanent basis.

=== Carlisle United ===
On 30 January 2026, he joined fellow National League club Carlisle United on loan for the remainder of the season. On 16 May 2026, Morecambe announced he was being released, and he returned to Carlisle on a permanent contract.

== International career ==
He has represented Scotland at youth international level, including at under-21 level.

== Career statistics ==
As of match played 8 August 2026

Club	Season	Division	League		National cup (Note: Includes FA Cup, Scottish Cup)		League cup (Note: Includes EFL Cup, Scottish League Cup)		Other		Total	
Club	Season	Division	Apps	Goals	Apps	Goals	Apps	Goals	Apps	Goals	Apps	Goals
Aberdeen U20	2017–18	—			—		—		1 (Note: Appearance(s) in Scottish Challenge Cup)	0	1	0
Aberdeen U20	2018–19	—			—		—		1	0	1	0
Aberdeen U20	Total		—		—		—		2	0	2	0
Norwich City U21	2019–20	—			—		—		1 (Note: Appearance(s) in EFL Trophy)	0	1	0
Norwich City	2020–21	Championship	0	0	0	0	0	0	—		0	0
Norwich City	2021–22	Premier League	0	0	0	0	0	0	—		0	0
Norwich City	2022–23	Championship	0	0	0	0	0	0	—		0	0
Norwich City	2023–24	Championship	0	0	0	0	0	0	0	0	0	0
Norwich City	2024–25	Championship	0	0	0	0	0	0	—		0	0
Norwich City	Total		0	0	0	0	0	0	0	0	0	0
King's Lynn Town (loan)	2020–21	National League	23	0	2	0	—		2 (Note: Appearance(s) in FA Trophy)	0	27	0
Lincoln City (loan)	2021–22	League One	0	0	0	0	0	0	0	0	0	0
Dartford (loan)	2022–23	National League South	5	0	0	0	—		0	0	5	0
Notts County (loan)	2022–23	National League	4	0	—		—		2 (Note: One appearance in FA Trophy, one appearance in play-offs)	0	6	0
Gateshead (loan)	2023–24	National League	25	0	1	0	—		0	0	26	0
Morecambe (loan)	2023–24	League Two	21	0	0	0	—		—		21	0
Motherwell (loan)	2024–25	Scottish Premiership	1	0	1	0	0	0	—		2	0
Morecambe	2025–26	National League	12	0	0	0	—		0	0	12	0
Carlisle United (loan)	2025–26	National League	1	0	—		—		—		1	0
Carlisle United	2026–27	National League	1	0	0	0	—		0	0	1	0
Career total			93	0	4	0	0	0	7	0	104	0

== Honours ==
Notts County

- National League play-offs: 2023
