= Filip Stuparević =

Serbian footballer

Personal information
- Full name: Filip Stuparević
- Date of birth: 30 August 2000 (age 26)
- Place of birth: Belgrade, FR Yugoslavia
- Height: 1.84 m (6 ft 0 in)
- Position: Forward

Team information
- Current team: Napredak Kruševac
- Number: 9

Youth career
- Rad
- 2016–2017: Voždovac

Senior career*
Years	Team	Apps	(Gls)
2016–2019	Voždovac	69	(10)
2019–2021	Watford	0	(0)
2019	→ Příbram (loan)	9	(0)
2020	→ Voždovac (loan)	9	(0)
2021–2022	Metalac Gornji Milanovac	27	(4)
2022–2023	Al Orooba		
2023–2024	Domžale	22	(6)
2024–2026	Motherwell	0	(0)
2024–2025	→ Greenock Morton (loan)	16	(5)
2026	ÍBV	5	(0)
2026–	Napredak Kruševac	3	(1)

International career
2016–2017	Serbia U17	9	(5)
2018–2019	Serbia U19	5	(0)
2018–2021	Serbia U21	13	(1)
- * Club domestic league appearances and goals as of 15 August 2026

Filip Stuparević (Serbian Cyrillic: Филип Ступаревић; born 30 August 2000) is a Serbian professional footballer who plays as a forward for Napredak Kruševac.

== Club career ==
=== Voždovac ===
==== 2016–17 season ====
Born in Belgrade, Stuparević passed Rad's football academy. He moved to Voždovac in summer 2016, penning a three-year professional contract with the club. Stuparević made his senior debut for Voždovac in the first round of the 2016–17 Serbian SuperLiga season on 23 July 2016, at the age of 15. Replacing Slaviša Radović in the 88th minute of a match against Spartak Subotica, he became the youngest player in the Serbian SuperLiga history. After his appearance was confirmed as irregular by the rules, the match was registered as a 3–0 win for Spartak. During the season, Stuparević made nine appearances in the league, all as a back-up player, and also appeared for the youth team.

==== 2017–18 season ====
Stuparević started the 2017–18 season as a back-up choice for Dejan Georgijević. He started his first senior match on the field against Borac Čačak in the third round, played on 5 August 2017. Several days later, Stuparević scored the first goal in his professional career in a 3–1 away victory against Partizan, after which he was voted as the player of the week in the Serbian SuperLiga.

=== Motherwell ===
On 20 June 2024, Scottish Premiership club Motherwell announced the signing of Stuparević on a two-year contract, with an option of a third year. On 27 September 2024, Stuparević joined Greenock Morton on loan for the remainder of the 2024–25 season.

On 30 January 2026, Motherwell announced the departure of Stuparević after his contract was ended by mutual agreement, he'd scored one goal in four appearances during his time with the club.

=== ÍBV ===
On 3 April 2026, Besta deild karla club, ÍBV announced the signing of Stuparević.

== International career ==
Stuparević was part of the first Serbian under-15 national team, formed at the end of 2014. Later, he was also called into the under-16 team. Playing for the team, Stuparević scored in matches against Moldova, Ukraine, Latvia and Croatia. In summer 2017, Stuparević had been invited to the Serbia under-17 team by manager Ilija Stolica. On 22 March 2017, he scored the only goal of the game in a 1–0 win against Montenegro, after which Serbia qualified for the 2017 UEFA European Under-17 Championship. Playing at the tournament under coach Perica Ognjenović, Stuparević scored from the penalty kick in a match against Germany.
