= Kenton Richardson =

English footballer (born 1999)

Personal information
- Full name: Kenton Terry Richardson
- Date of birth: 26 June 1999 (age 27)
- Place of birth: Durham, England
- Height: 6 ft 1 in (1.85 m)
- Position: Defender

Team information
- Current team: Carlisle United
- Number: 2

Youth career
- 2015–2017: Hartlepool United

Senior career*
Years	Team	Apps	(Gls)
2017–2020	Hartlepool United	43	(0)
2020–2022	Sunderland	0	(0)
2021	→ Notts County (loan)	1	(0)
2021–2022	→ Spennymoor Town (loan)	27	(0)
2022–2026	Gateshead	113	(5)
2026–	Carlisle United	0	(0)

International career^{‡}
2023–	England C	1	(0)
- * Club domestic league appearances and goals as of 00:52, 26 April 2026 (UTC) ‡ National team caps and goals as of 21:51, 21 March 2023 (UTC)

Kenton Terry Richardson (born 26 June 1999) is an English professional footballer who plays as a defender for National League club Carlisle United.

== Club career ==
Richardson came through the youth team at Hartlepool United. He made his senior debut for Hartlepool as a substitute for Liam Donnelly in a 4–0 defeat to Mansfield Town on 11 February 2017. Richardson signed his first professional contract in March 2017 alongside three other Hartlepool players.

Following the expiration of his contract with Hartlepool, Richardson joined League One side Sunderland on a two-year deal, initially joining the club's under-23 side.

On 8 March 2021, Richardson joined National League side Notts County on loan until 5 April 2021. However, an injury meant that Richardson only played one game for County.

Richardson made his Sunderland debut on 5 October 2021 in an EFL Trophy win against Lincoln City.

Richardson joined National League North side Spennymoor Town on a 28 day loan deal on 12 November 2021. The loan deal was later extended until the end of the season.

After Sunderland's promotion to the Championship, it was announced in May 2022 that Richardson was one of 16 players released by the club. He made three appearances in total for the Black Cats – all in the EFL Trophy.

On 9 June 2022, Richardson signed for National League side Gateshead on a one-year deal. Ahead of the 2025–26 season, Richardson was named as Gateshead's new club captain.

In June 2026, he turned down a new contract at Gateshead and signed for fellow National League side Carlisle United on a free transfer.

== International career ==
In March 2023, Richardson received his first call up for the England C team for their game against Wales C.

== Personal life ==
Kenton's grandfather Fred Richardson was a professional footballer who played for Chelsea, Hartlepools United, Barnsley, Chester and West Brom. Richardson is a boyhood Sunderland fan.

== Career statistics ==
As of 3 April 2026

Club	Season	Division	League		FA Cup		League Cup		Other		Total	
Club	Season	Division	Apps	Goals	Apps	Goals	Apps	Goals	Apps	Goals	Apps	Goals
Hartlepool United	2016–17	League Two	11	0	0	0	0	0	0	0	11	0
Hartlepool United	2017–18	National League	6	0	1	0	0	0	0	0	7	0
Hartlepool United	2018–19	National League	16	0	2	0	0	0	2 (Note: Appearance(s) in FA Trophy)	0	20	0
Hartlepool United	2019–20	National League	10	0	4	0	0	0	1	0	15	0
Total			43	0	7	0	0	0	3	0	53	0
Sunderland	2020–21	League One	0	0	0	0	0	0	0	0	0	0
Sunderland	2021–22	League One	0	0	0	0	0	0	3 (Note: Appearances in EFL Trophy)	0	3	0
Total			0	0	0	0	0	0	3	0	3	0
Notts County (loan)	2020–21	National League	1	0	0	0	0	0	0	0	1	0
Spennymoor Town (loan)	2021–22	National League North	27	0	0	0	0	0	4	0	31	0
Gateshead	2022–23	National League	27	1	1	0	0	0	5	0	33	1
Gateshead	2023–24	National League	39	2	2	0	0	0	4	0	45	2
Gateshead	2024–25	National League	15	1	0	0	0	0	1	0	16	1
Gateshead	2025–26	National League	32	1	1	0	0	0	2	0	35	1
Gateshead	Total		113	5	4	0	0	0	12	0	129	5
Career total			184	5	11	0	0	0	22	0	217	5

== Honours ==
Gateshead

- FA Trophy: 2023–24; runner-up: 2022–23
