= 2025–26 Motherwell F.C. season =

Motherwell
2025–26 season
- Chairman: Kyrk Macmillan
- Manager: Jens Berthel Askou
- Stadium: Fir Park
- Premiership: 4th
- Scottish Cup: Fifth round vs Aberdeen
- League Cup: Semi-final vs St Mirren
- Top goalscorer: League: Tawanda Maswanhise (17); All: Tawanda Maswanhise (22)
- Highest home attendance: 12,306 vs Hearts (9 May 2026)
- Lowest home attendance: 2,657 vs Peterhead (15 July 2025)
- Average home league attendance: 8,169 (4 April 2026)
Home colours	Away colours	Third colours

The 2025–26 season was Motherwell's forty-first consecutive season in the top flight of Scottish football, having been promoted from the Scottish First Division at the end of the 1984–85 season.

== Season review ==
=== Preseason ===
On 23 May, Motherwell confirmed that Manager Michael Wimmer had left the club to take up a similar role at SSV Jahn Regensburg.

On 26 May, Motherwell announced that they would return to Delden in the Netherlands for a pre-season camp, during which they would face FC Twente and an as unnamed club.

On 27 May, Motherwell announced the signing of Lukas Fadinger on a free-transfer from Rheindorf Altach, to a two-year contract.

On 28 May, Motherwell announced that Shane Blaney, Ross Callachan, Mark Ferrie, Max Ross, Brannan McDermott, Zack Flatman, Derin Marshall, Ross Nelson and Zack Tomany would all leave the club at the end of their contracts. Olly Whyte, Campbell Forrest, Mikey Booth and Scott Williamson had extended their contracts, whilst contract discussions where on going with Steve Seddon, Dan Casey, Dominic Thompson, Davor Zdravkovski, Harry Paton and Moses Ebiye.

=== June ===
On 2 June, Motherwell announced the signing of Jordan McGhee on a free-transfer after his Dundee contract had expired, on a contract until the summer of 2027 with the option of another year.

On 3 June, Motherwell announced that they would play Carlisle United in a behind-closed doors friendly at Fir Park on 8 July.

On 9 June, Motherwell confirmed that Dan Casey had turned down a new contract from Motherwell in order to pursue options down in England.

On 12 June, Motherwell announced the appointment of Jens Berthel Askou as their new manager.

On 16 June, Motherwell confirmed that Steve Seddon, Harry Paton, Davor Zdravkovski and Moses Ebiye had all left the club after their contracts hadn't been renewed.

On 26 June, Motherwell announced the signing of Elliot Watt to a two-year contract, with an option of a third, after his contract with Burton Albion was terminated.

On 30 June, Motherwell announced that Matthew Connelly had signed a new one-year contract with the club.

=== July ===
On 3 July, Motherwell announced that they had signed professional contracts with Aiden Tearney, Jack Dalziel, Aaron Thomson, Lucas Weir, Robbie Hunter, Blane Watson and Aaron Buchanan. At the same time, Motherwell also announced that they had signed amateur contracts with Evan Samuel, Olivier Wieczorek and Kali Fraser-Traljic.

On 7 July, Motherwell announced the signing of Eseosa Sule on a season-long loan deal from West Bromwich Albion.

On 9 July, Motherwell announced the signing of Elijah Just from AC Horsens to a two-year contract, with the option of a third, for an undisclosed fee.

On 10 July, Motherwell announced the signing of Emmanuel Longelo from Birmingham City to a two-year contract, with the option of a third, for an undisclosed fee.

On 11 July, Motherwell announced the signing of Ibrahim Said from Viborg to a two-year contract, with the option of a third, for an undisclosed fee.

On 29 July, Motherwell announced Tawanda Maswanhise as their player-of-the-month for July.

=== August ===
On 5 August, Motherwell announced a new Cooperation Agreement with Lowland Football League side Cowdenbeath, enabling Scottish Under-21 players join the club on loan to increase their first-team opportunities and aid development. As part of the collaboration, Nathan Lawson and Scott Williamson joined Cowdenbeath on this Cooperation loan, allowing them to move freely between Motherwell and Cowdenbeath throughout the season.

On 7 August, Motherwell announced that they had also entered into a Cooperation Agreement with Scottish League One side Stenhousemuir, with Olly Whyte joining them on a Co-Operation Loan agreement. Later the same day, goalkeeper Matthew Connelly joined Airdrieonians on loan for the remainder of the season.

On 12 August, Lennon Miller left the club to sign a five-year contract with Serie A side Udinese, for a club record rumoured £4.75m fee plus add-ons.

On 14 August, Motherwell announced that Tawanda Maswanhise had signed a new contract with the club, until the summer of 2027, with the option of an additional year.

On 15 August, Motherwell announced the season-long loan signing of Esapa Osong from Nottingham Forest.

On 18 August, Motherwell announced the signing of Callum Hendry from Milton Keynes Dons, to a two-year contract with the option of an additional year.

On 22 August, Motherwell announced the signing of Regan Charles-Cook from Eupen, to a two-year contract.

On 26 August, Motherwell announced the signing of Oscar Priestman from Western Sydney Wanderers, to a three-year contract.

On 29 August, Ewan Wilson joined Raith Rovers on loan until the end of the year.

=== September ===
On 1 September, transfer deadline day for the summer window, Motherwell announced the signing of Stephen Welsh on loan from Celtic for the remainder of the season.

On 16 September, Motherwell announced Tawanda Maswanhise as their player-of-the-month for August.

=== October ===
On 8 October, Motherwell announced Elliot Watt as their player-of-the-month for September.

On 27 October, Motherwell announced that they had recalled Matthew Connelly from his loan Airdrieonians after fellow goalkeeper Aston Oxborough sustained a hand injury during the warm up before their match at Livingston on 25 October.

=== November ===
On 13 November, Motherwell announced Elliot Watt as their player-of-the-month for October.

=== December ===
On 11 December, Motherwell announced Tawanda Maswanhise as their player-of-the-month for November.

On 12 December, Motherwell announced that they had extended their contract with Calum Ward until the summer of 2027, with the option of an additional year.

On 19 December, Colbi Mcquarrie joined Stenhousemuir on a seven-day emergency loan.

=== January ===
On 1 January, Motherwell announced that Eseosa Sule's on a season-long loan deal from West Bromwich Albion had been ended early after he suffered a serious thigh injury in August. Later the same day, Motherwell announced that Paul McGinn had signed a contract extension until the summer of 2027.

On 2 January, Ewan Wilson's loan deal with Raith Rovers was extended until the end of the season.

On 12 January, Motherwell announced that Stephen Welsh had returned to Celtic after his parent club exercised their recall option, and Kofi Balmer joined Bristol Rovers on loan until the end of the season.

On 15 January, Motherwell announced that they had signed a new contract with Stephen O'Donnell, keeping him at the club until the summer of 2027. Later the same day, Dylan Wells joined Stirling Albion on loan for the rest of the season.

On 19 January, Motherwell announced that Esapa Osong had returned to Nottingham Forest after his loan deal was cut short. Later the same day, Motherwell announced the signing of Eythor Bjørgolfsson from Umeå to a two-and-a-half-year contract.

On 30 January, Motherwell announced the departure of Filip Stuparević after his contract was ended by mutual agreement, and that Jack McConnell had joined Cowdenbeath on a co-operation loan deal.

=== February ===
On 2 February, transfer deadline day, Motherwell announced the return of Stephen Welsh on loan from Celtic for the remainder of the season.

On 4 February, Motherwell's trip to Dundee, scheduled for 19:45 later the same day, was postponed due to a waterlogged pitch at Dens Park.

On 7 February, Motherwell's Fifth round Scottish Cup tie against Aberdeen at Pittodrie on 8 February, was postponed due to a waterlogged pitch with the game being rescheduled for 19:45 on 18 February 2026. Later the same day, Jay Gillies joined Cumbernauld Colts on loan until the end of the season.

On 10 February, Apostolos Stamatelopoulos joined Sydney FC on loan for the remainder of the season, with an option to make the move permanent.

On 16 February, Motherwell announced that they had extended their contract with Matthew Connelly until the summer of 2027, with the club holding an option to extended it again by an additional year.

On 24 February, Motherwell announced that Aston Oxborough had joined Dunfermline Athletic on loan for the remainder of the season.

=== March ===
On 9 March, Motherwell announced that Aston Oxborough had returned to the club from his loan deal with Dunfermline Athletic after Matthew Connelly suffered an injury in training, Oxborough scheduled to return to Dunfermline once Connelly had recovered from his injury. On 18 March, Oxborough returned to Dunfermline Athletic on loan for the remainder of the season after Connelly had recovered from his injury.

On 26 March, Callum Slattery was handed a four-match suspension, two of which were suspended, after a SFA hearing found the player to have simulated contract to the face which resulted in Richard King being sentoff during Moterwell's 5-0 victory at St Mirren on 21 February.

=== April ===
On 3 April, Motherwell announced that they had extended their contract with John Koutroumbis until the summer of 2028.

=== May ===
On 8 May, Andy Halliday announced that his retirement from football at the end of the season when his contract with Motherwell expires.

On 14 May, Motherwell announced that Aston Oxborough had been again temporarily recalled from his loan with Dunfermline Athletic for their final Premiership fixture against Hibernian.

On 17 May, Motherwell announced that Sam Nicholson would be joining Livingston once his contract expired at the end of the season.

On 19 May, Motherwell announced that Callum Slattery would be leaving the club after five season, when his contract expired at the end of the season, and that Lukas Fadinger had signed a one-year contract extension that will see him remain at the club until 2028.

On 20 May, Motherwell released their retained and released list, confirming the departures Kofi Balmer, Dylan Wells, Zach Robinson, Colbi McQuarrie, Scott Williamson, Jay Gillies, Arran Clark, Andrew Arnott, Campbell Forrest, Rocco McColm, Harry McLean, Nathan Lawson, Evan Samuel and Olivier Wieczorek alongside the already announced Callum Slattery, Sam Nicholson and retiring Andy Halliday. Motherwell also announced that they were in discussions with Liam Gordon and Zander McAllister over contract extensions whilst Olly Whyte, Jack McConnell, Jon Joe Friel and Mikey Booth had all agreed new contracts.

On 21 May, Motherwell announced that Jens Berthel Askou had left the club to take up the position of Head Coach at Toulouse.

== Squad ==
As of match played 16 May 2026

No.	Name	Nationality	Position	Date of birth (age)	Signed from	Signed in	Contract ends	Apps.	Goals
Goalkeepers
1	Aston Oxborough	(England)	GK	9 May 1998 (aged 28)	Unattached	2022	2027(+1)	32	0
13	Calum Ward	(England)	GK	17 October 2000 (aged 25)	Unattached	2025	2027 (+1)	42	0
31	Matthew Connelly	(Scotland)	GK	2 March 2003 (aged 23)	Academy	2019	2027 (+1)	5	0
Defenders
2	Stephen O'Donnell	(Scotland)	DF	11 May 1992 (aged 34)	Kilmarnock	2020	2027	226	6
4	Liam Gordon	(Scotland)	DF	26 January 1996 (aged 30)	St Johnstone	2024	2026	57	2
6	Jordan McGhee	(Scotland)	DF	24 July 1996 (aged 29)	Unattached	2025	2027(+1)	8	0
16	Paul McGinn	(Scotland)	DF	22 October 1990 (aged 35)	Hibernian	2022	2027	130	2
22	John Koutroumbis	(Australia)	DF	6 March 1998 (aged 28)	Unattached	2024	2028	40	1
45	Emmanuel Longelo	(England)	DF	27 December 2000 (aged 25)	Birmingham City	2025	2027	44	9
57	Stephen Welsh	(Scotland)	DF	19 January 2000 (aged 26)	on loan from Celtic	2026	2026	29	1
Midfielders
7	Tom Sparrow	(Wales)	MF	6 December 2002 (aged 23)	Unattached	2024	2027 (+1)	73	6
8	Callum Slattery	(England)	MF	8 February 1999 (aged 27)	Southampton	2021	2026	148	18
11	Andy Halliday	(Scotland)	MF	11 October 1991 (aged 34)	Heart of Midlothian	2024	2026	67	5
12	Lukas Fadinger	(Austria)	MF	27 September 2000 (aged 25)	Rheindorf Altach	2025	2028	43	5
20	Elliot Watt	(Scotland)	MF	11 March 2000 (aged 26)	Burton Albion	2025	2027(+1)	42	6
21	Elijah Just	(New Zealand)	MF	1 May 2000 (aged 26)	AC Horsens	2025	2027(+1)	43	7
25	Oscar Priestman	(Australia)	MF	25 March 2003 (aged 23)	Western Sydney Wanderers	2025	2028	31	0
Forwards
14	Zach Robinson	(England)	FW	11 June 2002 (aged 23)	Unattached	2024	2026	19	2
15	Eythor Bjørgolfsson	(Norway)	FW	25 August 2000 (aged 25)	Umeå	2026	2028	10	1
18	Tawanda Maswanhise	(Zimbabwe)	FW	20 November 2002 (aged 23)	Unattached	2024	2027(+1)	78	28
19	Sam Nicholson	(Scotland)	FW	20 January 1995 (aged 31)	Colorado Rapids	2024	2026	37	2
28	Luca Ross	(Scotland)	FW	11 August 2006 (aged 19)	Academy	2022	2027	18	1
66	Callum Hendry	(Scotland)	FW	8 December 1997 (aged 28)	Milton Keynes Dons	2025	2027 (+1)	22	1
77	Regan Charles-Cook	(Grenada)	FW	14 February 1997 (aged 29)	Eupen	2025	2027	27	1
90	Ibrahim Said	(Nigeria)	FW	15 June 2002 (aged 23)	Viborg	2025	2027 (+1)	45	3
Development team
29	Mikey Booth	(Scotland)	MF	2 January 2007 (aged 19)	Academy	2023		0	0
33	Andrew Arnott	(Scotland)	DF	7 May 2008 (aged 18)	Academy	2024		0	0
34	Harry McLean	(Scotland)	FW	19 June 2008 (aged 17)	Academy	2024		0	0
35	Jon-Joe Friel	(Scotland)	DF	2 February 2008 (aged 18)	Academy	2024		0	0
39	Zander McAllister	(Scotland)	MF	22 April 2008 (aged 18)	Academy	2024		4	0
42	Rocco McColm	(Scotland)	MF	29 September 2008 (aged 17)	Academy	2024		1	0
52	Arran Clark	(Scotland)	MF	26 December 2008 (age 16)	Academy	2025		0	0
53	Blane Watson	(Scotland)	MF	5 August 2009 (aged 16)	Academy	2025		0	0
61	Colbi McQuarrie	(Scotland)	GK	23 January 2007 (aged 19)	Academy	2025		0	0
	Aiden Tearney	(Scotland)	DF	2 May 2009 (aged 17)	Academy	2025		0	0
	Jack Dalziel	(Scotland)	DF	8 March 2009 (aged 17)	Academy	2025		0	0
	Aaron Thomson	(Scotland)	DF	26 March 2009 (aged 17)	Academy	2025		0	0
	Lucas Weir	(Scotland)	FW	30 June 2009 (aged 16)	Academy	2025		0	0
	Robbie Hunter	(Scotland)	FW	29 October 2009 (aged 16)	Academy	2025		0	0
	Aaron Buchanan	(Scotland)	MF	2 June 2009 (aged 16)	Academy	2025		0	0
	Evan Samuel	(Scotland)	FW	30 April 2009 (aged 17)	Academy	2025		0	0
	Olivier Wieczorek	(Scotland)	FW	6 March 2009 (aged 17)	Academy	2025		0	0
Away on loan
5	Kofi Balmer	(Northern Ireland)	DF	19 September 2000 (aged 25)	Unattached	2024	2026 (+1)	33	1
9	Apostolos Stamatelopoulos	(Australia)	FW	9 April 1999 (aged 27)	Newcastle Jets	2024	2027	45	12
23	Ewan Wilson	(Scotland)	DF	19 November 2004 (aged 21)	Academy	2021	2027 (+1)	45	1
26	Olly Whyte	(Scotland)	MF	27 November 2006 (aged 19)	Academy	2023		0	0
27	Dylan Wells	(Scotland)	MF	20 March 2006 (aged 20)	Academy	2022	2026	6	0
30	Campbell Forrest	(Scotland)	MF	10 October 2007 (aged 18)	Academy	2023		0	0
32	Scott Williamson	(Scotland)	DF	12 March 2007 (aged 19)	Academy	2023		0	0
36	Jay Gillies	(Scotland)	DF	5 February 2008 (aged 18)	Academy	2024		0	0
37	Nathan Lawson	(Scotland)	FW	24 February 2008 (aged 18)	Academy	2024		0	0
41	Jack McConnell	(Scotland)	GK	20 June 2008 (aged 17)	Academy	2024		0	0
Left during the season
15	Eseosa Sule	(Scotland)	FW	1 April 2006 (aged 20)	on loan from West Bromwich Albion	2025	2026	3	0
17	Filip Stuparević	(Serbia)	FW	30 August 2000 (aged 25)	Unattached	2024	2026	4	1
24	Esapa Osong	(England)	FW	21 September 2004 (aged 21)	on loan from Nottingham Forest	2025	2026	10	0
38	Lennon Miller	(Scotland)	MF	25 August 2006 (aged 19)	Academy	2022	2026	76	6
	Kali Fraser-Traljic	(Scotland)	FW	16 May 2009 (age 17)	Academy	2025		0	0

== Transfers ==
For those players sold, released or contract ended before the start of this season, see 2024–25 Motherwell F.C. season.

=== In ===
Date	Position	Nationality	Name	From	Fee	Ref
27 May 2025 (Note: Transfer announced on the shown date, becoming official on 1 July 2025.)	MF	(Austria)	Lukas Fadinger	Rheindorf Altach	Free	
2 June 2025	DF	(Scotland)	Jordan McGhee	Unattached	Free	
26 June 2025	MF	(Scotland)	Elliot Watt	Burton Albion	Free	
9 July 2025	MF	(New Zealand)	Elijah Just	AC Horsens	Undisclosed	
10 July 2025	DF	(England)	Emmanuel Longelo	Birmingham City	Undisclosed	
11 July 2025	FW	(Nigeria)	Ibrahim Said	Viborg	Undisclosed	
18 August 2025	FW	(Scotland)	Callum Hendry	Milton Keynes Dons	Undisclosed	
22 August 2025	FW	(Grenada)	Regan Charles-Cook	Eupen	Undisclosed	
26 August 2025	MF	(Australia)	Oscar Priestman	Western Sydney Wanderers	Undisclosed	
19 January 2026	FW	(Norway)	Eythor Bjørgolfsson	Umeå	Undisclosed	

=== Loans in ===
Date from	Position	Nationality	Name	From	Date to	Ref.
7 July 2025	FW	(Scotland)	Eseosa Sule	West Bromwich Albion	1 January 2026	
15 August 2025	FW	(England)	Esapa Osong	Nottingham Forest	19 January 2026	
1 September 2025	DF	(Scotland)	Stephen Welsh	Celtic	12 January 2026	
2 February 2026	DF	(Scotland)	Stephen Welsh	Celtic	End of season	

=== Out ===
Date	Position	Nationality	Name	To	Fee	Ref.
12 August 2025	MF	(Scotland)	Lennon Miller	Udinese	Undisclosed	

=== Loans out ===
Date from	Position	Nationality	Name	To	Date to	Ref.
5 August 2025	DF	(Scotland)	Scott Williamson	Cowdenbeath	Co-Operation Loan	
5 August 2025	FW	(Scotland)	Nathan Lawson	Cowdenbeath	Co-Operation Loan	
7 August 2025	MF	(Scotland)	Olly Whyte	Stenhousemuir	Co-Operation Loan	
7 August 2025	GK	(Scotland)	Matthew Connelly	Airdrieonians	27 October 2025	
29 August 2025	DF	(Scotland)	Ewan Wilson	Raith Rovers	31 May 2026	
19 December 2025	GK	(Scotland)	Colbi Mcquarrie	Stenhousemuir	26 December 2025	
12 January 2026	DF	(Northern Ireland)	Kofi Balmer	Bristol Rovers	31 May 2026	
15 January 2026	MF	(Scotland)	Dylan Wells	Stirling Albion	31 May 2026	
30 January 2026	GK	(Scotland)	Jack McConnell	Cowdenbeath	Co-Operation Loan	
7 February 2026	DF	(Scotland)	Jay Gillies	Cumbernauld Colts	31 May 2026	
10 February 2026	FW	(Australia)	Apostolos Stamatelopoulos	Sydney FC	31 May 2026	
24 February 2026	GK	(England)	Aston Oxborough	Dunfermline Athletic	9 March 2026	
18 March 2026	GK	(England)	Aston Oxborough	Dunfermline Athletic	15 May 2026	
17 May 2026	GK	(England)	Aston Oxborough	Dunfermline Athletic	31 May 2026	

=== Released ===
Date	Position	Nationality	Name	Joined	Date	Ref.
16 June 2025	DF	(England)	Steve Seddon	AFC Wimbledon	24 June 2025	
16 June 2025	MF	(Canada)	Harry Paton	Forge FC	19 September 2025	
16 June 2025	MF	(North Macedonia)	Davor Zdravkovski	AEL Limassol	14 August 2025	
16 June 2025	FW	(Nigeria)	Moses Ebiye	HB Tórshavn	11 April 2026	
30 January 2025	FW	(Serbia)	Filip Stuparević	ÍBV	3 April 2026	
31 May 2025	GK	(Scotland)	Colbi McQuarrie			
31 May 2025	DF	(Northern Ireland)	Kofi Balmer	Bristol Rovers	1 July 2026	
31 May 2025	DF	(Scotland)	Andrew Arnott	Carluke Rovers	1 August 2026	
31 May 2025	DF	(Scotland)	Jay Gillies	Auchinleck Talbot	27 July 2026	
31 May 2025	DF	(Scotland)	Scott Williamson			
31 May 2025	DF	(Scotland)	Liam Gordon	Gillingham	19 June 2026	
31 May 2025	MF	(England)	Callum Slattery	Sheffield Wednesday	1 July 2026	
31 May 2025	MF	(Scotland)	Arran Clark	St Johnstone	1 July 2026	
31 May 2025	MF	(Scotland)	Campbell Forrest	Bo'ness United	2 October 2026	
31 May 2025	MF	(Scotland)	Andy Halliday	Retirement		
31 May 2025	MF	(Scotland)	Rocco McColm	Queen of the South	29 September 2026	
31 May 2025	MF	(Scotland)	Dylan Wells	Linfield	15 June 2026	
31 May 2025	FW	(England)	Zach Robinson	Greenock Morton	17 September 2026	
31 May 2025	FW	(Scotland)	Nathan Lawson	East Kilbride	11 August 2026	
31 May 2025	FW	(Scotland)	Harry McLean	MC Choctaws	6 July 2026	
31 May 2025	FW	(Scotland)	Sam Nicholson	Livingston	1 June 2026	
31 May 2025	FW	(Scotland)	Evan Samuel	Stirling Albion		
31 May 2025	FW	(Scotland)	Olivier Wieczorek			

== Friendlies ==
1 July 2025	Twente	3–0	Motherwell	Beckum, Netherlands
18:00 BST (UTC+1)		Report	van Wolfswinkel 12'; Ünüvar 73', 90'	Stadium: Sportpark De Kruudnhof

8 July 2025	Motherwell	1–0	Carlisle United	Motherwell
15:00 BST (UTC+1)	Halliday 74' (pen.)	Report		Stadium: Fir Park; Attendance: 0
Note: Match played behind closed doors.

25 July 2025	Motherwell	1–1	Hertha Berlin	Motherwell
19:00 BST (UTC+1)	(yellow card) 23'; Stamatelopoulos 83'	Report	Reese 10' (pen.)	Stadium: Fir Park

== Competitions ==
=== Overview ===
Competition	First match	Last match	Starting round	Final position	Record							
Competition	First match	Last match	Starting round	Final position	Pld	W	D	L	GF	GA	GD	Win %
Premiership	2 August 2025	16 May 2026	Matchday 1	4th	38	16	13	9	59	36	+23	42.11
Scottish Cup	17 January 2026	18 February 2026	Fourth round	Fifth round	2	1	0	1	1	2	−1	50.00
League Cup	12 July 2025	1 November 2025	Group Stage	Semi-final	7	5	1	1	11	7	+4	71.43
Total					47	22	14	11	71	45	+26	46.81

Last updated: 16 May 2026
Source: Soccerway

=== Premiership ===
==== League table ====
Pos	Team	Pld	W	D	L	GF	GA	GD	Pts	Qualification or relegation (Note: Teams played each other three times (33 matches), before the league was split into two groups (the top six and the bottom six).)
2	Heart of Midlothian	38	24	8	6	67	34	+33	80	Qualification for the Champions League second qualifying round
3	Rangers	38	20	12	6	76	43	+33	72	Qualification for the Europa League third qualifying round (Note: Since the 2025–26 Scottish Cup winners, Celtic, qualified for the Champions League via league position, the spot reserved for the cup winners (Europa League third qualifying round) was passed to the third-placed team, and the spots for the Conference League second qualifying round were moved down one league position.)
4	Motherwell	38	16	13	9	59	36	+23	61	Qualification for the Conference League second qualifying round
5	Hibernian	38	15	12	11	58	44	+14	57	Qualification for the Conference League second qualifying round
6	Falkirk	38	14	7	17	50	62	−12	49	

Rules for classification: 1) Points; 2) Goal difference; 3) Goals scored; 4) Head-to-head points; 5) Head-to-head goal difference; 6) Play-off (only if deciding champion, UEFA competition qualification, second stage group allocation, or relegation).

==== Results summary ====
Overall								Home						Away					
Pld	W	D	L	GF	GA	GD	Pts	W	D	L	GF	GA	GD	W	D	L	GF	GA	GD
38	16	13	9	59	36	+23	61	10	6	3	32	13	+19	6	7	6	27	23	+4

Last updated: 16 May 2026.
Source: SPFL

==== Results ====
On 20 June, the fixture list was released, with Motherwell starting their campaign at home to Rangers on 2 August, with their last game of the first phase being scheduled for 11 April away to Heart of Midlothian. On 7 April, Motherwell's post split fixtures were announced, starting with an away fixture against Rangers on 26 April and ending with an away fixture against Hibernian on 16 May.

2 August 2025 1	Motherwell	1–1	Rangers	Motherwell
17:30 BST (UTC+1)	Watt (yellow card) 60'; Longelo 87'	Report	Tavernier 14', (yellow card) 90+2'; Cameron (yellow card) 64'; Dowell (yellow card) 84'; Aarons (yellow card) 90'	Stadium: Fir Park; Attendance: 10,616; Referee: Steven McLean

9 August 2025 2	St Mirren	0–0	Motherwell	Paisley
15:00 BST (UTC+1)	Gogić (yellow card) 25'; Richardson (yellow card) 45+2'; Fraser (yellow card) 63'; Baccus (yellow card) 72'; Phillips (yellow card) 86'	Report	McGinn (yellow card) 86'	Stadium: St Mirren Park; Attendance: 6,735; Referee: Ross Hardie

23 August 2025 3	Heart of Midlothian	3–3	Motherwell	Edinburgh
15:00 BST (UTC+1)	Halkett (yellow card) 35'; McEntee (yellow card) 45'; Milne (yellow card) 58', (goal) 65'; Braga 74', 83'	Report	Slattery 21', (yellow card) 24'; Maswanhise 49'; Longelo 62'; Hendry (yellow card) 78'	Stadium: Tynecastle Park; Attendance: 18,712; Referee: John Beaton

30 August 2025 4	Motherwell	2–2	Kilmarnock	Motherwell
15:00 BST (UTC+1)	Watt (yellow card) 43'; Maswanhise 45+1'; Longelo 62'; Gordon (yellow card) 90+4'	Report	Daniels 19', (yellow card) 27'; Lyons (yellow card) 44'; Deas (yellow card) 52'; Stanger 81'; Magennis (yellow card) 84'; Dackers (yellow card) 90+3'	Stadium: Fir Park; Attendance: 6,230; Referee: Dan McFarlane

13 September 2025 5	Dundee	1–1	Motherwell	Dundee
15:00 BST (UTC+1)	Westley (yellow card) 25'; Graham 48'; Dhanda (red card) 85'	Report	Maswanhise 33'; Longelo (yellow card) 89'	Stadium: Dens Park; Attendance: 4,572; Referee: Calum Scott

27 September 2025 6	Motherwell	2–0	Aberdeen	Motherwell
17:45 BST (UTC+1)	Koutroumbis 90+2'; Stamatelopoulos 90+7' (pen.)	Report	Knoester (yellow card) 33'; Tobers (yellow card) 55'; Palaversa (yellow card) 72'	Stadium: Fir Park; Attendance: 7,195; Referee: Ryan Lee
Note: Match shown live on Premier Sports 1.

5 October 2025 7	Celtic	3–2	Motherwell	Glasgow
15:00 BST (UTC+1)	Iheanacho 28' (pen.); Nygren 69'; Engels (yellow card) 72'; Maeda 90+2', (yellow card) 90+8'	Report	Stamatelopoulos 40', 56' (pen.)	Stadium: Celtic Park; Attendance: 58,563; Referee: Calum Scott

18 October 2025 8	Motherwell	1–2	Falkirk	Motherwell
15:00 BST (UTC+1)	Maswanhise 22'; Watt (yellow card) 45+1'	Report	Adams (yellow card) 39'; Miller (yellow card) 45', (goal) 57'; Hart (yellow card) 45+4'; Arfield 79'; Tait (yellow card) 90+1'; Cartwright (yellow card) 90+3'	Stadium: Fir Park; Attendance: 7,473; Referee: Steven McLean

25 October 2025 9	Livingston	1–2	Motherwell	Livingston
15:00 BST (UTC+1)	Bokila 26' (pen.); Pittman (yellow card) 67'; Prior (yellow card) 87'	Report	Gordon (yellow card) 47'; Stamatelopoulos 59' (pen.); O'Donnell (yellow card) 84'; Just 90+3'	Stadium: Almondvale Stadium; Referee: Nick Walsh

29 October 2025 10	Motherwell	2–0	Dundee United	Motherwell
19:45 GMT (UTC)	Maswanhise 42'; Hendry (yellow card) 63'; Watt 77'	Report	Keresztes (yellow card) 32'; Sibbald (yellow card) 37'	Stadium: Fir Park; Attendance: 6,446; Referee: Chris Graham

9 November 2025 12	Aberdeen	1–1	Motherwell	Aberdeen
15:00 GMT (UTC)	Gyamfi (yellow card) 16'; Lobban (yellow card) 54'; Karlsson 61'; Shinnie (yellow card) 81'	Report	Watt (yellow card) 51'; Just 64'	Stadium: Pittodrie Stadium; Attendance: 17,843; Referee: Steven McLean

22 November 2025 13	Kilmarnock	1–3	Motherwelll	Kilmarnock
15:00 GMT (UTC)	Lowery (yellow card) 3'; Tiffoney 49'	Report	Maswanhise 16', 26'; Koutroumbis (yellow card) 21'; Hendry (yellow card) 45+2'; Slattery (yellow card) 57'; Stamatelopoulos 68' (pen.), (yellow card) 80'; Gordon (yellow card) 81'	Stadium: Rugby Park; Attendance: 5,100; Referee: Ryan Lee

25 November 2025 11	Motherwell	2–0	Hibernian	Motherwell
19:45 GMT (UTC)	Maswanhise 19' (pen.); Just 22'	Report	Hanley (red card) 34'; McGrath (yellow card) 38'	Stadium: Fir Park; Attendance: 6,585; Referee: Duncan Nicolson

29 November 2025 14	Motherwell	0–0	Heart of Midlothian	Motherwell
15:00 GMT (UTC)	Longelo (yellow card) 73'; Welsh (yellow card) 88'	Report	Shankland (yellow card) 23'; Kyziridis (yellow card) 28'; Devlin (yellow card) 81'; Borchgrevink (yellow card) 90'	Stadium: Fir Park; Attendance: 10,938; Referee: Kevin Clancy

3 December 2025 15	Falkirk	0–0	Motherwell	Falkirk
19:45 GMT (UTC)	Ross (yellow card) 66'; Lissah (yellow card) 77'	Report		Stadium: Falkirk Stadium; Attendance: 7,490; Referee: Chris Graham

6 December 2025 16	Motherwell	3–0	Livingston	Motherwell
15:00 GMT (UTC)	Watt 18'; Charles-Cook (yellow card) 39'; Stamatelopoulos 60' (pen.); Longelo 88'	Report	Pittman (yellow card) 40'; Montaño (yellow card) 56'; McGowan (yellow card) 86'	Stadium: Fir Park; Attendance: 5,683; Referee: Ryan Lee

13 December 2025 17	Dundee United	0–0	Motherwell	Dundee
15:00 GMT (UTC)	Stephenson (yellow card) 46'; Ferry (yellow card) 67'; Ševelj (yellow card) 90'	Report	Maswanhise (yellow card) 34'; Slattery (yellow card) 75'; Watt (yellow card) 85'	Stadium: Tannadice Park; Attendance: 8,350; Referee: Duncan Nicolson

20 December 2025 18	Motherwell	1–0	Dundee	Motherwell
15:00 GMT (UTC)	Slattery (yellow card) 32', (goal) 82'	Report	Digby (yellow card) 46'; Dhanda (yellow card) 73'	Stadium: Fir Park; Attendance: 6,649; Referee: Matthew MacDermid

27 December 2025 19	Rangers	1–0	Motherwell	Glasgow
15:00 GMT (UTC)	Aasgaard 67', (yellow card) 80'; Barron (yellow card) 78'; Souttar (yellow card) 90'	Report	McGinn (yellow card) 86'	Stadium: Ibrox Stadium; Attendance: 50,828; Referee: David Dickinson

30 December 2025 20	Motherwell	2–0	Celtic	Motherwell
20:00 GMT (UTC)	Said 14'; Watt 58'	Report	Trusty (yellow card) 52'; Hatate (yellow card) 56'; Ralston (yellow card) 56'; Scales (yellow card) 74'	Stadium: Fir Park; Attendance: 11,435; Referee: Kevin Clancy

3 January 2026 21	Motherwell	2–0	St Mirren	Motherwell
15:00 GMT (UTC)	Maswanhise 35'; Watt 57'	Report	King (yellow card) 43'; Freckleton (yellow card) 45'; Nlundulu (yellow card) 45+1'; Gogić (yellow card) 66'	Stadium: Fir Park; Attendance: 7,934; Referee: Calum Scott

10 January 2026 22	Hibernian	1–1	Motherwell	Edinburgh
15:00 GMT (UTC)	Mulligan (yellow card) 32'; Obita (yellow card) 47'; Bowie 69'	Report	Welsh (yellow card) 34'; Fadinger (yellow card) 45+1'; Maswanhise 52'; Priestman (yellow card) 73'; Longelo (yellow card) 80'; Said (yellow card) 87'	Stadium: Easter Road; Attendance: 19,246; Referee: Matthew MacDermid

24 January 2026 23	Motherwell	4–0	Kilmarnock	Motherwell
15:00 GMT (UTC)	Just 29'; Maswanhise 45+1'; Said 56'; Fadinger 82'	Report	Lowery (yellow card) 18' (yellow-red card) 45'	Stadium: Fir Park; Attendance: 6,243; Referee: Nick Walsh

31 January 2026 24	Livingston	0–2	Motherwell	Livingston
15:00 GMT (UTC)	Sylla (yellow card) 89'	Report	Maswanhise 5', 28'	Stadium: Almondvale Stadium; Attendance: 2,785; Referee: Steven McLean

11 February 2026 26	Motherwell	1–1	Rangers	Motherwell
20:00 GMT (UTC)	Said (yellow card) 56'; Just (yellow card) 63'; Fadinger (red card) 78'; Welsh 89'	Report	Raskin 6', (yellow card) 43'; Diomande (yellow card) 14'; Meghoma (yellow card) 75'; Souttar (yellow card) 80'; Miovski (yellow card) 87'	Stadium: Fir Park; Attendance: 9,845; Referee: Steven McLean

15 February 2026 27	Motherwell	2–0	Aberdeen	Motherwell
14:30 GMT (UTC)	Slattery (yellow card) 23'; Just 28'; McIntyre 90+3' (o.g.)	Report	Morrison (yellow card) 32'; McIntyre (yellow card) 37'; Geiger (yellow card) 52'; Keskinen (yellow card) 67'; Cameron (yellow card) 72'; Palaversa (yellow card) 90+2'	Stadium: Fir Park; Attendance: 7,464; Referee: David Dickinson

21 February 2026 28	St Mirren	0–5	Motherwell	Paisley
19:30 GMT (UTC)	Phillips (yellow card) 4'; Gogić (yellow card) 41'; King (red card) 52'; Freckleton (yellow card) 87'; Baccus (yellow card) 90+2'	Report	Just 14'; Maswanhise 30' (pen.); Said 49'; Longelo 58'; Bjørgolfsson 66'	Stadium: St Mirren Park; Attendance: 6,758; Referee: Calum Scott

28 February 2026 29	Motherwell	2–0	Dundee United	Motherwell
15:00 GMT (UTC)	Maswanhise 37' (pen.), 46'; Said (yellow card) 57'; Fadinger (yellow card) 63'	Report	Farrugia (yellow card) 13'; Ševelj (yellow card) 36'; Iovu (yellow card) 45+1'	Stadium: Fir Park; Attendance: 8,054; Referee: Nick Walsh

7 March 2026 25	Dundee	2–1	Motherwell	Dundee
15:00 GMT (UTC)	Yogane 32'; Graham (yellow card) 48'; Robertson (yellow card) 70', (goal) 84'; Hamilton (yellow card) 80'; Congreve (yellow card) 90+2'	Report	Said (yellow card) 35'; Slattery 78'; McGinn (yellow card) 90+2'	Stadium: Dens Park; Attendance: 6,304; Referee: Dan McFarlane
Note: Match originally scheduled for 4 February but postponed due to a waterlogged pitch.

14 March 2026 30	Celtic	3–1	Motherwell	Glasgow
15:00 GMT (UTC)	Oxlade-Chamberlain (yellow card) 7'; Yang 38', 79'; Donovan (yellow card) 50'; Hatate (yellow card) 63'; Čvančara 72' (pen.); Ralston (yellow card) 82'	Report	Just 32', (yellow card) 64'; Longelo (red card) 71'; Ward (yellow card) 72'	Stadium: Celtic Park; Referee: John Beaton

21 March 2026 31	Motherwell	0–0	Hibernian	Motherwell
15:00 GMT (UTC)	Watt (yellow card) 65'; Sparrow (yellow card) 76'; Bjørgolfsson (yellow card) 90+5'	Report	McGrath (yellow card) 30'; Barlaser (yellow card) 44'; Šuto (yellow card) 60'; Chaiwa (yellow card) 69'	Stadium: Fir Park; Attendance: 9,371; Referee: David Dickinson

4 April 2026 32	Motherwell	2–3	Falkirk	Motherwell
15:00 BST (UTC+1)	Sparrow (yellow card) 25'; Watt 34'; Said (yellow card) 61'; Maswanhise 90+4'	Report	Stewart 3'; Henderson (yellow card) 42'; Broggio 45'; Adams (yellow card) 56'; Miller 62' (pen.); Spencer (yellow card) 85'	Stadium: Fir Park; Attendance: 8,244; Referee: Duncan Nicolson

11 April 2026 33	Heart of Midlothian	3–1	Motherwell	Edinburgh
15:00 BST (UTC+1)	Braga 61'; Shankland 87' (pen.); Kaboré 90+2', (yellow card) 90+3'	Report	McGinn (yellow card) 19'; Longelo 50'; Said (yellow card) 82'	Stadium: Tynecastle Park; Attendance: 18,800; Referee: Matthew MacDermid

26 April 2026 34	Rangers	2–3	Motherwell	Glasgow
15:00 BST (UTC+1)	Chermiti 51'; Raskin 70'; Sterling (yellow card) 71'	Report	Fadinger 16'; Longelo 25', 90', (yellow card) 33'; Slattery (yellow card) 71'	Stadium: Ibrox Stadium; Attendance: 50,970; Referee: Kevin Clancy

2 May 2026 35	Falkirk	1–0	Motherwell	Falkirk
15:00 BST (UTC+1)	Broggio (yellow card) 28'; Spencer (yellow card) 29'; Tait (yellow card) 55'; Cartwright 63'; Yeats (yellow card) 75'	Report	Sparrow (yellow card) 35'; Slattery (yellow card) 50'; Longelo (yellow card) 88'; Hendry (yellow card) 90+1'; Just (yellow card) 90+2'	Stadium: Falkirk Stadium; Attendance: 7,566; Referee: Dan McFarlane

9 May 2026 36	Motherwell	1–1	Heart of Midlothian	Motherwell
20:00 BST (UTC+1)	Just (yellow card) 15'; Kingsley 25' (o.g.)	Report	Shankland 43'; Steinwender (yellow card) 47'; Altena (yellow card) 58'; Findlay (yellow card) 79'	Stadium: Fir Park; Attendance: 12,306; Referee: Steven McLean

13 May 2026 37	Motherwell	2–3	Celtic	Motherwell
20:00 BST (UTC+1)	Watt 17'; Gordon 85'; Nicholson (yellow card) 90+1'; Longelo (yellow card) 90+8'	Report	Maeda 41', (yellow card) 61'; Nygren 58'; Scales (yellow card) 90+1'; Iheanacho 90+9' (pen.), (yellow card) 90+10'	Stadium: Fir Park; Referee: John Beaton

16 May 2026 38	Hibernian	0–1	Motherwell	Edinburgh
12:30 BST (UTC+1)	McGrath (yellow card) 45+3'; Mulligan (yellow card) 53'; Chaiwa (yellow card) 71'; Boyle (yellow card) 84'; Cadden (yellow card) 89'	Report	Watt (yellow card) 32' (yellow-red card) 67'; Fadinger 35' (yellow card) 74'; Charles-Cook (yellow card) 53'; Slattery (yellow card) 66'	Stadium: Easter Road; Attendance: 19,014; Referee: Nick Walsh

=== Scottish Cup ===
17 January 2026 Fourth round	Motherwell	1–0	Ross County	Motherwell
15:00 GMT (UTC)	Maswanhise 62'	Report	Randall (yellow card) 39'; Lindsay (yellow card) 43'; Cornelius (yellow card) 73'; Smith (yellow card) 75'; O'Sullivan (yellow card) 86'	Stadium: Fir Park; Attendance: 5,547; Referee: Don Robertson

18 February 2026 Fifth round	Aberdeen	2–0	Motherwell	Aberdeen
19:45 GMT (UTC)	Nisbet 4'; Milanovic (yellow card) 18'; Geiger (red card) 23'; Keskinen (yellow card) 40'; Shinnie 63'; Palaversa (yellow card) 72'	Report	Priestman (red card) 3'; Gordon (red card) 48'; O'Donnell (yellow card) 63'; Slattery (yellow card) 66'	Stadium: Pittodrie Stadium; Attendance: 9,744; Referee: John Beaton
Note: Match to be shown live on Premier Sports 1. Match originally scheduled for 7 February, but postponed on the day due to a waterlogged pitch and rescheduled for 18 February at 19:45.

=== League Cup ===
==== Group stage ====
Pos	Team	Pld	W	PW	PL	L	GF	GA	GD	Pts	Qualification	MOT	GMO	CLY	STE	PET
1	Motherwell	4	3	1	0	0	8	3	+5	11	Qualification for the second round	—	3–0	—	—	2–1
2	Greenock Morton	4	3	0	0	1	10	5	+5	9	Qualification for the second round	—	—	3–0	3–0	—
3	Clyde	4	1	1	1	1	6	8	−2	6		2–2p	—	—	p2–2	—
4	Stenhousemuir	4	1	0	1	2	3	6	−3	4		0–1	—	—	—	1–0
5	Peterhead	4	0	0	0	4	4	9	−5	0		—	2–4	1–2	—	—

Rules for classification: 1) goal difference, 2) goals scored, 3) away goals scored, 4) matches won, 5) away matches won, 6) drawing of lots.

12 July 2025 1	Clyde	2–2 (4–5 p)	Motherwell	Hamilton
15:00 BST (UTC+1)	Hilton 16'; Lyon (yellow card) 37', (goal) 53'	Report	Maswanhise 21', 48'	Stadium: New Douglas Park; Attendance: 1,931; Referee: Matthew MacDermid
	Penalties
	Robson (penalty scored); Leitch (penalty scored); Nevans (penalty scored); Fleming (penalty scored); Dunachie (penalty missed)		(penalty scored) Halliday; (penalty scored) Slattery; (penalty scored) Just; (penalty scored) Sule; (penalty scored) Sparrow
Note: Match streamed live on Premier Sports.

15 July 2025 2	Motherwell	2–1	Peterhead	Motherwell
19:45 BST (UTC+1)	Longelo 28'; Slattery (yellow card) 32'; Fadinger 90+1'	Report	Jac. Brown 9'; McGuffie (yellow card) 80'; Forrest (yellow card) 89'	Stadium: Fir Park; Attendance: 2,657; Referee: Don Robertson
Note: Match streamed live on Premier Sports.

19 July 2025 3	Stenhousemuir	0–1	Motherwell	Stenhousemuir
15:00 BST (UTC+1)	Taylor (yellow card) 22'	Report	O'Donnell 41'	Stadium: Ochilview Park; Attendance: 1,394; Referee: Lloyd Wilson
Note: Match streamed live on Premier Sports.

22 July 2025 4	Motherwell	3–0	Greenock Morton	Motherwell
19:45 BST (UTC+1)	Slattery (yellow card) 34'; Stamatelopoulos 52'; Maswanhise 83', 90+3'	Report	Longridge (yellow card) 21'; Moffat (yellow card) 29'	Stadium: Fir Park; Attendance: 3,255; Referee: Ryan Lee
Note: Match shown live on Premier Sports 1.

==== Knockout phase ====
16 August 2025 Second round	St Johnstone	0–1 (a.e.t.)	Motherwell	Perth
15:00 BST (UTC+1)	Diabate (yellow card) 13'; Gullan (yellow card) 26'; Sprangler (yellow card) 41'; McPake (yellow card) 72'; Boyes (yellow card) 97'	Report	O'Donnell (yellow card) 50'; Fadinger 109'	Stadium: McDiarmid Park; Attendance: 4,330; Referee: David Dickinson
Note: Match streamed live on Premier Sports.

20 September 2025 Quarter-finals	Aberdeen	0–1	Motherwell	Aberdeen
15:00 BST (UTC+1)	Shinnie (yellow card) 45'; Nisbet (yellow card) 62'	Report	Said (yellow card) 58'; Charles-Cook 63'; Fadinger (yellow card) 72'; Longelo (yellow card) 73'	Stadium: Pittodrie Stadium; Attendance: 10,533; Referee: John Beaton
Note: Match streamed live on Premier Sports.

1 November 2025 Semi-finals	Motherwell	1–4	St Mirren	Glasgow
17:30 GMT (UTC)	Sparrow (yellow card) 82'; Hendry 83'	Report	Mandron 25', 89'; Nlundulu 40'; King (yellow card) 75', (goal) 86'; McMenamin (yellow card) 90+7'	Stadium: Hampden Park; Attendance: 21,277; Referee: Don Robertson
Note: Match shown live on Premier Sports 1.

== Squad statistics ==
=== Appearances ===
As of match played 16 May 2026

No.	Pos	Nat	Player	Total		Premiership		Scottish Cup		League Cup	
No.	Pos	Nat	Player	Apps	Goals	Apps	Goals	Apps	Goals	Apps	Goals
2	DF	(Scotland) SCO	Stephen O'Donnell	43	1	25+10	0	2	0	4+2	1
4	DF	(Scotland) SCO	Liam Gordon	24	1	10+7	1	2	0	5	0
6	DF	(Scotland) SCO	Jordan McGhee	8	0	0+7	0	0+1	0	0	0
7	MF	(Wales) WAL	Tom Sparrow	36	0	16+12	0	2	0	3+3	0
8	MF	(England) ENG	Callum Slattery	38	3	26+5	3	1+1	0	4+1	0
11	MF	(Scotland) SCO	Andy Halliday	7	0	0+2	0	0	0	2+3	0
12	MF	(Austria) AUT	Lukas Fadinger	43	5	34	3	1+1	0	7	2
13	GK	(England) ENG	Calum Ward	42	0	37	0	0	0	5	0
15	FW	(Norway) NOR	Eythor Bjørgolfsson	10	1	0+9	1	1	0	0	0
16	DF	(Scotland) SCO	Paul McGinn	38	0	32+1	0	1	0	4	0
18	FW	(Zimbabwe) ZIM	Tawanda Maswanhise	44	22	35	17	2	1	6+1	4
19	FW	(Scotland) SCO	Sam Nicholson	11	0	0+10	0	0+1	0	0	0
20	MF	(Scotland) SCO	Elliot Watt	42	6	34	6	0+1	0	6+1	0
21	MF	(New Zealand) NZL	Elijah Just	43	7	32+3	7	1+1	0	5+1	0
22	DF	(Australia) AUS	John Koutroumbis	32	1	17+8	1	1	0	4+2	0
25	MF	(Australia) AUS	Oscar Priestman	31	0	10+18	0	2	0	0+1	0
28	FW	(Scotland) SCO	Luca Ross	13	0	0+9	0	1	0	0+3	0
31	GK	(Scotland) SCO	Matthew Connelly	5	0	1	0	2	0	2	0
39	MF	(Scotland) SCO	Zander McAllister	4	0	0+2	0	0+1	0	0+1	0
42	MF	(Scotland) SCO	Rocco McColm	1	0	0+1	0	0	0	0	0
45	DF	(England) ENG	Emmanuel Longelo	44	9	31+5	8	0+2	0	5+1	1
57	DF	(Scotland) SCO	Stephen Welsh	29	1	27	1	0	0	1+1	0
66	FW	(Scotland) SCO	Callum Hendry	22	1	8+13	0	0	0	0+1	1
77	FW	(Grenada) GRN	Regan Charles-Cook	27	1	8+16	0	1	0	1+1	1
90	FW	(Nigeria) NGR	Ibrahim Said	45	3	25+13	3	1+1	0	3+2	0
Players away from the club on loan:
5	DF	(Northern Ireland) NIR	Kofi Balmer	9	0	1+4	0	0	0	2+2	0
9	FW	(Australia) AUS	Apostolos Stamatelopoulos	27	7	9+10	6	1	0	6+1	1
23	DF	(Scotland) SCO	Ewan Wilson	4	0	0	0	0	0	1+3	0
Players who left Motherwell during the season:
15	FW	(Scotland) SCO	Eseosa Sule	3	0	0	0	0	0	1+2	0
24	FW	(England) ENG	Esapa Osong	10	0	0+8	0	0	0	0+2	0

=== Goal scorers ===
As of match played 16 May 2026

Ranking	Nation	Position	Number	Name	Scottish Premiership	Scottish Cup	League Cup	Total
1	FW	(Zimbabwe)	18	Tawanda Maswanhise	17	1	4	22
2	DF	(England)	45	Emmanuel Longelo	8	0	1	9
3	MF	(New Zealand)	21	Elijah Just	7	0	0	7
3	FW	(Australia)	9	Apostolos Stamatelopoulos	6	0	1	7
5	MF	(Scotland)	20	Elliot Watt	6	0	0	6
6	MF	(Austria)	12	Lukas Fadinger	3	0	2	5
7	MF	(Nigeria)	90	Ibrahim Said	3	0	0	3
7	MF	(England)	8	Callum Slattery	3	0	0	3
9				Own goal	2	0	0	2
10	DF	(Australia)	22	John Koutroumbis	1	0	0	1
10	DF	(Scotland)	57	Stephen Welsh	1	0	0	1
10	FW	(Norway)	15	Eythor Bjørgolfsson	1	0	0	1
10	DF	(Scotland)	4	Liam Gordon	1	0	0	1
10	DF	(Scotland)	2	Stephen O'Donnell	0	0	1	1
10	FW	(Grenada)	77	Regan Charles-Cook	0	0	1	1
10	FW	(Scotland)	66	Callum Hendry	0	0	1	1
TOTALS					58	1	11	70

=== Clean sheets ===
As of match played 16 May 2026

Ranking	Nation	Position	Number	Name	Scottish Premiership	Scottish Cup	League Cup	Total
1	GK	(England)	13	Calum Ward	17	0	3	20
2	GK	(Scotland)	31	Matthew Connelly	1	1	1	3
TOTALS					18	1	4	23

=== Disciplinary record ===
As of match played 16 May 2026

Number	Nation	Position	Name	Premiership		Scottish Cup		League Cup		Total	
Number	Nation	Position	Name	Yellow card	Red card	Yellow card	Red card	Yellow card	Red card	Yellow card	Red card
2	(Scotland)	DF	Stephen O'Donnell	1	0	1	0	1	0	3	0
4	(Scotland)	DF	Liam Gordon	3	0	0	1	0	0	3	1
7	(Wales)	MF	Tom Sparrow	3	0	0	0	1	0	4	0
8	(England)	MF	Callum Slattery	8	0	1	0	2	0	11	0
12	(Austria)	MF	Lukas Fadinger	3	1	0	0	1	0	4	1
13	(England)	GK	Calum Ward	1	0	0	0	0	0	1	0
15	(Norway)	FW	Eythor Bjørgolfsson	1	0	0	0	0	0	1	0
16	(Scotland)	DF	Paul McGinn	4	0	0	0	0	0	4	0
18	(Zimbabwe)	FW	Tawanda Maswanhise	1	0	0	0	0	0	1	0
19	(Scotland)	FW	Sam Nicholson	1	0	0	0	0	0	1	0
20	(Scotland)	MF	Elliot Watt	8	1	0	0	0	0	8	1
21	(New Zealand)	MF	Elijah Just	4	0	0	0	0	0	4	0
22	(Australia)	DF	John Koutroumbis	1	0	0	0	0	0	1	0
25	(Australia)	MF	Oscar Priestman	1	0	0	1	0	0	1	1
45	(England)	DF	Emmanuel Longelo	6	1	0	0	1	0	7	1
57	(Scotland)	DF	Stephen Welsh	2	0	0	0	0	0	2	0
66	(Scotland)	FW	Callum Hendry	4	0	0	0	0	0	4	0
77	(Grenada)	FW	Regan Charles-Cook	2	0	0	0	0	0	2	0
90	(Nigeria)	FW	Ibrahim Said	6	0	0	0	1	0	7	0
Players away from the club on loan::
9	(Australia)	FW	Apostolos Stamatelopoulos	1	0	0	0	0	0	1	0
Players who left Motherwell during the season:
			TOTALS	60	3	2	2	7	0	69	5

=== Awards ===
==== G4 Claims Player of the month ====
Awarded by an online vote of supporters on the official Motherwell F.C. website.

Month	Player	Ref.
July	(Zimbabwe) Tawanda Maswanhise	
August	(Zimbabwe) Tawanda Maswanhise	
September	(Scotland) Elliot Watt	
October	(Scotland) Elliot Watt	
November	(Zimbabwe) Tawanda Maswanhise	
December	(Scotland) Elliot Watt	
January	(Zimbabwe) Tawanda Maswanhise	
February	(Zimbabwe) Tawanda Maswanhise	
March	(New Zealand) Elijah Just	
April	(England) Emmanuel Longelo	

==== Scottish Premiership Manager of the Month ====
Month	Player	Ref.
December	(Denmark) Jens Berthel Askou	
February	(Denmark) Jens Berthel Askou	

==== Scottish Premiership Player of the month ====
Month	Player	Ref.
November	(Zimbabwe) Tawanda Maswanhise	
December	(Scotland) Elliot Watt	
January	(Zimbabwe) Tawanda Maswanhise	

== See also ==
- List of Motherwell F.C. seasons
