= Longelo =

Longelo is a surname. Notable people with the surname include:

- Emmanuel Longelo (born 2000), English footballer
- Rosaire Longelo (born 1999), English footballer
