= Eythor Bjørgolfsson =

Norwegian footballer (born 2000)

Personal information
- Full name: Eythor Martin Vigerust Bjørgolfsson
- Date of birth: 25 August 2000 (age 26)
- Place of birth: Norway
- Height: 1.93 m (6 ft 4 in)
- Position: Forward

Team information
- Current team: Motherwell
- Number: 15

Youth career
- –2019: Ull/Kisa

College career
Years	Team	Apps	(Gls)
2019–2022	Kentucky Wildcats	68	(24)

Senior career*
Years	Team	Apps	(Gls)
2017–2019	Ull/Kisa 2	21	(13)
2021	Nardo	4	(2)
2022	Vermont Green FC	10	(6)
2023	Tacoma Defiance	16	(2)
2024	Moss	17	(3)
2024	→ Start (loan)	6	(1)
2025	Umeå FC	29	(15)
2026–	Motherwell	9	(1)
- * Club domestic league appearances and goals as of 23 March 2026

Eythor Martin Vigerust Bjørgolfsson (born 25 August 2000) is a Norwegian professional footballer who plays as a forward for Motherwell.

== Early life ==
Bjørgolfsson was born on 25 August 2000. Born in Norway, he is the son of an Icelandic father and a Norwegian mother.

== Career ==
Bjørgolfsson started his career with Norwegian side Ull/Kisa 2, where he made twenty-one league appearances and scored thirteen goals. He moved to the United States in 2019 and played four seasons of college soccer for the University of Kentucky Wildcats, where he scored 24 goals. During his senior season in 2023, Bjørgolfsson scored ten goals and was a semifinalist for the Hermann Trophy. During the summer of 2021, he signed for Norwegian side Nardo, where he made four league appearances and scored two goals. Bjørgolfsson signed with Vermont Green FC for the 2022 summer season and scored the club's first-ever goal on 15 May 2022. He finished the season with six goals.

He was selected in the second round of the 2023 MLS SuperDraft by Seattle Sounders FC. On 2 February 2023, Bjørgolfsson signed with Seattle's reserve team, the Tacoma Defiance, and played in the 2023 season of MLS Next Pro. He made sixteen appearances in league play and scored two goals. Bjørgolfsson was called up to the Sounders for a U.S. Open Cup match against the LA Galaxy.

One year later, he signed for Norwegian side Moss, where he made seventeen league appearances and scored three goals. The same year, he was sent on loan to Norwegian side Start, where he made six league appearances and scored one goal. Six months later, he signed for Swedish side Umeå FC, where he made twenty-nine league appearances and scored fifteen goals and suffered relegation from the second tier to the third tier.

=== Motherwell ===
On 19 January 2026, Scottish Premiership club Motherwell announced the signing of Bjørgolfsson from Umeå to a two-and-a-half-year contract.

== Career statistics ==
=== Club ===
As of match played 21 March 2026

Appearances and goals by club, season and competition
Club	Season	League			National Cup (Note: Includes U.S. Open Cup, Svenska Cupen and Scottish Cup)		League Cup (Note: Includes Leagues Cup and Scottish League Cup)		Other		Total	
Club	Season	Division	Apps	Goals	Apps	Goals	Apps	Goals	Apps	Goals	Apps	Goals
Vermont Green FC	2022	USL League Two	10	6	0	0	0	0	0	0	10	6
Tacoma Defiance	2023	MLS Next Pro	16	2	–		–		–		16	2
Seattle Sounders FC (loan)	2023	Major League Soccer	0	0	1	0	0	0	0 (Note: Appearances in the 2022 FIFA Club World Cup)	0	1	0
Moss	2024	OBOS-ligaen	17	3	0	0	–		–		17	3
Start (loan)	2024	OBOS-ligaen	6	1	0	0	–		–		6	1
Umeå	2025	Superettan	29	15	0	0	–		–		29	15
Motherwell	2025–26	Scottish Premiership	9	1	0	0	0	0	–		9	1
Career total			87	28	1	0	0	0	0	0	88	28
