= Colby Donovan =

Scottish footballer (born 2003)

Personal information
- Date of birth: 7 September 2006 (age 20)
- Place of birth: Glasgow, Scotland
- Height: 1.80 m (5 ft 11 in)
- Position: Right-back

Team information
- Current team: Celtic
- Number: 51

Youth career
- 2014–2023: Celtic

Senior career*
| Years | Team | Apps | (Gls) |
| 2023–2025 | Celtic B | 35 | (3) |
| 2024– | Celtic | 21 | (0) |

International career^{‡}
| 2024–2025 | Scotland U19 | 7 | (0) |
| 2025–2026 | Scotland U21 | 3 | (0) |
| 2026- | Scotland | 0 | (0) |
- * Club domestic league appearances and goals as of 13:02, 21 September 2026 (UTC) ‡ National team caps and goals as of 15:26, 7 July 2025 (UTC)

Colby Donovan (born 7 September 2006) is a Scottish professional footballer who plays as a right-back for Scottish Premiership club Celtic.

== Club career ==
A youth product of Celtic, Donovan graduated from their academy and signed his first professional contract with the club on 2 July 2022.

He was promoted to their B-team in 2023 which his performances earned him opportunities with the senior squad. He travelled with the first team for pre-season in the United States during the summer of 2024.

In the summer of 2025 he was promoted to their senior team, and signed a new contract at the club.

He was rewarded with his senior and professional debut with Celtic after coming on as a substitute for Anthony Ralston in a 3–0 Scottish Premiership win over Livingston on 23 August 2025.

Donovan’s first European start came on 24 September 2025 away in Serbia against Red Star Belgrade in their opening UEFA Europa League league-phase match which ended 1–1. When asked about his performance after the game, Donovan said "I just try and play with no fear and have as much confidence as I can,"

On October 26, 2026 Celtic announced that Donovan signed a new long-term contract ending 2031.

== International career ==
Donovan was called up to the Scotland U21s for a set of 2027 UEFA European Under-21 Championship qualification matches in September 2025. He was later called up to the senior national team ahead of UEFA Nations League matches in September 2026, but has yet to make an appearance.

== Career statistics ==
As of match played 20 September 2026

Appearances and goals by club, season and competition
| Club | Season | League | | | National cup (Note: Includes Scottish Cup) | | League cup (Note: Includes Scottish League Cup) | | Europe | | Other | | Total | |
| Club | Season | Division | Apps | Goals | Apps | Goals | Apps | Goals | Apps | Goals | Apps | Goals | Apps | Goals |
|---|---|---|---|---|---|---|---|---|---|---|---|---|---|---|
| Celtic B | 2023–24 | Lowland Football League | 12 | 1 | – | | | | | | | | 12 | 1 |
| Celtic B | 2024–25 | Lowland Football League | 23 | 2 | – | | | | | | | | 23 | 2 |
| Celtic B | 2025–26 | Lowland Football League | – | | | | | | | | 1 (Note: Appearance in the Scottish Challenge Cup) | 0 | 1 | 0 |
| Celtic B | Total | | 35 | 3 | – | | | | | | 1 | 0 | 36 | 3 |
| Celtic | 2024–25 | Scottish Premiership | 0 | 0 | 0 | 0 | 0 | 0 | 0 | 0 | – | | 0 | 0 |
| Celtic | 2025–26 | Scottish Premiership | 14 | 0 | 2 | 0 | 2 | 0 | 9 (Note: 1 appearance in the UEFA Champions League; 8 appearances in the UEFA Europa League) | 0 | – | | 27 | 0 |
| Celtic | 2026–27 | Scottish Premiership | 7 | 0 | 0 | 0 | 2 | 0 | 3 (Note: 2 appearances in the UEFA Champions League; 1 appearance in the UEFA Europa League) | 0 | – | | 12 | 0 |
| Celtic | Total | | 21 | 0 | 2 | 0 | 4 | 0 | 12 | 0 | – | | 39 | 0 |
| Career total | | | 56 | 3 | 2 | 0 | 4 | 0 | 12 | 0 | 1 | 0 | 75 | 3 |

== Honours ==
Celtic

- Scottish Premiership: 2025–26
- Scottish Cup: 2025–26
