= Tawanda Maswanhise =

Zimbabwean footballer (born 2002)

Personal information
- Full name: Tawanda Jethro Maswanhise
- Date of birth: 20 November 2002 (age 23)
- Place of birth: Harare, Zimbabwe
- Position: Forward

Team information
- Current team: Motherwell
- Number: 18

Youth career
- 2011–2024: Leicester City

Senior career*
Years	Team	Apps	(Gls)
2023–2024	Leicester City	0	(0)
2024–	Motherwell	72	(24)

International career^{‡}
2024–	Zimbabwe	21	(3)
- * Club domestic league appearances and goals as of 07:26, 25 September 2026 (UTC) ‡ National team caps and goals as of 18:00, 16 November 2026 (UTC)

Tawanda Jethro Maswanhise (born 20 November 2002) is a Zimbabwean footballer who plays as a forward for Scottish Premiership club Motherwell and the Zimbabwe national football team.

== Club career ==
Maswanhise started his career in the academy of EFL Championship side Leicester City.

On 6 January 2024, Maswanhise made his senior debut for Leicester as a 77th-minute substitute for Wanya Marçal during a 3–2 away win against Millwall in the third round of the FA Cup. However, he was released by the club at the end of the season.

=== Motherwell ===
On 18 August 2024, after going on trial with different clubs, Maswanhise joined Scottish Premiership club Motherwell. He signed a short-term deal until January 2025. Later on the same day, he made his debut for the club as a 58th-minute substitute in a 1–0 win against Kilmarnock in the second round of the Scottish League Cup. On 14 August 2025, Motherwell announced that Maswanhise had extended his contract with the club, until the summer of 2027, with the option of an additional year. In his second season with the club, Maswanhise finished as the top scorer in the division.

== International career ==
On 26 March 2024, Maswanhise made his senior Zimbabwe debut in a 3–1 loss against Kenya.

On 11 December 2025, Maswanhise was called by Zimbabwe for their participation in the 2025 Africa Cup of Nations. On 29 December 2025, in their last group match against South Africa, he scored a goal in the 17th minute.

He withdrew from the Zimbabwean side to play in the Four nations tournament in end of March 2025 due to a small issue as per reports by his club, Motherwell.

== Personal life ==
He is the son of Zimbabwean sprinter Jeffrey Maswanhise.

== Career statistics ==
=== Club ===
As of match played 19 September 2026

Appearances and goals by club, season and competition
Club	Season	League			National cup (Note: Includes FA Cup and Scottish Cup)		League cup (Note: Includes EFL Cup and Scottish League Cup)		Continental		Other		Total	
Club	Season	Division	Apps	Goals	Apps	Goals	Apps	Goals	Apps	Goals	Apps	Goals	Apps	Goals
Leicester City U23	2021–22	—			—		—		—		3 (Note: Appearance(s) in EFL Trophy)	0	3	0
Leicester City U23	2022–23	—			—		—		—		3	2	3	2
Leicester City U23	2023–24	—			—		—		—		1	0	1	0
Leicester City U23	Total		—		—		—		—		7	2	7	2
Leicester City	2023–24	Championship	0	0	1	0	0	0	—		—		1	0
Motherwell	2024–25	Scottish Premiership	30	6	1	0	3	0	—		—		34	6
Motherwell	2025–26	Scottish Premiership	35	17	2	1	7	4	—		—		44	22
Motherwell	2026–27	Scottish Premiership	7	1	0	0	1	0	6 (Note: Appearances and goals in the UEFA Conference League)	1	—		14	2
Motherwell	Total		72	24	3	1	11	4	6	1	0	0	92	30
Career total			72	24	4	1	11	4	6	1	7	2	100	32

=== International ===
As of match played 16 November 2026

Appearances and goals by national team and year
National team	Year	Apps	Goals
Zimbabwe	2024	7	1
Zimbabwe	2025	10	1
Zimbabwe	2026	4	1
Total		21	3

As of match played 16 November 2026
Zimbabwe score listed first, score column indicates score after each Maswanhise goal.

List of international goals scored by Tawanda Maswanhise
No.	Date	Venue	Opponent	Score	Result	Competition
1	15 November 2024	Peter Mokaba Stadium, Polokwane, South Africa	Kenya	1–0	1–1	2025 Africa Cup of Nations qualification
2	29 December 2025	Adrar Stadium, Agadir, Morocco	South Africa	1–1	2–3	2025 Africa Cup of Nations
3	16 November 2026	National Sports Stadium, Harare, Zimbabwe	Equatorial Guinea	3–0	3–0	2027 Africa Cup of Nations qualification

== Honours ==
Individual

- Scottish Premiership top scorer: 2025–26
