= Stephen Welsh =

Scottish footballer

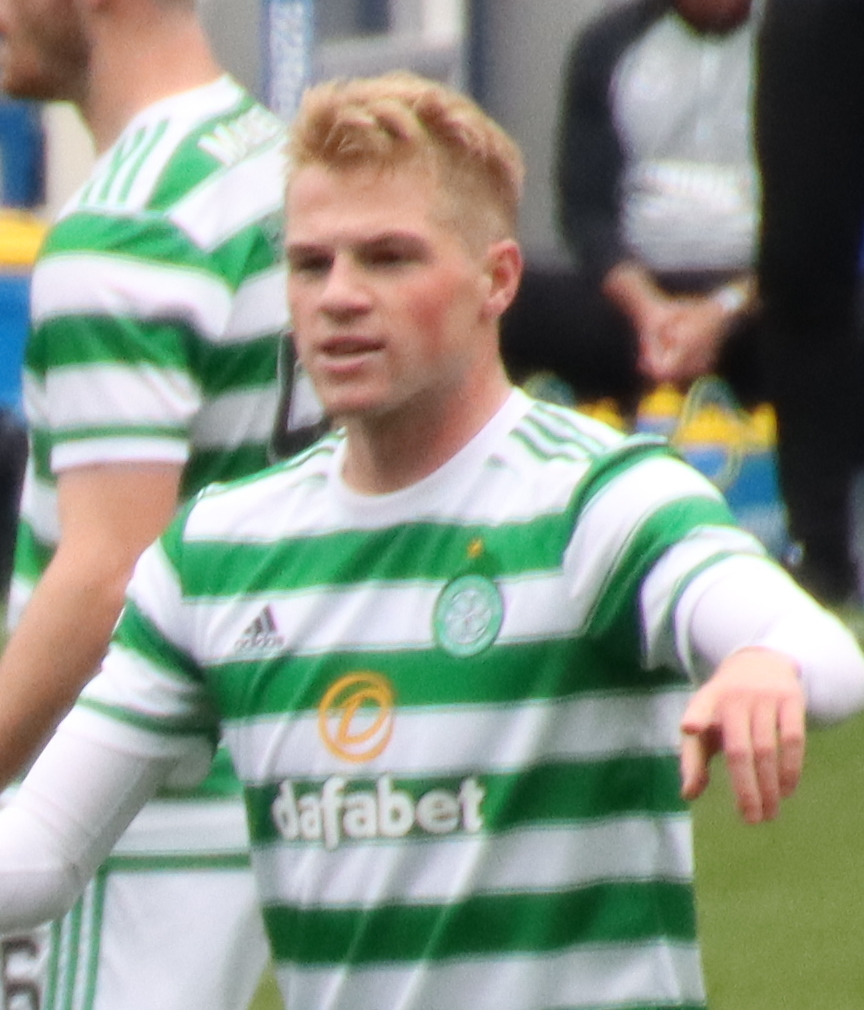
- Welsh with Celtic in 2021

Personal information
- Full name: Stephen John Welsh
- Date of birth: 19 January 2000 (age 26)
- Place of birth: Coatbridge, Scotland
- Height: 6 ft 3 in (1.91 m)
- Position: Centre-back

Team information
- Current team: Swansea City

Youth career
- Celtic

Senior career*
Years	Team	Apps	(Gls)
2019–2026	Celtic	43	(2)
2019–2020	→ Greenock Morton (loan)	15	(0)
2025	→ Mechelen (loan)	17	(1)
2025–2026	→ Motherwell (loan)	15	(0)
2026	→ Motherwell (loan)	12	(1)
2026–	Swansea City	13	(0)

International career^{‡}
2016–2017	Scotland U17	8	(0)
2017–2020	Scotland U19	13	(0)
2021–2022	Scotland U21	10	(0)
2026–	Scotland	4	(0)
- * Club domestic league appearances and goals as of 31 October 2026 ‡ National team caps and goals as of 7 October 2026

Stephen John Welsh (born 19 January 2000) is a Scottish professional footballer who plays as a centre-back for EFL Championship club Swansea City and the Scotland national team.

== Club career ==
=== Celtic ===
Welsh began his career in the youth sides at Celtic, stepping up to their development side in 2017, and in March 2018, signed a contract with the club until 2020. Alongside fixtures in the SPFL Development League, he featured for the team in the Scottish Challenge Cup.

On 29 August 2019, Welsh moved on a season-long loan to Scottish Championship club Greenock Morton. He was recalled by Celtic during January 2020. He made his first team debut for Celtic on 2 February 2020, in a 4–1 win away to Hamilton Academical.

On 6 February 2021, Welsh scored the first senior goal of his career with a header from a David Turnbull corner in the opening minutes of a 2–1 league win against Motherwell. On 13 April 2021, he signed a new contract with Celtic that is due to run until 2025. On 9 December 2021, Welsh scored an early header against La Liga side Real Betis in a UEFA Europa League match where Celtic won 3–2 at Celtic Park in their last group-stage game in the competition that season.

On 31 July 2022, Welsh scored the first goal in Celtic's 2022–23 Scottish Premiership opener against Aberdeen in a 2–0 home win. On 10 January 2022, it was reported that Serie A side Udinese had made a loan offer with an option to purchase attached for Welsh, which Celtic chose to reject.

Ligue 1 side Toulouse made an approach for Welsh during the 2022 summer transfer window. However, Celtic remained uninterested in selling the player as manager Ange Postecoglou saw him as being part of first-team plans.

On 18 August 2023, Welsh signed a new four-year contract with Celtic, keeping him at the club until 2027. During the summer transfer window in 2024, Celtic knocked back a bid for Welsh from Belgian Pro League side Mechelen.

On 9 January 2025, after Mechelen inquired about Welsh for a second time, he moved on loan to the Belgian club for the remainder of the 2024–25 season.

=== Motherwell (loan) ===
On 1 September 2025, Welsh joined Scottish Premiership club Motherwell on a season-long loan deal. On 11 January 2026, Celtic's interim manager Martin O'Neill ended Welsh's loan early due to a need for cover at centre back. Two days earlier, Aberdeen had made an approach about signing Welsh permanently.

On 2 February 2026, after making two appearances for Celtic, he was sent back out on loan to Motherwell less than a month after leaving, as a result of Celtic signing Benjamin Arthur as centre back cover. In his first game back at Fir Park, on 11 February, Welsh scored a late equaliser against Rangers to rescue a 1–1 draw.

=== Swansea City ===
Despite Welsh having a year left on his Celtic contract, it was terminated early as a gesture of goodwill for his long service to the club. He signed a two-year contract with EFL Championship club Swansea City, with the option of a further year.

== International career ==
Welsh has represented Scotland at under-17, under-19 and under-21 levels. He captained the under-21 side on numerous occasions. On 10 June 2022, he played his final game for the under-21s against Denmark in a 1–1 UEFA European Under-21 Championship qualifying draw where he faced Celtic teammate Matt O'Riley.

On 15 September 2026, Welsh received his first ever call up to the senior team when he was named in new Scotland manager Sebastien Pocognoli's first squad for the 2026–27 UEFA Nations League. He credited his loan spell with Motherwell for his inclusion in the national side.

He made his debut on 26 September against Slovenia in the UEFA Nations League. He was praised for his performance in the 0–0 draw in Ljubljana. Welsh subsequently came on as an early substitute for Kieron Bowie in the next game against Switzerland at Hampden Park, after a red card for Jack Hendry. This was followed by consecutive starts in a 2-0 victory over North Macedonia in Skopje and a 2-1 defeat to Slovenia in Glasgow on 3 October and 6 October, respectively.

== Career statistics ==
=== Club ===
As of 3 November 2026

Appearances and goals by club, season and competition
Club	Season	League			National Cup (Note: Includes Scottish Cup & FA Cup)		League Cup (Note: Includes Scottish League Cup & EFL Cup)		Other		Total	
Club	Season	Division	Apps	Goals	Apps	Goals	Apps	Goals	Apps	Goals	Apps	Goals
Celtic U20s (Note: Appearances for Celtic under-20s/21s in the Scottish Challenge Cup in which age-restricted sides from the Scottish Premiership clubs compete against senior clubs.)	2017–18	N/A	—						1	0	1	0
Celtic U20s	2018–19	N/A	—						1	0	1	0
Celtic U20s	2019–20	N/A	—						2	0	2	0
Celtic U20s	Total		0	0	0	0	0	0	4	0	4	0
Celtic	2019–20	Scottish Premiership	1	0	0	0	0	0	0	0	1	0
Celtic	2020–21	Scottish Premiership	16	1	2	0	0	0	3 (Note: Appearances in the UEFA Europa League)	0	21	1
Celtic	2021–22	Scottish Premiership	10	0	3	0	2	1	9 (Note: 2 appearances in the UEFA Champions League, 6 appearances / 1 goal in the UEFA Europa League, 1 appearance in the UEFA Conference League)	1	24	2
Celtic	2022–23	Scottish Premiership	4	1	0	0	1	0	1 (Note: Appearances in the UEFA Champions League)	0	6	1
Celtic	2023–24	Scottish Premiership	10	0	3	0	0	0	1	0	14	0
Celtic	2024–25	Scottish Premiership	1	0	0	0	1	0	0	0	2	0
Celtic	2025–26	Scottish Premiership	1	0	1	0	0	0	0	0	2	0
Celtic	Total		43	2	9	0	4	1	14	1	70	4
Greenock Morton (loan)	2019–20	Scottish Championship	15	1	3	0	0	0	0	0	18	1
Mechelen (loan)	2024–25	Belgian Pro League	17	1	—		—		—		17	1
Motherwell (loan)	2025–26	Scottish Premiership	15	0	0	0	2	0	—		17	0
Motherwell (loan)	2025–26	Scottish Premiership	12	1	—		—		—		12	1
Swansea City	2026–27	EFL Championship	13	0	0	0	0	0	—		13	0
Career total			115	5	12	0	6	1	18	1	151	7

=== International ===
As of match played 6 October 2026

Appearances and goals by national team and year
National team	Year	Apps	Goals
Scotland	2026	4	0
Total		4	0

== Honours ==
Celtic

- Scottish Premiership (4): 2019–20, 2021–22, 2022–23, 2023–24
- Scottish Cup (2): 2022–23, 2023–24
- Scottish League Cup (3): 2021–22, 2022–23, 2024–25
