= Callum Slattery =

English footballer (born 1999)

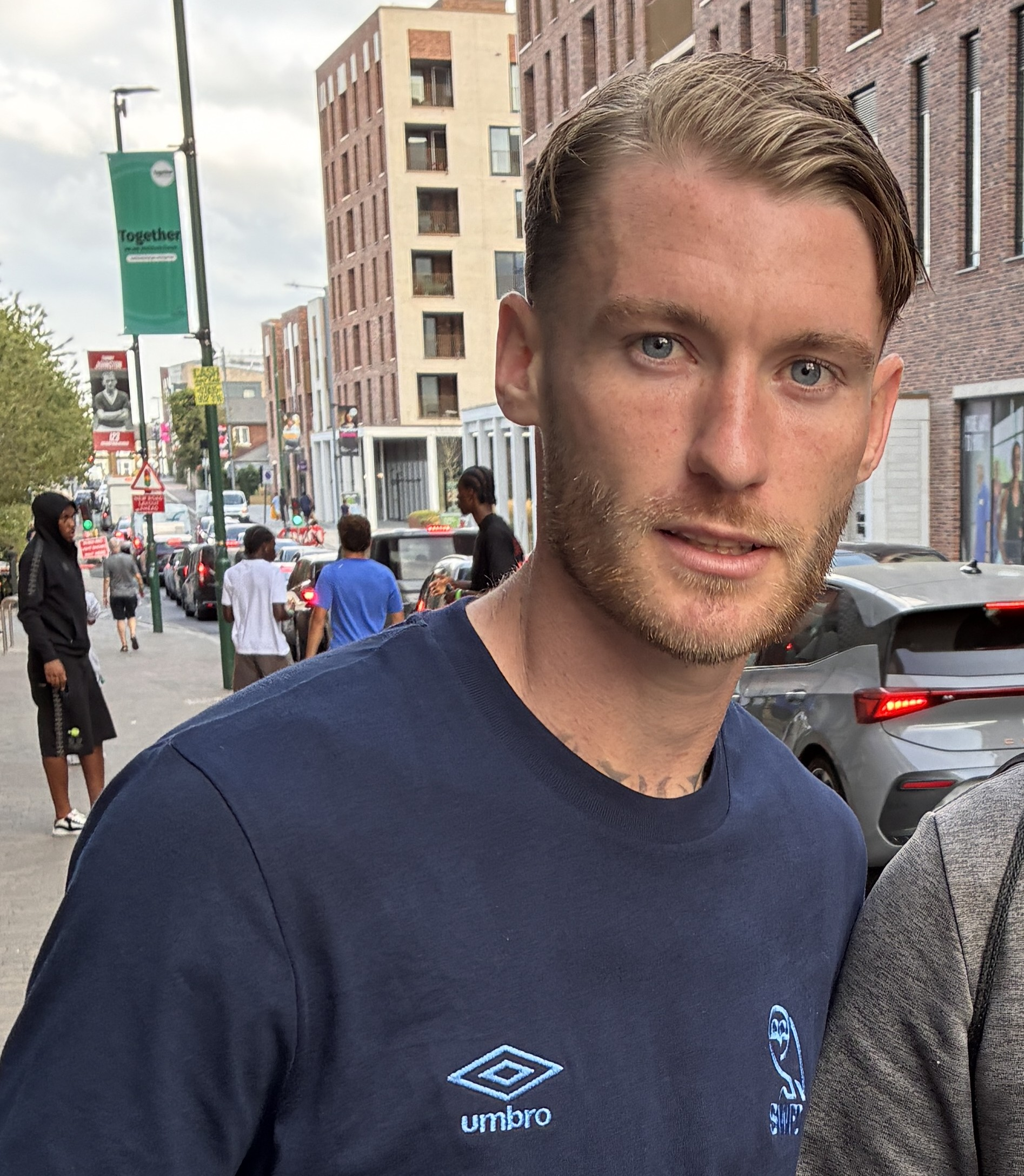
- Slattery in 2026

Personal information
- Full name: Callum Grant Slattery
- Date of birth: 8 February 1999 (age 27)
- Place of birth: Kidlington, England
- Position: Midfielder

Team information
- Current team: Sheffield Wednesday
- Number: 8

Youth career
- –2008: Chelsea
- 2008–2017: Southampton

Senior career*
Years	Team	Apps	(Gls)
2017–2021	Southampton	3	(0)
2020	→ De Graafschap (loan)	5	(1)
2021	→ Gillingham (loan)	7	(0)
2021–2026	Motherwell	126	(16)
2026–	Sheffield Wednesday	14	(3)

International career^{‡}
2014–2015	England U17	5	(0)
2014–2015	England U16	4	(0)
2017	England U20	6	(0)
- * Club domestic league appearances and goals as of 21:58, 20 November 2026 (UTC) ‡ National team caps and goals as of 13:06, 16 October 2019 (UTC)

Callum Grant Slattery (born 8 February 1999) is an English professional footballer who plays as a midfielder for EFL League One club Sheffield Wednesday.

Slattery is a product of the Southampton academy and made his professional debut for the club in January 2019. He had loan spells with De Graafschap and Gillingham. In July 2021, Slattery joined Motherwell. After making 148 appearances for the club in all competitions, he moved to Sheffield Wednesday in June 2026. Slattery has represented his country at youth level.

== Professional career ==
=== Southampton ===
In July 2017, Slattery signed a three-year professional contract with Southampton. Slattery was named in the starting eleven of the first team on 5 January 2019 in the FA Cup third round against Derby County at Pride Park Stadium.

==== De Graafschap ====
On 31 January 2020, Slattery joined Eerste Divisie side De Graafschap on loan until the end of the season.

==== Gillingham ====
On 14 January 2021, Slattery joined League One side Gillingham on loan for the remainder of the 2020–21 season. He made his first appearance for the club two days later in a 1–0 victory against Accrington Stanley.

=== Motherwell ===
On 24 July 2021, Slattery joined Motherwell on a three-year contract for an undisclosed fee. During a training session in January 2024, Slattery suffered a serious knee injury that kept him out for 369 days.

On 20 June 2024, Motherwell announced that Slattery had signed a new one-year contract, with the option of an additional year. On 18 March 2025, Motherwell announced that they had triggered their one-year contract extension with Slattery.

On 19 May 2026, Motherwell announced that Slattery would be leaving the club after five years, when his contract expired at the end of the season.

=== Sheffield Wednesday ===
On 29 June 2026, Slattery signed a three-year contract at EFL League One club Sheffield Wednesday. He was one of eight players to make their debut against Bolton Wanderers in the EFL Cup, starting the game in a 1–0 win. He scored his first goal for Wednesday the following week on the opening day of the League One season against Leyton Orient, where he managed to deflect the ball into the net from a Nathan Baxter kick. With his second goal of the season coming in the 7–2 win against Bromley, and his ″high energy performances and creativity in the middle″, he won the clubs player of the month for August.

== International career ==
Slattery was part of the England team that won the 2017 Toulon Tournament. He scored the fourth penalty in the shoot-out in the final against Ivory Coast.

== Personal life ==
Slattery was arrested by police in November 2021 after an incident in the city centre of Glasgow where he used threatening and abusive behaviour and uttered homophobic remarks. He reportedly assaulted a police officer during the matter. In October 2022, Slattery appeared at Glasgow Sheriff Court and admitted two charges of behaving in a threatening or abusive manner, with one aggravated by prejudice related to sexual orientation. He was subsequently convicted and fined £1,350.

== Career statistics ==
As of 20 November 2026

Appearances and goals by club, season and competition
Club	Season	League			National Cup		League Cup		Other		Total	
Club	Season	Division	Apps	Goals	Apps	Goals	Apps	Goals	Apps	Goals	Apps	Goals
Southampton	2018–19	Premier League	3	0	2	0	0	0	—		5	0
Southampton	2019–20	Premier League	0	0	0	0	0	0	—		0	0
Southampton	2020–21	Premier League	0	0	0	0	0	0	—		0	0
Southampton	Total		3	0	2	0	0	0	0	0	5	0
Southampton U21s	2016–17 EFL Trophy		—		—		—		2 (Note: Appearances in the EFL Trophy)	1	2	1
Southampton U21s	2017–18 EFL Trophy		—		—		—		3	0	3	0
Southampton U21s	2018–19 EFL Trophy		—		—		—		2	0	2	0
Southampton U21s	2019–20 EFL Trophy		—		—		—		2	2	2	2
Southampton U21s	2020–21 EFL Trophy		—		—		—		1	1	1	1
Southampton U21s	Total		—		—		—		10	4	10	4
De Graafschap (loan)	2019–20	Eerste Divisie	5	1	0	0	—		—		5	1
Gillingham (loan)	2020–21	EFL League One	7	0	0	0	0	0	0	0	7	0
Motherwell	2021–22	Scottish Premiership	31	2	1	0	2	0	—		34	2
Motherwell	2022–23	Scottish Premiership	29	4	2	0	2	0	2 (Note: Appearances in the UEFA Europa Conference League)	0	35	4
Motherwell	2023–24	Scottish Premiership	20	1	0	0	5	2	—		25	3
Motherwell	2024–25	Scottish Premiership	15	6	1	0	0	0	—		16	3
Motherwell	2025–26	Scottish Premiership	31	3	2	0	5	0	—		38	3
Motherwell	Total		126	16	6	0	14	2	2	0	148	18
Sheffield Wednesday	2026–27	EFL League One	14	3	1	0	1	0	2	0	18	3
Career total			155	20	9	0	15	2	14	4	193	26
