= 2024–25 KV Mechelen season =

K.V. Mechelen
2024–25 season
- Manager: Besnik Hasi
- Stadium: Achter de Kazerne
- Belgian Pro League regular season: 8th
- Europe play-offs: 3rd
- Belgian Cup: Round of 16
- Top goalscorer: League: Benito Raman (13); All: Benito Raman (13)
- Average home league attendance: 12,213

The 2024–25 season was the 121st season in the history of K.V. Mechelen, and the club's sixth consecutive season in Belgian Pro League. In addition to the domestic league, the team participated in the Belgian Cup.

== Transfers ==
=== In ===
Pos.	Player	Transferred from	Fee	Date	Source
GK	(Belgium) Ortwin De Wolf	(Belgium) Zulte Waregem	Undisclosed	1 July 2024	
DF	(Spain) José Marsà	FC Andorra		13 July 2024	
MF	(Belgium) Aziz Ouattara Mohammed	(Belgium) Genk	Loan	23 July 2024	
DF	(Belgium) Zinho Vanheusden	(Italy) Inter Milan	Loan	25 July 2024	
FW	(Belgium) Benito Raman	(Turkey) Samsunspor	Undisclosed	23 August 2024	
MF	(Sweden) Fredrik Hammar	(Sweden) Hammarby IF	Undisclosed	7 January 2025	
DF	(Scotland) Stephen Welsh	(Scotland) Hammarby IF	Loan	9 January 2025	

== Friendlies ==
25 June 2024 Friendly	Oudenaarde (Belgium)	0–3	(Belgium) Mechelen
19:00 UTC+2

29 June 2024 Friendly	Beerschot (Belgium)	1–2	(Belgium) Mechelen	Tubize
16:00 UTC+2				Stadium: Centre National de Football Euro 2000

6 July 2024 Friendly	Antwerp (Belgium)	2–1	(Belgium) Mechelen
14:00 UTC+2
Note: 2 x 60 minutes

13 July 2024 Friendly	Lille (France)	1–1	(Belgium) Mechelen	Camphin-en-Pévèle
17:00 UTC+2	Cabella 27'		71'	Stadium: Complexe Sportif de Luchin

17 July 2024 Friendly	K.S.K. Heist (Belgium)	0–1	(Belgium) Mechelen
19:30 UTC+2			68'

20 July 2024 Friendly	Olympiacos (Greece)	2–0	(Belgium) Mechelen	Vlaardingen
15:00 UTC+2	Mouzakitis 5'; Gelson Martins 28'			Stadium: Sportpark 't Nieuwelant

17 April 2025 Friendly	Zulte Waregem (Belgium)	0–6	(Belgium) Mechelen
11:00

== Competitions ==
=== Overall record ===
Competition	First match	Last match	Starting round	Final position	Record							
Competition	First match	Last match	Starting round	Final position	Pld	W	D	L	GF	GA	GD	Win %
Belgian Pro League regular season	26 July 2024	16 March 2025	Matchday 1	8th	30	10	8	12	45	40	+5	33.33
play-offs		29 May 2025			0	0	0	0	0	0	+0	—
Belgian Cup					0	0	0	0	0	0	+0	—
Total					30	10	8	12	45	40	+5	33.33

Source: Soccerway

=== Belgian Pro League ===
==== League table ====
Pos	Team	Pld	W	D	L	GF	GA	GD	Pts	Qualification or relegation
6	Gent	30	11	12	7	41	33	+8	45	Qualification for the Champions' play-offs
7	Standard Liège	30	10	9	11	22	35	−13	39	Qualification for the Europe play-offs
8	Mechelen	30	10	8	12	45	40	+5	38	Qualification for the Europe play-offs
9	Westerlo	30	10	7	13	50	49	+1	37	Qualification for the Europe play-offs
10	Charleroi	30	10	7	13	36	36	0	37	Qualification for the Europe play-offs

Source: Jupiler Pro League (in Dutch), Soccerway
Rules for classification: 1) Points; 2) Matches won; 3) Goal difference; 4) Goals scored; 5) Away matches won; 6) Away goal difference; 7) Away goals scored; 8) Play-off.

==== Results summary ====
Overall								Home						Away					
Pld	W	D	L	GF	GA	GD	Pts	W	D	L	GF	GA	GD	W	D	L	GF	GA	GD
30	10	8	12	45	40	+5	38	6	5	4	31	20	+11	4	3	8	14	20	−6

==== Results by round ====
Round	1	2	3	4	5	6	7	8
Ground	A	H	A	H	A	H	A	H
Result	D	L	D	L	W	W	L	
Position	5	12	13	14	13	9	12	

A = Away; H = Home; W = Win; D = Draw; L = Loss

==== Matches ====
The match schedule was released on 11 June 2024.

26 July 2024 1	Club Brugge	1–1	Mechelen	Bruges
20:45	Seys 51'; Siquet (yellow card) 72'		Walsh (yellow card) 50'; Pflücke 65'; Konaté (yellow card) 82'	Stadium: Jan Breydel Stadium; Referee: Erik Lambrechts

3 August 2024 2	Mechelen	2–4	Westerlo	Mechelen
16:00	Storm 65'; Pflücke 88' (pen.)		Madsen 18' (pen.); Vušković 36'; Alcócer 79'; Frigan 90+5'	Stadium: AFAS Stadion; Referee: Bram van Driessche

9 August 2024 3	Standard Liège	0–0	Mechelen	Liège
20:45				Stadium: Stade Maurice Dufrasne

22 September 2024 8	Mechelen	2–0	Cercle Brugge	Mechelen
16:00				Stadium: AFAS Stadion

26 January 2025 23	Anderlecht	4–1	Mechelen

31 January 2025 24	OH Leuven	1–0	Mechelen

8 February 2025 25	Mechelen	3–3	Gent

16 February 2025 26	Union Saint-Gilloise	0–1	Mechelen

21 February 2025 27	Mechelen	1–1	Sint-Truiden

2 March 2025 28	Beerschot	1–0	Mechelen

8 March 2025 29	Charleroi	0–1	Mechelen

16 March 2025 30	Mechelen	2–1	Dender

==== Europe play-offs ====
Pos	Team	Pld	W	D	L	GF	GA	GD	Pts	Qualification or relegation	CHA	WES	MEC	DEN	STA	OHL
1	Charleroi (O)	10	6	3	1	19	10	+9	40	Qualification for the European competition play-off		4–3	3–0	4–1	1–0	2–1
2	Westerlo	10	3	5	2	19	16	+3	33		2–2		2–2	4–2	0–0	2–2
3	Mechelen	10	2	6	2	17	17	0	31		1–1	2–3		5–2	0–0	1–1
4	Dender EH	10	3	4	3	20	21	−1	29		2–1	1–0	2–2		1–1	5–0
5	Standard Liège	10	0	7	3	5	8	−3	27		0–1	1–1	2–2	0–0		0–1

Source: Jupiler Pro League (in Dutch), Soccerway
Legend: Blue = home team win; Yellow = draw; Red = away team win.
Rules for classification: 1) Points; 2) Points without (possible) half points added due to rounding; 3) Regular season finishing position.
(O) Play-off winners

===== Results by round =====
Round	1	2	3	4	5	6	7	8	9	10
Ground	A	H	H	A	H	A	A	H	H	A
Result	D	W	D	L	L	D	W	D	D	D
Position										

A = Away; H = Home; W = Win; D = Draw; L = Loss

29 March 2025 1	Standard Liège	2–2	Mechelen

4 April 2025 2	Mechelen	5–2	Dender

13 April 2025 3	Mechelen	1–1	OH Leuven

19 April 2025 4	Charleroi	3–0	Mechelen

22 April 2025 5	Mechelen	2–3	Westerlo

26 April 2025 6	Westerlo	2–2	Mechelen

3 May 2025 7	OH Leuven	1–2	Mechelen

10 May 2025 8	Mechelen	0–0	Standard Liège

18 May 2025 9	Mechelen	1–1	Charleroi

24 May 2025 10	Dender	2–2	Mechelen

=== Belgian Cup ===
30 October 2024 Round of 32	Mechelen	3–1	La Louvière
20:00

4 December 2024 Round of 16	Beerschot	2–2 (a.e.t.) (4–3 p)	Mechelen
20:30
