= Calum Ward =

English footballer

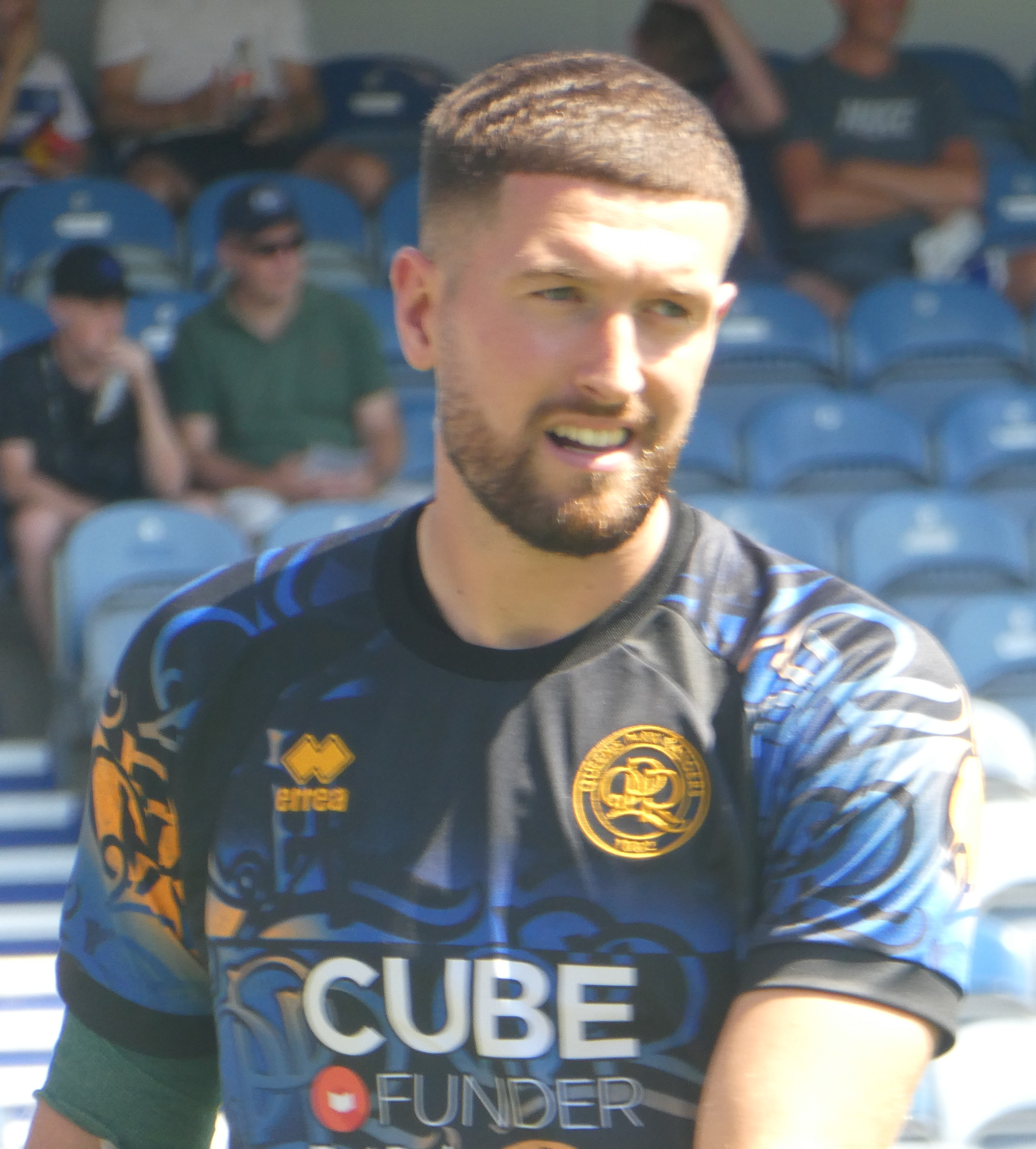
- Ward in 2026

Personal information
- Full name: Calum Brian Joseph Ward
- Date of birth: 17 October 2000 (age 26)
- Place of birth: Havering, England
- Height: 1.88 m (6 ft 2 in)
- Position: Goalkeeper

Team information
- Current team: Queens Park Rangers
- Number: 13

Youth career
- 2013–2018: AFC Bournemouth

Senior career*
Years	Team	Apps	(Gls)
2018–2021	AFC Bournemouth	0	(0)
2018	→ Totton & Eling (loan)	13	(0)
2018	→ Bashley (loan)	10	(0)
2019	→ Thatcham Town (loan)	7	(0)
2019–2020	→ Weymouth (loan)	32	(0)
2021	→ HIFK (loan)	0	(0)
2021	HIFK	14	(0)
2022–2024	AC Oulu	81	(0)
2025–2026	Motherwell	37	(0)
2026–	Queens Park Rangers	0	(0)
- * Club domestic league appearances and goals as of 8 July 2026

Calum Brian Joseph Ward (born 17 October 2000) is an English professional footballer who plays as a goalkeeper for EFL Championship club Queens Park Rangers.

== Career ==
Ward joined AFC Bournemouth in 2013. In March 2019, after loan spells at Wessex Football League sides Totton & Eling and Bashley, Ward joined Thatcham Town on loan. He made seven Southern Football League appearances for Thatcham Town.

In July 2019, he joined National League South side Weymouth on a season-long loan deal.

In January 2021, he joined Veikkausliiga side HIFK on loan until June. In April 2021, the move was made permanent.

On 17 November 2021, Ward joined fellow Veikkausliiga side AC Oulu for the 2022 season. On 11 November 2023, Ward extended his contract with Oulu, signing a new one-year deal with an option for an additional year.

=== Motherwell ===
On 3 February 2025, Ward joined Motherwell in Scottish Premiership. On 30 April 2025, Motherwell announced that they had extended their contract with Ward for the 2025–26 season with the club also holding the option of an additional year. On 12 December 2025, Motherwell announced that they had again extended their contract with Ward, this time until the summer of 2027, with the club holding the option of an additional year. In March 2026, Ward broke the record for the most clean sheets by a Motherwell goalkeeper in a single season with 20.

=== Queens Park Rangers ===
On 9 July 2026, Ward signed for EFL Championship club Queens Park Rangers for an undisclosed fee, reported to be £650,000.

== Personal life ==
His younger brother Christie Ward is also a professional footballer for National League South club AFC Totton.

== Career statistics ==
As of match played 21 March 2026

Appearances and goals by club, season and competition
Club	Season	League			National cup (Note: Includes FA Cup, Suomen Cup and Scottish Cup)		League cup (Note: Includes Finnish League Cup and Scottish League Cup)		Total	
Club	Season	Division	Apps	Goals	Apps	Goals	Apps	Goals	Apps	Goals
Thatcham Town (loan)	2018–19	Southern Football League	7	0	0	0	0	0	7	0
Weymouth (loan)	2019–20	National League South	32	0	2	0	0	0	36	0
HIFK	2021	Veikkausliiga	14	0	0	0	—		14	0
AC Oulu	2022	Veikkausliiga	27	0	0	0	2	0	29	0
AC Oulu	2023	Veikkausliiga	27	0	1	0	4	0	32	0
AC Oulu	2024	Veikkausliiga	27	0	1	0	3	0	31	0
AC Oulu	Total		81	0	2	0	9	0	92	0
Motherwell	2024–25	Scottish Premiership	0	0	0	0	0	0	0	0
Motherwell	2025–26	Scottish Premiership	31	0	0	0	5	0	36	0
Motherwell	Total		31	0	0	0	5	0	36	0
Career total			167	0	4	0	14	0	185	0
