= 2025–26 Scottish Premiership =

129th season of top-tier football league in Scotland

Scottish Premiership
- Season: 2025–26
- Dates: 2 August 2025 – 17 May 2026
- Champions: Celtic; 12th Premiership title 56th Scottish title
- Relegated: Livingston
- Champions League: Celtic; Heart of Midlothian
- Europa League: Rangers
- Conference League: Motherwell; Hibernian
- Matches: 228
- Goals: 634 (2.78 per match)
- Top goalscorer: Tawanda Maswanhise (17 goals)
- Biggest home win: Four goals (10 matches)
- Biggest away win: St Mirren 0–5 Motherwell (21 February 2026)
- Highest scoring: Falkirk 3–6 Rangers (12 April 2026)
- Longest winning run: Celtic (7 games)
- Longest unbeaten run: Rangers (16 games)
- Longest winless run: Livingston (31 games)
- Longest losing run: Kilmarnock (6 games)
- Highest attendance: 59,079; Celtic 3–1 Heart of Midlothian (16 May 2026)
- Lowest attendance: 1,564; Livingston 1–1 St Mirren (20 January 2026)
- Total attendance: 4,082,619
- Average attendance: 17,906

The 2025–26 Scottish Premiership (known as the William Hill Premiership for sponsorship reasons) was the 13th season of the Scottish Premiership, the highest division of Scottish football, and the 129th edition overall of the top national league competition, not including one cancelled due to World War II. The season began on 2 August 2025.

Twelve teams contested the league: Aberdeen, Celtic, Dundee, Dundee United, Falkirk, Heart of Midlothian, Hibernian, Kilmarnock, Livingston, Motherwell, Rangers and St Mirren.

On 16 May 2026, Celtic secured a fifth consecutive Premiership title and record-breaking 56th Scottish league title overall, following a 3–1 victory at home to Heart of Midlothian on the final matchday, denying Hearts their first championship since 1960 and the first non-Old Firm championship since 1985. Excluding post-season playoffs in 1891 and 1905, it was only the third time the Scottish championship had been decided between the two contenders directly on the final matchday, after 1965 (also involving Hearts) and 1991.

== Teams ==
The following teams changed division after the 2024–25 season.

Promoted from the Championship

- Falkirk
- Livingston

Relegated to the Championship

- Ross County
- St Johnstone

=== Stadia and locations ===
2025–26 Scottish Premiership
Team locations:
1 Aberdeen
2 Celtic
3 Dundee
4 Dundee United
5 Falkirk
6 Heart of Midlothian
7 Hibernian
8 Kilmarnock
9 Livingston
10 Motherwell
11 Rangers
12 St Mirren

| Team | Stadium | Capacity | Photo |
|---|---|---|---|
| Aberdeen | Pittodrie Stadium | 19,274 | |
| Celtic | Celtic Park | 60,411 | |
| Dundee | Dens Park | 11,775 | |
| Dundee United | Tannadice Park | 14,223 | |
| Falkirk | Falkirk Stadium | 7,937 | |
| Heart of Midlothian | Tynecastle Park | 19,852 | |
| Hibernian | Easter Road | 20,421 | |
| Kilmarnock | Rugby Park | 15,003 | |
| Livingston | Almondvale Stadium | 9,713 | |
| Motherwell | Fir Park | 13,677 | |
| Rangers | Ibrox Stadium | 51,700 | |
| St Mirren | St Mirren Park | 8,000 | |

=== Personnel and kits ===
| Team | Manager | Captain | Kit manufacturer | Shirt sponsor (front) | Shirt sponsor (back) | Shirt sponsor (sleeve) | Shorts sponsor |
|---|---|---|---|---|---|---|---|
| Aberdeen | (Northern Ireland) Stephen Robinson | (Scotland) Graeme Shinnie | Adidas | Texo Group | MaxAmaze, EIS Waste Services | RAM Tubulars | Texo Group |
| Celtic | (Northern Ireland) Martin O'Neill | (Scotland) Callum McGregor | Adidas | Dafabet | None | Celtic FC Foundation | None |
| Dundee | (Scotland) Steven Pressley | (Scotland) Simon Murray | Macron | Crown Engineering Services | MKM Building Supplies, John Clark BMW | GA Vans | DrainBlitz |
| Dundee United | (Republic of Ireland) Jim Goodwin | (Scotland) Ross Graham | Erreà | Quinn Casino | JF Kegs, Norman Jamieson Ltd | Trade-Mart | Paint-Tec Accident Repair Centre |
| Falkirk | (Scotland) John McGlynn | (Scotland) Coll Donaldson | O'Neills | Crunchy Carrots | Maniqui Nightclub (Home); Horizon Reinforcing & Crane Hire (Away) | Total Tickets | Water & Pipeline Services |
| Heart of Midlothian | (Scotland) Derek McInnes | (Scotland) Lawrence Shankland | Hummel | Stellar Omada | FanHub, loveholidays | ASC Edinburgh Ltd | None |
| Hibernian | (Scotland) David Gray | (England) Joe Newell | Joma | Bevvy.com | Whisky Row, Dunedin IT | SBK | Capital Credit Union |
| Kilmarnock | (Scotland) Neil McCann | (Northern Ireland) Brad Lyons | Hummel | James Frew Ltd | James Frew Ltd, Blackwood Plant Hire | Redrock Automation | A&L Mechanical |
| Livingston | (Canada) Scott Arfield (interim) | (Australia) Ryan McGowan | Joma | Livi Self Storage | Simply UK, Label 5 | The Centre Livingston | John Heaney Electrical |
| Motherwell | (Denmark) Jens Berthel Askou | (Scotland) Paul McGinn | Macron | G4 Claims | Fire Suppression Scotland, Kwiff | DX Home Improvements | TCL |
| Rangers | (Germany) Danny Röhl | (England) James Tavernier | Umbro | Unibet | SEKO Logistics, Pipeline Energy Solutions | BOXT Boilers | AIM Building and Maintenance |
| St Mirren | (Scotland) Craig McLeish (interim) | (Scotland) Mark O'Hara | Macron | Consilium | Ultimate Home Solutions, Macklin Motors | Gennaro Glass & Glazing | KPP Chartered Accountants |

=== Managerial changes ===
| Team | Outgoing manager | Manner of departure | Date of vacancy | Position in table | Incoming manager | Date of appointment |
|---|---|---|---|---|---|---|
| Rangers | (Scotland) Barry Ferguson | End of interim spell | 17 May 2025 | Pre-season | (Scotland) Russell Martin | 5 June 2025 |
| Heart of Midlothian | (Scotland) Liam Fox | End of interim spell | 18 May 2025 | Pre-season | (Scotland) Derek McInnes | 19 May 2025 |
| Dundee | (Scotland) Tony Docherty | Sacked | 19 May 2025 | Pre-season | (Scotland) Steven Pressley | 2 June 2025 |
| Kilmarnock | (Scotland) Derek McInnes | Joined Heart of Midlothian | 19 May 2025 | Pre-season | (Scotland) Stuart Kettlewell | 26 May 2025 |
| Motherwell | (Germany) Michael Wimmer | Joined Jahn Regensburg | 23 May 2025 | Pre-season | (Denmark) Jens Berthel Askou | 12 June 2025 |
| Rangers | (Scotland) Russell Martin | Sacked | 5 October 2025 | 8th | (Scotland) Steven Smith (interim) | 16 October 2025 |
| Rangers | (Scotland) Steven Smith | End of interim spell | 20 October 2025 | 6th | (Germany) Danny Röhl | 20 October 2025 |
| Celtic | (Northern Ireland) Brendan Rodgers | Resigned | 27 October 2025 | 2nd | (Northern Ireland) Martin O'Neill (interim) | 27 October 2025 |
| Celtic | (Northern Ireland) Martin O'Neill | End of interim spell | 4 December 2025 | 2nd | (France) Wilfried Nancy | 4 December 2025 |
| Kilmarnock | (Scotland) Stuart Kettlewell | Sacked | 15 December 2025 | 11th | (Scotland) Neil McCann | 6 January 2026 |
| Aberdeen | (Sweden) Jimmy Thelin | Sacked | 4 January 2026 | 8th | (Scotland) Peter Leven (interim) | 4 January 2026 |
| Celtic | (France) Wilfried Nancy | Sacked | 5 January 2026 | 2nd | (Northern Ireland) Martin O'Neill | 5 January 2026 |
| Livingston | (Scotland) David Martindale | Moved to Sporting Director | 1 February 2026 | 12th | (England) Marvin Bartley | 1 February 2026 |
| Aberdeen | (Scotland) Peter Leven | End of interim spell | 12 March 2026 | 9th | (Northern Ireland) Stephen Robinson | 12 March 2026 |
| St Mirren | (Northern Ireland) Stephen Robinson | Joined Aberdeen | 12 March 2026 | 10th | (Scotland) Craig McLeish (interim) | 12 March 2026 |
| Livingston | (England) Marvin Bartley | Resigned | 7 May 2026 | 12th | (Canada) Scott Arfield (interim) | 7 May 2026 |

== Format ==
In the initial phase of the season, the 12 teams played a round-robin tournament, whereby each team faced each one of the other teams three times. After 33 matches, the league was split into two sections of six teams, with each team playing each other in that section once. The league attempted to balance the fixture list so that teams in the same section played each other twice at home and twice away, but sometimes this was impossible. A total of 228 matches were played, with 38 matches played by each team.

== League table ==
| Pos | Team | Pld | W | D | L | GF | GA | GD | Pts | Qualification or relegation (Note: Teams played each other three times (33 matches), before the league was split into two groups (the top six and the bottom six).) |
|---|---|---|---|---|---|---|---|---|---|---|
| 1 | Celtic (C) | 38 | 26 | 4 | 8 | 73 | 41 | +32 | 82 | Qualification for the Champions League play-off round |
| 2 | Heart of Midlothian | 38 | 24 | 8 | 6 | 67 | 34 | +33 | 80 | Qualification for the Champions League second qualifying round |
| 3 | Rangers | 38 | 20 | 12 | 6 | 76 | 43 | +33 | 72 | Qualification for the Europa League third qualifying round (Note: Since the 2025–26 Scottish Cup winners, Celtic, qualified for the Champions League via league position, the spot reserved for the cup winners (Europa League third qualifying round) was passed to the third-placed team, and the spots for the Conference League second qualifying round were moved down one league position.) |
| 4 | Motherwell | 38 | 16 | 13 | 9 | 59 | 36 | +23 | 61 | Qualification for the Conference League second qualifying round |
| 5 | Hibernian | 38 | 15 | 12 | 11 | 58 | 44 | +14 | 57 | Qualification for the Conference League second qualifying round |
| 6 | Falkirk | 38 | 14 | 7 | 17 | 50 | 62 | −12 | 49 | |
| 7 | Dundee United | 38 | 10 | 15 | 13 | 49 | 60 | −11 | 45 | |
| 8 | Dundee | 38 | 11 | 9 | 18 | 42 | 61 | −19 | 42 | |
| 9 | Aberdeen | 38 | 11 | 7 | 20 | 40 | 55 | −15 | 40 | |
| 10 | Kilmarnock | 38 | 10 | 10 | 18 | 50 | 68 | −18 | 40 | |
| 11 | St Mirren (O) | 38 | 8 | 10 | 20 | 30 | 55 | −25 | 34 | Qualification for the Premiership play-off final |
| 12 | Livingston (R) | 38 | 2 | 15 | 21 | 40 | 75 | −35 | 21 | Relegation to Championship |

Rules for classification: 1) Points; 2) Goal difference; 3) Goals scored; 4) Head-to-head points; 5) Head-to-head goal difference; 6) Play-off (only if deciding champion, UEFA competition qualification, second stage group allocation, or relegation).
(C) Champions; (O) Play-off winners; (R) Relegated

== Results ==
=== Matches 1–33 ===
In matches 1–22, all teams played each other twice, once at home and once away. In matches 23–33, all teams played each other once, either home or away.

| Home \ Away | ABE | CEL | DND | DUN | FAL | HOM | HIB | KIL | LIV | MOT | RAN | STM | ABE | CEL | DND | DUN | FAL | HOM | HIB | KIL | LIV | MOT | RAN | STM |
|---|---|---|---|---|---|---|---|---|---|---|---|---|---|---|---|---|---|---|---|---|---|---|---|---|
| Aberdeen | — | 0–2 | 4–0 | 1–1 | 0–1 | 1–0 | 1–2 | 2–1 | 0–0 | 1–1 | 0–2 | 3–3 | — | 1–2 | 2–3 | — | 1–1 | — | 2–0 | — | 6–2 | — | — | — |
| Celtic | 3–1 | — | 1–0 | 4–0 | 4–0 | 1–2 | 0–0 | 4–0 | 3–0 | 3–2 | 1–3 | 1–0 | — | — | — | — | 2–0 | — | 1–2 | — | 2–1 | 3–1 | — | 1–0 |
| Dundee | 1–3 | 2–0 | — | 0–2 | 1–0 | 0–1 | 1–2 | 2–1 | 3–2 | 1–1 | 0–3 | 3–1 | — | 1–2 | — | 2–2 | — | — | 3–3 | — | 2–2 | 2–1 | — | — |
| Dundee United | 2–0 | 2–1 | 0–1 | — | 0–3 | 2–3 | 1–1 | 0–2 | 1–1 | 0–0 | 2–2 | 3–1 | 0–0 | 2–0 | — | — | — | 0–3 | — | 1–1 | 3–2 | — | — | 2–1 |
| Falkirk | 1–0 | 0–1 | 2–1 | 2–2 | — | 0–2 | 2–2 | 3–1 | 1–1 | 0–0 | 1–1 | 1–2 | — | — | 1–0 | 2–3 | — | — | 4–1 | 5–1 | — | — | 3–6 | 1–2 |
| Heart of Midlothian | 2–0 | 3–1 | 4–0 | 1–1 | 3–0 | — | 1–0 | 1–1 | 1–0 | 3–3 | 2–1 | 2–0 | 1–0 | 2–2 | 1–0 | — | 1–0 | — | 1–0 | — | — | 3–1 | — | — |
| Hibernian | 2–0 | 1–2 | 2–0 | 3–3 | 3–0 | 3–2 | — | 2–2 | 4–0 | 1–1 | 0–1 | 1–1 | — | — | — | 3–2 | — | — | — | 3–0 | 0–0 | — | 0–0 | 2–0 |
| Kilmarnock | 0–1 | 1–2 | 0–0 | 1–1 | 0–1 | 0–3 | 1–3 | — | 2–2 | 1–3 | 0–3 | 2–0 | 3–0 | 2–3 | 2–2 | — | — | 1–0 | — | — | 2–0 | — | — | 4–3 |
| Livingston | 0–1 | 2–4 | 2–2 | 1–3 | 3–1 | 1–2 | 2–2 | 1–1 | — | 1–2 | 1–2 | 1–1 | — | — | — | — | 1–2 | 2–2 | — | — | — | 0–2 | 2–2 | 1–1 |
| Motherwell | 2–0 | 2–0 | 1–0 | 2–0 | 1–2 | 0–0 | 2–0 | 2–2 | 3–0 | — | 1–1 | 2–0 | 2–0 | — | — | 2–0 | 2–3 | — | 0–0 | 4–0 | — | — | 1–1 | — |
| Rangers | 2–0 | 0–0 | 1–1 | 2–2 | 0–0 | 0–2 | 1–0 | 3–1 | 2–1 | 1–0 | — | 2–1 | 4–1 | 2–2 | 3–0 | 4–2 | — | 4–2 | — | 5–1 | — | — | — | — |
| St Mirren | 0–1 | 0–1 | 1–0 | 2–0 | 0–2 | 2–2 | 0–3 | 0–0 | 1–0 | 0–0 | 1–1 | — | 2–0 | — | 0–0 | — | — | 1–0 | — | — | — | 0–5 | 0–1 | — |

Legend: Blue = home team win; Yellow = draw; Red = away team win.

=== Matches 34–38 ===
After 33 matches, the league split into two sections of six teams, i.e. the top six and the bottom six, with the teams playing every other team in their section once (either at home or away). The exact matches were determined by the position of the teams in the league table at the time of the split.

==== Top 6 ====
| Home \ Away | CEL | FAL | HOM | HIB | MOT | RAN |
|---|---|---|---|---|---|---|
| Celtic | — | 3–1 | 3–1 | — | — | 3–1 |
| Falkirk | — | — | — | 1–3 | 1–0 | 2–5 |
| Heart of Midlothian | — | 3–0 | — | — | — | 2–1 |
| Hibernian | 1–2 | — | 1–2 | — | 0–1 | — |
| Motherwell | 2–3 | — | 1–1 | — | — | — |
| Rangers | — | — | — | 1–2 | 2–3 | — |

Legend: Blue = home team win; Yellow = draw; Red = away team win.

==== Bottom 6 ====
| Home \ Away | ABE | DND | DUN | KIL | LIV | STM |
|---|---|---|---|---|---|---|
| Aberdeen | — | — | 2–0 | 1–0 | — | 0–2 |
| Dundee | 3–2 | — | — | — | 3–0 | 1–0 |
| Dundee United | — | 3–0 | — | — | 0–0 | — |
| Kilmarnock | — | 3–1 | 3–0 | — | — | — |
| Livingston | 2–2 | — | — | 1–4 | — | — |
| St Mirren | — | — | 1–1 | 0–3 | 0–2 | — |

Legend: Blue = home team win; Yellow = draw; Red = away team win.

== Season statistics ==
=== Top scorers ===
| Rank | Player | Club | Goals |
|---|---|---|---|
| 1 | (Zimbabwe) Tawanda Maswanhise | Motherwell | 17 |
| 2 | (Sweden) Benjamin Nygren | Celtic | 16 |
| 2 | (Scotland) Lawrence Shankland | Heart of Midlothian | 16 |
| 4 | (Portugal) Youssef Chermiti | Rangers | 15 |
| 5 | (Portugal) Cláudio Braga | Heart of Midlothian | 14 |
| 5 | (Japan) Daizen Maeda | Celtic | 14 |
| 7 | (Scotland) Kevin Nisbet | Aberdeen | 9 |
| 7 | (Australia) Zac Sapsford | Dundee United | 9 |
| 9 | Ten players | | 8 |

==== Hat-tricks ====
| Player | For | Against | Score | Date | Ref. |
|---|---|---|---|---|---|
| (Scotland) Barney Stewart | Falkirk | Hibernian | 4–1 (H) | 24 January 2026 | |
| (England) Tyreece John-Jules | Kilmarnock | St Mirren | 4–3 (H) | 11 February 2026 | |
| (Portugal) Youssef Chermiti | Rangers | Heart of Midlothian | 4–2 (H) | 15 February 2026 | |
| (Portugal) Youssef Chermiti | Rangers | Falkirk | 5–2 (A) | 16 May 2026 | |

=== Clean sheets ===
| Rank | Player | Club | Clean sheets |
|---|---|---|---|
| 1 | (England) Calum Ward | Motherwell | 17 |
| 2 | (Germany) Alexander Schwolow | Heart of Midlothian | 15 |
| 3 | (England) Jack Butland | Rangers | 12 |
| 3 | (Denmark) Kasper Schmeichel | Celtic | 12 |
| 5 | (Austria) Raphael Sallinger | Hibernian | 11 |

== Awards ==
| Month | Manager of the Month | | Player of the Month | |
| Month | Manager | Club | Player | Club |
|---|---|---|---|---|
| August | (Scotland) Derek McInnes | Heart of Midlothian | (Croatia) Ivan Dolček | Dundee United |
| September | (Scotland) Derek McInnes | Heart of Midlothian | (Scotland) Lawrence Shankland | Heart of Midlothian |
| October | (Scotland) Derek McInnes | Heart of Midlothian | (Portugal) Cláudio Braga | Heart of Midlothian |
| November | (Northern Ireland) Martin O'Neill | Celtic | (Zimbabwe) Tawanda Maswanhise | Motherwell |
| December | (Denmark) Jens Berthel Askou | Motherwell | (Scotland) Elliott Watt | Motherwell |
| January | (Germany) Danny Röhl | Rangers | (Zimbabwe) Tawanda Maswanhise | Motherwell |
| February | (Denmark) Jens Berthel Askou | Motherwell | (Portugal) Youssef Chermiti | Rangers |
| March | (Republic of Ireland) Jim Goodwin | Dundee United | (Scotland) Barney Stewart | Falkirk |
| April | (Northern Ireland) Martin O'Neill | Celtic | (Republic of Ireland) Will Ferry | Dundee United |

=== Annual awards ===
| Award | Winner | Club |
|---|---|---|
| PFA Scotland Premiership Player of the Year | (Portugal) Cláudio Braga | Heart of Midlothian |
| PFA Scotland SPFL Young Player of the Year | (England) Mikey Moore | Rangers |
| PFA Scotland SPFL Manager of the Year | (Scotland) Derek McInnes | Heart of Midlothian |
| PFA Scotland Goal of the Season | (Portugal) Youssef Chermiti | Rangers |

PFA Scotland Team of the Year
| Goalkeeper | (England) Calum Ward (Motherwell) | | | |
| Defenders | (Scotland) Paul McGinn (Motherwell) | (Scotland) Craig Halkett (Heart of Midlothian) | (Nigeria) Emmanuel Fernandez (Rangers) | (Scotland) Harry Milne (Heart of Midlothian) |
| Midfielders | (Sweden) Benjamin Nygren (Celtic) | | (Scotland) Elliot Watt (Motherwell) | (New Zealand) Elijah Just (Motherwell) |
| Forwards | (Zimbabwe) Tawanda Maswanhise (Motherwell) | | (Scotland) Lawrence Shankland (Heart of Midlothian) | (Portugal) Claudio Braga (Heart of Midlothian) |

== Premiership play-offs ==
The quarter-final was contested by the teams placed third and fourth in the 2025–26 Scottish Championship, Arbroath and Dunfermline Athletic. Dunfermline advanced to the semi-final to face the team placed second in the Championship, Partick Thistle. The final was contested by the semi-final winner, Partick Thistle, and the team placed eleventh in the Premiership, St Mirren, with St Mirren securing a place in the 2026–27 Scottish Premiership.

=== Qualified teams ===
| Team | Rank |
|---|---|
| St Mirren | 1 |
| Partick Thistle | 2 |
| Arbroath | 3 |
| Dunfermline Athletic | 4 |

Quarter-final
3 | Arbroath | 0 | 0 | 0
4 | Dunfermline Athletic | 1 | 0 | 1

Semi-final
2 | Partick Thistle | 2 | 1 | 3
4 | Dunfermline Athletic | 1 | 1 | 2

Final
1 | St Mirren | 1 | 1 | 2
2 | Partick Thistle | 1 | 0 | 1

=== Quarter-final ===
==== First leg ====
| 5 May 2026 | Dunfermline Athletic | 1–0 | Arbroath | Dunfermline |
| 19:45 | Kane 7' | | | Stadium: East End Park; Attendance: 5,079; Referee: Ryan Lee |

==== Second leg ====
| 8 May 2026 | Arbroath | 0–0 (0–1 agg.) | Dunfermline Athletic | Arbroath |
| 19:30 | | | | Stadium: Gayfield Park; Attendance: 3,689; Referee: David Dickinson |

=== Semi-final ===
==== First leg ====
| 12 May 2026 | Dunfermline Athletic | 1–1 | Partick Thistle | Dunfermline |
| 19:45 | Morrison 23' | | Stanway 24' | Stadium: East End Park; Attendance: 6,873; Referee: Duncan Nicolson |

==== Second leg ====
| 15 May 2026 | Partick Thistle | 2–1 (3–2 agg.) | Dunfermline Athletic | Glasgow |
| 19:45 | Chalmers 50'; Samuel 75' | | Gilmour 34' | Stadium: Firhill Stadium; Attendance: 8,044; Referee: Calum Scott |

=== Final ===
==== First leg ====
| 21 May 2026 | Partick Thistle | 1–1 | St Mirren | Glasgow |
| 20:00 | Fitzpatrick 62' | | Phillips 39' | Stadium: Firhill Stadium; Attendance: 8,323; Referee: Ryan Lee |

==== Second leg ====
| 25 May 2026 | St Mirren | 1–0 (2–1 agg.) | Partick Thistle | Paisley |
| 20:00 | Fraser 65' | | | Stadium: St Mirren Park; Attendance: 7,472; Referee: Nick Walsh |
