= Elliot Watt =

Scottish footballer (born 2000)

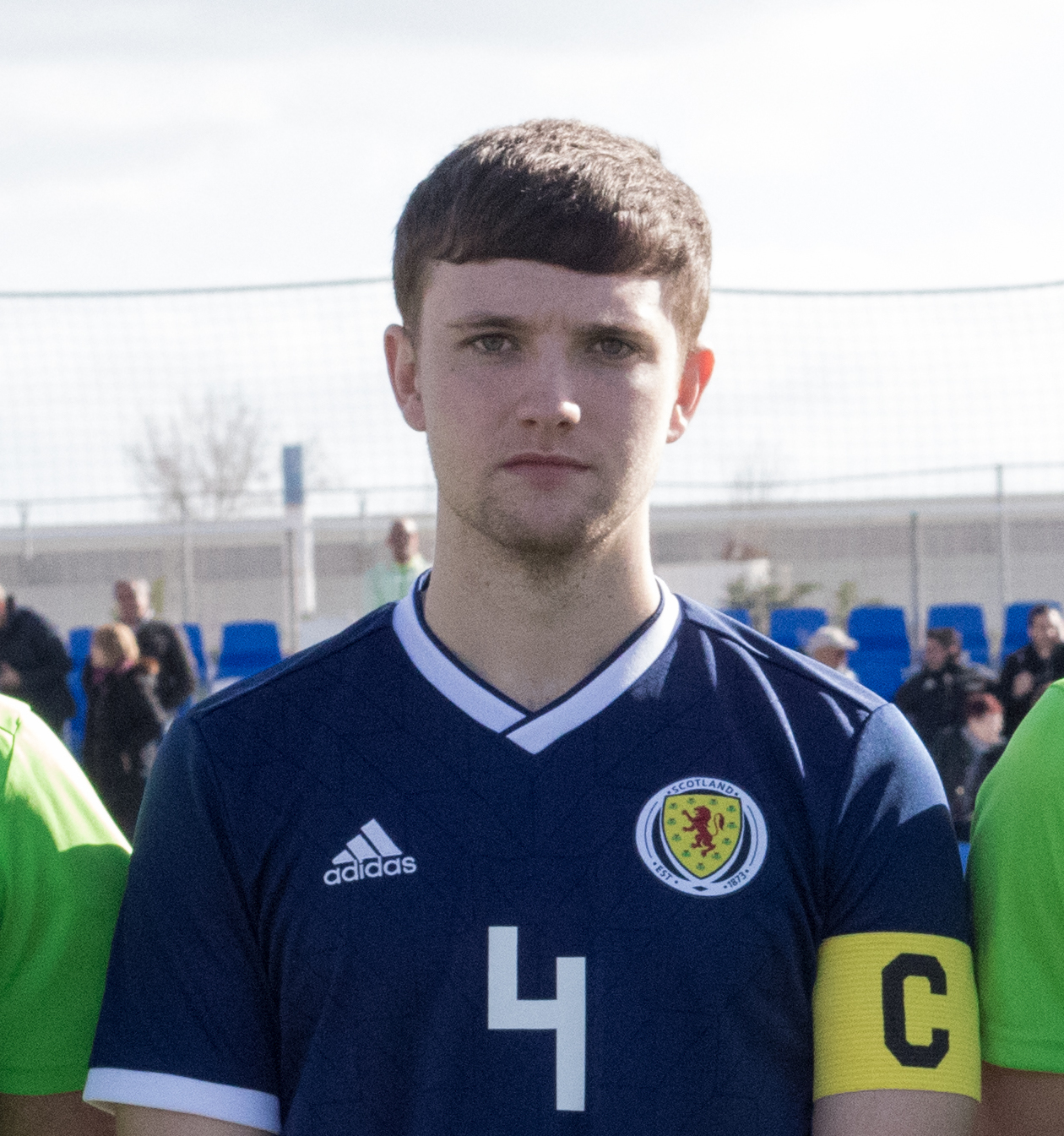
- Watt playing for Scotland under-19s in 2019

Personal information
- Full name: Elliot William Watt
- Date of birth: 11 March 2000 (age 26)
- Place of birth: Preston, England
- Height: 1.75 m (5 ft 9 in)
- Position: Midfielder

Team information
- Current team: Samsunspor
- Number: 4

Youth career
- Liverpool
- Blackburn Rovers
- Preston North End
- 2016–2018: Wolverhampton Wanderers

Senior career*
Years	Team	Apps	(Gls)
2018–2020	Wolverhampton Wanderers	0	(0)
2020	→ Carlisle United (loan)	12	(1)
2020–2022	Bradford City	87	(5)
2022–2024	Salford City	82	(1)
2024–2025	Burton Albion	25	(0)
2025	→ St Johnstone (loan)	8	(2)
2025–2026	Motherwell	34	(6)
2026–	Samsunspor	8	(0)

International career^{‡}
2017	Scotland U17	6	(0)
2018–2019	Scotland U19	14	(2)
2018	Scotland U21	3	(0)
- * Club domestic league appearances and goals as of 13 November 2026 ‡ National team caps and goals as of 20 March 2019 (UTC)

Elliot William Watt (born 11 March 2000) is a Scottish professional footballer who plays as a midfielder for Süper Lig club Samsunspor.

Watt began his career in the youth academies of Liverpool, Blackburn Rovers, Preston North End, and Wolverhampton Wanderers. With Wolves, he made his professional debut, and spent time on loan at Carlisle United. He signed for Bradford City in 2020, spending two years with the club before departing for Salford City. In 2024, he signed for Burton Albion who subsequently loaded him to St Johnstone.

Born in Preston, Watt has represented Scotland internationally for the U17s, U19s, and U21s, and participated in the 2018 Toulon Tournament.

== Club career ==
=== Early career ===
Watt began his career at Liverpool before moving to Blackburn Rovers due to travelling problems. He then moved to hometown club Preston North End. He signed his first professional contract with Wolverhampton Wanderers in November 2017.

He made his Wolves debut on 28 August 2018 in the EFL Cup against Sheffield Wednesday at Hillsborough, starting in the 2–0 second round win. He was replaced on 62 minutes by future Portuguese international Pedro Goncalves.

On 1 January 2020, Watt joined Carlisle United on loan until the end of the season. His first appearance for the club was in a 2–2 draw against Cardiff City in the FA Cup, playing the full 90 minutes.

=== Bradford City ===
On 27 July 2020, Watt joined League Two side Bradford City on a two-year deal for an undisclosed fee. In November 2020 he was one of a number of young Bradford City players playing in the first team who were praised by manager Stuart McCall. He was one of seven players offered a new contract by Bradford City at the end of the 2021–22 season.

=== Salford City ===
On 27 June 2022, it was announced that he would sign for fellow League Two side Salford City, signing a two-year contract. Along with teammate Ibou Touray, Watt was named in the EFL League Two Team of the Season for the 2022–23 season.

=== Burton Albion ===
On 12 June 2024, English EFL League One club Burton Albion announced that they had agreed terms to sign Watt following the expiry of his contract at Salford.

==== St Johnstone loan ====
On 30 January 2025, Watt joined Scottish Premiership side St Johnstone on loan for the remainder of the season.

=== Motherwell ===
On 26 June 2025, Watt terminated his contract with Burton Albion by mutual consent. That allowed Watt to join his second Scottish Premiership club, Motherwell, on an initial two-year deal. His form during the first half of the season attracted interest from Rangers during the January transfer window.

=== Samsunspor ===
On 18 July 2026, Watt joined Süper Lig club Samsunspor on a four-year contract for an undisclosed fee.

== International career ==
Aged 18, Watt was selected by head coach Scot Gemmill to the Scotland U21 squad for the 2018 Toulon Tournament. The team lost to Turkey in a penalty shoot-out and finished fourth.

== Career statistics ==
As of matches played 2 January 2026

Club	Season	League			FA Cup		League Cup		Other		Total	
Club	Season	Division	Apps	Goals	Apps	Goals	Apps	Goals	Apps	Goals	Apps	Goals
Wolverhampton Wanderers	2018–19	Premier League	0	0	0	0	1	0	1 (Note: Appearance(s) in EFL Trophy)	0	2	0
Wolverhampton Wanderers	2019–20	Premier League	0	0	0	0	0	0	4	1	4	1
Wolverhampton Wanderers	Total		0	0	0	0	1	0	5	1	6	1
Carlisle United (loan)	2019–20	League Two	12	1	2	0	0	0	0	0	14	1
Bradford City	2020–21	League Two	46	3	2	0	2	0	0	0	50	3
Bradford City	2021–22	League Two	41	2	2	0	1	0	2	0	46	2
Bradford City	Total		87	5	4	0	3	0	2	0	96	5
Salford City	2022–23	League Two	46	0	2	0	1	0	3	0	47	0
Salford City	2023–24	League Two	36	1	2	0	1	0	0	0	39	1
Salford City	Total		82	1	4	0	2	0	3	0	86	1
Burton Albion	2024–25	League One	25	0	2	0	1	0	2	0	30	0
St Johnstone (loan)	2024–25	Scottish Premiership	8	2	1	0	0	0	0	0	9	2
Motherwell	2025–26	Scottish Premiership	20	4	0	0	7	0	0	0	27	4
Career total			234	13	13	0	11	0	12	1	268	17

== Honours ==
Individual

- EFL League Two Team of the Season: 2022–23
- PFA Team of the Year: 2022–23 League Two
- PFA League Two Fans' Player of the Year: 2022–23
