= Emmanuel Longelo =

English footballer (born 2000)

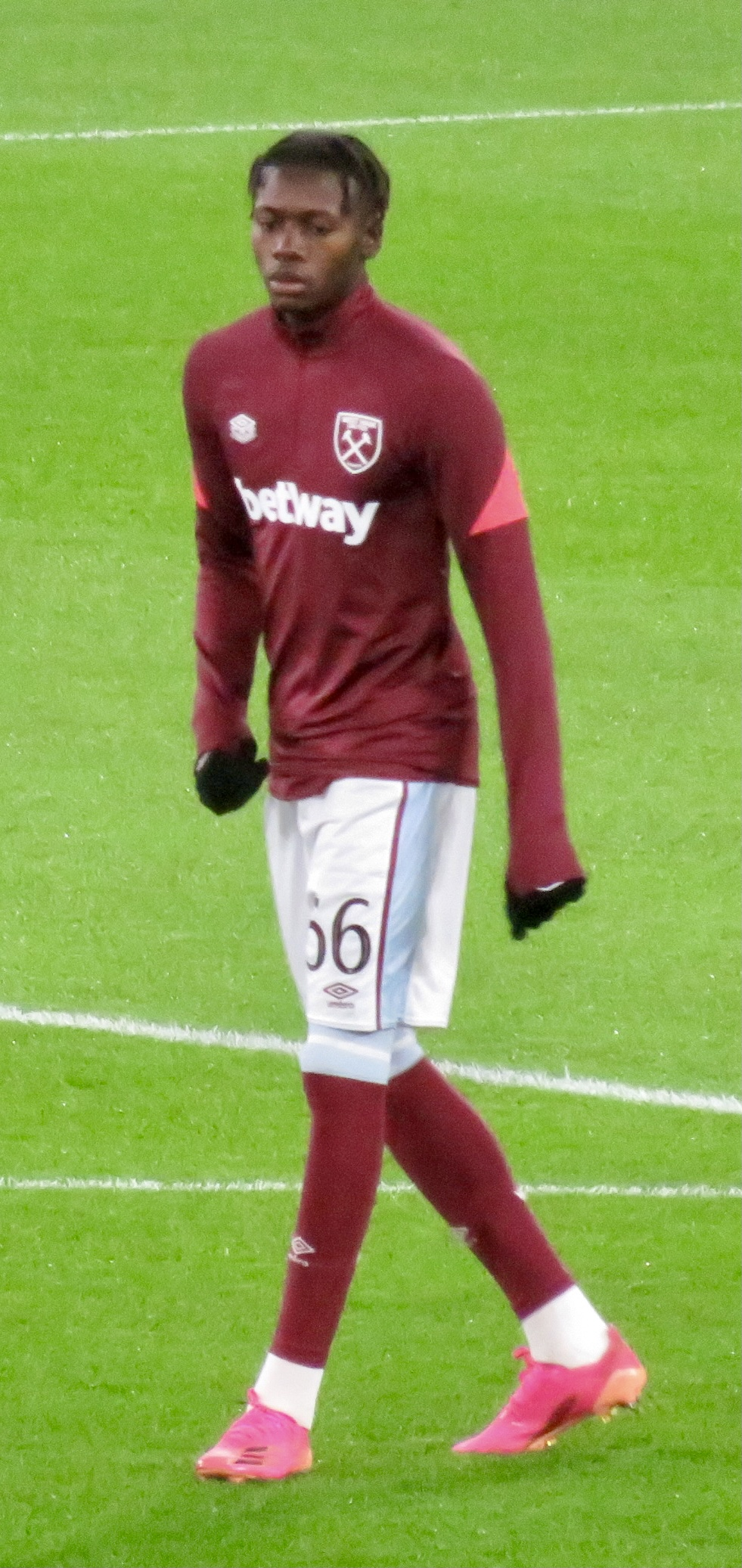
- Longelo warming up for West Ham United in 2021

Personal information
- Full name: Emmanuel Longelo Mbule
- Date of birth: 27 December 2000 (age 25)
- Place of birth: Barking, England
- Height: 6 ft 0 in (1.84 m)
- Positions: Left back; wing-back; left winger

Team information
- Current team: Motherwell
- Number: 45

Youth career
- –2020: West Ham United

Senior career*
| Years | Team | Apps | (Gls) |
| 2020–2023 | West Ham United | 0 | (0) |
| 2022–2023 | → Birmingham City (loan) | 15 | (1) |
| 2023–2025 | Birmingham City | 25 | (0) |
| 2024–2025 | → Cambridge United (loan) | 15 | (1) |
| 2025– | Motherwell | 36 | (8) |
- * Club domestic league appearances and goals as of 20 May 2026

Emmanuel Longelo Mbule (born 27 December 2000) is an English professional footballer who plays as a left back for Scottish Premiership club Motherwell. Longelo began his career with West Ham United and played first-team football in the EFL Cup and the Europa League before joining Birmingham City, initially on loan, in 2022. He spent the 2024–25 season on loan at Cambridge United.

== Club career ==
=== West Ham United ===
Longelo started playing Sunday league football as a nine-year old for Euro Dagenham. He joined West Ham United's under-10 side playing as a midfielder and scored five goals on his debut, against Chelsea. Due to his pace he was moved to play as a striker. Playing for West Ham's under-23 team, Longelo played as a left-back. On 21 September 2020, Longelo made his debut for West Ham in a 5–1 EFL Cup win against Hull City.

=== Birmingham City ===
He joined Birmingham City on a season-long loan on 30 August 2022. After recovering from injuries suffered earlier in the season, he made his debut on 1 October, starting at left wing-back in a 1–1 draw away to Championship leaders Sheffield United. In a 2–0 win over Queens Park Rangers on 28 October, he "received the ball on the left, twisted and turned past Ethan Laird and then found the bottom-right corner with a low curling finish" to score his first senior goal, and later gave away a penalty which was saved by John Ruddy.

Longelo signed a three-and-a-half-year contract with Birmingham City on 31 January 2023. The fee, officially undisclosed, was reported by football.london as £400,000. He lost his place for a time, but came back into the team at the end of the season, which he finished with 23 league appearances. He began the 2023–24 season as a regular in the matchday squad, and he and Cody Drameh had a run in the starting eleven when both full back, Ethan Laird and Lee Buchanan, were injured at the same time. When Laird regained fitness, it was Longelo who lost the starting place, and after Wayne Rooney was replaced as manager in January 2024, he did not play in the league again.

==== Loan to Cambridge United ====
Longelo was not given a squad number by Birmingham at the start of the 2024–25 League One season, and after a proposed move to Barnsley fell through, he joined Birmingham's divisional rivals Cambridge United on 22 August 2024 on loan for the season. He made 19 appearances, scoring twice, in all competitions.

=== Motherwell ===
On 10 July 2025, Longelo moved to Scottish Premiership club Motherwell for an undisclosed fee, signing a two year deal through 2027, with the option of a further year to extend the contract through 2028.

== Personal life ==
Longelo was born in Barking, London, and is of Congolese descent. His older brother, Rosaire, played alongside him at West Ham before joining Newcastle United.

== Career statistics ==
As of end of 2024–25 season

Appearances and goals by club, season and competition
| Club | Season | League | | | FA Cup | | League Cup | | Other | | Total | |
| Club | Season | Division | Apps | Goals | Apps | Goals | Apps | Goals | Apps | Goals | Apps | Goals |
|---|---|---|---|---|---|---|---|---|---|---|---|---|
| West Ham United U23 | 2018–19 | — | — | | — | | — | | 2 (Note: Appearances in EFL Trophy) | 0 | 2 | 0 |
| West Ham United U23 | 2019–20 | — | — | | — | | — | | 2 | 0 | 2 | 0 |
| West Ham United U23 | 2020–21 | — | — | | — | | — | | 4 | 0 | 4 | 0 |
| West Ham United U23 | 2021–22 | — | — | | — | | — | | 3 | 0 | 3 | 0 |
| West Ham United U23 | Total | | — | | — | | — | | 11 | 0 | 11 | 0 |
| West Ham United | 2020–21 | Premier League | 0 | 0 | 0 | 0 | 1 | 0 | 0 | 0 | 1 | 0 |
| West Ham United | 2021–22 | Premier League | 0 | 0 | 0 | 0 | 0 | 0 | 1 (Note: Appearance in UEFA Europa League) | 0 | 1 | 0 |
| West Ham United | 2022–23 | Premier League | 0 | 0 | 0 | 0 | 0 | 0 | 0 | 0 | 0 | 0 |
| West Ham United | Total | | 0 | 0 | 0 | 0 | 1 | 0 | 1 | 0 | 2 | 0 |
| Birmingham City | 2022–23 (Note: Longelo spent the first half of the 2022–23 season on loan from West Ham United.) | Championship | 23 | 1 | 2 | 0 | — | | — | | 25 | 1 |
| Birmingham City | 2023–24 | Championship | 17 | 0 | 1 | 0 | 2 | 0 | — | | 20 | 0 |
| Birmingham City | 2024–25 | League One | 0 | 0 | 0 | 0 | 0 | 0 | — | | 0 | 0 |
| Birmingham City | Total | | 40 | 1 | 3 | 0 | 2 | 0 | — | | 45 | 1 |
| Cambridge United (loan) | 2024–25 (Note: Soccerbase currently lists Longelo as an unused substitute for the FA Cup tie against Wigan Athletic on 30 November; he came on during extra time.) | League One | 15 | 1 | 1 | 0 | — | | 3 | 1 | 19 | 2 |
| Career total | | | 55 | 2 | 4 | 0 | 3 | 0 | 15 | 1 | 77 | 3 |
