= Motherwell F.C. in European football =

Scottish club in European football

Motherwell in European football
- Club: Motherwell
- First entry: 1991–92 European Cup Winners' Cup
- Latest entry: 2026–27 UEFA Conference League

Titles
- Champions League: 0 (Best: Third qualifying round)
- Europa League: 0 (Best: Play-off round)
- Cup Winners' Cup: 0 (Best: First round)
- Conference League: 0 (Best: Second qualifying round)

Motherwell Football Club is a Scottish football club based in the town of Motherwell, North Lanarkshire. The club first competed in a European competition in 1991–92, qualifying for the European Cup Winners' Cup as winners of the 1991 Scottish Cup. The club have reached the play-off round of the UEFA Europa League twice (2010 and 2012), which remain Motherwell's two best runs in a European competition.

== History ==
=== 1990s ===
Motherwell qualified for a UEFA competition for the first time in 1991–92 after winning the Scottish Cup the previous season. Their opponents were GKS Katowice from Poland. They won the home leg 3–1, but lost the away tie 2–0, resulting in elimination on away goals.

Motherwell qualified for the UEFA Cup for the first time in 1994–95 having finished third in the 1993–94 Scottish Premier Division the previous season. They faced HB Torshavn of the Faroe Islands in the preliminary round, and advanced to the next round winning by an aggregate score of 7-1 after a 3–0 home leg win. In the first round proper, they faced German giants Borussia Dortmund. They lost the first leg away 1-0 and lost the home second leg 2–0, losing 3–0 on aggregate. Motherwell finished second behind Rangers in the 1994–95 Scottish Premier Division, leading to qualification for the preliminary round of the UEFA Cup. They faced MYPA of Finland, but lost the first leg 3–1 at home. A 2–0 away win was not enough for Motherwell to advance and they were eliminated on the away goals rule.

=== 2008–15 ===
After a 13-year absence, Motherwell returned to European football by finishing third in the 2007-08 Scottish Premier League. They were drawn to face Nancy of France in the first round proper. After losing the first leg 1–0 at the Stade Marcel Picot, they then lost the second leg 2–0 at home, losing 3–0 on aggregate. Motherwell qualified for Europe for a second straight season after winning a place through the Fair Play League, despite finishing 7th the previous season. They were the first ever Scottish entrant to the newly formed Europa League. Also, due to extensive remedial work on their Fir Park surface, Motherwell played all of their home European matches at Excelsior Stadium in Airdrie. They were drawn to face Welsh Premier League side Llanelli in the first qualifying round. They suffered a shock 1–0 home first leg defeat, but recovered to win the away leg 3–0 at the Parc y Scarlets. In the next round they met Flamurtari of Albania, but lost the first leg 1–0 away. Just like in the previous round, they recovered by hammering the Albanians 8–1 at home in the second, a score that stands as a record club European victory to this day. They advanced to the third qualifying round for a meeting with Romanian heavyweights Steaua București. They lost the first leg 3–0 away at the Stadionul Steaua, and the second leg 3–1 at home. and were eliminated 6–1 on aggregate.

A fifth-place finish in the 2010–11 Scottish Premier League saw Motherwell qualify for Europe for a third straight season. They were to play teams only from the Nordic countries during that season's run. They first played Icelandic club Breiðablik in the second qualifying round, winning both legs 1–0 to advance to the third qualifying round. They would then be paired with Aalesund of Norway, and drew the first leg away 1-1, their only draw in European football, before winning the second leg 3–0 at Fir Park. They were in the Europa League play-offs, the furthest they have gone in European competition, and would play Danish outfit Odense. They lost the first leg away 2–1, and lost the home second leg 1–0 to bow out of Europe for another season.

Motherwell qualified for the Champions League for the first time in 2012, being placed in the third qualifying round. They took the place of Rangers who were in administration and were not allowed to participate. Motherwell were in the non-champions section of the draw, and were paired with Greek giants Panathinaikos. They lost the first leg 2–0 at Fir Park, and went on to lose the second leg 3–0 at the Olympic Stadium in Athens. Motherwell's elimination from the Champions League saw them parachuted into the Europa League play-off round, where they would face Levante of Spain. After losing the home leg 2–0, they then lost the second leg 1–0 away in Valencia to bow out of Europe 3–0 on aggregate and without scoring a single goal overall. They did, however, equal their longest participation in European competition.

Motherwell finished the 2012–13 Scottish Premier League in second place, and with champions Celtic winning the 2012–13 Scottish Cup, Motherwell moved into the third qualifying round of the Europa League. They were un-seeded in that draw and were paired with Kuban Krasnodar of Russia. They lost the first-leg 2–0 at Fir Park, suffering a 1–0 defeat in the return leg to exit European competition. Motherwell finished the 2013–14 Scottish Premiership in second place, meaning Motherwell began in the second qualifying round of the Europa League. They were seeded in that draw and were paired with Stjarnan of Iceland. They drew the first-leg 2–2 at Fir Park, suffering a 3–2 extra time defeat in the return leg which confirmed elimination from that season's competition.

== Overall record ==
=== Matches ===
List of Motherwell games in European competitions
Season	Competition	Round	Opponent	Home	Away	Other	Agg.	(Note: Round or group progressed or eliminated)	Notes	Ref.
1991–92	Cup Winners' Cup	1R	(Poland) GKS Katowice	3–1	0–2	—N/a	3–3		Away goals	
1994–95	UEFA Cup	PR	(Faroe Islands) HB Torshavn	3–0	4–1	—N/a	7–1		—N/a	
1994–95	UEFA Cup	1R	(Germany) Borussia Dortmund	0–2	0–1	—N/a	0–3		—N/a	
1995–96	UEFA Cup	PR	(Finland) MyPA-47	1–3	2–0	—N/a	3–3		Away goals	
2008–09	UEFA Cup	1R	(France) Nancy	0–2	0–1	—N/a	0–3		—N/a	
2009–10	Europa League	1QR	(Wales) Llanelli	0–1	3–0	—N/a	3–1		—N/a	
2009–10	Europa League	2QR	(Albania) Flamurtari	8–1	0–1	—N/a	8–2		—N/a	
2009–10	Europa League	3QR	(Romania) Steaua București	1–3	0–3	—N/a	1–6		—N/a	
2010–11	Europa League	2QR	(Iceland) Breiðablik	1–0	1–0	—N/a	2–0		—N/a	
2010–11	Europa League	3QR	(Norway) Aalesund	3–0	1–1	—N/a	4–1		—N/a	
2010–11	Europa League	PO	(Denmark) Odense	0–1	1–2	—N/a	1–3		—N/a	
2012–13	Champions League	3QR	(Greece) Panathinaikos	0–2	0–3	—N/a	0–5		—N/a	
2012–13	Europa League	PO	(Spain) Levante	0–2	0–1	—N/a	0–3		—N/a	
2013–14	Europa League	3QR	(Russia) Kuban Krasnodar	0–2	0–1	—N/a	0–3		—N/a	
2014–15	Europa League	2QR	(Iceland) Stjarnan	2–2	2–3	—N/a	4–5		Extra time	
2020–21	Europa League	1QR	(Northern Ireland) Glentoran	5−1	—N/a	—N/a	—N/a		—N/a	
2020–21	Europa League	2QR	(Northern Ireland) Coleraine	—N/a	2−2	—N/a	—N/a		Penalties	
2020–21	Europa League	3QR	(Israel) Hapoel Be'er Sheva	—N/a	0−3	—N/a	—N/a		—N/a	
2022–23	Europa Conference League	2QR	(Republic of Ireland) Sligo Rovers	0−1	0–2	—N/a	0–3		—N/a	
2026–27	Conference League	2QR	(Faroe Islands) HB	2−0	3−0	—N/a	5−0		—N/a	
2026–27	Conference League	3QR	(Finland) HJK	2−0	1−1	—N/a	3−1		—N/a	
2026–27	Conference League	PO	(Germany) SC Freiburg	1–3	1–4	—N/a	2–7		—N/a	

=== By competition ===
Competition	Pld	W	D	L	GF	GA	GD	%
European Cup / Champions League	2	0	0	2	0	5	−5	0.00
UEFA Cup / Europa League	29	9	3	17	40	40	+0	31.03
Conference League	8	3	1	4	10	11	−1	37.50
UEFA Cup Winners' Cup	2	1	0	1	3	3	+0	50.00
Totals	41	13	4	24	53	59	−6	31.71

=== By country ===
Country	Pld	W	D	L	GF	GA	GD	Win%
Albania	2	1	0	1	8	2	+6	50.00
Denmark	2	0	0	2	1	3	−2	0.00
Faroe Islands	4	4	0	0	12	1	+11	100.00
Finland	4	2	1	1	6	4	+2	50.00
France	2	0	0	2	0	3	−3	0.00
Germany	4	0	0	4	2	10	−8	0.00
Greece	2	0	0	2	0	5	−5	0.00
Iceland	4	2	1	1	6	5	+1	50.00
Israel	1	0	0	1	0	3	−3	0.00
Northern Ireland	2	1	1	0	7	3	+4	50.00
Norway	2	1	1	0	4	1	+3	50.00
Poland	2	1	0	1	3	3	+0	50.00
Republic of Ireland	2	0	0	2	0	3	−3	0.00
Romania	2	0	0	2	1	6	−5	0.00
Russia	2	0	0	2	0	3	−3	0.00
Spain	2	0	0	2	0	3	−3	0.00
Wales	2	1	0	1	3	1	+2	50.00
Total	40	13	4	23	52	55	−3	32.50

== Player statistics ==
=== Appearances ===
As of match played 27 August 2026

Rank	Player	Years	Cup Winners' Cup	Champions League	UEFA Cup	Europa League	Conference League	Total	Ratio
1	(Scotland) Steven Hammell	1999–2006; 2008–2018	(-)	2 (0)	2 (0)	17 (1)	(-)	21 (1)	0.05
2	(Scotland) Keith Lasley	1999–2004; 2006–2017	(-)	2 (0)	2 (0)	16 (0)	(-)	20 (0)	0
3	(Scotland) Jamie Murphy	2006–2013	(-)	2 (0)	2 (0)	14 (7)	(-)	18 (7)	0.39
4	(England) John Sutton	2008–2011; 2013–2015	(-)	(-)	2 (0)	15 (3)	(-)	17 (3)	0.18
5	(Scotland) Mark Reynolds	2005–2011	(-)	(-)	2 (0)	12 (0)	(-)	14 (0)	0
5	(Northern Ireland) Stephen Craigan	1995–2000; 2003–2012	(-)	(-)	2 (0)	12 (0)	(-)	14 (0)	0
7	(Jamaica) Chris Humphrey	2009–2013	(-)	1 (0)	(-)	11 (0)	(-)	12 (0)	0
8	(Scotland) Steven Saunders	2008–2013	(-)	(-)	(-)	10 (0)	(-)	10 (0)	0
8	(Scotland) Ross Forbes	2007–2012	(-)	(-)	(-)	10 (4)	(-)	10 (4)	0.4
8	(Republic of Ireland) Darren Randolph	2010–2013	(-)	2 (0)	(-)	8 (0)	(-)	10 (0)	0
8	(Scotland) Bob McHugh	2007–2015	(-)	1 (0)	(-)	9 (1)	(-)	10 (1)	0.1
12	(England) Tom Hateley	2009–2013	(-)	2 (0)	(-)	7 (1)	(-)	9 (1)	0.11
13	(Scotland) Jamie Dolan	1987–1997	2 (0)	(-)	6 (0)	(-)	(-)	8 (0)	0
13	(England) Steve Jennings	2009–2012	(-)	(-)	(-)	8 (0)	(-)	8 (0)	0
13	(England) Shaun Hutchinson	2009–2014	(-)	2 (0)	(-)	6 (1)	(-)	8 (1)	0.13
16	(Scotland) John Philliben	1986–1998	2 (0)	(-)	4 (0)	(-)	(-)	6 (0)	0
16	(Scotland) Steve Kirk	1986–1995	2 (2)	(-)	4 (3)	(-)	(-)	6 (5)	0.83
16	(Scotland) Brian Martin	1991–1998	(-)	(-)	6 (0)	(-)	(-)	6 (0)	0
16	(Scotland) Chris McCart	1985–1997	(-)	(-)	6 (0)	(-)	(-)	6 (0)	0
16	(Scotland) Billy Davies	1993–1998	(-)	(-)	6 (1)	(-)	(-)	6 (1)	0.17
16	(Scotland) Jim O'Brien	2008–2010	(-)	(-)	(-)	6 (0)	(-)	6 (0)	0
16	(Scotland) Paul Slane	2009–2010	(-)	(-)	(-)	6 (1)	(-)	6 (1)	0.17
16	(England) Simon Ramsden	2012–2015	(-)	2 (0)	(-)	4 (0)	(-)	6 (0)	0
16	(Scotland) Fraser Kerr	2012–2013; 2013–2015	(-)	1 (-)	(-)	5 (0)	(-)	6 (0)	0
16	(New Zealand) Alex Paulsen	2026–present	(-)	(-)	(-)	(-)	6 (0)	6 (0)	0
16	(Australia) Jake Girdwood-Reich	2026–present	(-)	(-)	(-)	(-)	6 (0)	6 (0)	0
16	(England) Emmanuel Longelo	2025–present	(-)	(-)	(-)	(-)	6 (1)	6 (1)	0.17
16	(Austria) Lukas Fadinger	2025–present	(-)	(-)	(-)	(-)	6 (2)	6 (2)	0.33
16	(Grenada) Regan Charles-Cook	2025–present	(-)	(-)	(-)	(-)	6 (2)	6 (2)	0.33
16	(Switzerland) Willy Vogt	2026–present	(-)	(-)	(-)	(-)	6 (0)	6 (0)	0
16	(Scotland) Olly Whyte	2023–present	(-)	(-)	(-)	(-)	6 (0)	6 (0)	0
32	(England) Jonathan Page	2008–2012	(-)	(-)	(-)	5 (1)	(-)	5 (1)	0.2
32	(Scotland) Stevie Woods	1994–2003	(-)	(-)	5 (0)	(-)	(-)	5 (0)	0
32	(Scotland) Rob McKinnon	1992–1996	(-)	(-)	5 (0)	(-)	(-)	5 (0)	0
32	(Scotland) Paul Lambert	1993–1996	(-)	(-)	5 (0)	(-)	(-)	5 (0)	0
32	(Scotland) Stuart Carswell	2011–2015	(-)	1 (-)	(-)	4 (0)	(-)	5 (0)	0
32	(Antigua and Barbuda) Zaine Francis-Angol	2011–2015	(-)	1 (0)	(-)	4 (0)	(-)	5 (0)	0
32	(Scotland) Ricki Lamie	2020–2024	(-)	(-)	(-)	3 (0)	2 (0)	5 (0)	0
32	(Austria) Martin Moormann	2026–present	(-)	(-)	(-)	(-)	5 (1)	5 (1)	0.2
32	(Scotland) Ewan Wilson	2022–present	(-)	(-)	(-)	(-)	5 (0)	5 (0)	0
32	(Nigeria) Ibrahim Said	2025–present	(-)	(-)	(-)	(-)	5 (2)	5 (2)	0.4
32	(Zimbabwe) Tawanda Maswanhise	2025–present	(-)	(-)	(-)	(-)	5 (1)	5 (1)	0.2
43	(Scotland) Rab Shannon	1993–1995	(-)	(-)	4 (0)	(-)	(-)	4 (0)	0
43	(Republic of Ireland) Tommy Coyne	1993–1998	(-)	(-)	4 (1)	(-)	(-)	4 (1)	0.25
43	(Scotland) Michael Fraser	2009–2010	(-)	(-)	(-)	4 (0)	(-)	4 (0)	0
43	(Scotland) Steven McGarry	2006–2010	(-)	(-)	1 (0)	3 (0)	(-)	4 (0)	0
43	(England) Michael Higdon	2011–2013	(-)	2 (0)	(-)	2 (0)	(-)	4 (0)	0
43	(Estonia) Henrik Ojamaa	2012–2013; 2014–2015	(-)	2 (0)	(-)	2 (0)	(-)	4 (0)	0
43	(England) Adam Cummins	2011–2015	(-)	1 (0)	(-)	3 (0)	(-)	4 (0)	0
43	(Scotland) Stephen McManus	2013–2017	(-)	(-)	(-)	4 (0)	(-)	4 (0)	0
43	(Uganda) Bevis Mugabi	2019–2024	(-)	(-)	(-)	2 (0)	2 (0)	4 (0)	0
43	(Scotland) Barry Maguire	2017–2024	(-)	(-)	(-)	2 (0)	2 (0)	4 (0)	0
43	(Australia) Oscar Priestman	2025–present	(-)	(-)	(-)	(-)	4 (0)	4 (0)	0
43	(Scotland) Mikey Booth	2026–present	(-)	(-)	(-)	(-)	4 (0)	4 (0)	0
43	(Scotland) Stephen O'Donnell	2020–present	(-)	(-)	(-)	3 (1)	1 (0)	4 (1)	0.25
43	(Wales) Tom Sparrow	2025–present	(-)	(-)	(-)	(-)	4 (0)	4 (0)	0
43	(Scotland) Alex Lowry	2026–present	(-)	(-)	(-)	(-)	4 (0)	4 (0)	0
43	(Canada) Jamie Knight-Lebel	2026–present	(-)	(-)	(-)	(-)	4 (0)	4 (0)	0
59	(Scotland) Phil O'Donnell	1990–1994; 2004–2007	2 (0)	(-)	1 (0)	(-)	(-)	3 (0)	0
59	(Scotland) Paul McGrillen	1990–1995	(-)	(-)	3 (1)	(-)	(-)	3 (1)	0.33
59	(Scotland) Alex Burns	1991–1997; 2003–2005	(-)	(-)	3 (2)	(-)	(-)	3 (2)	0.67
59	(Scotland) Dougie Arnott	1986–1998	0 (0)	(-)	3 (1)	(-)	(-)	3 (1)	0.33
59	(Scotland) Marc Fitzpatrick	2004–2011	(-)	(-)	1 (0)	2 (0)	(-)	3 (0)	0
59	(England) Nicky Law	2011–2013	(-)	2 (0)	(-)	1 (0)	(-)	3 (0)	0
59	(Scotland) Iain Vigurs	2013–2015	(-)	(-)	(-)	3 (0)	(-)	3 (0)	0
59	(Northern Ireland) Trevor Carson	2017–2021	(-)	(-)	(-)	3 (0)	(-)	3 (0)	0
59	(Scotland) Allan Campbell	2016–2021	(-)	(-)	(-)	3 (0)	(-)	3 (0)	0
59	(Scotland) Mark O'Hara	2019–2020; 2020–2022	(-)	(-)	(-)	3 (0)	(-)	3 (0)	0
59	(Scotland) Chris Long	2019–2021	(-)	(-)	(-)	3 (1)	(-)	3 (1)	0.33
59	(Scotland) Liam Polworth	2019–2021	(-)	(-)	(-)	3 (1)	(-)	3 (1)	0.33
59	(Scotland) Declan Gallagher	2019–2021	(-)	(-)	(-)	3 (0)	(-)	3 (0)	0
59	(Scotland) Tony Watt	2020–2022	(-)	(-)	(-)	3 (2)	(-)	3 (2)	0.67
59	(England) Callum Lang	2020–2021	(-)	(-)	(-)	3 (2)	(-)	3 (2)	0.67
59	(Scotland) Luca Ross	2022–present	(-)	(-)	(-)	(-)	3 (0)	3 (0)	0
59	(England) Dylan Williams	2026–present	(-)	(-)	(-)	(-)	3 (1)	3 (1)	0.33
76	(Scotland) Billy Thomson	1991–1994	2 (0)	(-)	(-)	(-)	(-)	2 (0)	0
76	(Scotland) Jim Griffin	1984–1994	2 (0)	(-)	(-)	(-)	(-)	2 (0)	0
76	(Netherlands) Luc Nijholt	1990–1993	2 (0)	(-)	(-)	(-)	(-)	2 (0)	0
76	(Scotland) Chris McCart	1985–1997	2 (0)	(-)	(-)	(-)	(-)	2 (0)	0
76	(Scotland) Bobby Russell	1987–1992	2 (0)	(-)	(-)	(-)	(-)	2 (0)	0
76	(Scotland) Davie Cooper	1989–1993	2 (0)	(-)	(-)	(-)	(-)	2 (0)	0
76	(England) Nick Cusack	1989–1992	2 (1)	(-)	(-)	(-)	(-)	2 (1)	0.5
76	(Scotland) Eddie May	1994–1999	(-)	(-)	2 (0)	(-)	(-)	2 (0)	0
76	(Scotland) Graeme Smith	2005–2009	(-)	(-)	2 (0)	(-)	(-)	2 (0)	0
76	(Scotland) Paul Quinn	2002–2009	(-)	(-)	2 (0)	(-)	(-)	2 (0)	0
76	(Scotland) Stephen Hughes	2007–2009; 2011–2012	(-)	(-)	2 (0)	(-)	(-)	2 (0)	0
76	(Scotland) Bob Malcolm	2008–2009	(-)	(-)	2 (0)	(-)	(-)	2 (0)	0
76	(England) Chris Porter	2007–2009	(-)	(-)	2 (0)	(-)	(-)	2 (0)	0
76	(Scotland) David Clarkson	2002–2009; 2015–2016	(-)	(-)	2 (0)	(-)	(-)	2 (0)	0
76	(Scotland) Darren Smith	2004–2010	(-)	(-)	2 (0)	(-)	(-)	2 (0)	0
76	(England) Giles Coke	2009–2010	(-)	(-)	(-)	2 (0)	(-)	2 (0)	0
76	(England) John Ruddy	2009–2010	(-)	(-)	(-)	2 (0)	(-)	2 (0)	0
76	(England) Nick Blackman	2010–2011	(-)	(-)	(-)	2 (0)	(-)	2 (0)	0
76	(Jamaica) Omar Daley	2011–2013	(-)	2 (0)	(-)	(-)	(-)	2 (0)	0
76	(Scotland) Paul Lawson	2013–2015	(-)	(-)	(-)	2 (0)	(-)	2 (0)	0
76	(Estonia) Henri Anier	2013–2014; 2014	(-)	(-)	(-)	2 (0)	(-)	2 (0)	0
76	(Scotland) Craig Reid	2014–2016	(-)	(-)	(-)	2 (0)	(-)	2 (0)	0
76	(England) Lionel Ainsworth	2013–2014; 2014–2017	(-)	(-)	(-)	2 (1)	(-)	2 (1)	0.5
76	(Czech Republic) Dan Twardzik	2013–2014; 2014–2016	(-)	(-)	(-)	2 (0)	(-)	2 (0)	0
76	(Republic of Ireland) Mark O'Brien	2014–2015	(-)	(-)	(-)	2 (0)	(-)	2 (0)	0
76	(England) Josh Law	2014–2016	(-)	(-)	(-)	2 (2)	(-)	2 (2)	1
76	(England) Liam Grimshaw	2017–2022	(-)	(-)	(-)	2 (0)	(-)	2 (0)	0
76	(England) Nathan McGinley	2020–2024	(-)	(-)	(-)	2 (0)	(-)	2 (0)	0
76	(Netherlands) Sherwin Seedorf	2019–2021	(-)	(-)	(-)	2 (0)	(-)	2 (0)	0
76	(Scotland) Liam Kelly	2021; 2021–2024	(-)	(-)	(-)	2 (0)	(-)	2 (0)	0
76	(Republic of Ireland) Jake Carroll	2019–2023	(-)	(-)	(-)	2 (0)	(-)	2 (0)	0
76	(Scotland) Blair Spittal	2022–2024	(-)	(-)	(-)	2 (0)	(-)	2 (0)	0
76	(England) Callum Slattery	2021–2026	(-)	(-)	(-)	2 (0)	(-)	2 (0)	0
76	(Netherlands) Kevin van Veen	2021–2023	(-)	(-)	(-)	2 (0)	(-)	2 (0)	0
76	(United States) Joseph Efford	2022–2023	(-)	(-)	(-)	2 (0)	(-)	2 (0)	0
76	(Scotland) Paul McGinn	2022–present	(-)	(-)	(-)	2 (0)	(-)	2 (0)	0
76	(England) Josh Morris	2022–2023	(-)	(-)	(-)	2 (0)	(-)	2 (0)	0
76	(Republic of Ireland) Ross Tierney	2022–2024	(-)	(-)	(-)	2 (0)	(-)	2 (0)	0
76	(Scotland) Connor Shields	2021–2023	(-)	(-)	(-)	2 (0)	(-)	2 (0)	0
76	(Australia) John Koutroumbis	2024–present	(-)	(-)	(-)	(-)	2 (0)	2 (0)	0
76	(Republic of Ireland) Joe Hodge	2026–present	(-)	(-)	(-)	(-)	2 (0)	2 (0)	0
76	(England) Seb Palmer-Houlden	2026–present	(-)	(-)	(-)	(-)	2 (0)	2 (0)	0
118	(Scotland) Joe McLeod	1990–1993	1 (0)	(-)	(-)	(-)	(-)	1 (0)	0
118	(Scotland) Tony Shepherd	1991–1993	1 (0)	(-)	(-)	(-)	(-)	1 (0)	0
118	(Scotland) Ian Angus	1990–1994	1 (0)	(-)	(-)	(-)	(-)	1 (0)	0
118	(Scotland) Iain Ferguson	1990–1993	1 (0)	(-)	(-)	(-)	(-)	1 (0)	0
118	(Scotland) Ray Allan	1994	(-)	(-)	1 (0)	(-)	(-)	1 (0)	0
118	(Scotland) Steve McMillan	1993–2001	(-)	(-)	1 (0)	(-)	(-)	1 (0)	0
118	(Scotland) Alex McLeish	1994–1995	(-)	(-)	1 (0)	(-)	(-)	1 (0)	0
118	(Scotland) Shaun McSkimming	1994–1998	(-)	(-)	1 (1)	(-)	(-)	1 (1)	1
118	(Scotland) Scott Howie	1994–1998	(-)	(-)	1 (0)	(-)	(-)	1 (0)	0
118	(Netherlands) Mitchell van der Gaag	1995–1997	(-)	(-)	1 (0)	(-)	(-)	1 (0)	0
118	(Scotland) John Hendry	1995–1998	(-)	(-)	1 (0)	(-)	(-)	1 (0)	0
118	(Northern Ireland) Roy Essandoh	1994–1997	(-)	(-)	1 (0)	(-)	(-)	1 (0)	0
118	(Scotland) Andy Roddie	1994–1997	(-)	(-)	1 (0)	(-)	(-)	1 (0)	0
118	(Scotland) Lee McCulloch	1994–2001	(-)	(-)	1 (0)	(-)	(-)	1 (0)	0
118	(Scotland) Mark Archdeacon	2008–2010	(-)	(-)	(-)	1 (0)	(-)	1 (0)	0
118	(Scotland) Jamie Pollock	2009–2012	(-)	(-)	(-)	1 (0)	(-)	1 (0)	0
118	(Scotland) Gary Smith	2009–2012	(-)	(-)	(-)	1 (0)	(-)	1 (0)	0
118	(England) Steven Hetherington	2011–2013	(-)	(-)	(-)	(-)	(-)	1 (0)	0
118	(Scotland) Lee Hollis	2010–2014	(-)	(-)	(-)	1 (0)	(-)	1 (0)	0
118	(Scotland) James McFadden	2000–2003; 2013–2014; 2015–2017	(-)	(-)	(-)	1 (0)	(-)	1 (0)	0
118	(Faroe Islands) Gunnar Nielsen	2008; 2013–2015	(-)	(-)	(-)	1 (0)	(-)	1 (0)	0
118	(Scotland) Craig Moore	2011–2017	(-)	(-)	(-)	1 (0)	(-)	1 (0)	0
118	(Scotland) Lee Erwin	2012–2015	(-)	(-)	(-)	1 (0)	(-)	1 (0)	0
118	(Scotland) Jack Leitch	2013–2016	(-)	(-)	(-)	1 (0)	(-)	1 (0)	0
118	(Scotland) Jake Hastie	2016–2019; 2020–2021	(-)	(-)	(-)	1 (0)	(-)	1 (0)	0
118	(Northern Ireland) Harry Robinson	2020–2021	(-)	(-)	(-)	1 (0)	(-)	1 (0)	0
118	(Scotland) Jordan White	2020–2021	(-)	(-)	(-)	1 (0)	(-)	1 (0)	0
118	(Germany) Sean Goss	2021–2023	(-)	(-)	(-)	1 (0)	(-)	1 (0)	0
118	(Norway) Sondre Solholm Johansen	2021–2023	(-)	(-)	(-)	1 (0)	(-)	1 (0)	0
118	(Scotland) Lucas Weir	2026–present	(-)	(-)	(-)	(-)	1 (0)	1 (0)	0

=== Goalscorers ===
As of match played 27 August 2026

Rank	Player	Years	Cup Winners' Cup	Champions League	UEFA Cup	Europa League	Conference League	Total	Ratio
1	(Scotland) Jamie Murphy	2006–2013	(-)	0 (2)	0 (2)	7 (14)	(-)	7 (18)	0.39
2	(Scotland) Steve Kirk	1986–1995	2 (2)	(-)	3 (4)	(-)	(-)	5 (6)	0.83
3	(Scotland) Ross Forbes	2007–2012	(-)	(-)	(-)	4 (10)	(-)	4 (10)	0.4
4	(England) John Sutton	2008–2011; 2013–2015	(-)	(-)	0 (2)	3 (15)	(-)	3 (17)	0.18
5	(Scotland) Alex Burns	1991–1997; 2003–2005	(-)	(-)	2 (3)	(-)	(-)	2 (3)	0.67
5	(England) Josh Law	2014–2016	(-)	(-)	(-)	2 (2)	(-)	2 (2)	1
5	(Scotland) Tony Watt	2020–2022	(-)	(-)	(-)	2 (3)	(-)	2 (3)	0.67
5	(England) Callum Lang	2020–2021	(-)	(-)	(-)	2 (3)	(-)	2 (3)	0.67
5	(Austria) Lukas Fadinger	2025–present	(-)	(-)	(-)	(-)	2 (6)	2 (6)	0.33
5	(Nigeria) Ibrahim Said	2025–present	(-)	(-)	(-)	(-)	2 (5)	2 (5)	0.4
5	(Grenada) Regan Charles-Cook	2025–present	(-)	(-)	(-)	(-)	2 (6)	2 (6)	0.33
12	(England) Nick Cusack	1989–1992	1 (2)	(-)	(-)	(-)	(-)	1 (2)	0.5
12	(Republic of Ireland) Tommy Coyne	1993–1998	(-)	(-)	1 (4)	(-)	(-)	1 (4)	0.25
12	(Scotland) Paul McGrillen	1990–1995	(-)	(-)	1 (3)	(-)	(-)	1 (3)	0.33
12	(Scotland) Billy Davies	1993–1998	(-)	(-)	1 (6)	(-)	(-)	1 (6)	0.17
12	(Scotland) Shaun McSkimming	1994–1998	(-)	(-)	1 (1)	(-)	(-)	1 (1)	1
12	(Scotland) Dougie Arnott	1986–1998	0 (0)	(-)	1 (3)	(-)	(-)	1 (3)	0.33
12	(Scotland) Paul Slane	2009–2010	(-)	(-)	(-)	1 (6)	(-)	1 (6)	0.17
12	(England) Shaun Hutchinson	2009–2014	(-)	0 (2)	(-)	1 (6)	(-)	1 (8)	0.13
12	(Scotland) Bob McHugh	2007–2015	(-)	0 (1)	(-)	1 (9)	(-)	1 (10)	0.1
12	(England) Tom Hateley	2009–2013	(-)	0 (2)	(-)	1 (7)	(-)	1 (9)	0.11
12	(England) Jonathan Page	2008–2012	(-)	(-)	(-)	1 (5)	(-)	1 (5)	0.2
12	(Scotland) Steven Hammell	1999–2006; 2008–2018	(-)	0 (2)	0 (2)	1 (17)	(-)	1 (21)	0.05
12	(England) Lionel Ainsworth	2013–2014; 2014–2017	(-)	(-)	(-)	1 (2)	(-)	1 (2)	0.5
12	(England) Chris Long	2019–2021	(-)	(-)	(-)	1 (3)	(-)	1 (3)	0.33
12	(Scotland) Liam Polworth	2019–2021	(-)	(-)	(-)	1 (3)	(-)	1 (3)	0.33
12	(Scotland) Stephen O'Donnell	2020–present	(-)	(-)	(-)	1 (3)	0 (1)	1 (4)	0.25
12	(Austria) Martin Moormann	2026–present	(-)	(-)	(-)	(-)	1 (5)	1 (5)	0.2
12	(England) Dylan Williams	2026–present	(-)	(-)	(-)	(-)	1 (3)	1 (3)	0.33
12	(Zimbabwe) Tawanda Maswanhise	2024–present	(-)	(-)	(-)	(-)	1 (5)	1 (5)	0.2
25	(England) Emmanuel Longelo	2025–present	(-)	(-)	(-)	(-)	1 (5)	1 (6)	0.17

=== Clean sheets ===
As of match played 27 August 2026

Rank	Player	Years	Cup Winners' Cup	Champions League	UEFA Cup	Europa League	Conference League	Total	Ratio
1	(Republic of Ireland) Darren Randolph	2010–2013	(-)	0 (2)	(-)	3 (8)	(-)	3 (10)	0.3
1	(New Zealand) Alex Paulsen	2026–present	(-)	(-)	(-)	(-)	3 (6)	3 (6)	0.5
3	(Scotland) Stevie Woods	1994–2003	(-)	(-)	1 (5)	(-)	(-)	1 (5)	0.2
3	(Scotland) Scott Howie	1994–1998	(-)	(-)	1 (1)	(-)	(-)	1 (1)	1
3	(Scotland) Michael Fraser	2009–2010	(-)	(-)	(-)	1 (4)	(-)	1 (4)	0.25
6	(Scotland) Billy Thomson	1991–1994	0 (2)	(-)	(-)	(-)	(-)	0 (2)	0
6	(Scotland) Ray Allan	1994	(-)	(-)	0 (1)	(-)	(-)	0 (1)	0
6	(Scotland) Graeme Smith	2005–2009	(-)	(-)	0 (2)	(-)	(-)	0 (2)	0
6	(England) John Ruddy	2009–2010	(-)	(-)	(-)	0 (2)	(-)	0 (2)	0
6	(Scotland) Lee Hollis	2010–2014	(-)	(-)	(-)	0 (1)	(-)	0 (1)	0
6	(Faroe Islands) Gunnar Nielsen	2008; 2013–2015	(-)	(-)	(-)	0 (1)	(-)	0 (1)	0
6	(Czech Republic) Dan Twardzik	2013–2014; 2014–2016	(-)	(-)	(-)	0 (2)	(-)	0 (2)	0
6	(Northern Ireland) Trevor Carson	2017–2021	(-)	(-)	(-)	0 (3)	(-)	0 (3)	0
6	(Scotland) Liam Kelly	2021; 2021–2024	(-)	(-)	(-)	(-)	0 (2)	0 (2)	0
