= 2026–27 Motherwell F.C. season =

Motherwell
2026–27 season
- Chairman: Kyrk Macmillan
- Manager: Alfred Johansson
- Stadium: Fir Park
- Premiership: 9th
- Scottish Cup: Preseason
- League Cup: Second round vs Stenhousemuir
- UEFA Conference League: Play-off round vs SC Freiburg
- Top goalscorer: League: Alex Lowry (3); All: Lukas Fadinger (4); Ibrahim Said (4)
- Highest home attendance: 10,682 vs Celtic (11 October 2026)
- Lowest home attendance: 6,412 vs Dundee United (2 September 2026)
- Average home league attendance: 7,956 (31 October 2026)
Home colours	Away colours

The 2026–27 season is Motherwell's forty-second consecutive season in the top flight of Scottish football, having been promoted from the Scottish First Division at the end of the 1984–85 season.

== Season review ==
=== Pre-season ===
On 8 May, Andy Halliday announced that his retirement from football at the end of the season when his contract with Motherwell expires.

On 17 May, Motherwell announced that Sam Nicholson would be joining Livingston once his contract expired at the end of the season.

On 19 May, Motherwell announced that Callum Slattery would be leaving the club after five season, when his contract expired at the end of the season, and that Lukas Fadinger had signed a one-year contract extension that will see him remain at the club until 2028.

On 20 May, Motherwell released their retained and released list, confirming the departures Kofi Balmer, Dylan Wells, Zach Robinson, Colbi McQuarrie, Scott Williamson, Jay Gillies, Arran Clark, Andrew Arnott, Campbell Forrest, Rocco McColm, Harry McLean, Nathan Lawson, Evan Samuel and Olivier Wieczorek alongside the already announced Callum Slattery, Sam Nicholson and retiring Andy Halliday. Motherwell also announced that they were in discussions with Liam Gordon and Zander McAllister over contract extensions whilst Olly Whyte, Jack McConnell, Jon Joe Friel and Mikey Booth had all agreed new contracts.

On 21 May, Motherwell announced that Jens Berthel Askou had left the club to take up the position of Head Coach at Toulouse.

On 10 June, Motherwell announced that they would be undertaking a seven-day training camp in Denmark, where they will also face AGF in a friendly on 5 July.

On 17 June, Motherwell were drawn against HB from the Faroe Islands in the Second qualifying round of the UEFA Conference League.

On 18 June, Motherwell announced that Alfred Johansson had been appointed as their new Manager. Also on 18 June, the Scottish Premiership fixtures were released, with Motherwell starting their campaign away to Hibernian on 2 August.

On 19 June, Motherwell confirmed that Zander McAllister had signed a new contract with the club, until the summer of 2028, and that Liam Gordon had not signed a new contract and had left the club.

=== July ===
On 3 July, Motherwell announced the signing of Martin Moormann from Blau-Weiß Linz, on a contract until the summer of 2028, and the signing of Willy Vogt from AC Bellinzona on a contract until the summer of 2028 with the option of an additional year.

On 6 July, Motherwell announced that eight academy players, Lewis McGahey, Samuel Ngandu, Matthew Pettigrew, Scott MacCrimmon, Kai McFarlane, Joshua Clarkson, Leo Lee and Jude Henderson had all signed their first professional contracts with the club.

On 9 July, Motherwell confirmed that Calum Ward had left the club to sign for Queens Park Rangers.

On 13 July, Motherwell announced the season-long loan signing of Alex Paulsen from AFC Bournemouth.

On 15 July, Motherwell announced the signing of Jake Girdwood-Reich from St. Louis City, to a three-year contract for an undisclosed fee.

On 17 July, Aston Oxborough left Motherwell to join Dunfermline Athletic on a permanent basis for an undisclosed fee.

On 18 July, Elliot Watt left Motherwell to join Süper Lig club Samsunspor for an undisclosed fee.

On 20 July, Motherwell announced the signing of Dylan Williams from Burton Albion, on a contract until the summer of 2028, with the option of an additional year, for an undisclosed fee.

On 22 July, Elijah Just left Motherwell to sign for EFL Championship club Swansea City in a club record transfer.

On 25 July, Motherwell announced the season-long loan signing of Alex Lowry from Wycombe Wanderers.

On 31 July, Motherwell announced the season-long loan signing of Jamie Knight-Lebel from Bristol City.

=== August ===
On 11 August, Motherwell announced the signing of Joe Hodge from Tondela for an undisclosed fee, to a two-year contract with the club holding the option of an additional year.

On 14 August, Motherwell's home fixture against Aberdeen, scheduled for 22 August was postponed and their away fixture against St Mirren scheduled for 29 August was pushed back to 30 August, both due to Motherwell's participation in the Play-off round of the UEFA Conference League.

On 19 August, Motherwell announced the signing of Seb Palmer-Houlden from Gillingham for an undisclosed fee, to a two-year contract with the club holding the option of an additional year.

On 28 August, Motherwell announced the signing of Jardell Kanga from Ilves for an undisclosed fee, to a three-year contract with the club holding the option of an additional year.

=== September ===
On 1 September, Motherwell announced the signing of Dylan Levitt from Leyton Orient for an undisclosed fee, to a two-year contract with the club holding the option of an additional year.

On 3 September, Olly Whyte joined Ayr United on loan for the remainder of the season.

On 8 September, Motherwell announced that Apostolos Stamatelopoulos had left the club by mutual agreement to pursue opportunities elsewhere.

On 10 September, Lucas Weir joined Cowdenbeath on a co-operation agreement for the season.

On 11 September, Luca Ross joined Alloa Athletic on loan for the reminder for the season.

On 18 September, Motherwell announced that they had entered into a Cooperation Agreement with The Spartans, with Zander McAllister and Aaron Thomson joining the club for the season.

=== November ===
On 14 November, Jack McConnell joined The Spartans on a seven-day emergency loan deal.

== Squad ==
As of match played 7 November 2026

No.	Name	Nationality	Position	Date of birth (age)	Signed from	Signed in	Contract ends	Apps.	Goals
Goalkeepers
1	Alex Paulsen	(New Zealand)	GK	4 July 2002 (age 24)	on loan from AFC Bournemouth	2026	2027	19	0
21	Matthew Connelly	(Scotland)	GK	2 March 2003 (age 23)	Academy	2019	2027 (+1)	6	0
Defenders
2	Stephen O'Donnell	(Scotland)	DF	11 May 1992 (age 34)	Kilmarnock	2020	2027	233	6
3	Jake Girdwood-Reich	(Australia)	DF	26 May 2004 (age 22)	St. Louis City	2026	2029	19	0
4	Jamie Knight-Lebel	(Canada)	DF	24 December 2004 (age 21)	on loan from Bristol City	2026	2027	11	0
5	Martin Moormann	(Austria)	DF	30 April 2001 (age 25)	Blau-Weiß Linz	2026	2028	19	1
6	Jordan McGhee	(Scotland)	DF	24 July 1996 (age 30)	Unattached	2025	2027(+1)	10	0
16	Paul McGinn	(Scotland)	DF	22 October 1990 (age 36)	Hibernian	2022	2027	131	2
20	Dylan Williams	(England)	DF	13 September 2003 (age 23)	Burton Albion	2026	2028 (+1)	7	1
22	John Koutroumbis	(Australia)	DF	6 March 1998 (age 28)	Unattached	2024	2028	44	1
23	Ewan Wilson	(Scotland)	DF	19 November 2004 (age 21)	Academy	2021	2027 (+1)	53	1
45	Emmanuel Longelo	(England)	DF	27 December 2000 (age 25)	Birmingham City	2025	2027	64	10
Midfielders
7	Tom Sparrow	(Wales)	MF	6 December 2002 (age 23)	Unattached	2024	2027 (+1)	90	6
8	Lukas Fadinger	(Austria)	MF	27 September 2000 (age 26)	Rheindorf Altach	2025	2028	62	10
11	Alex Lowry	(Scotland)	MF	23 June 2003 (age 23)	on loan from Wycombe Wanderers	2026	2027	14	3
12	Oscar Priestman	(Australia)	MF	25 March 2003 (age 23)	Western Sydney Wanderers	2025	2028	39	0
27	Mikey Booth	(Scotland)	MF	2 January 2007 (age 19)	Academy	2023		6	0
63	Dylan Levitt	(Wales)	MF	17 November 2000 (age 25)	Leyton Orient	2026	2028(+1)	7	1
71	Joe Hodge (Note: Joe Hodge was born in Manchester, England, but qualified to represent the Republic of Ireland, representing them at youth level before making his senior debut in June 2026.)	(Republic of Ireland)	MF	14 September 2002 (age 24)	Tondela	2026	2028 (+1)	14	0
Forwards
13	Jardell Kanga	(Sweden)	FW	13 December 2005 (age 20)	Ilves	2026	2029 (+1)	11	1
14	Callum Hendry (Note: Callum Hendry was born in Lytham St Annes, England.)	(Scotland)	FW	8 December 1997 (age 28)	Milton Keynes Dons	2025	2027 (+1)	24	1
15	Eythor Bjørgolfsson	(Norway)	FW	25 August 2000 (age 26)	Umeå	2026	2028	20	1
17	Regan Charles-Cook (Note: Regan Charles-Cook was born in Lewisham, England, but qualified to represent Grenada, making his debut in 2021.)	(Grenada)	FW	14 February 1997 (age 29)	Eupen	2025	2027	43	4
18	Tawanda Maswanhise	(Zimbabwe)	FW	20 November 2002 (age 23)	Unattached	2024	2027(+1)	97	31
19	Ibrahim Said	(Nigeria)	FW	15 June 2002 (age 24)	Viborg	2025	2027 (+1)	63	7
47	Seb Palmer-Houlden	(England)	FW	14 November 2003 (age 23)	Gillingham	2026	2028 (+1)	13	2
77	Willy Vogt (Note: Willy Vogt was born in Guarapuava, Brazil, but qualified to represent Switzerland, making his debut for Switzerland U18 in 2019.)	(Switzerland)	FW	1 June 2002 (age 24)	AC Bellinzona	2026	2028 (+1)	13	0
Development team
26	Jon-Joe Friel	(Scotland)	DF	2 February 2008 (age 18)	Academy	2024		0	0
28	Aaron Buchanan	(Scotland)	MF	2 June 2009 (age 17)	Academy	2025		0	0
30	Jack Dalziel	(Scotland)	DF	8 March 2009 (age 17)	Academy	2025		0	0
32	Robbie Hunter	(Scotland)	FW	29 October 2009 (age 17)	Academy	2025		0	0
33	Aiden Tearney	(Scotland)	DF	2 May 2009 (age 17)	Academy	2025		0	0
35	Blane Watson	(Scotland)	MF	5 August 2009 (age 17)	Academy	2025		0	0
43	Samuel Ngandu	(England)	DF	9 April 2010 (age 16)	Academy	2026		0	0
	Lewis McGahey	(Scotland)	GK		Academy	2026		0	0
	Samuel Ngandu	(Scotland)	DF		Academy	2026		0	0
	Matthew Pettigrew	(Scotland)	DF		Academy	2026		0	0
	Scott MacCrimmon	(Scotland)	DF		Academy	2026		0	0
	Kai McFarlane	(Scotland)	DF		Academy	2026		0	0
	Joshua Clarkson	(Scotland)	FW		Academy	2026		0	0
	Leo Lee	(Scotland)	FW		Academy	2026		0	0
	Jude Henderson	(Scotland)	FW		Academy	2026		0	0
Co-operation loans
29	Zander McAllister	(Scotland)	MF	22 April 2008 (age 18)	Academy	2024	2028	5	0
34	Aaron Thomson	(Scotland)	DF	26 March 2009 (age 17)	Academy	2025		0	0
36	Lucas Weir	(Scotland)	FW	30 June 2009 (age 17)	Academy	2025		1	0
Away on loan
24	Luca Ross	(Scotland)	FW	11 August 2006 (age 20)	Academy	2022	2027	22	1
25	Olly Whyte	(Scotland)	MF	27 November 2006 (age 19)	Academy	2023		8	0
31	Jack McConnell	(Scotland)	GK	20 June 2008 (age 18)	Academy	2024		0	0
Left during the season
1	Aston Oxborough	(England)	GK	9 May 1998 (age 28)	Unattached	2022	2027(+1)	32	0
9	Apostolos Stamatelopoulos	(Australia)	FW	9 April 1999 (age 27)	Newcastle Jets	2024	2027	45	12
11	Elijah Just	(New Zealand)	MF	1 May 2000 (age 26)	AC Horsens	2025	2027(+1)	43	7
13	Calum Ward	(England)	GK	17 October 2000 (age 26)	Unattached	2025	2027 (+1)	42	0
20	Elliot Watt	(Scotland)	MF	11 March 2000 (age 26)	Burton Albion	2025	2027(+1)	42	6

== Transfers ==
For those players sold, released or contract ended before the start of this season, see 2025–26 Motherwell F.C. season.

=== In ===
Date	Position	Nationality	Name	From	Fee	Ref
3 July 2026	DF	(Austria)	Martin Moormann	Blau-Weiß Linz	Undisclosed	
3 July 2026	FW	(Switzerland)	Willy Vogt	AC Bellinzona	Undisclosed	
15 July 2026	DF	(Australia)	Jake Girdwood-Reich	St. Louis City	Undisclosed	
20 July 2026	DF	(England)	Dylan Williams	Burton Albion	Undisclosed	
11 August 2026	MF	(Republic of Ireland)	Joe Hodge	Tondela	Undisclosed	
19 August 2026	FW	(England)	Seb Palmer-Houlden	Gillingham	Undisclosed	
28 August 2026	FW	(Sweden)	Jardell Kanga	Ilves	Undisclosed	
1 September 2026	MF	(Wales)	Dylan Levitt	Leyton Orient	Undisclosed	

=== Loans in ===
Date from	Position	Nationality	Name	From	Date to	Ref.
13 July 2026	GK	(New Zealand)	Alex Paulsen	AFC Bournemouth	End of season	
25 July 2026	MF	(Scotland)	Alex Lowry	Wycombe Wanderers	End of season	
31 July 2026	DF	(Canada)	Jamie Knight-Lebel	Bristol City	End of season	

=== Out ===
Date	Position	Nationality	Name	To	Fee	Ref.
9 July 2026	GK	(England)	Calum Ward	Queens Park Rangers	Undisclosed	
17 July 2026	GK	(England)	Aston Oxborough	Dunfermline Athletic	Undisclosed	
18 July 2026	MF	(Scotland)	Elliot Watt	Samsunspor	Undisclosed	
22 July 2026	MF	(New Zealand)	Elijah Just	Swansea City	Undisclosed	

=== Loans out ===
Date from	Position	Nationality	Name	To	Date to	Ref.
3 September 2026	MF	(Scotland)	Olly Whyte	Ayr United	End of Season	
10 September 2026	FW	(Scotland)	Lucas Weir	Cowdenbeath	End of Season	
11 September 2026	FW	(Scotland)	Luca Ross	Alloa Athletic	End of Season	
18 September 2026	DF	(Scotland)	Aaron Thomson	The Spartans	End of Season	
18 September 2026	MF	(Scotland)	Zander McAllister	The Spartans	End of Season	
14 November 2026	GK	(Scotland)	Jack McConnell	The Spartans	21 November 2026	

=== Released ===
Date	Position	Nationality	Name	Joined	Date	Ref.
8 September 2026	FW	(Australia)	Apostolos Stamatelopoulos	Macarthur FC	14 September 2026	

== Friendlies ==
5 July 2026	AGF	4–0	Motherwell	Aarhus
13:00 BST (UTC+1)	4'; 57'; 69'; 87'	Report		Stadium: AGF Training Ground

11 July 2026	Motherwell	2–3	Carlisle United	Motherwell
BST (UTC+1)	Wilson; Said	Report	Linney 6'; Ajiboye 58'; Mason 59'	Stadium: Fir Park

17 July 2026	Motherwell	3–4	KRC Genk	Motherwell
19:00 BST (UTC+1)	Just 28' (pen.); Booth 75'; Hunter 84'	Report	Bibout 32', 49'; Heymans 44'; Manguelle 78'	Stadium: Fir Park

== Competitions ==
=== Overview ===
Competition	First match	Last match	Starting round	Final position	Record							
Competition	First match	Last match	Starting round	Final position	Pld	W	D	L	GF	GA	GD	Win %
Premiership	2 August 2026	2027	Matchday 1		13	3	4	6	15	21	−6	23.08
Scottish Cup	2027	2027	Fourth round		0	0	0	0	0	0	+0	—
League Cup	16 August 2026	16 August 2026	Second Round	Second Round	1	0	0	1	0	1	−1	0.00
UEFA Conference League	23 July 2026	27 August 2026	Second qualifying round	Play-off round	6	3	1	2	10	8	+2	50.00
Total					20	6	5	9	25	30	−5	30.00

Last updated: 7 November 2026
Source: Soccerway

=== Premiership ===
==== League table ====
Pos	Team	Pld	W	D	L	GF	GA	GD	Pts	Qualification or relegation (Note: Teams play each other three times (33 matches), before the league is split into two groups (the top six and the bottom six).)
7	St Johnstone	13	4	5	4	17	20	−3	17	
8	St Mirren	13	4	2	7	12	22	−10	14	
9	Motherwell	13	3	4	6	15	21	−6	13	
10	Hibernian	12	3	2	7	15	17	−2	11	
11	Aberdeen	12	3	2	7	12	18	−6	11	Qualification for the Premiership play-off final

Updated to match(es) played on 8 November 2026. Source:
Rules for classification: 1) Points; 2) Goal difference; 3) Goals scored; 4) Head-to-head points; 5) Head-to-head goal difference; 6) Play-off (only if deciding champion, UEFA competition qualification, second stage group allocation, or relegation).

==== Results summary ====
Overall								Home						Away					
Pld	W	D	L	GF	GA	GD	Pts	W	D	L	GF	GA	GD	W	D	L	GF	GA	GD
13	3	4	6	14	21	−7	13	2	1	3	3	8	−5	1	3	3	11	13	−2

Last updated: 7 November 2026.
Source: SPFL

==== Results ====
2 August 2026 1	Hibernian	1–2	Motherwell	Edinburgh
16:30 BST (UTC+1)	Mulligan (yellow card) 48'; Boyle 56' (pen.)	Report	Fadinger 40' (pen.), (yellow card) 68'; Priestman (yellow card) 55'; Sparrow (yellow card) 76'; Said 85'	Stadium: Easter Road; Attendance: 17,440; Referee: Steven McLean

9 August 2026 2	Motherwell	0–0	Falkirk	Motherwell
15:00 BST (UTC+1)	Moormann (yellow card) 51'; Fadinger (yellow card) 75'	Report	Yeats (yellow card) 44'; Krauhaus (yellow card) 65'	Stadium: Fir Park; Attendance: 7,028; Referee: Chris Graham

30 August 2026 4	St Mirren	3–3	Motherwell	Paisley
15:00 BST (UTC+1)	Nsio 39'; John 44'; Ramos 45+4'; Carr (yellow card) 85'; Young (yellow card) 89'	Report	Maswanhise 2', (penalty missed) 14'; Charles-Cook 24'; O'Donnell (yellow card) 47'; Moormann (yellow card) 52'; Kanga 90+3'	Stadium: St Mirren Park; Attendance: 5,295; Referee: Kevin Clancy
Note: Match originally scheduled for 29 August, but pushed back 24hrs due to Motherwell's participation in the UEFA Conference League.

2 September 2026 5	Motherwell	3–0	Dundee United	Motherwell
19:45 BST (UTC+1)	Palmer-Houlden 19', (yellow card) 35'; Lowry 65'; Levitt 67'	Report	Agyei (red card) 14'	Stadium: Fir Park; Attendance: 6,412; Referee: Calum Scott

5 September 2026 6	Rangers	1–0	Motherwell	Glasgow
15:00 BST (UTC+1)	Naderi 12'; Kim (penalty missed) 29'	Report		Stadium: Ibrox Stadium; Attendance: 50,868; Referee: Duncan Nicolson

15 September 2026 3	Motherwell	0–4	Aberdeen	Motherwell
19:45 BST (UTC+1)	Sparrow (yellow card) 40'; Longelo (yellow card) 53'	Report	Mayo (yellow card) 12'; Molloy 38'; Ronan 46'; Aremu (yellow card) 63'; Mouloua 76' (yellow card) 76'; Nisbet 87'	Stadium: Fir Park; Attendance: 6,965; Referee: Steven McLean
Note: Match originally scheduled for 22 August, but postponed on 14 August due to Motherwell's participation in the UEFA Conference League.

19 September 2026 7	Dundee	2–1	Motherwell	Dundee
15:00 BST (UTC+1)	Westley 23' (pen.); Fink 40'; Goodman (yellow card) 90+3'	Report	Lowry 44'; Williams (yellow card) 67'	Stadium: Dens Park; Attendance: 5,318; Referee: Ross Hardie

11 October 2026 8	Motherwell	0–2	Celtic	Motherwell
12:00 BST (UTC+1)	Hodge (yellow card) 41'	Report	Durán 9'; Nygren 58'; Tierney (yellow card) 82'; Lotomba (yellow card) 85'	Stadium: Fir Park; Attendance: 10,682; Referee: Steven McLean

17 October 2026 9	Kilmarnock	3–2	Motherwell	Kilmarnock
15:00 BST (UTC+1)	Kiltie 2', 69'; Stanger (yellow card) 55'; John-Jules 58'	Report	Lowry 17'; Palmer-Houlden 56'	Stadium: Rugby Park; Attendance: 5,137; Referee: Calum Scott

25 October 2026 10	Motherwell	0–2	Heart of Midlothian	Motherwell
14:00 GMT (UTC)	Sparrow (yellow card) 41'; Said (yellow card) 79'; Maswanhise (yellow card) 81'	Report	Fagan-Walcott (yellow card) 24'; Braga 29'; Kerjota (yellow card) 57'; McCart (yellow card) 59'; Mato (yellow card) 77'; Miller 86'; Dhanda (yellow card) 90+3'	Stadium: Fir Park; Attendance: 9,911; Referee: Duncan Nicolson

28 October 2026 11	St Johnstone	2–2	Motherwell	Perth
19:45 GMT (UTC)	Steven 19'; Alić (yellow card) 51'; Campbell 90+3'	Report	Said 34' (yellow card) 51'; Maswanhise 54'; Sparrow (yellow card) 71'	Stadium: McDiarmid Park; Attendance: 4,027; Referee: John Beaton

31 October 2026 12	Motherwell	1–0	St Mirren	Motherwell
15:00 GMT (UTC)	Hodge (yellow card) 38'; Moormann (yellow card) 60'; Fadinger 82'; Charles-Cook (yellow card) 89'; Longelo (yellow card) 90'	Report	Fraser (yellow card) 590'; Carr (yellow card) 51'; Gogić (yellow card) 86'; Ramos (yellow card) 90+1'; Phillips (yellow card) 90+2'	Stadium: Fir Park; Attendance: 6,738; Referee: Don Robertson

7 November 2026 13	Dundee United	1–1	Motherwell	Dundee
15:00 GMT (UTC)	Tait (yellow card) 9'; Sapsford (yellow card) 11'; Randall 41'	Report	Fadinger 9' (pen.); Moormann (yellow card) 56'; Hendry (yellow card) 83'	Stadium: Tannadice Park; Attendance: 8,579; Referee: Ryan Lee

21 November 2026 14	Motherwell	v	Rangers	Motherwell
20:00 GMT (UTC)				Stadium: Fir Park

=== Scottish Cup ===
2027	v
GMT (UTC)

=== League Cup ===
==== Knockout phase ====
16 August 2026 Second round	Stenhousemuir	1–0 (a.e.t.)	Motherwell	Stenhousemuir
14:00 BST (UTC+1)	Bilham (yellow card) 45'; Meechan (yellow card) 104'; O'Reilly 114' (yellow card) 119'; Aitken (yellow card) 118'	Report	Said (yellow card) 24'; Fadinger (yellow card) 90+3'; Vogt (yellow card) 107'	Stadium: Ochilview Park; Attendance: 1,943; Referee: Colin Steven

=== UEFA Conference League ===
==== Qualifying rounds ====
23 July 2026 Second qualifying round 1st leg	Motherwell (Scotland)	2–0	(Faroe Islands) HB	Motherwell, Scotland
19:45 BST (UTC+1)	Moormann 15'; Fadinger 57'	Report		Stadium: Fir Park; Attendance: 7,767; Referee: Patryk Gryckiewicz (Poland)

30 July 2026 Second qualifying round 2nd leg	HB (Faroe Islands)	0–3 (0–5 agg.)	(Scotland) Motherwell	Tórshavn, Faroe Islands
18:00 BST (UTC+1)		Report	Fadinger 25' (pen.); Charles-Cook 36'; Williams 50'	Stadium: Gundadalur; Attendance: 1,050; Referee: Joonas Jaanovits (Estonia)

6 August 2026 Third qualifying round 1st leg	HJK (Finland)	1–1	(Scotland) Motherwell	Helsinki, Finland
17:00 BST (UTC+1)	Ylitolva (yellow card) 56'; Möller (yellow card) 58'; Pukki 71'	Report	Lowry (yellow card) 24'; Priestman (yellow card) 52'; Maswanhise 64' (pen.); Girdwood-Reich (yellow card) 81'	Stadium: Töölö Football Stadium; Attendance: 7,023; Referee: Dalibor Černý (Czech Republic)

13 August 2026 Third qualifying round 2nd leg	Motherwell (Scotland)	2–0 (3–1 agg.)	(Finland) HJK	Motherwell, Scotland
19:30 BST (UTC+1)	Said 47', 60'	Report	Cicale (yellow card) 43'; Ring (yellow card) 57'	Stadium: Fir Park; Attendance: 8,185; Referee: Michal Očenáš (Slovakia)

20 August 2026 Play-off round 1st leg	Motherwell (Scotland)	1–3	(Germany) SC Freiburg	Motherwell, Scotland
19:30 BST (UTC+1)	Charles-Cook 2'; Hodge (yellow card) 21'; Fadinger (yellow card) 39'; Moormann (red card) 65'; Lowry (yellow card) 67'	Report	Ginter 28', 65' (pen.); Beste (yellow card) 59'; Gotō 90+6'	Stadium: Fir Park; Attendance: 8,945; Referee: Radu Petrescu (Romania)

27 August 2026 Play-off round 2nd leg	SC Freiburg (Germany)	4–1 (2–7 agg.)	(Scotland) Motherwell	Freiburg im Breisgau, Germany
17:45 BST (UTC+1)	Scherhant 6'; Matanović 60'; Irié 63'; Goto 85'	Report	Longelo 22'; Knight-Lebel (yellow card) 55'; Girdwood-Reich (red card) 57'	Stadium: Europa-Park Stadion; Referee: Andrea Colombo (Italy)

== Squad statistics ==
=== Appearances ===
As of match played 7 November 2026

No.	Pos	Nat	Player	Total		Premiership		Scottish Cup		League Cup		UEFA Conference League	
No.	Pos	Nat	Player	Apps	Goals	Apps	Goals	Apps	Goals	Apps	Goals	Apps	Goals
1	GK	(New Zealand) NZL	Alex Paulsen	19	0	13	0	0	0	0	0	6	0
2	DF	(Scotland) SCO	Stephen O'Donnell	7	0	2+4	0	0	0	0	0	0+1	0
3	DF	(Australia) AUS	Jake Girdwood-Reich	19	0	8+4	0	0	0	1	0	6	0
4	DF	(Canada) CAN	Jamie Knight-Lebel	11	0	3+3	0	0	0	1	0	2+2	0
5	DF	(Austria) AUT	Martin Moormann	19	1	13	0	0	0	0+1	0	5	1
6	DF	(Scotland) SCO	Jordan McGhee	2	0	2	0	0	0	0	0	0	0
7	MF	(Wales) WAL	Tom Sparrow	17	0	13	0	0	0	0	0	3+1	0
8	MF	(Austria) AUT	Lukas Fadinger	19	5	11+1	3	0	0	0+1	0	6	2
11	MF	(Scotland) SCO	Alex Lowry	14	3	7+2	3	0	0	0+1	0	4	0
12	MF	(Australia) AUS	Oscar Priestman	8	0	2+2	0	0	0	0	0	4	0
13	FW	(Sweden) SWE	Jardell Kanga	11	1	4+7	1	0	0	0	0	0	0
14	FW	(Scotland) SCO	Callum Hendry	2	0	0+2	0	0	0	0	0	0	0
15	FW	(Norway) NOR	Eythor Bjørgolfsson	10	0	0+10	0	0	0	0	0	0	0
16	DF	(Scotland) SCO	Paul McGinn	1	0	0+1	0	0	0	0	0	0	0
17	FW	(Grenada) GRN	Regan Charles-Cook	16	3	4+5	1	0	0	0+1	0	4+2	2
18	FW	(Zimbabwe) ZIM	Tawanda Maswanhise	20	3	11+2	2	0	0	1	0	5+1	1
19	FW	(Nigeria) NGR	Ibrahim Said	18	4	10+2	2	0	0	1	0	5	2
20	DF	(England) ENG	Dylan Williams	7	1	1+3	0	0	0	0	0	2+1	1
21	GK	(Scotland) SCO	Matthew Connelly	1	0	0	0	0	0	1	0	0	0
22	DF	(Australia) AUS	John Koutroumbis	4	0	0+2	0	0	0	0	0	1+1	0
23	DF	(Scotland) SCO	Ewan Wilson	8	0	0+2	0	0	0	1	0	2+3	0
27	MF	(Scotland) SCO	Mikey Booth	6	0	1	0	0	0	1	0	2+2	0
29	MF	(Scotland) SCO	Zander McAllister	1	0	0	0	0	0	1	0	0	0
45	DF	(England) ENG	Emmanuel Longelo	20	1	13	0	0	0	0+1	0	4+2	1
47	FW	(England) ENG	Seb Palmer-Houlden	13	2	8+3	2	0	0	0	0	1+1	0
63	MF	(Wales) WAL	Dylan Levitt	7	1	3+4	1	0	0	0	0	0	0
71	MF	(Republic of Ireland) IRL	Joe Hodge	14	0	11	0	0	0	1	0	2	0
77	FW	(Switzerland) SUI	Willy Vogt	13	0	3+3	0	0	0	1	0	3+3	0
Players away from the club on loan:
24	FW	(Scotland) SCO	Luca Ross	4	0	0	0	0	0	1	0	0+3	0
25	MF	(Scotland) SCO	Olly Whyte	8	0	0+1	0	0	0	1	0	0+6	0
36	FW	(Scotland) SCO	Lucas Weir	1	0	0	0	0	0	0	0	0+1	0
Players who left Motherwell during the season:

=== Goal scorers ===
As of match played 7 November 2026

Ranking	Nation	Position	Number	Name	Scottish Premiership	Scottish Cup	League Cup	UEFA Conference League	Total
1	MF	(Austria)	8	Lukas Fadinger	3	0	0	2	5
2	FW	(Nigeria)	19	Ibrahim Said	2	0	0	2	4
3	MF	(Scotland)	11	Alex Lowry	3	0	0	0	3
3	FW	(Zimbabwe)	18	Tawanda Maswanhise	2	0	0	1	3
3	MF	(Grenada)	17	Regan Charles-Cook	1	0	0	2	3
6	FW	(England)	47	Seb Palmer-Houlden	2	0	0	0	2
7	FW	(Sweden)	13	Jardell Kanga	1	0	0	0	1
7	MF	(Wales)	63	Dylan Levitt	1	0	0	0	1
7	DF	(Austria)	5	Martin Moormann	0	0	0	1	1
7	DF	(England)	20	Dylan Williams	0	0	0	1	1
7	DF	(England)	45	Emmanuel Longelo	0	0	0	1	1
TOTALS					15	0	0	10	25

=== Clean sheets ===
As of match played 7 November 2026

Ranking	Nation	Position	Number	Name	Scottish Premiership	Scottish Cup	League Cup	UEFA Conference League	Total
1	GK	(New Zealand)	1	Alex Paulsen	3	0	0	3	6
TOTALS					3	0	0	3	6

=== Disciplinary record ===
As of match played 7 November 2026

Number	Nation	Position	Name	Premiership		Scottish Cup		League Cup		UEFA Conference League		Total	
Number	Nation	Position	Name	Yellow card	Red card	Yellow card	Red card	Yellow card	Red card	Yellow card	Red card	Yellow card	Red card
2	(Scotland)	DF	Stephen O'Donnell	1	0	0	0	0	0	0	0	1	0
3	(Australia)	DF	Jake Girdwood-Reich	0	0	0	0	0	0	1	1	1	1
4	(Canada)	DF	Jamie Knight-Lebel	0	0	0	0	0	0	1	0	1	0
5	(Austria)	DF	Martin Moormann	4	0	0	0	0	0	0	1	4	1
7	(Wales)	MF	Tom Sparrow	4	0	0	0	0	0	0	0	4	0
8	(Austria)	MF	Lukas Fadinger	2	0	0	0	1	0	1	0	4	0
11	(Scotland)	MF	Alex Lowry	0	0	0	0	0	0	2	0	2	0
12	(Australia)	MF	Oscar Priestman	1	0	0	0	0	0	1	0	2	0
14	(Scotland)	FW	Callum Hendry	1	0	0	0	0	0	0	0	1	0
17	(Grenada)	FW	Regan Charles-Cook	1	0	0	0	0	0	0	0	1	0
18	(Zimbabwe)	FW	Tawanda Maswanhise	1	0	0	0	0	0	0	0	1	0
19	(Nigeria)	FW	Ibrahim Said	2	0	0	0	1	0	0	0	3	0
20	(England)	DF	Dylan Williams	1	0	0	0	0	0	0	0	1	0
45	(England)	DF	Emmanuel Longelo	2	0	0	0	0	0	0	0	2	0
47	(England)	FW	Seb Palmer-Houlden	1	0	0	0	0	0	0	0	1	0
71	(Republic of Ireland)	MF	Joe Hodge	2	0	0	0	0	0	1	0	3	0
77	(Switzerland)	FW	Willy Vogt	0	0	0	0	1	0	0	0	1	0
Players away from the club on loan::
Players who left Motherwell during the season:
			TOTALS	23	0	0	0	3	0	7	2	34	2

=== Awards ===
==== Lime Player of the month ====
Awarded by an online vote of supporters on the official Motherwell F.C. website.

Month	Player	Ref.
July	(Austria) Lukas Fadinger	

== See also ==
- List of Motherwell F.C. seasons
