= List of Motherwell F.C. results by opponent =

Motherwell Football Club are a Scottish professional association football club based in Motherwell, North Lanarkshire. The club compete in the Scottish Premiership, Scotland's Top Flight, and have done so since 1984. The club was formed in 1886 as part of a merger between Alpha and Glencairn.

== Key ==
- The records include the results of matches played in the Scottish Football League, Scottish Premier League, Scottish Premiership, Scottish Cup and Scottish League Cup.
- The records exclude European matches. All records are from domestic competitions only.
- The records do not include matches played in regional tournaments, such as the Lanarkshire Cup.
- Wartime matches are regarded as unofficial and are excluded.
- The season given as the "first" denotes the season in which Motherwell first played a match against that team.
- The season given as the "last" designates the most recent season to have included a match between Motherwell and that side.
- P = matches played; W = matches won; D = matches drawn; L = matches lost; Win% = percentage of total matches won
- ^{†} Denotes clubs in the same division as Motherwell in the 2017–18 season.
- ^{‡} Denotes clubs which are now defunct.

== All–time statistics ==
As of 18 August 2017^{[a]}^{[b]}^{[c]}

Club	P	W	D	L	P	W	D	L	P	W	D	L	Win% (Note: Win percentage correct as of previous match played against that team.)	First	Last	Notes
Club	(Home)				(Away)				(Total)				Win%	First	Last	Notes
Abercorn	9	6	0	3	9	6	1	2	18	12	1	5	66.67	1893–94	1902–03	
Aberdeen	142	50	44	48	139	21	48	70	281	71	92	118	25.27	1905–06	2017-18	
Airdriehill	0	0	0	0	1	1	0	0	1	1	0	0	100.00	1889–90	1889–90	
Airdrieonians (1878)	75	0	12	24	77	29	14	34	152	68	26	58	44.74	1894–95	2001–02	(Note: Airdrieonians were liquidated in 2002. A new club known as Airdrie United was formed in 2002. The name was changed back to Airdrieonians in 2013.)
Airdrieonians	0	0	0	0	1	1	0	0	1	1	0	0	100.00	2006–07	2006–07	
Albion Rovers	12	10	2	0	13	8	4	1	25	18	6	1	72.00	1919–20	2013–14	
Alloa Athletic	3	3	0	0	3	2	1	0	6	5	1	0	83.33	1922–23	1968–69	
Annan Athletic	0	0	0	0	1	1	0	0	1	1	0	0	100.00	2016-17	2016-17	
Annbank	0	0	0	0	1	1	0	0	1	1	0	0	100.00	1910–11	1910–11	
Arthurlie	2	0	2	0	2	1	0	1	4	1	2	1	25.00	1901–02	1902–03	
Arbroath	11	8	2	1	10	3	3	4	21	11	5	5	52.38	1935–36	1979–80	
Ayr United	51	30	13	8	53	15	14	24	104	45	27	32	43.27	1897–98	1984–85	
Bathgate	1	1	0	0	0	0	0	0	1	1	0	0	100.00	1930–31	1930–31	(Note: Would re-emerge in junior football as Bathgate Thistle.)
Berwick Rangers	5	3	2	0	4	1	2	1	9	4	4	1	44.44	1968–69	2017–18	(Note: Berwick are the only English-based team to play Motherwell in domestic competition.)
Bo'ness	1	1	0	0	1	0	1	0	2	1	1	0	50.00	1927–28	1927–28	(Note: Was merged with Bo'ness Cadora to become junior team Bo'ness United.)
Breadalbane	1	1	0	0	0	0	0	0	1	1	0	0	100.00	1923–24	1923–24	
Brechin City	3	3	0	0	3	2	1	0	6	5	1	0	83.33	1968–69	2010–11	
Broxburn United	0	0	0	0	1	1	0	0	1	1	0	0	100.00	1913–14	1913–14	
Caledonian	1	1	0	0	1	1	0	0	2	2	0	0	100.00	1957–58	1969–70	
Cambuslang	0	0	0	0	1	0	0	1	1	0	0	1	00.00	1886–87	1886–87	
Campsie	1	1	0	0	0	0	0	0	1	1	0	0	100.00	1892–93	1892–93	
Carfin Shamrock	0	0	0	0	2	0	0	2	2	0	0	2	00.00	1887–88	1889–90	
Celtic	144	32	38	74	144	20	23	101	288	52	61	176	18.06	1903–04	2017-18	
Clyde	66	33	17	16	70	32	10	28	136	65	27	44	47.79	1893–94	2011–12	
Clydebank (1914)	7	5	2	0	7	3	1	3	14	8	3	3	57.14	1917–18	1925–26	(Note: The 1914 Clydebank went defunct in 1931.)
Clydebank (1965)	16	11	2	3	14	5	7	2	30	16	9	5	53.33	1968–69	1995–96	(Note: The 1965 Clydebank were liquidated in 2002. A new club under the same name was formed in 2003.)
Cove Rangers	1	1	0	0	0	0	0	0	1	1	0	0	100.00	2015–16	2015–16	
Cowdenbeath	13	10	1	2	13	8	3	2	26	18	4	4	69.23	1924–25	1970–71	
Cowlairs	2	2	0	0	0	0	0	2	4	2	0	2	50.00	1893–94	1894–95	
Drumpellier	1	1	0	0	0	0	0	0	1	1	0	0	100.00	1887–88	1887–88	
Dumbarton	19	12	5	2	20	6	6	8	39	18	11	10	46.15	1896–97	1981–82	
Dumfries	1	1	0	0	0	0	0	0	1	1	0	0	100.00	1887–88	1887–88	
Dundee	110	45	22	43	106	25	21	60	216	70	43	103	32.41	1903–04	2017-18	
Dundee United	106	45	18	43	109	24	36	49	215	69	54	92	32.09	1925–26	2015–16	
Dundee Wanderers	1	1	0	0	1	0	1	0	2	1	1	0	50.00	1894–95	1894–95	
Dunfermline Athletic	54	28	15	11	59	21	11	27	114	50	26	38	43.86	1926–27	2011–12	
East Fife	22	11	4	7	25	9	4	12	47	20	8	19	42.55	1930–31	2015–16	
East Stirlingshire	1-	6	2	2	9	5	2	2	19	11	4	4	57.89	1900–01	2016-17	
Edinburgh City	0	0	0	0	1	1	0	0	1	1	0	0	100.0	2017–18	2017–18	
Elgin City	1	1	0	0	0	0	0	0	1	1	0	0	100.00	1908–09	1908–09	
Falkirk	88	49	19	20	89	31	22	36	177	80	41	56	45.20	1902–03	2009–10	
Forfar Athletic	3	3	0	0	5	1	2	2	8	4	2	2	62.50	1953–54	2003–04	
Forres Mechanics	0	0	0	0	1	1	0	0	1	1	0	0	100.00	1954–55	1954–55	
Gala Fairydean	1	1	0	0	0	0	0	0	1	1	0	0	100.00	1933–34	1933–34	
Galston	2	2	0	0	1	0	0	1	3	2	0	1	66.66	1906–07	1936–37	
Greenock Morton	64	42	10	12	63	24	12	27	127	66	22	39	51.97	1893–94	2017–18	
Gretna	1	1	0	0	2	2	0	0	3	3	0	0	100.00	2007–08	2007–08	(Note: Gretna were liquidated in 2008.) (Note: All matches played at Fir Park due to Gretna groundsharing.)
Hamilton Academical	64	37	16	11	63	25	12	26	127	62	28	37	48.82	1897–98	2017-18	
Heart of Midlothian	139	54	25	60	141	29	34	78	280	83	59	138	29.64	1903–04	2017-18	
Hibernian	138	61	32	45	136	30	35	71	274	91	67	116	33.21	1893–94	2017-18	
Huntly	0	0	0	0	2	2	0	0	2	2	0	0	100.00	1927–28	1938–39	
Inverness Caledonian Thistle	24	12	2	10	23	14	1	8	47	26	3	18	55.32	2004–05	2016-17	
Inverurie Loco Works	0	0	0	0	1	1	0	0	1	1	0	0	100.00	2008–09	2008–09	
Keith	1	1	0	0	0	0	0	0	1	1	0	0	100.00	1959–60	1959–60	
Kilmarnock	114	58	21	35	113	45	17	51	227	103	38	86	45.37	1895–96	2017-18	
Leith Athletic	10	4	2	4	10	4	0	6	20	8	2	10	40.00	1895–96	1931–32	
Linthouse	5	2	1	2	4	2	1	2	10	4	2	4	40.00	1895–96	1899–1900	
Livingston	10	5	2	3	12	5	1	6	22	10	3	9	45.45	2001–02	2013–14	(Note: Livingston record includes the three matches played as Meadowbank Thistle.)
Montrose	5	4	0	1	3	2	0	1	8	6	0	2	75.00	1932–33	1971–72	
Nithsdale Wanderers	2	1	1	0	0	0	0	0	2	1	1	0	66.66	1910–11	1910–11	
Mossend Swifts	1	0	0	1	0	0	0	0	1	0	0	1	0.00	1894–95	1894–95	
Northern	1	1	0	0	1	0	1	0	2	1	1	0	66.66	1893–94	1893–94	
Partick Thistle	103	49	26	28	101	23	25	53	204	72	51	81	35.29	1893–94	2017-18	
Peterhead	1	1	0	0	0	0	0	0	1	1	0	0	100.00	1950–51	1950–51	
Port Glasgow Athletic	16	13	1	2	16	5	9	2	32	18	3	11	56.25	1893–94	1909–10	
Queen of the South	29	20	2	9	29	11	5	13	58	31	7	20	53.45	1933–34	2003–04	
Queen's Park	45	36	3	6	45	21	12	12	90	57	15	18	63.33	1903–04	2017–18	
Raith Rovers	50	29	8	13	50	20	10	20	100	49	33	18	49.00	1902–03	2007–08	
Rangers	138	31	28	79	140	10	18	112	281	41	46	194	14.59	1906–07	2017-18	
Renton	3	2	0	1	4	2	0	2	7	4	0	3	57.14	1894–95	1897–98	
Ross County	10	5	3	2	9	4	2	3	19	9	5	5	47.37	2012–13	2017-18	
Royal Albert	1	0	1	0	1	1	0	1	3	1	1	1	33.33	1888–89	1890–91	
St Bernard's	3	2	1	0	3	1	0	2	6	3	1	2	50.00	1900–01	1902–03	
St Johnstone	73	40	15	18	69	24	17	28	143	65	32	46	45.45	1924–25	2017-18	
St Mirren	104	59	23	22	109	30	28	51	213	89	51	73	41.78	1903–04	2014–15	
Stenhousemuir	2	2	0	0	2	1	0	1	4	3	0	1	75.00	1953–54	1968–69	
Stirling Albion	17	15	1	1	19	13	1	5	36	28	2	6	77.78	1949–50	1980–81	
Stranraer	1	1	0	0	4	4	0	0	5	5	0	0	100.00	1968–69	2016-17	
Third Lanark	52	23	14	15	52	22	11	19	104	45	25	34	43.27	1903–04	1964–65	(Note: Third Lanark were liquidated in 1967.)
Thistle	1	1	0	0	1	1	0	0	2	2	0	0	100.00	1893–94	1893–94	

a All matches are either League or Cup matches played either home or away, excluding those played at neutral venues.
b Results in all competitions until July 2012 are sourced to Fir Park Corner. Results in all competitions post July 2012 are sourced to BBC Sport.
c Type in a team to get all head-to-head results against that team.

== Matches played at neutral venues ==
As of 24 September 2011.^{[a]}

Club	P	W	D	L	Win%	Notes
Aberdeen	2	1	1	0	50.00	
Airdrieonians	3	0	1	2	00.00	
Ayr United	1	1	0	0	100.00	
Celtic	11	1	3	8	09.10	(Note: One match was decided on penalties, won by Celtic.)
Clyde	2	1	0	1	50.00	
Dundee	2	1	0	1	50.00	
Dundee United	3	1	0	2	33.33	
Duns	1	1	0	0	100.00	(Note: Duns went out of business in 1976.)
East Fife	1	1	0	0	100.00	
Greenock Morton	1	0	0	1	00.00	
Heart of Midlothian	4	1	1	2	25.00	
Hibernian	3	2	0	1	66.66	
Rangers	4	0	0	4	00.00	
St Johnstone	2	1	0	1	50.00	
St Mirren	3	1	0	2	33.33	

a All matches are either Semi-final or Final of cup competitions

== European matches ==
For Motherwell matches in Europe, see Motherwell F.C. in European football
