= Lukas Fadinger =

Austrian footballer

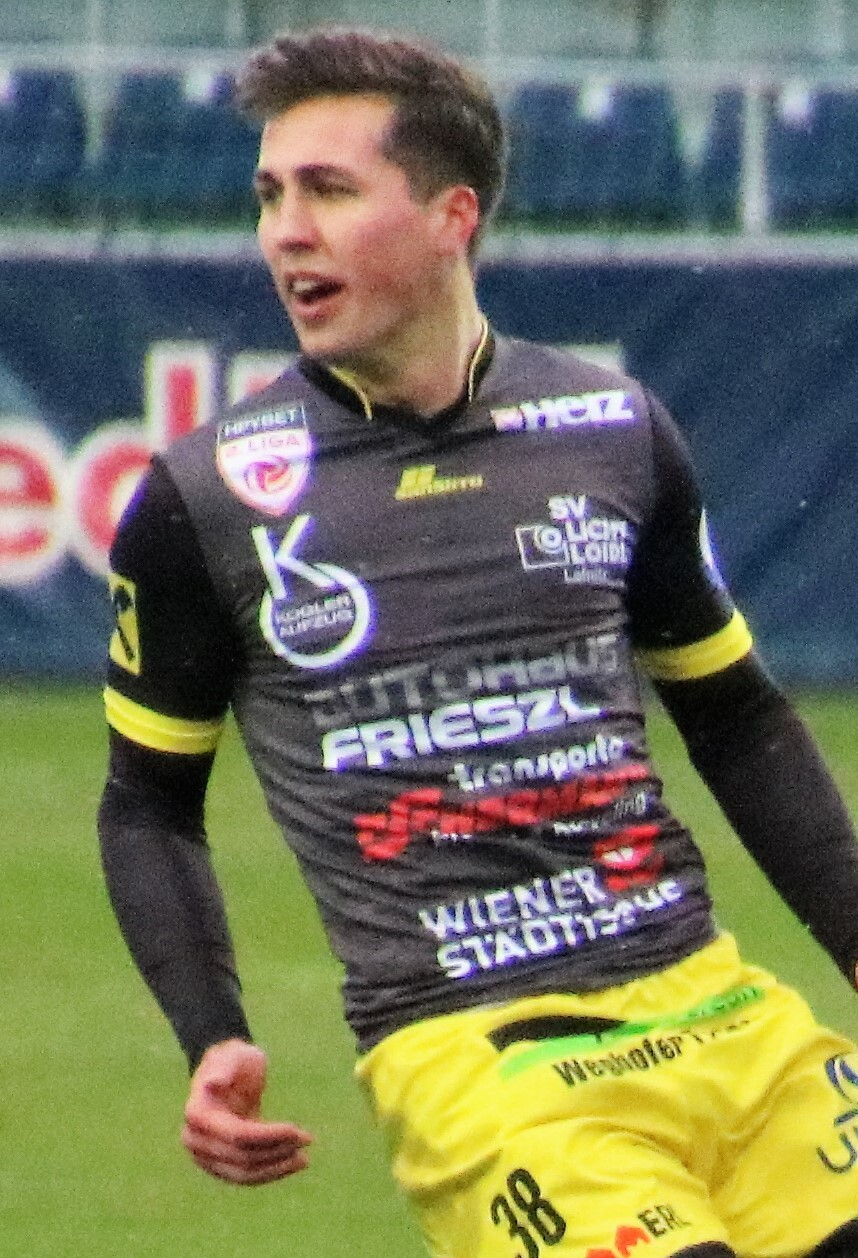
- Fadinger in 2020

Personal information
- Date of birth: 27 September 2000 (age 26)
- Place of birth: Weiz, Austria
- Height: 1.72 m (5 ft 8 in)

Team information
- Current team: Motherwell
- Number: 8

Youth career
- 2007–2008: USV Mitterdorf/R.
- 2008–2017: Sturm Graz

Senior career*
Years	Team	Apps	(Gls)
2017–2020	Sturm Graz II	36	(3)
2017–2020	Sturm Graz	2	(0)
2019–2020	→ SV Lafnitz (loan)	24	(2)
2020–2023	TSV Hartberg	30	(2)
2021–2022	→ SV Lafnitz (loan)	38	(7)
2023–2025	Rheindorf Altach	56	(3)
2025–	Motherwell	45	(5)

International career^{‡}
2015	Austria U16	1	(0)
2019	Austria U21	1	(0)
- * Club domestic league appearances and goals as of 4 November 2026 ‡ National team caps and goals as of 18 November 2019

Lukas Fadinger (born 27 September 2000) is an Austrian professional footballer who plays for Scottish Premiership club Motherwell.

== Career ==
=== Sturm Graz ===
On 11 June 2019 SK Sturm Graz announced, that Fadinger had been loaned out to SV Lafnitz for the 2019–20 season.

=== TSV Hartberg ===
On 11 September 2020 he signed with TSV Hartberg.

=== Rheindorf Altach ===
Before the 2023–24 season, Fadinger signed a two-year contract with Rheindorf Altach.

=== Motherwell ===
Fadinger signed a two-year contract with Scottish Premiership club Motherwell in May 2025. On 19 May 2026, Motherwell announced that Fadinger had signed a one-year contract extension that will see him remain at the club until 2028.

== Career statistics ==
=== Club ===
As of match played 31 October 2026

Appearances and goals by club, season and competition
Club	Season	League			National Cup (Note: Includes Austrian Cup and Scottish Cup)		League Cup (Note: Includes Scottish League Cup)		Other		Total	
Club	Season	Division	Apps	Goals	Apps	Goals	Apps	Goals	Apps	Goals	Apps	Goals
TSV Hartberg	2022–23	Austrian Bundesliga	30	2	1	0	-		-		31	2
Rheindorf Altach	2023–24	Austrian Bundesliga	31	3	4	1	-		-		35	4
Rheindorf Altach	2024–25	Austrian Bundesliga	25	0	0	0	-		-		25	0
Rheindorf Altach	Total		56	3	4	1	-	-	-	-	60	4
Motherwell	2025–26	Scottish Premiership	34	3	2	0	7	2	-		43	5
Motherwell	2026–27	Scottish Premiership	11	2	0	0	1	0	6 (Note: Appearances and goals in the UEFA Conference League)	2	18	4
Motherwell	Total		45	5	2	0	8	2	6	2	61	9
Career total			131	10	7	1	8	2	6	2	152	15
