= Mikey Booth =

Scottish footballer

Personal information
- Date of birth: 2 January 2007 (age 19)
- Place of birth: Wishaw, Scotland
- Position: Midfielder

Team information
- Current team: Motherwell
- Number: 27

Youth career
- –2025: Motherwell

Senior career*
Years	Team	Apps	(Gls)
2023–	Motherwell	1	(0)
- * Club domestic league appearances and goals as of 10 August 2026

Mikey Booth (born 2 January 2007) is a Scottish footballer who plays as a Midfielder for Scottish Premiership club Motherwell.

== Career ==
=== Club ===
In April 2025, Booth won Motherwell's Academy Player of the Year for the 2024–25 season. On 28 May 2025, Motherwell announced that Booth had extended his contract with the club. At the end of the 2025–26 season, Motherwell again announced that Booth had agreed a contract extension with the club. During pre-season for the 2026–27 season, Booth came on as a substitute and scored against KRC Genk on 17 July 2026. The following week, on 23 July 2026, Booth made his debut for Motherwell, playing the full 90minutes in Motherwells 2-0 victory over Faroese club HB in the UEFA Conference League.

== Career statistics ==
As of match played on 16 August 2026

Appearances and goals by club, season and competition
Club	Season	League			National Cup (Note: Includes Scottish Cup)		League Cup (Note: Includes Scottish League Cup)		Continental		Other		Total	
Club	Season	Division	Apps	Goals	Apps	Goals	Apps	Goals	Apps	Goals	Apps	Goals	Apps	Goals
Motherwell	2023–24	Scottish Premiership	0	0	0	0	0	0	—				0	0
Motherwell	2024–25	Scottish Premiership	0	0	0	0	0	0	—				0	0
Motherwell	2025–26	Scottish Premiership	0	0	0	0	0	0	—				0	0
Motherwell	2026–27	Scottish Premiership	1	0	0	0	1	0	4 (Note: Appearances and goals in the UEFA Conference League)	0	—		6	0
Motherwell	Total		1	0	0	0	1	0	4	0	—		6	0
Career total			1	0	0	0	1	0	4	0	—		6	0
