= Joe Hodge =

Footballer (born 2002)

Personal information
- Full name: Joseph Shaun Hodge
- Date of birth: 14 September 2002 (age 24)
- Place of birth: Manchester, England
- Height: 1.67 m (5 ft 6 in)
- Position: Midfielder

Team information
- Current team: Motherwell
- Number: 71

Youth career
- Manchester City

Senior career*
Years	Team	Apps	(Gls)
2021	Manchester City	0	(0)
2021	→ Derry City (loan)	0	(0)
2021–2025	Wolverhampton Wanderers	6	(0)
2024	→ Queens Park Rangers (loan)	8	(1)
2024–2025	→ Huddersfield Town (loan)	27	(1)
2025–2026	Tondela	26	(1)
2026–	Motherwell	5	(0)

International career^{‡}
2018–2019	Republic of Ireland U17	9	(0)
2019	Republic of Ireland U19	4	(1)
2022–2024	Republic of Ireland U21	10	(1)
2026–	Republic of Ireland	1	(0)
- * Club domestic league appearances and goals as of 22:25, 26 September 2026 (UTC) ‡ National team caps and goals as of 22:25, 26 September 2026 (UTC)

Joseph Shaun Hodge (born 14 September 2002) is an Irish professional footballer who plays as a midfielder for Scottish Premiership side Motherwell. Born in Manchester, England, Hodge plays for the Republic of Ireland national team.

== Club career ==
=== Manchester City ===
Hodge started his career with Premier League side Manchester City. Before the 2021 season, he was sent on loan to League of Ireland Premier Division club Derry City but departed the club without making a competitive appearance due to injury.

=== Wolverhampton Wanderers ===
In 2021, Hodge signed for English Premier League club Wolverhampton Wanderers. He made his Premier League debut against Chelsea on 8 October 2022. On 1 February 2024, Hodge was loaned to EFL Championship club Queens Park Rangers until the end of the season. On 28 August 2024, he was loaned out to League One side Huddersfield Town for the season.

=== Tondela ===
On 18 July 2025, Hodge joined newly promoted Primeira Liga club Tondela on a four-year deal. He scored 1 goal in 29 appearances in all competitions during his first season with the club, as they were relegated to Liga Portugal 2. In August 2026, he was reportedly due to sign for an unnamed Scottish Premiership club, but the move was on the verge of collapse due to a compensation dispute between Tondela and Hodge's former club Wolverhampton Wanderers.

=== Motherwell ===
On 12 August 2026, Hodge joined Scottish Premiership side Motherwell for an undisclosed fee on a two-year contract with the option of a third year.

== International career ==
Hodge played at several youth levels for the Republic of Ireland and captained the Republic of Ireland U21 side. On 5 June 2026, Hodge made his senior Republic of Ireland debut, as a substitute in a 1–1 draw with Canada at the Saputo Stadium in Montreal.

== Career statistics ==
=== Club ===
As of match played 16 May 2026

Appearances and goals by club, season and competition
Club	Season	League			National Cup (Note: Includes FA Cup, FAI Cup, Taça de Portugal & Scottish Cup)		League Cup (Note: Includes EFL Cup, Taça da Liga & Scottish League Cup)		Other		Total	
Club	Season	Division	Apps	Goals	Apps	Goals	Apps	Goals	Apps	Goals	Apps	Goals
Manchester City	2021–22	Premier League	0	0	0	0	0	0	0	0	0	0
Derry City (loan)	2021	LOI Premier Division	0	0	0	0	—		0	0	0	0
Wolverhampton Wanderers U21	2022–23	—			—		—		2 (Note: Appearances in EFL Trophy)	2	2	2
Wolverhampton Wanderers	2022–23	Premier League	6	0	2	0	3	0	—		11	0
Wolverhampton Wanderers	2023–24	Premier League	0	0	1	0	1	0	—		2	0
Wolverhampton Wanderers	2024–25	Premier League	0	0	—		0	0	—		0	0
Wolverhampton Wanderers	Total		6	0	3	0	4	0	0	0	13	0
Queens Park Rangers (loan)	2023–24	EFL Championship	8	1	—		—		—		8	1
Huddersfield Town (loan)	2024–25	EFL League One	27	1	0	0	—		0	0	27	1
Tondela	2025–26	Primeira Liga	26	1	2	0	1	0	—		29	1
Tondela	2026–27	Liga Portugal 2	0	0	—		—		—		0	0
Tondela	Total		26	1	2	0	1	0	–		29	1
Motherwell	2026–27	Scottish Premiership	0	0	0	0	0	0	0	0	0	0
Career total			67	3	5	0	5	0	2	2	79	5

=== International ===
As of match played on 5 June 2026

Appearances and goals by national team and year
National team	Year	Apps	Goals
Republic of Ireland
Republic of Ireland	2026	1	0
Total		1	0

== Honours ==
Manchester City

- FA Youth Cup: 2019–20
