= Jamie Knight-Lebel =

Canadian soccer player

Personal information
- Full name: Jamie Mathieu Knight-Lebel
- Date of birth: December 24, 2004 (age 21)
- Place of birth: Montreal, Quebec, Canada
- Height: 1.88 m (6 ft 2 in)
- Position: Centre-back

Team information
- Current team: Motherwell (on loan from Bristol City)
- Number: 4

Youth career
- Stapleton AFC
- DRG Frenchay
- Southampton
- 2019–2023: Bristol City

Senior career*
Years	Team	Apps	(Gls)
2023–	Bristol City	2	(0)
2024–2025	→ Crewe Alexandra (loan)	33	(3)
2025–2026	→ Swindon Town (loan)	30	(1)
2026–	→ Motherwell (loan)	6	(0)

International career^{‡}
2022	Canada U20	4	(0)
2024–	Canada	5	(0)
- * Club domestic league appearances and goals as of October 28, 2026 ‡ National team caps and goals as of October 3, 2026

Jamie Mathieu Knight-Lebel (born December 24, 2004) is a Canadian professional soccer player who plays as a centre-back for Scottish Premiership club Motherwell, on loan from Bristol City, and the Canada national team.

== Early life ==
Knight-Lebel was born in Montreal to a Canadian father and a Welsh mother, and moved with his family to Bristol, England when he was five years-old. He attended Fairfield High School, Bristol.

He began playing youth soccer at age five with Stapleton AFC. He later played with DRG Frenchay and the Southampton academy, before joining the Bristol City academy at age 14, progressing through various age groups up to the U23 level. He served as captain of City's U21 team in the 2022–23 and 2023–24 seasons, and was nominated for the 2023 Championship Apprentice of the Season.

== Club career ==
In May 2022, Knight-Lebel signed a three-year professional contract with Bristol City. On October 28, 2023, he made his league debut away against Cardiff City. In March 2024, Knight-Lebel signed a new three-year contract at Bristol City.

On June 24, 2024, Knight-Lebel signed for EFL League Two club Crewe Alexandra on a season-long loan. On August 13, he made his debut for his new club against Rotherham United in the EFL Cup. On December 29, 2024, he scored his first professional goal in Crewe's 1–1 draw at Milton Keynes Dons. On February 11, 2025, Knight-Lebel conceded a penalty and was red-carded in Crewe's 3–0 defeat at AFC Wimbledon.

Knight-Lebel played regularly on season-long loan at EFL League Two side Swindon Town during 2025-26, making 35 appearances in all competitions and was named Swindon's Young Player of the Season. He signed a new three-year contract with Bristol City in April 2026.

Knight-Lebel joined Scottish Premiership club Motherwell on loan for the 2026–27 season and played for the club in the UEFA Conference League qualifying rounds.

== International career ==
In April 2022, Knight-Lebel was called up to the Canada U20 team for two friendlies against Costa Rica. In June 2022, he was named to the squad for the 2022 CONCACAF U-20 Championship.

In February 2024, Knight-Lebel was named in the Canada national soccer team provisional roster for the 2024 Copa América qualifying play-offs against Trinidad and Tobago. In October 2024, he was named to the official squad for the first time, for a friendly match against Panama. On November 19, 2024, he made his senior international debut in a CONCACAF Nations League match against Suriname.

== Personal life ==
In 2024, he was studying for a sports science diploma alongside his playing career. In addition to his native English, he can also speak French.

== Career statistics ==
=== Club ===
As of match played October 28, 2026

Appearances and goals by club, season and competition
Club	Season	League			National cup		League cup		Continental		Other		Total	
Club	Season	Division	Apps	Goals	Apps	Goals	Apps	Goals	Apps	Goals	Apps	Goals	Apps	Goals
Bristol City	2023–24	Championship	2	0	1	0	0	0	—		—		3	0
Bristol City	2024–25	Championship	0	0	0	0	0	0	—		—		0	0
Bristol City	2025–26	Championship	0	0	0	0	0	0	—		—		0	0
Bristol City	Total		2	0	1	0	0	0	—		—		3	0
Crewe Alexandra (loan)	2024–25	League Two	33	3	1	0	1	0	—		3 (Note: Appearances in EFL Trophy)	0	38	3
Swindon Town (loan)	2025–26	League Two	30	1	2	0	0	0	—		3	0	35	1
Motherwell (loan)	2026–27	Scottish Premiership	6	0	0	0	1	0	4 (Note: Appearances in UEFA Conference League)	0	—		11	0
Career total			71	4	4	0	2	0	1	0	9	0	87	4

=== International ===
As of match played October 3, 2025

Appearances and goals by national team and year
National team	Year	Apps	Goals
Canada	2024	1	0
Canada	2025	2	0
Canada	2026	2	0
Total		5	0
