= Jardell Kanga =

Swedish footballer (born 2005)

Personal information
- Date of birth: 13 December 2005 (age 20)
- Place of birth: Stockholm, Sweden
- Height: 1.70 m (5 ft 7 in)
- Positions: Attacking midfielder; winger

Team information
- Current team: Motherwell
- Number: 13

Youth career
- 2016–2021: Brommapojkarna
- 2022–2024: Bayer Leverkusen

Senior career*
| Years | Team | Apps | (Gls) |
| 2021–2022 | Brommapojkarna | 23 | (5) |
| 2022–2024 | Bayer Leverkusen | 0 | (0) |
| 2024 | → De Graafschap (loan) | 1 | (0) |
| 2024 | Hammarby IF | 1 | (0) |
| 2024 | Hammarby TFF | 10 | (2) |
| 2025–2026 | Ilves | 47 | (15) |
| 2026– | Motherwell | 3 | (1) |

International career^{‡}
| 2021–2022 | Sweden U17 | 12 | (7) |
| 2023 | Sweden U19 | 5 | (0) |
| 2025–2026 | Sweden U21 | 5 | (0) |
- * Club domestic league appearances and goals as of 6 September 2026 ‡ National team caps and goals as of 17:16, 6 October 2026 (UTC)

Jardell Kanga (born 13 December 2005) is a Swedish professional footballer who plays as an attacking midfielder or winger for Scottish Premiership club Motherwell

== Club career ==
Kanga is a youth product of Brommapojkarna. He began his senior career with them in 2021 in the Ettan and became their youngest ever debutant at 15 years old and 3 months, their youngest ever goalscorer, and helped them achieve promotion into the Superettan that season. On 20 January 2022, he signed with German Bundesliga club Bayer Leverkusen, and was assigned to their under-19s. In September 2022, he was named by English newspaper The Guardian as one of the best players born in 2005 worldwide.

On 1 February 2024, Kanga joined De Graafschap in the Dutch second-tier Eerste Divisie on loan until the end of the season. He made his debut for the Superboeren on 9 February, replacing David Flakus Bosilj in the 74th minute of a 2–0 home loss to Willem II.

On 13 July 2024, Kanga signed for Swedish side Hammarby IF on a contract until December 2028.

On 2 April 2025, Kanga was loaned to Veikkausliiga club Ilves with an option-to-buy. On 19 July, his transfer was made permanent for an undisclosed fee. Kanga and Ilves signed a contract until the end of 2027.

=== Motherwell ===
On 28 August 2026, Kanga joined Scottish Premiership club Motherwell on a three-year contract, for an initial €400,000 transfer fee, which could reach €1 million due to bonuses.

== International career ==
Kanga is a youth international for Sweden having played for the Sweden U17s, and is their record goalscorer at that level. He represented the country at the 2022 UEFA European Under-17 Championship, where they were eliminated at the group stage.

== Personal life ==
Born in Sweden, Kanga is of DR Congolese descent. He is the cousin of the Swedish footballer Josafat Mendes.

== Career statistics ==
As of 6 September 2026

Appearances and goals by club, season and competition
| Club | Season | League | | | National cup | | Europe | | Other | | Total | |
| Club | Season | Division | Apps | Goals | Apps | Goals | Apps | Goals | Apps | Goals | Apps | Goals |
|---|---|---|---|---|---|---|---|---|---|---|---|---|
| Brommapojkarna | 2021 | Ettan Norra | 23 | 5 | 1 | 0 | — | | — | | 24 | 5 |
| Bayer Leverkusen | 2021–22 | Bundesliga | 0 | 0 | 0 | 0 | 0 | 0 | — | | 0 | 0 |
| Bayer Leverkusen | 2022–23 | Bundesliga | 0 | 0 | 0 | 0 | 0 | 0 | — | | 0 | 0 |
| Bayer Leverkusen | 2023–24 | Bundesliga | 0 | 0 | 0 | 0 | 0 | 0 | — | | 0 | 0 |
| Bayer Leverkusen | Total | | 0 | 0 | 0 | 0 | 0 | 0 | 0 | 0 | 0 | 0 |
| De Graafschap (loan) | 2023–24 | Eerste Divisie | 1 | 0 | 0 | 0 | — | | 0 | 0 | 1 | 0 |
| Hammarby | 2024 | Allsvenskan | 1 | 0 | 2 | 0 | — | | — | | 3 | 0 |
| Hammarby TFF | 2024 | Ettan | 10 | 2 | — | | — | | — | | 10 | 2 |
| Ilves | 2025 | Veikkausliiga | 27 | 5 | 1 | 0 | 4 | 0 | — | | 32 | 5 |
| Ilves | 2026 | Veikkausliiga | 20 | 10 | 4 | 2 | 6 | 1 | — | | 30 | 13 |
| Ilves | Total | | 47 | 15 | 5 | 2 | 10 | 1 | 0 | 0 | 62 | 18 |
| Motherwell | 2026-27 | Scottish Premiership | 3 | 1 | 0 | 0 | 0 | 0 | — | | 3 | 1 |
| Career total | | | 85 | 23 | 8 | 2 | 10 | 1 | 0 | 0 | 103 | 26 |
