= Dylan Williams (footballer, born 2003) =

English footballer

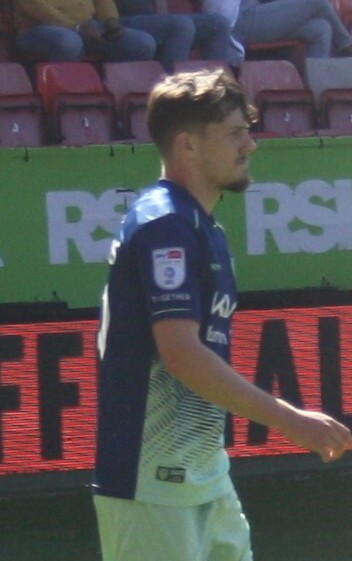
- Williams in 2025

Personal information
- Full name: Dylan Riley Williams
- Date of birth: 13 September 2003 (age 23)
- Place of birth: Shrewsbury, England
- Height: 1.77 m (5 ft 10 in)
- Position: Left-back

Team information
- Current team: Motherwell
- Number: 20

Youth career
- –2019: Wolverhampton Wanderers
- 2019–2021: Derby County

Senior career*
Years	Team	Apps	(Gls)
2021–2022	Derby County	6	(0)
2022–2025	Chelsea	0	(0)
2024–2025	→ Burton Albion (loan)	26	(1)
2025–2026	Burton Albion	26	(0)
2026–	Motherwell	0	(0)
- * Club domestic league appearances and goals as of 16 April 2026

Dylan Riley Williams (born 13 September 2003) is an English footballer who plays as a left-back for Scottish Premiership side Motherwell.

== Club career ==
Williams made his debut for Derby County in a 2–0 FA Cup loss to Chorley on 9 January 2021. He was one of fourteen players from Derby County's academy to make their debut in the game, after the entirety of Derby's first team squad and coaching team were forced to isolate due to a COVID-19 outbreak. He made his second appearance, appearing alongside members of Derby County's first team, in a 3–3 Carabao Cup draw against Salford City on 10 August 2021.

On 22 January 2022, he signed a professional contract with Chelsea.

On 3 July 2024, Williams joined Burton Albion on a season-long loan, with an obligation to buy if certain conditions are met.

On 2 May 2025, it was announced that Williams would join Burton Albion permanently in the coming summer transfer window.

On 20 July 2026, Scottish Premiership club Motherwell announced the signing of Williams from Burton Albion for an undisclosed fee, on a contract until the summer of 2028 with the option for an additional year.

== Career statistics ==
As of match played 10 January 2026

Appearances and goals by club, season and competition
Club	Season	League			National Cup (Note: Includes FA Cup and Scottish Cup)		League Cup (Note: Includes EFL Cup and Scottish League Cup)		Continental		Other		Total	
Club	Season	Division	Apps	Goals	Apps	Goals	Apps	Goals	Apps	Goals	Apps	Goals	Apps	Goals
Derby County	2020–21	Championship	0	0	1	0	0	0	–		–		1	0
Derby County	2021–22	Championship	6	0	0	0	2	0	–		–		8	0
Derby County	Total		6	0	1	0	2	0	–		–		9	0
Chelsea	2021–22	Premier League	0	0	0	0	0	0	–		–		0	0
Chelsea U21	2022–23	—			—		–		—		4 (Note: Appearances in EFL Trophy)	0	4	0
Chelsea U21	2023–24	—			—		–		—		3	0	3	0
Chelsea U21	Total		–		–		–		–		7	0	7	0
Burton Albion (loan)	2024–25	League One	26	1	2	0	1	0	–		4	1	33	2
Burton Albion	2025–26	League One	26	0	2	1	2	0	–		1	0	31	1
Motherwell	2026–27	Scottish Premiership	0	0	0	0	0	0	0 (Note: Appearances in the UEFA Conference League)	0	–		0	0
Career total			58	1	5	1	5	0	0	0	12	1	80	3
