= Seb Palmer-Houlden =

English footballer (born 2003)

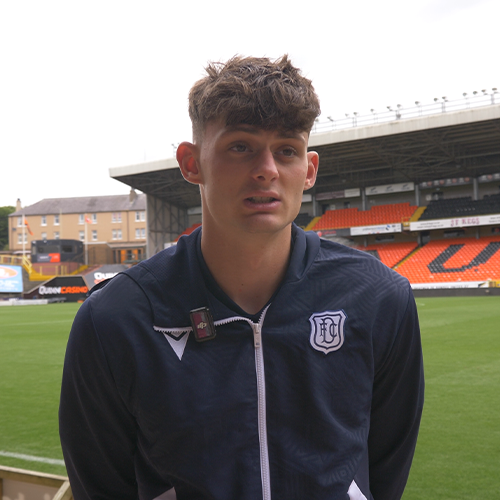
- Palmer-Houlden in 2024

Personal information
- Full name: Sebastian Palmer-Houlden
- Date of birth: 14 November 2003 (age 22)
- Place of birth: Bristol, England
- Height: 1.87 m (6 ft 2 in)
- Position: Forward

Team information
- Current team: Motherwell
- Number: 47

Youth career
- –2025: Bristol City

Senior career*
Years	Team	Apps	(Gls)
2022–2025	Bristol City	0	(0)
2022	→ Chippenham Town (loan)	5	(0)
2023	→ Yeovil Town (loan)	3	(0)
2023–2024	→ Newport County (loan)	34	(7)
2024–2025	→ Dundee (loan)	33	(5)
2025–2026	Gillingham	35	(4)
2026–	Motherwell	3	(1)
- * Club domestic league appearances and goals as of 17:00, 5 September 2026 (UTC)

Sebastian Palmer-Houlden (born 14 November 2003) is a professional footballer who plays as a forward for Scottish Premiership club Motherwell. He was previously on the books of Bristol City and Gillingham and played on loan for Chippenham Town, Yeovil Town, Newport County, and Dundee.

== Early life ==
His time as a child was split between his mother, Gayle, in Knowle, Bristol and his father Simon in Bath. He started playing with Bath City youth teams when he was seven and was briefly playing with Bristol Rovers before he was scouted by Bristol City. He attended Wellsway School.

== Career ==
=== Bristol City ===
Palmer-Houlden started playing for Bristol City age group teams at eight years-old. He signed a professional contract with the club in May 2022.

He spent some time on loan with Chippenham Town at the start of the 2022–23 season. In September 2022, his contract with Bristol City was extended into 2024. He spent time during 2023 on loan at Yeovil Town.

In July 2023, Palmer-Holden was included in the Bristol City first-team squad on a pre-season training camp in Austria. His contract with the club was extended by twelve months.

In July 2023 Palmer-Houlden joined Newport County of EFL League Two on a season-long loan. He made his league debut on 5 August 2023 in the starting line-up for Newport against Accrington Stanley. Palmer-Houlden scored his first goal for Newport on 8 August 2023 in the 3–1 EFL Cup First Round win against Charlton Athletic. In early September 2023 he was ruled out for three months with a hamstring injury. In February 2024, having scored seven goals in 28 appearances in all competitions for Newport, he signed a new contract with Bristol City keeping him at the club until 2027. In April 2024 Palmer-Houlden was selected as Newport County Young Player of the Year.

==== Dundee (loan) ====
On 21 June 2024, Palmer-Houlden joined Scottish Premiership club Dundee on a season-long loan deal. Palmer-Houlden made his competitive debut for the "Dark Blues" on 16 July, coming on as a substitute in an away win over Arbroath in the Scottish League Cup. He opened his scoring account the following week with a goal over Annan Athletic. Four days later, Palmer-Houlden followed that first goal up with a brace in a 6–0 defeat of Inverness Caledonian Thistle. Palmer-Houlden scored his first league goal for the Dee in their league opener in the Dundee derby against local rivals Dundee United. After suffering a knee injury away to Ross County in February 2025 which was initially feared to be significant, Palmer-Houlden returned to the pitch on 5 April as a substitute in a home win over St Mirren. After helping the "Dee" avoid relegation, Palmer-Houlden returned to Bristol City at the end of the season.

=== Gillingham ===
On 23 May 2025, Palmer-Houlden agreed to join League Two side Gillingham on a three-year deal for an undisclosed fee, joining on 1 June when the transfer window opened. After struggling with injury issues to start the season, Palmer-Houlden made his first appearance for the side off the bench on 20 September in an away league win over former club Newport County.

=== Motherwell ===
On 19 August 2026, Scottish Premiership club Motherwell announced the signing of Palmer-Houlden from Gillingham for an undisclosed fee; the player signed a two-year contract with the option of an additional year. He made his debut for the Steelmen the next day as a substitute at home in a UEFA Conference League qualifying leg against German side SC Freiburg. On 2 September, Palmer-Houlden scored his first Motherwell goal in a home league win over Dundee United.

== Career statistics ==
As of match played 5 September 2026

Appearances and goals by club, season and competition
Club	Season	League			National cup (Note: Includes FA Cup, Scottish Cup)		League cup (Note: Includes EFL Cup, Scottish League Cup)		Other		Total	
Club	Season	Division	Apps	Goals	Apps	Goals	Apps	Goals	Apps	Goals	Apps	Goals
Bristol City	2022–23	Championship	0	0	0	0	0	0	—		0	0
Bristol City	2023–24	Championship	0	0	0	0	0	0	—		0	0
Bristol City	2024–25	Championship	0	0	0	0	0	0	—		0	0
Bristol City	Total		0	0	0	0	0	0	—		0	0
Chippenham Town (loan)	2022–23	National League South	5	0	0	0	—		0	0	5	0
Yeovil Town (loan)	2022–23	National League	3	0	—		—		—		3	0
Newport County (loan)	2023–24	League Two	32	7	5	1	2	1	1 (Note: Appearances in EFL Trophy)	0	40	9
Dundee (loan)	2024–25	Scottish Premiership	33	5	1	0	5	4	—		39	9
Gillingham	2025–26	League Two	34	4	1	1	0	0	0	0	35	5
Gillingham	2026–27	League Two	1	0	0	0	1	0	0	0	2	0
Gillingham	Total		35	4	1	1	1	0	0	0	37	5
Motherwell	2026–27	Scottish Premiership	3	1	0	0	—		2 (Note: Appearance(s) in the UEFA Conference League)	0	5	1
Career total			111	17	7	2	8	5	3	0	129	24
