= Oscar Priestman =

Australian soccer player (born 2003)

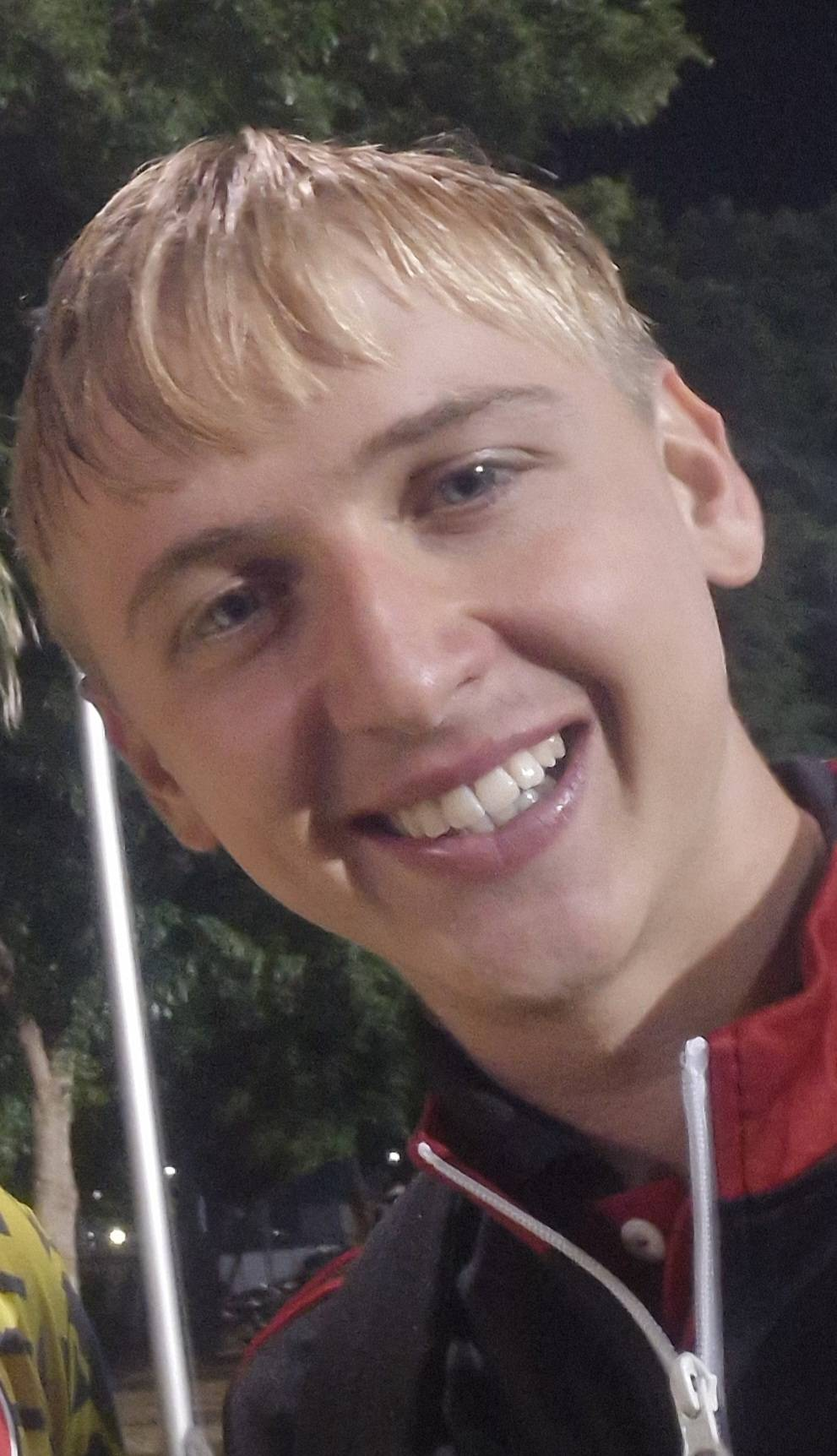
- Priestman in 2025

Personal information
- Full name: Oscar James Moncrieff Priestman
- Date of birth: 25 March 2003 (age 23)
- Place of birth: London, England
- Height: 1.75 m (5 ft 9 in)
- Position: Defensive midfielder

Team information
- Current team: Motherwell
- Number: 12

Youth career
- –2023: Sydney FC NPL
- 2023–2025: Western Sydney Wanderers NPL

Senior career*
Years	Team	Apps	(Gls)
2022–2023	Sydney FC	0	(0)
2023–2025	Western Sydney Wanderers	51	(2)
2025–	Motherwell	28	(0)

International career^{‡}
2025	Australia U23	3	(0)
- * Club domestic league appearances and goals as of 20 May 2026 ‡ National team caps and goals as of 13 February 2026

Oscar James Moncrieff Priestman (born 25 March 2003) is a professional soccer player who plays as a defensive midfielder for Scottish Premiership club Motherwell. Born in England, he represents Australia th level.

== Club career ==
Priestman started his career with the reserve team of Australian side Sydney FC, where he made twenty-six league appearances and scored one goal. Priestman also made his professional debut for Sydney FC having appeared in two Australia Cup matches in 2022.

Ahead of the 2023–24 season, he signed for Australian side Western Sydney Wanderers FC, where he made fifty-one league appearances and scored two goals and helped the club achieve qualification for the 2025 A-League Men finals series. Following his stint there, he signed for Scottish side Motherwell FC during the summer of 2025.

== International career ==
Priestman is an Australia youth international. On 19 March 2025, he debuted for the Australia men's national under-23 soccer team during a 2–1 away friendly win over the Croatia national under-21 football team.

== Style of play ==
Priestman plays as a midfielder and is right-footed. Danish manager Jens Berthel Askou said in 2025 that "he's shown his big talent and potential as a dynamic and athletic central midfielder with good feet, solid body language and a great workrate".

== Career statistics ==
=== Club ===
As of match played 23 July 2026

Appearances and goals by club, season and competition
Club	Season	League			National Cup (Note: Includes Australia Cup and Scottish Cup)		League Cup (Note: Includes Scottish League Cup)		Continental		Other		Total	
Club	Season	Division	Apps	Goals	Apps	Goals	Apps	Goals	Apps	Goals	Apps	Goals	Apps	Goals
Sydney FC	2022–23	A-League Men	0	0	2	0	-		-		0 (Note: Appearances in the A-League Men finals series)	0	2	0
Western Sydney Wanderers	2023–24	A-League Men	25	0	3	0	-		-		-		28	0
Western Sydney Wanderers	2024–25	A-League Men	25	1	3	0	-		-		1	0	29	1
Western Sydney Wanderers	2025–26	A-League Men	0	0	1	0	-		-		-		1	0
Western Sydney Wanderers	Total		50	1	7	0	-	-	-	-	1	0	58	1
Motherwell	2025–26	Scottish Premiership	28	0	2	0	1	0	-		-		31	0
Motherwell	2026–27	Scottish Premiership	0	0	0	0	0	0	1	0	-		1	0
Motherwell	Total		28	0	2	0	1	0	1	0	-	-	32	0
Career total			78	1	11	0	1	0	1	0	1	0	92	1
