= Martin Moormann =

Austrian footballer (born 2001)

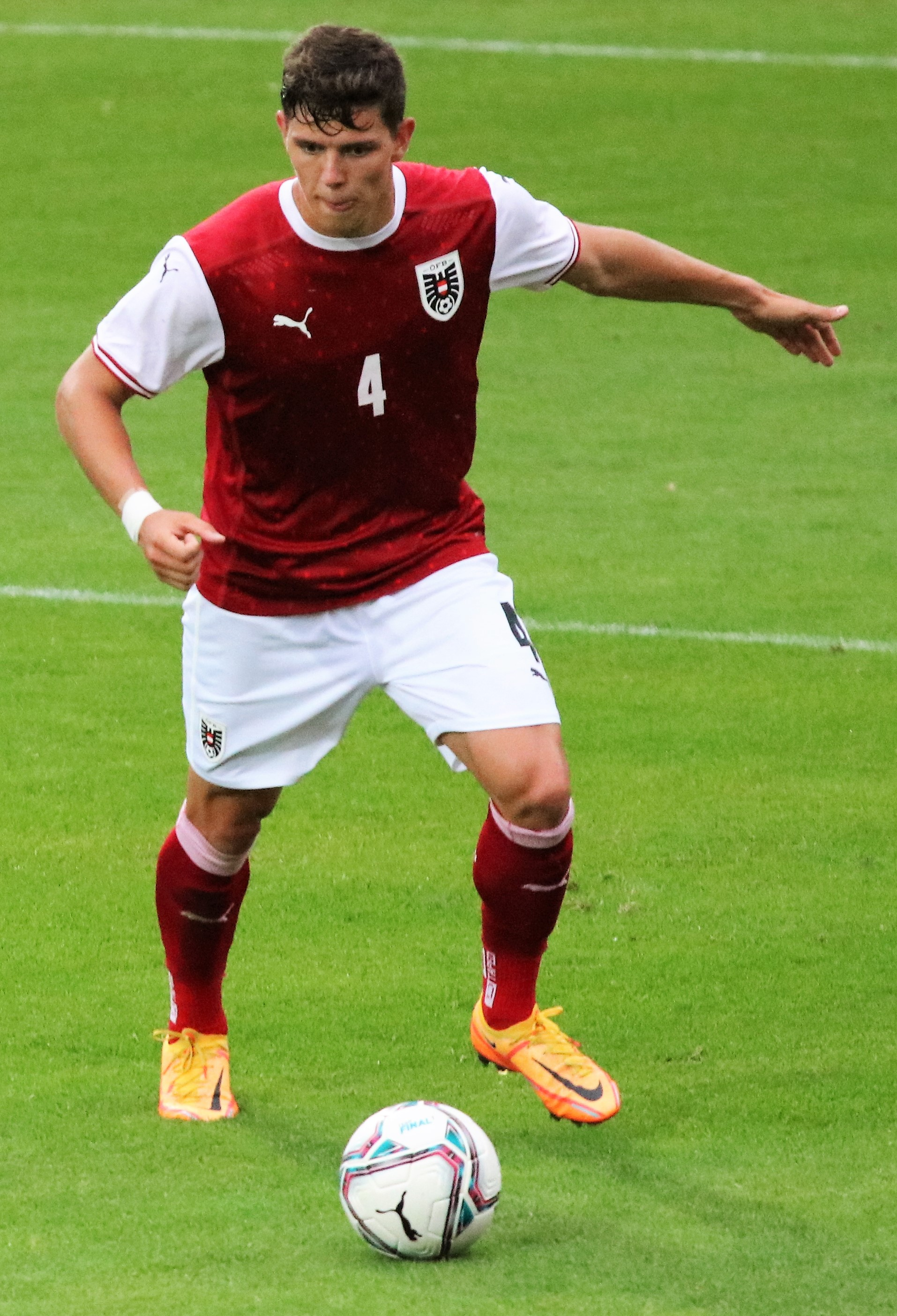
- Moormann in 2022

Personal information
- Date of birth: 30 April 2001 (age 25)
- Place of birth: Stockerau, Austria
- Height: 1.85 m (6 ft 1 in)
- Position: Centre-back

Team information
- Current team: Motherwell
- Number: 5

Youth career
- 2007–2013: Sierndorf
- 2013–2014: Horn
- 2014–2018: AKA St. Pölten

Senior career*
Years	Team	Apps	(Gls)
2018–2021	Rapid Wien II	41	(4)
2021–2024	Rapid Wien	50	(1)
2024–2026	Blau-Weiß Linz	41	(1)
2026–	Motherwell	2	(0)

International career^{‡}
2017	Austria U15	4	(0)
2017–2018	Austria U17	12	(1)
2021	Austria U18	4	(0)
2022	Austria U21	3	(0)
- * Club domestic league appearances and goals as of 21 August 2026 ‡ National team caps and goals as of 5 June 2022

Martin Moormann (born 30 April 2001) is an Austrian professional footballer who plays as a centre-back for Motherwell.

== Club career ==
Moormann is a youth product of Sierndorf, Horn and AKA St. Pölten, before moving to Rapid Wien in 2018. He began his professional career with their reserves, before debuting for their senior team in a 3–0 Austrian Cup win over Amstetten on 28 October 2021. He signed a professional contract with the club on 11 March 2022, keeping him at the club until June 2025.

On 3 July 2026, Scottish Premiership club Motherwell announced the signing of Moormann, on a contract until the summer of 2028.

== International career ==
Moormann is a youth international for Austria, having represented the Austria U15s, U17s, U18s, and U21s.

== Personal life ==
Moormann is a fan of the English football club Tottenham Hotspur.

== Career statistics ==
As of match played 20 August 2026

Appearances and goals by club, season and competition
Club	Season	League			National Cup (Note: Includes Austrian Cup and Scottish Cup)		League Cup (Note: Includes Scottish League Cup)		Continental		Other		Total	
Club	Season	Division	Apps	Goals	Apps	Goals	Apps	Goals	Apps	Goals	Apps	Goals	Apps	Goals
Rapid Wien II	2018–19	Austrian Regionalliga East	17	2	—		—		—		—		17	2
Rapid Wien II	2019–20	Austrian Regionalliga East	9	1	—		—		—		—		9	1
Rapid Wien II	2020–21	2. Liga	5	1	—		—		—		—		5	1
Rapid Wien II	2021–22	2. Liga	9	0	—		—		—		—		9	0
Rapid Wien II	2022–23	2. Liga	1	0	—		—		—		—		1	0
Rapid Wien II	Total		41	4	—		—		—		—		41	4
Rapid Wien	2021–22	Austrian Bundesliga	19	0	2	0	—		5 (Note: Three appearances in the UEFA Europa League and two appearances in the UEFA Europa Conference League)	0	—		26	0
Rapid Wien	2022–23	Austrian Bundesliga	21	0	3	0	—		2 (Note: Appearances in the UEFA Europa Conference League)	0	—		26	0
Rapid Wien	2023–24	Austrian Bundesliga	10	1	3	0	—		2	0	—		15	1
Rapid Wien	Total		50	1	8	0	—		9	0	—		67	1
Blau-Weiß Linz	2024–25	Austrian Bundesliga	22	0	1	0	—		—		—		23	0
Blau-Weiß Linz	2025–26	Austrian Bundesliga	19	1	3	2	—		—		—		22	3
Blau-Weiß Linz	Total		41	1	4	2	—		—		—		45	3
Motherwell	2026–27	Scottish Premiership	2	0	0	0	1	0	5	1	—		8	1
Career total			134	6	12	2	1	0	14	1	0	0	161	9
