= 1887–88 in Scottish football =

Football in Scotland
- Season: 1887–88

1887–88 in Scottish football

Scottish Cup winners
- Renton

Junior Cup winners
- Wishaw Thistle

Scotland national team
- 1888 BHC

The 1887–88 season was the 15th season of competitive football in Scotland. This season saw two further additions to the list of regional competitions with the inaugural playing of the Glasgow Cup and the Aberdeenshire Cup.

== Honours ==
=== Cup honours ===
==== National ====
Competition	Winner	Score	Runner-up
Scottish Cup	Renton	6 – 1	Cambuslang
Scottish Junior Cup	Wishaw Thistle	3 – 1 (Note: Replay needed.)	Maryhill

==== County ====
Competition	Winner	Score	Runner-up
Aberdeenshire Cup	Aberdeen	7 – 1	Aberdeen Rangers
Ayrshire Cup	Kilbirnie	4 – 3	Hurlford
Buteshire Cup	Bute Rangers	7 – 2	Millport Victoria
Dumbartonshire Cup	Vale of Leven	2 – 1	Renton
East of Scotland Shield	Mossend Swifts	1 – 0	Hibernian
Fife Cup	Lassodie	6 – 1	Burntisland Thistle
Forfarshire Cup	Arbroath	10 – 2	Dundee Strathmore
Glasgow Cup	Cambuslang	3 – 1	Rangers
Lanarkshire Cup	Airdrie	2 – 0	Motherwell
Linlithgowshire Cup	Bo'ness	4 – 3	Erin Rovers
Perthshire Cup	Dunblane	7 – 3	Fair City Athletic
Renfrewshire Cup	St Mirren	4 – 1	Abercorn
Stirlingshire Cup	East Stirlingshire	9 – 0	Falkirk

== Scotland national team ==
Date	Venue	Opponents	Score (Note: Scotland's score is shown first.)
10 March 1888	Easter Road, Edinburgh	Wales	5 – 1
17 March 1888	Hampden Park, Glasgow	England	0 – 5
24 March 1888	Cliftonville Cricket Ground, Belfast	Ireland	10 – 2

Team	Pld	W	D	L	GF	GA	GD	Pts
England (C)	3	3	0	0	15	2	+13	6
Scotland	3	2	0	1	15	8	+7	4
Wales	3	1	0	2	13	10	+3	2
Ireland	3	0	0	3	3	26	−23	0

Rules for classification: 1) Points. The points system worked as follows: 2 points for a win and 1 point for a draw.
(C) Champions
