= Willy Vogt =

Swiss footballer (born 2006)

Personal information
- Full name: Willy Gabriel Vogt Veigantes
- Date of birth: 1 June 2002 (age 24)
- Place of birth: Guarapuava, Brazil
- Height: 1.81 m (5 ft 11 in)
- Positions: Winger; forward

Team information
- Current team: Motherwell
- Number: 77

Youth career
- –2021: GC

Senior career*
Years	Team	Apps	(Gls)
2021	FC Basel U21	12	(1)
2022	Winterthur U21	12	(7)
2022–2025	FC Schaffhausen	60	(9)
2025–2026	Bellinzona	30	(11)
2026–	Motherwell	5	(0)

International career^{‡}
2017	Switzerland U16	3	(1)
2019	Switzerland U18	2	(1)
- * Club domestic league appearances and goals as of 30 September 2026 ‡ National team caps and goals as of 10 October 2019

Willy Gabriel Vogt Veigantes (born 1 June 2002) is a professional footballer who plays as a winger or forward for Motherwell. Born in Brazil, he has represented Switzerland at youth level.

== Early life ==
Vogt was born on 1 June 2002 in Guarapuava, Brazil. The nephew of Brazilian footballer Paulo Vogt, he grew up in Freienbach, Switzerland. Growing up, he started playing football at the age of six.

== Club career ==
As a youth player, Vogt joined the youth academy of Swiss side GC. In the summer of 2021, he signed for FC Basel U21, where he made twelve league appearances and scored one goal before joining Winterthur U21 in 2022, where he made twelve league appearances and scored seven goals.

That same year, he joined FC Schaffhausen, where he made sixty league appearances and scored nine goals, suffering relegation from the Swiss Challenge League. He subsequently signed for Bellinzona in 2025, where he made thirty league appearances and scored eleven goals, getting relegated from the Challenge League again. Ahead of the 2026–27 season, he signed for Scottish side Motherwell, where he played in the UEFA Conference League.

== International career ==
Vogt is a Switzerland youth international and has represented the country internationally at under-16 and under-18 level and is eligible to represent Brazil internationally.

On 19 September 2017, he made his debut for the Swiss under-16 national team during a 2–0 friendly win against Italy. Two days later, he scored his first goal for the under-16s in a 1–1 draw with Italy. In total, he made three appearances at under-16 level, scoring once.

On 8 October 2019, he made his debut for the Swiss under-18 national team, where he scored in a 2–2 draw against Denmark.
