= Alex Lowry =

Scottish professional footballer

Personal information
- Full name: Alexander Edward Lowry
- Date of birth: 23 June 2003 (age 23)
- Place of birth: Uddingston, Scotland
- Height: 1.80 m (5 ft 11 in)
- Positions: Attacking midfielder; left midfielder

Team information
- Current team: Motherwell (on loan from Wycombe Wanderers)
- Number: 11

Youth career
- Calderbraes
- –2022: Rangers

Senior career*
Years	Team	Apps	(Gls)
2022–2025	Rangers	9	(1)
2023–2024	→ Heart of Midlothian (loan)	12	(0)
2025–	Wycombe Wanderers	24	(1)
2026–	→ Motherwell (loan)	7	(2)

International career^{‡}
2018–2019	Scotland U16	3	(0)
2021–2022	Scotland U19	5	(4)
2022–2023	Scotland U21	2	(1)
- * Club domestic league appearances and goals as of 03:12, 20 March 2025 (UTC) ‡ National team caps and goals as of 13:10, 27 October 2023 (UTC)

Alexander Edward Lowry (born 23 June 2003) is a Scottish professional footballer who plays as an attacking midfielder or left midfielder for Motherwell, on loan from Wycombe Wanderers.

== Club career ==
Lowry is a product of the Rangers youth system, having joined the club as a ten year old. He played in the junior and B team and signed a contract with the club until the summer of 2023.

Lowry made his first-team debut for Rangers on 21 January 2022, in a Scottish Cup match against Stirling Albion, coming on as a first half substitute for Ianis Hagi. He also scored the opening goal of the match in the 31st minute. Lowry then started the following match for Rangers, a Scottish Premiership tie against Livingston, playing the full match in midfield. In May 2022, he signed a new contract with Rangers that is due to run until 2025.

Lowry joined Heart of Midlothian on loan on 4 August 2023. The deal was due to run until the end of the 2023–24 season, but Hearts cut it short during January 2024.

On 21 January 2025, Lowry signed for League One club Wycombe Wanderers.

== International career ==
Lowry has played youth international football for Scotland at under-16, under-19 and under-21 levels. He received his first call-up to the Scotland under-21 squad in May 2022. He made his debut for the under-21 team in November 2022, in a friendly against Iceland at Fir Park.

== Career statistics ==
As of match played 4 March 2025

Appearances and goals by club, season and competition
Club	Season	League			National cup (Note: Includes Scottish Cup, FA Cup)		League cup (Note: Includes Scottish League Cup)		Europe		Other		Total	
Club	Season	Division	Apps	Goals	Apps	Goals	Apps	Goals	Apps	Goals	Apps	Goals	Apps	Goals
Rangers B	2019–20	—	—		—		—		—		1 (Note: Appearance(s) in Scottish Challenge Cup)	0	1	0
Rangers B	2021–22	—	—		—		—		—		3	1	3	1
Rangers B	2022–23	—	—		—		—		—		3	4	3	4
Rangers B	2023–24	—	—		—		—		—		3	2	3	2
Rangers B	Total		—		—		—		—		10	7	10	7
Rangers	2021–22	Scottish Premiership	4	1	3	1	0	0	0	0	—		7	2
Rangers	2022–23	Scottish Premiership	5	0	1	0	0	0	1 (Note: Appearance in UEFA Champions League)	0	—		7	0
Rangers	Total		9	1	4	1	0	0	1	0	—		14	2
Heart of Midlothian (loan)	2023–24	Scottish Premiership	12	0	0	0	2	1	3 (Note: Appearances in UEFA Europa Conference League)	0	—		17	1
Wycombe Wanderers	2024–25	EFL League One	3	0	1	0	—		—		—		4	0
Career total			24	1	5	1	2	1	4	0	10	7	45	10

== Honours ==
Rangers

- Scottish Cup: 2021–22
