= Ibrahim Said (footballer, born 2002) =

Nigerian footballer (born 2002)

Personal information
- Full name: Ibrahim Muhammad Said
- Date of birth: 15 June 2002 (age 24)
- Place of birth: Kano, Nigeria
- Height: 1.73 m (5 ft 8 in)
- Position: Winger

Team information
- Current team: Motherwell
- Number: 19

Youth career
- Dabo Babes Academy
- 2020–2021: Viborg

Senior career*
| Years | Team | Apps | (Gls) |
| 2020–2025 | Viborg | 97 | (9) |
| 2025– | Motherwell | 41 | (4) |

International career
| 2019 | Nigeria U17 | 4 | (3) |
- * Club domestic league appearances and goals as of 00:29, 1 September 2026 (UTC)

Ibrahim Muhammad Said (born 15 June 2002) is a Nigerian professional footballer who plays as a winger for Scottish Premiership club Motherwell.

== Club career ==
=== Early years ===
A product of Dabo Babes Academy in Nigeria, Said gained international recognition following his strong performances at the 2019 FIFA U-17 World Cup.

=== Viborg ===
Despite receiving offers from other clubs, including Club Brugge and İstanbul Başakşehir, and reportedly from English clubs Liverpool and Manchester City, Said ultimately moved to Denmark. The 18-year-old, described by Nigerian media as the next Victor Moses, signed a four-year contract with Danish 1st Division club Viborg FF on 21 October 2021.

After a few matches with Viborg's under-19 team, Said made his official debut in the Danish 1st Division on 16 April 2021, in a 4–0 win against Esbjerg fB. He started on the bench before replacing Davit Skhirtladze in the 86th minute. Said made three appearances that season, scoring one goal and helping Viborg secure promotion to the Danish Superliga for the 2021–22 season. His debut in the Danish Superliga came against Nordsjælland on 18 July 2021.

Starting in the 2022–23 season, Said made regular appearances for Viborg. On 28 July 2022, in a 2022–23 UEFA Europa Conference League qualifying match against FK Sūduva, he scored in the opening minute as the only goal in a 1–0 victory for Viborg. One month later, both he and his Viborg teammate Alassana Jatta were unable to travel to England for the club's Europa Conference League play-off against West Ham United due to post-Brexit entry rules for non-EU citizens. Said finished the season with six goals from 41 appearances.

The following season saw fewer appearances for Said overall, and only three goals. Viborg head coach Jakob Poulsen did not include Said in a Superliga match versus Silkeborg on 4 August 2024 due to a violation of team rules, though Poulsen declined to elaborate further. By March 2025, Said was dropped from Viborg's lineup without explanation by the club. His final appearance for Viborg came on 24 February, in a 4–1 loss to Silkeborg. He finished the season with 16 appearances, unable to score any goals.

=== Motherwell ===
As Viborg began preparations for the 2025–26 season, Said was not included in the lineup for a friendly match versus FC Fredericia as he was allowed to pursue interest from other clubs. On 11 July 2025, his transfer to Scottish club Motherwell was announced by both clubs involved. He joined on a two-year contract, with an option for an additional year. On 30 December 2025, he scored his first goal for the club as Motherwell defeated Celtic 2–0.

== International career ==
In 2019, he participated in the FIFA U-17 World Cup for Nigeria, where he played all four matches, and made himself especially noticeable when he scored a hat-trick in the team's 3–2 victory over Ecuador.

== Career statistics ==
As of match played 30 August 2026

| Club | Season | League | | | National cup (Note: Appearances in the Danish Cup, Scottish Cup) | | League cup (Note: Appearances in the Scottish League Cup) | | Europe | | Other | | Total | |
| Club | Season | Division | Apps | Goals | Apps | Goals | Apps | Goals | Apps | Goals | Apps | Goals | Apps | Goals |
|---|---|---|---|---|---|---|---|---|---|---|---|---|---|---|
| Viborg | 2020–21 | Danish 1st Division | 3 | 1 | — | | — | | — | | — | | 3 | 1 |
| Viborg | 2021–22 | Danish Superliga | 19 | 1 | 1 | 0 | — | | — | | 1 (Note: Appearance in the 2021–22 Danish Superliga European play-offs) | 0 | 21 | 1 |
| Viborg | 2022–23 | Danish Superliga | 31 | 4 | 5 | 1 | — | | 5 (Note: Appearances in UEFA Europa Conference League/UEFA Conference League) | 1 | 0 | 0 | 41 | 6 |
| Viborg | 2023–24 | Danish Superliga | 29 | 3 | 2 | 0 | — | | — | | — | | 31 | 3 |
| Viborg | 2024–25 | Danish Superliga | 14 | 0 | 2 | 0 | — | | — | | — | | 16 | 0 |
| Viborg | Total | | 96 | 9 | 10 | 1 | — | — | 5 | 1 | 1 | 0 | 112 | 11 |
| Motherwell | 2025–26 | Scottish Premiership | 38 | 3 | 2 | 0 | 5 | 0 | — | | 0 | 0 | 45 | 3 |
| Motherwell | 2026–27 | Scottish Premiership | 3 | 1 | 2 | 0 | 1 | 0 | 5 | 2 | — | | 11 | 3 |
| Motherwell | Total | | 41 | 4 | 4 | 0 | 6 | 0 | 5 | 2 | 0 | 0 | 56 | 6 |
| Career total | | | 137 | 13 | 14 | 1 | 6 | 0 | 10 | 3 | 1 | 0 | 169 | 17 |

== Honours ==
Viborg

- Danish 1st Division: 2020–21
