= 2023–24 Motherwell F.C. season =

Motherwell
2023–24 season
- Chairman: James McMahon
- Manager: Stuart Kettlewell
- Stadium: Fir Park
- Premiership: 9th
- Scottish Cup: Fifth round vs Greenock Morton
- League Cup: Second round vs St Mirren
- Top goalscorer: League: Theo Bair (15); All: Theo Bair (15)
- Highest home attendance: 8,805 vs Rangers (24 December 2023)
- Lowest home attendance: 3,076 vs East Fife (29 July 2023)
- Average home league attendance: 5,699 (19 May 2024)
Home colours	Away colours

The 2023–24 season was Motherwell's thirty-ninth consecutive season in the top flight of Scottish football, having been promoted from the Scottish First Division at the end of the 1984–85 season.

== Season review ==
=== Preseason ===
On 26 May, Motherwell announced a week-long training camp in Delden, Netherlands.

On 31 May, Motherwell announced that Josh Morris had been released from his contract early, and that negotiations for new contracts where taking place with Jake Carroll, Logan Dunachie, Daniel Hunter, Kian Speirs, Jack Aitchison, Matthew Connelly, Max Johnston, Ewan Wilson, Dan Casey, Dean Cornelius, Sean Goss, Mikael Mandron, David Devine and Corey O’Donnell.

The draw for the 2023–24 Scottish League Cup took place on 8 June, drawing Motherwell at home to Queen's Park and East Fife, and away to Elgin City and Queen of the South.

On 21 June, Motherwell announced that Matthew Connelly and Ewan Wilson had signed new contracts with the club until the summer of 2024, whilst Sam Campbell had signed a short-term contract with the club. The following day, 22 June, Motherwell confirmed that Dean Cornelius had turned down a new contract with the club and signed for Harrogate Town, and that Harry Paton had signed a new two-year contract with the club.

==== Transfers ====
On 19 June, Motherwell announced the permanent signing of Jonathan Obika from Morecambe to a one-year contract with the option of a further year. The following day, 20 June, Motherwell announced that Kevin van Veen had left the club to join Groningen for an undisclosed fee.

On 4 July, Motherwell announced the signing of Conor Wilkinson to a two-year contract after his Walsall contract had ended the previous season.

On 11 July, Motherwell announced that Riku Danzaki had left the club.

On 14 July, Robbie Mahon joined Edinburgh City on a season-long loan deal and announced the return Dan Casey on a two-year contract.

On 15 July, Sam Campbell joined Annan Athletic on a six-month loan deal.

On 17 July, Motherwell announced the signing of free-agent Pape Souaré to a six-month contract.

On 21 July, Motherwell announced the signing of Davor Zdravkovski to a two-year contract from AEL Limassol.

On 24 July, Ross Tierney joined Walsall on a season-long loan deal.

On 26 July, Connor Shields left the club to join Indian Super League club Chennaiyin FC.

On 1 August, Motherwell announced the signing of free agent Theo Bair to a two-year contract.

On 3 August, Motherwell announced the season-long loan signing of Mika Biereth from Arsenal.

On 4 August, Adam MacDonald joined Cowdenbeath on loan for the season.

On 18 August, Barry Maguire joined Kidderminster Harriers on loan until January 2024.

On 24 August, Brodie Spencer joined Motherwell on a season-long loan deal from Huddersfield Town. The following day, 25 August, Robbie Garcia joined Cowdenbeath on loan until January, whilst Ricki Lamie joined Dundee on loan for the season on 26 August.

On 31 August, Motherwell announced the season-long loan signing of Oli Shaw from Barnsley. The following day, 1 September, Georgie Gent joined on a season-long loan from Blackburn Rovers.

=== September ===
On 11 September, Joseph Efford left the club after his contract was terminated by mutual agreement.

On 29 September, Mark Ferrie joined Stenhousemuir on loan until January 2024, whilst Ewan Wilson joined Stirling Albion on loan for the remainder of the season. The following day, 30 September, Nathan McGinley joined Partick Thistle on loan until January 2024.

=== November ===
On 15 November, Motherwell and Lennon Miller agreed to a one-year extension to his contract, that would see the midfielder stay with the club until the summer of 2026.

=== December ===
On 22 December, Motherwell announced that young goalkeeper Matthew Connelly had joined East Kilbride on loan for the remainder of the season.

=== January ===
==== Transfers ====
On 1 January, Motherwell announced that Pape Souaré had left the club after his contract had expired.

On 3 January, Huddersfield Town exercised a break clause in Brodie Spencer loan deal, ending the players time with Motherwell. Later the same day, Conor Wilkinson left the club for an undisclosed fee to join Colchester United.

On 4 January, Motherwell confirmed the departure of Sam Campbell from the club after his contract expired.

On 11 January, Arran Bone joined Lowland League club Gala Fairydean Rovers on loan for the remainder of the season, and Robbie Mahon joined Dundalk on a permanent deal.

On 15 January, Motherwell announced the signing of Adam Montgomery from Celtic on loan until the end of the season.

On 19 January, Motherwell announced the signing of Andy Halliday on loan from Heart of Midlothian until the end of the season, where the deal will then become a permanent one-year contract between the two.

On 22 January, Motherwell announced the signing of free-agent Callan Elliot on a contract until the end of the season. The following day, 23 January, Nathan McGinley departed the club by mutual consent and Sam Nicholson signed on a contract until the end of the season.

On 24 January, Motherwell announced that Oli Shaw had returned to Barnsley to continue his injury recovery at his parent club, ending his loan spell with the club.

On 31 January, Motherwell announced the loan signing of Jack Vale from Blackburn Rovers for the remainder of the season.

=== February ===
On 1 February, Adam Montgomery returned to Celtic after suffering a serious injury during a training session. Later the same day, Moterwell announced the loan signings until the end of the season of Adam Devine from Rangers and Jili Buyabu from Sheffield United.

On 8 February, Motherwell announced that Oli Shaw had returned to the club from Barnsley following a successful rehabilitation period with his parent club.

On 21 February, Jili Buyabu returned to his parent club Sheffield United for personal reasons.

On 22 February, Motherwell announced that they had extended the contract of Manager Stuart Kettlewell until May 2025.

On 23 February, Motherwell confirmed that defender Ricki Lamie had signed a pre-contract agreement with Dundee with whom he was currently on loan with, and would leave the club at the end of his contract.

=== March ===
On 5 March, Motherwell announced the signing of free-agent Moses Ebiye on a contract until the summer of 2025.

On 6 March, Ewan Wilson's loan to Stirling Albion was terminated and he joined Beith Juniors on loan for the remainder of the season.

=== April ===
On 12 April, Motherwell announced that they had extended their contract with Dylan Wells until the summer of 2026.

=== May ===
On 24 May, Motherwell announced their retained and released list, with Liam Kelly, Callan Elliot, Calum Butcher, Barry Maguire and Blair Spittal all leaving the club at the end of the season when their contracts expire, whilst Matthew Connelly, Stephen O'Donnell, Bevis Mugabi, Callum Slattery and Sam Nicholson had all been offered new contracts, with Paul McGinn and Aston Oxborough both extending their contracts until the summer of 2025. Meanwhile youth team players, Olly Whyte, Max Ross, Ewan Wilson and Mark Ferrie all extended their contract until the summer of 2025, whilst Shay Nevans, Robbie Garcia, Arran Bone, Kyle Aitken, Josh Bogan and Adam MacDonald would be leaving the club at the end of their contracts.

On 30 May, Jonathan Obika announced his retirement from football and joined the coaching staff at Motherwell.

On 31 May, Motherwell announced that they had signed Sam Nicholson to a permanent two-year contract, after joining the club on loan from Colorado Rapids in January 2024.

== Squad ==
As of match played 19 May 2024

No.	Name	Nationality	Position	Date of birth (age)	Signed from	Signed in	Contract ends	Apps.	Goals
Goalkeepers
1	Liam Kelly	(Scotland)	GK	23 January 1996 (aged 28)	Queens Park Rangers	2021	2024	154	0
13	Aston Oxborough	(England)	GK	9 May 1998 (aged 26)	Unattached	2022	2025	2	0
Defenders
2	Stephen O'Donnell	(Scotland)	DF	11 May 1992 (aged 32)	Kilmarnock	2020	2024	147	3
3	Georgie Gent	(England)	DF	23 September 2003 (aged 20)	on loan from Blackburn Rovers	2023	2024	31	2
5	Bevis Mugabi	(Uganda)	DF	1 May 1995 (aged 29)	Yeovil Town	2019	2024	125	7
15	Dan Casey	(Republic of Ireland)	DF	29 October 1997 (aged 26)	Unattached	2023	2025	44	3
16	Paul McGinn	(Scotland)	DF	22 October 1990 (aged 33)	Hibernian	2022	2025	80	1
20	Shane Blaney	(Republic of Ireland)	DF	20 January 1999 (aged 25)	Sligo Rovers	2022	2025	37	2
21	Adam Devine	(Scotland)	DF	25 March 2003 (aged 21)	on loan from Rangers	2024	2024	11	1
22	Adam Montgomery	(Scotland)	DF	18 July 2002 (aged 21)	on loan from Celtic	2024	2024	1	0
29	Callan Elliot	(New Zealand)	DF	7 July 1999 (aged 24)	Unattached	2024	2024	0	0
66	Calum Butcher	(England)	DF	26 February 1991 (aged 33)	Unattached	2023	2024	33	0
Midfielders
6	Barry Maguire	(Scotland)	MF	27 April 1998 (aged 26)	Academy	2015	2024	78	2
7	Blair Spittal	(Scotland)	MF	19 December 1995 (aged 28)	Ross County	2022	2024	86	19
8	Callum Slattery	(England)	MF	8 February 1999 (aged 25)	Southampton	2021	2024	94	9
11	Andy Halliday	(Scotland)	MF	11 October 1991 (aged 32)	on loan from Heart of Midlothian	2024	2024	14	1
12	Harry Paton	(Canada)	MF	23 May 1998 (aged 25)	Unattached	2023	2025	39	2
17	Davor Zdravkovski	(North Macedonia)	MF	20 March 1998 (aged 26)	Unattached	2023	2025	31	1
19	Sam Nicholson	(Scotland)	MF	20 January 1995 (aged 29)	on loan from Colorado Rapids	2024	2024	16	2
38	Lennon Miller	(Scotland)	MF	25 August 2006 (aged 17)	Academy	2022	2026	37	2
Forwards
9	Jonathan Obika	(England)	FW	12 September 1990 (aged 33)	Morecambe	2023	2024 (+1)	24	4
14	Theo Bair	(Canada)	FW	27 August 1999 (aged 24)	Unattached	2023	2025	41	15
18	Oli Shaw	(Scotland)	FW	12 February 1998 (aged 26)	on loan from Barnsley	2023	2024	19	0
24	Moses Ebiye	(Nigeria)	FW	28 April 1997 (aged 27)	Unattached	2024	2025	6	2
28	Jack Vale	(Wales)	FW	3 March 2001 (aged 23)	on loan from Blackburn Rovers	2024	2024	14	3
Development team
30	Mark Ferrie	(Scotland)	FW	2 December 2005 (aged 18)	Academy	2022	2025	10	0
33	Muhammad Adam	(Nigeria)	FW	27 February 2005 (aged 19)	Academy	2017	2024	0	0
35	Brannan McDermott	(Scotland)	DF	1 March 2006 (aged 18)	Academy	2022	2025	0	0
36	Robbie Garcia	(Scotland)	DF	28 April 2006 (aged 18)	Academy	2022	2024	0	0
37	Dylan Wells	(Scotland)	MF	20 March 2006 (aged 18)	Academy	2022	2026	2	0
39	Luca Ross	(Scotland)	FW	11 August 2006 (aged 17)	Academy	2022	2025	5	1
40	Shay Nevans	(Scotland)	FW	23 May 2006 (aged 17)	Academy	2022	2024	0	0
41	Josh Bogan	(Scotland)	GK	4 August 2006 (aged 17)	Academy	2022	2024	0	0
42	Max Ross	(Scotland)	DF	10 April 2006 (aged 18)	Academy	2022	2025	0	0
43	Olly Whyte	(Scotland)	MF	27 November 2006 (aged 17)	Academy	2023	2025	0	0
44	Zack Tomany	(Scotland)	FW		Academy	2023	2025	0	0
45	Campbell Forrest	(Scotland)	MF		Academy	2023	2025	0	0
46	Scott Williamson	(Scotland)	DF		Academy	2023	2025	0	0
47	Zack Flatman	(Scotland)	DF		Academy	2023	2025	0	0
48	Derin Marshall	(Scotland)	DF		Academy	2023	2025	0	0
49	Devon Johnston	(Scotland)	MF		Academy	2023	2025	0	0
50	Ross Nelson	(Scotland)	DF		Academy	2023	2025	0	0
51	Kyle Aitken	(Scotland)	GK	29 March 2005 (aged 19)	Academy	2023		0	0
52	Mikey Booth	(Scotland)	MF	2 January 2007 (aged 17)	Academy	2023	2025	0	0
U18
Away on loan
4	Ricki Lamie	(Scotland)	DF	20 June 1993 (aged 30)	Livingston	2020	2024	100	5
23	Ewan Wilson	(Scotland)	DF	19 November 2004 (aged 19)	Academy	2021	2025	2	0
26	Ross Tierney	(Republic of Ireland)	MF	6 March 2001 (aged 23)	Bohemians	2022	2025	38	4
31	Matthew Connelly	(Scotland)	GK	2 March 2003 (aged 21)	Academy	2019	2024	0	0
32	Adam MacDonald	(Scotland)	MF	26 July 2005 (aged 18)	Academy	2015	2024	0	0
34	Arran Bone	(Scotland)	DF	16 July 2006 (aged 17)	Academy	2022	2024	0	0
Left during the season
11	Joseph Efford	(United States)	FW	29 August 1996 (aged 27)	Waasland-Beveren	2022	2024	31	4
19	Nathan McGinley	(England)	DF	15 September 1996 (aged 27)	Forest Green Rovers	2020	2024	57	0
22	Brodie Spencer	(Northern Ireland)	DF	6 May 2004 (aged 20)	on loan from Huddersfield Town	2023	2024	18	0
24	Mika Biereth	(Denmark)	FW	8 February 2003 (aged 21)	on loan from Arsenal	2023	2024	15	6
25	Sam Campbell	(Scotland)	DF	13 April 2004 (aged 20)	Academy	2021	2023	0	0
27	Jili Buyabu	(England)	DF	9 August 2003 (aged 20)	on loan from Sheffield United	2024	2024	1	0
28	Robbie Mahon	(Republic of Ireland)	FW	6 June 2003 (aged 20)	Bohemians	2022		1	0
29	Connor Shields	(Scotland)	FW	29 July 1997 (aged 26)	Queen of the South	2021	2024	53	3
77	Pape Souaré	(Senegal)	DF	6 June 1990 (aged 33)	Unattached	2023	2024	6	0
99	Conor Wilkinson	(Republic of Ireland)	FW	23 January 1995 (aged 29)	Unattached	2023	2025	19	4

== Transfers ==
=== In ===
Date	Position	Nationality	Name	From	Fee	Ref
19 June 2023	FW	(England)	Jonathan Obika	Morecambe	Undisclosed	
4 July 2023	FW	(Republic of Ireland)	Conor Wilkinson	Unattached	Free	
17 July 2023	DF	(Senegal)	Pape Souaré	Unattached	Free	
21 July 2023	MF	(North Macedonia)	Davor Zdravkovski	Unattached	Free	
1 August 2023	FW	(Canada)	Theo Bair	Unattached	Free	
22 January 2024	DF	(New Zealand)	Callan Elliot	Unattached	Free	
5 March 2024	FW	(Nigeria)	Moses Ebiye	Unattached	Free	

=== Loans in ===
Date from	Position	Nationality	Name	From	Date to	Ref.
3 August 2023	FW	(Denmark)	Mika Biereth	Arsenal	18 January 2024	
24 August 2023	DF	(Northern Ireland)	Brodie Spencer	Huddersfield Town	3 January 2024	
31 August 2023	FW	(Scotland)	Oli Shaw	Barnsley	End of season	
1 September 2023	DF	(England)	Georgie Gent	Blackburn Rovers	End of season	
15 January 2024	DF	(Scotland)	Adam Montgomery	Celtic	End of season	
19 January 2024	MF	(Scotland)	Andy Halliday	Heart of Midlothian	End of season	
23 January 2024	MF	(Scotland)	Sam Nicholson	Colorado Rapids	End of season	
31 January 2024	FW	(Wales)	Jack Vale	Blackburn Rovers	End of season	
1 February 2024	DF	(Scotland)	Adam Devine	Rangers	End of season	
1 February 2024	DF	(England)	Jili Buyabu	Sheffield United	21 February 2024	

=== Out ===
Date	Position	Nationality	Name	To	Fee	Ref.
20 June 2023	FW	(Netherlands)	Kevin van Veen	Groningen	Undisclosed	
26 July 2023	FW	(Scotland)	Connor Shields	Chennaiyin FC	Undisclosed	
3 January 2024	FW	(Republic of Ireland)	Conor Wilkinson	Colchester United	Undisclosed	
11 January 2024	FW	(Republic of Ireland)	Robbie Mahon	Dundalk	Undisclosed	

=== Loans out ===
Date from	Position	Nationality	Name	To	Date to	Ref.
14 July 2023	FW	(Republic of Ireland)	Robbie Mahon	Edinburgh City	4 January 2024	
15 July 2023	DF	(Scotland)	Sam Campbell	Annan Athletic	4 January 2024	
24 July 2023	MF	(Republic of Ireland)	Ross Tierney	Walsall	31 May 2024	
4 August 2023	MF	(Scotland)	Adam MacDonald	Cowdenbeath	31 January 2024	
18 August 2023	MF	(Scotland)	Barry Maguire	Kidderminster Harriers	9 January 2024	
25 August 2023	DF	(Scotland)	Robbie Garcia	Cowdenbeath	4 January 2024	
26 August 2023	DF	(Scotland)	Ricki Lamie	Dundee	31 May 2024	
29 September 2023	FW	(Scotland)	Mark Ferrie	Stenhousemuir	7 January 2024	
29 September 2023	DF	(Scotland)	Ewan Wilson	Stirling Albion	6 March 2024	
30 September 2023	DF	(England)	Nathan McGinley	Partick Thistle	1 January 2024	
22 December 2023	GK	(Scotland)	Matthew Connelly	East Kilbride	31 May 2024	
11 January 2024	DF	(Scotland)	Arran Bone	Gala Fairydean Rovers	31 May 2024	
6 March 2024	DF	(Scotland)	Ewan Wilson	Beith Juniors	31 May 2024	

=== Released ===
Date	Position	Nationality	Name	Joined	Date	Ref.
11 July 2023	FW	(Japan)	Riku Danzaki	Western United	24 July 2023	
11 September 2023	FW	(United States)	Joseph Efford	PAS Giannina	16 September 2023	
1 January 2024	DF	(Senegal)	Pape Souaré	AFC Croydon Athletic	31 August 2024	
4 January 2024	DF	(Scotland)	Sam Campbell	East Stirlingshire	12 February 2024	
23 January 2024	DF	(England)	Nathan McGinley	Ayr United	1 March 2024	
30 May 2024	FW	(England)	Jonathan Obika	Retirement		
31 May 2024	GK	(Scotland)	Kyle Aitken			
31 May 2024	GK	(Scotland)	Josh Bogan	Neosho Panthers	16 July 2024	
31 May 2024	GK	(Scotland)	Matthew Connelly	Re-signed	12 July 2024	
31 May 2024	GK	(Scotland)	Liam Kelly	Rangers	27 June 2024	
31 May 2024	DF	(England)	Calum Butcher			
31 May 2024	DF	(New Zealand)	Callan Elliot	Auckland FC	2 July 2024	
31 May 2024	DF	(Scotland)	Arran Bone	Civil Service Strollers	26 July 2024	
31 May 2024	DF	(Scotland)	Robbie Garcia	Caledonian Locomotives	3 September 2024	
31 May 2024	DF	(Scotland)	Ricki Lamie	Ross County	1 July 2024	
31 May 2024	DF	(Uganda)	Bevis Mugabi	Anorthosis Famagusta	29 July 2024	
31 May 2024	MF	(England)	Callum Slattery	Re-signed	20 June 2024	
31 May 2024	MF	(Scotland)	Adam MacDonald	East Kilbride	26 July 2024	
31 May 2024	MF	(Scotland)	Barry Maguire	Hamilton Academical	12 June 2024	
31 May 2024	MF	(Scotland)	Blair Spittal	Heart of Midlothian	1 June 2024	
31 May 2024	FW	(Scotland)	Shay Nevans	Alloa Athletic	15 July 2024	

=== Trial ===
Date from	Position	Nationality	Name	Last club	Date to	Ref.
26 June 2023	FW	(England)	Josh Fowler	Beith Juniors		

== Friendlies ==
27 June 2023	HSC '21	0–1	Motherwell	Borculo, Netherlands
18:30 BST (UTC+1)		Report	Schrijver 45' (o.g.)	Stadium: Sportpark de Wildbaan

30 June 2023	Longa '30	0–6	Motherwell	Harreveld, Netherlands
18:00 BST (UTC+1)		Report	Ferrie 5', 50'; Spittal 24', 38'; Slattery 58'; Tierney 74'	Stadium: HMC ’17

8 July 2023	Motherwell	2–2	Falkirk	Dalziel Park
BST (UTC+1)	Spittal 20'; Slattery 63'	Report	Oliver 2'; MacIver 77'; Miller (penalty missed) 87'	Stadium: Dalziel Park; Attendance: Behind-closed-doors

11 July 2023	Dundee United	0–1	Motherwell	Dundee
BST (UTC+1)		Report	Wilkinson	Stadium: Tannadice Park; Attendance: Behind-closed-doors

== Competitions ==
=== Overview ===
Competition	First match	Last match	Starting round	Final position	Record							
Competition	First match	Last match	Starting round	Final position	Pld	W	D	L	GF	GA	GD	Win %
Premiership	5 August 2023	19 May 2024	Matchday 1	9th	38	10	13	15	56	59	−3	26.32
Scottish Cup	20 January 2024	9 February 2024	Fourth round	Fifth round	2	1	0	1	3	3	+0	50.00
League Cup	15 July 2023	19 August 2023	Group Stage	Second Round	5	3	1	1	9	4	+5	60.00
Total					45	14	14	17	68	66	+2	31.11

Last updated: 19 May 2024
Source: Soccerway

=== Premiership ===
==== League table ====
Pos	Team	Pld	W	D	L	GF	GA	GD	Pts	Qualification or relegation (Note: Teams play each other three times (33 matches), before the league is split into two groups (the top six and the bottom six).)
7	Aberdeen	38	12	12	14	48	52	−4	48	
8	Hibernian	38	11	13	14	52	59	−7	46	
9	Motherwell	38	10	13	15	56	59	−3	43	
10	St Johnstone	38	8	11	19	29	54	−25	35	
11	Ross County (O)	38	8	11	19	38	67	−29	35	Qualification for the Premiership play-off final

Rules for classification: 1) Points; 2) Goal difference; 3) Goals scored; 4) Head-to-Head points; 5) Head-to-Head goal difference; 6) Play-off (only if deciding champion, UEFA competitions qualification, second stage group allocation or relegation).
(O) Play-off winners

==== Results summary ====
Overall								Home						Away					
Pld	W	D	L	GF	GA	GD	Pts	W	D	L	GF	GA	GD	W	D	L	GF	GA	GD
38	10	13	15	56	59	−3	43	5	6	8	32	31	+1	5	7	7	24	28	−4

Last updated: 19 May 2024.
Source: SPFL

==== Results ====
5 August 2023 1	Dundee	1–1	Motherwell	Dundee
15:00 BST (UTC+1)	Cameron 68'	Report	Bair 45'; Souaré (yellow card) 72'; McGinley (yellow card) 79'	Stadium: Dens Park; Attendance: 6,391; Referee: David Dickinson

13 August 2023 2	Motherwell	2–1	Hibernian	Motherwell
15:00 BST (UTC+1)	Wilkinson 66'; Biereth 85'; Spittal (yellow card) 90+6'	Report	Miller (yellow card) 37'; Jeggo (yellow card) 60'; Newell (yellow card) 68'; Boyle (yellow card) 88'; Le Fondre 90+3' (pen.)	Stadium: Fir Park; Attendance: 6,262; Referee: Matthew MacDermid

26 August 2023 3	Motherwell	2–1	Kilmarnock	Motherwell
15:00 BST (UTC+1)	O'Donnell (yellow card) 43'; Spencer (yellow card) 52'; Slattery (yellow card) 57' (penalty missed) 78'; Casey 59' (yellow card) 71'; Paton (yellow card) 66' (goal) 90+8'; McGinn (yellow card) 90+2'	Report	Watkins 12' (yellow card) 32'; Deas (yellow card) 66'; Watson (yellow card) 73'	Stadium: Fir Park; Attendance: 5,758; Referee: Chris Graham

3 September 2023 4	Heart of Midlothian	0–1	Motherwell	Edinburgh
15:00 BST (UTC+1)	Devlin (yellow card) 71'	Report	Slattery 30'; McGinn (yellow card) 36' (yellow-red card) 68'; Casey (yellow card) 71'; Shaw (yellow card) 90'	Stadium: Tynecastle Park; Attendance: 18,353; Referee: Grant Irvine

16 September 2023 5	Motherwell	0–1	St Mirren	Motherwell
15:00 BST (UTC+1)		Report	Fraser (yellow card) 20'; Taylor (yellow card) 43'; Tanser 55'; Baccus (yellow card) 63'; Strain (yellow card) 65'; Hemming (yellow card) 82'	Stadium: Fir Park; Attendance: 5,653; Referee: Matthew MacDermid

24 September 2023 6	Rangers	1–0	Motherwell	Glasgow
15:00 BST (UTC+1)	Dessers 24'; Davies (yellow card) 90'; Rice (yellow card) 90+1'	Report	Casey (yellow card) 32'; Miller (yellow card) 58'	Stadium: Ibrox Stadium; Attendance: 48,539; Referee: Alan Muir

30 September 2023 7	Motherwell	1–2	Celtic	Motherwell
12:30 BST (UTC+1)	Slattery (yellow card) 10'; O'Donnell (yellow card) 54'; Spencer (yellow card) 90'; Spittal 90+5'	Report	Phillips (yellow card) 84'; Palma 87'; O'Riley 90+7'	Stadium: Fir Park; Attendance: 8,778; Referee: Willie Collum

7 October 2023 8	Livingston	2–0	Motherwell	Livingston
15:00 BST (UTC+1)	Anderson 53'; Kelly 62'; Holt (yellow card) 90+3'	Report	Miller (red card) 45+1'; Spencer (yellow card) 69'; Casey (yellow card) 90+3'; Wilkinson (yellow card) 90+4'	Stadium: Almondvale Stadium; Attendance: 2,039; Referee: Don Robertson

28 October 2023 10	Motherwell	3–3	Ross County	Motherwell
15:00 BST (UTC+1)	Spencer (yellow card) 70'; Biereth 79' (pen.); Slattery (yellow card) 85'; Wilkinson 88'; L.Ross 90+4'	Report	Allardice (yellow card) 32'; Loturi (yellow card) 33' (goal) 83'; Brophy 65'; Murray 73'	Stadium: Fir Park; Attendance: 5,119; Referee: Graham Grainger

1 November 2023 11	Motherwell	2–4	Aberdeen	Motherwell
19:45 GMT (UTC)	Butcher (yellow card) 51'; Wilkinson (yellow card) 52'; Spencer (yellow card) 54'; Biereth (yellow card) 59' (goal) 90+3'; Kelly (yellow card) 69'; Bair 78'; Zdravkovski (yellow card) 90+4'	Report	McGrath 26', 68'; Devlin 44'; Duk 74'; Roos (yellow card) 87'	Stadium: Fir Park; Attendance: 4,240; Referee: Colin Steven

4 November 2023 12	Kilmarnock	1–0	Motherwell	Kilmarnock
15:00 GMT (UTC)	Watson (yellow card) 38'; Cameron 49'; Lyons (yellow card) 90+5'	Report	Casey (yellow card) 32'	Stadium: Rugby Park; Attendance: 5,553; Referee: Matthew MacDermid

7 November 2023 9	St Johnstone	2–2	Motherwell	Perth
19:45 GMT (UTC)	Clark 17'; Considine 27'; Phillips (yellow card) 43'	Report	Slattery (yellow card) 37'; Paton (yellow card) 47'; Blaney 68'; Biereth 74'	Stadium: McDiarmid Park; Attendance: 3,513; Referee: Euan Anderson
Note: Match original scheduled for 21 October, but postponed on 20 October due to a Red Weather warning for Storm Babet.

11 November 2023 13	Motherwell	1–2	Heart of Midlothian	Motherwell
15:00 GMT (UTC)	Paton (yellow card) 40'; Slattery (yellow card) 62'; Spittal 78' (pen.); Butcher (yellow card) 80'; Gent (yellow card) 89'	Report	Shankland 27', 71'; Sibbick (yellow card) 86'; Baningime (yellow card) 89'	Stadium: Fir Park; Attendance: 5,884; Referee: David Munro

25 November 2023 14	Celtic	1–1	Motherwell	Glasgow
15:00 GMT (UTC)	Palma (penalty missed) 66'; Taylor (yellow card) 70'; Turnbull 86' (pen.)	Report	Slattery (yellow card) 14'; O'Donnell (yellow card) 41'; Mugabi (yellow card) 64'; Butcher (yellow card) 85'; Obika 90'	Stadium: Celtic Park; Attendance: 58,140; Referee: Steven McLean

2 December 2023 15	Motherwell	3–3	Dundee	Motherwell
15:00 GMT (UTC)	Biereth 6'; Butcher (yellow card) 44'; Casey (yellow card) 49'; Mugabi 68'; Paton (red card) 72'; Wilkinson (yellow card) 90+5' (goal) 90+7'	Report	Cameron 30'; Beck 34'; Boateng (yellow card) 80'; Robinson 88'; McCowan (yellow card) 90+7'	Stadium: Fir Park; Attendance: 4,239; Referee: Iain Snedden

5 December 2023 16	Ross County	3–0	Motherwell	Dingwall
19:45 GMT (UTC)	Murray 2'; Dhanda 18'; White (yellow card) 43'; Purrington 56'; Nightingale (yellow card) 88' (yellow-red card) 90+2'	Report	Spittal (yellow card) 20'; Gent (yellow card) 69'	Stadium: Victoria Park; Attendance: 2,835; Referee: David Dickinson

9 December 2023 17	Motherwell	1–1	St Johnstone	Motherwell
15:00 GMT (UTC)	Biereth 90+2'	Report	Mugabi 53' (o.g.)	Stadium: Fir Park; Attendance: 3,647; Referee: Euan Anderson

16 December 2023 18	St Mirren	0–0	Motherwell	Paisley
15:00 GMT (UTC)	O'Hara (penalty missed) 50'; Baccus (yellow card) 73'	Report	Spittal (yellow card) 40'	Stadium: St Mirren Park; Attendance: 5,837; Referee: Craig Napier

24 December 2023 19	Motherwell	0–2	Rangers	Motherwell
12:00 GMT (UTC)	Spencer (yellow card) 53'; O'Donnell (yellow card) 60'; Gent (yellow card) 65'	Report	Dowell 4'; Cantwell 16'; Sterling (yellow card) 88'	Stadium: Fir Park; Attendance: 8,805; Referee: David Dickinson

30 December 2023 21	Motherwell	3–1	Livingston	Motherwell
15:00 GMT (UTC)	Spittal 14'; Bair 19', 35'; Biereth (yellow card) 45'; Spencer (yellow card) 59'; Mugabi (yellow card) 71'; Slattery (yellow card) 84'	Report	Pittman 23'; Devlin (yellow card) 39'; Holt (yellow card) 43'; Anderson (yellow card) 83'	Stadium: Fir Park; Attendance: 4,076; Referee: Chris Graham

2 January 2024 22	Hibernian	2–2	Motherwell	Edinburgh
15:00 GMT (UTC)	Youan 28', 90+1'; Levitt (yellow card) 61'; Newell (yellow card) 88'	Report	Bair 35'; Gent (yellow card) 48'; Mugabi 64'; Paton (yellow card) 88'	Stadium: Easter Road; Attendance: 16,796; Referee: Don Robertson

27 January 2024 23	St Johnstone	1–1	Motherwell	Perth
15:00 GMT (UTC)	McGowan 3'; C.Smith (yellow card) 76'; Phillips (yellow card) 90+2'	Report	Kelly (yellow card) 4'; Bair 29'; Zdravkovski (yellow card) 45'; Halliday (yellow card) 45+5'	Stadium: McDiarmid Park; Attendance: 3,412; Referee: Colin Steven

3 February 2024 24	Motherwell	1–1	Kilmarnock	Motherwell
15:00 GMT (UTC)	Bair 38'; Butcher (yellow card) 80'; Spittal (yellow card) 85'	Report	Mayo 13'; Wright (yellow card) 36'; Armstrong (yellow card) 48'; Stewart (yellow card) 80'; Findlay (yellow card) 85' van Veen (yellow card) 90+5'	Stadium: Fir Park; Attendance: 5,491; Referee: Don Robertson

6 February 2024 25	Motherwell	5–0	Ross County	Motherwell
19:45 GMT (UTC)	Halliday 8'; Spittal 21', 87'; Bair 36' (pen.); Butcher (yellow card) 65'; Miller (yellow card) 80'; Vale 90+1'	Report	Harmon (yellow card) 32'; Jenks (yellow card) 82'	Stadium: Fir Park; Attendance: 3,724; Referee: Matthew McDermid

14 February 2024 20	Aberdeen	3–3	Motherwell	Aberdeen
19:45 GMT (UTC)	Duk 31', 50'; Gartenmann 37'; MacDonald (yellow card) 83'; Shinnie (yellow card) 90'	Report	Bair 5' (pen.), 22'; Devine 26'; Nicholson (yellow card) 61'; McGinn (yellow card) 87'; Butcher (yellow card) 90+4'; Kelly (yellow card) 90+5'	Stadium: Pittodrie Stadium; Attendance: 15,290; Referee: Kevin Clancy
Note: Match was originally scheduled, and postponed, on 27 December 2023, due to travel disruption caused by Storm Gerrit.

17 February 2024 26	Heart of Midlothian	2–0	Motherwell	Edinburgh
15:00 GMT (UTC)	Shankland (yellow card) 23' (goal) 67'; Vargas 90+2'	Report	Zdravkovski (yellow card) 69'; Nicholson (yellow card) 88'	Stadium: Tynecastle Park; Attendance: 18,748; Referee: Chris Graham

25 February 2024 27	Motherwell	1–3	Celtic	Motherwell
12:00 GMT (UTC)	Spittal 43'; Butcher (yellow card) 79'	Report	Idah 51', 90+4'; Taylor (yellow card) 55'; Palma 90+7' (yellow card) 90+7'	Stadium: Fir Park; Attendance: 8,639; Referee: Willie Collum

28 February 2024 28	Livingston	1–3	Motherwell	Livingston
20:00 GMT (UTC)	Yengi 3' (yellow card) 90+5'	Report	Nicholson 49'; Spittal 71'; Casey (yellow card) 74'; Vale 87'	Stadium: Almondvale Stadium; Attendance: 1,659; Referee: John Beaton

2 March 2024 29	Rangers	1–2	Motherwell	Glasgow
15:00 GMT (UTC)	Tavernier 60' (pen.)	Report	Bair 9' (yellow card) 90+7'; O'Donnell (yellow card) 56'; Casey 75' (yellow card) 90+5'	Stadium: Ibrox Stadium; Attendance: 50,281; Referee: Alan Muir

16 March 2024 30	Motherwell	0–1	Aberdeen	Motherwell
15:00 GMT (UTC)	O'Donnell (yellow card) 85'	Report	Hoilett (yellow card) 1'; Clarkson 25'; Roos (yellow card) 90+2'	Stadium: Fir Park; Attendance: 5,659; Referee: Willie Collum

30 March 2024 31	Motherwell	1–1	St Mirren	Motherwell
15:00 GMT (UTC)	Vale (yellow card) 54'; Bair 74'	Report	Fraser 18'; Olusanya (yellow card) 39'	Stadium: Fir Park; Attendance: 5,492; Referee: Matthew MacDermid

6 April 2024 32	Dundee	2–3	Motherwell	Dundee
15:00 BST (UTC+1)	McGhee 36'; McCowan 70'; Bakayoko (yellow card) 74'; Mellon (yellow card) 82'	Report	Bair (penalty missed) 79' 81'; Gent 79'; Ebiye 90+3'	Stadium: Dens Park; Attendance: 5,924; Referee: David Dickinson

13 April 2024 33	Motherwell	1–1	Hibernian	Motherwell
15:00 BST (UTC+1)	Vale (yellow card) 45'; Spittal (yellow card) 56'; Blaney 90+4'	Report	Newell (yellow card) 15'; Moriah-Welsh (yellow card) 48'; Bushiri (yellow card) 55'; Boyle (yellow card) 56'; Maolida 65'	Stadium: Fir Park; Attendance: 7,083; Referee: Willie Collum

27 April 2024 34	Aberdeen	1–0	Motherwell	Aberdeen
15:00 BST (UTC+1)	Gartenmann (yellow card) 14' (goal) 60'	Report	Vale (red card) 56'	Stadium: Pittodrie Stadium; Attendance: 14,794; Referee: Craig Napier

4 May 2024 35	Motherwell	4–1	Livingston	Motherwell
15:00 BST (UTC+1)	Bair 21', 68'; Nicholson 68'; Miller (yellow card) 70'; Casey 74'; Zdravkovski (yellow card) 85'	Report	Nouble 77'	Stadium: Fir Park; Attendance: 4,161; Referee: David Munro

11 May 2024 36	Ross County	1–5	Motherwell	Dingwall
15:00 BST (UTC+1)	Murray 14'; Reid (yellow card) 45+2'; Ayina (yellow card) 47'; Baldwin (yellow card) 90+2'	Report	Spittal 8', 82'; McGinn 40'; Gent (yellow card) 57'; Zdravkovski (yellow card) 71' (goal) 90'; Paton 90+4'	Stadium: Victoria Park; Attendance: Kevin Clancy; Referee: 3,399

15 May 2024 37	Hibernian	3–0	Motherwell	Edinburgh
15:00 BST (UTC+1)	Stevenson (yellow card) 4'; Maolida 41'; Boyle 45', 55'	Report	Gent (yellow card) 28'	Stadium: Easter Road; Attendance: 15,451; Referee: Steven McLean

19 May 2024 38	Motherwell	1–2	St Johnstone	Motherwell
15:00 BST (UTC+1)	Bair (penalty missed) 32'; Ebiye 90+4'	Report	Clark 18'; Sidibeh 45+1'; Keltjens (yellow card) 52'	Stadium: Fir Park; Attendance: 5,571; Referee: Colin Steven

=== Scottish Cup ===
20 January 2024 Fourth round	Motherwell	3–1	Alloa Athletic	Motherwell
15:00 GMT (UTC)	Spittal 2', 88'; Gent 60'	Report	Sammon 27'; Neill (yellow card) 81'	Stadium: Fir Park; Attendance: 4,119; Referee: John Beaton

9 February 2024 Fifth round	Greenock Morton	2–1	Motherwell	Greenock
19:30 GMT (UTC)	Paton 36' (o.g.); Muirhead (yellow card) 37'; Strapp (yellow card) 47'; Oakley 55'; Power (yellow card) 67'	Report	Vale 85'; Mugabi (yellow card) 87'; Butcher (yellow card) 90+2'	Stadium: Cappielow; Referee: John Beaton

=== League Cup ===
==== Group stage ====
Pos	Team	Pld	W	PW	PL	L	GF	GA	GD	Pts	Qualification	MOT	QOS	EFI	QPA	ELG
1	Motherwell	4	3	1	0	0	9	3	+6	11	Qualification for the second round	—	—	3–0	1–0	—
2	Queen of the South	4	2	0	2	0	7	4	+3	8		3–3p	—	0–0p	—	—
3	East Fife	4	1	2	0	1	3	4	−1	7		—	—	—	p0–0	3–1
4	Queen's Park	4	1	0	1	2	6	3	+3	4		—	1–2	—	—	5–0
5	Elgin City	4	0	0	0	4	1	12	−11	0		0–2	0–2	—	—	—

Rules for classification: 1) goal difference, 2) goals scored, 3) away goals scored, 4) matches won, 5) away matches won, 6) drawing of lots.

15 July 2023 1	Elgin City	0–2	Motherwell	Elgin
15:00 BST (UTC+1)	Cameron (yellow card) 57'	Report	Miller 25' (yellow card) 68'; Obika 76'	Stadium: Borough Briggs; Attendance: 2,026; Referee: Iain Snedden

18 July 2023 2	Queen of the South	3–3 (4 – 5 p)	Motherwell	Dumfries
19:45 BST (UTC+1)	McKechnie 18'; Cochrane (yellow card) 33'; Reilly 73', 83' (pen.); (yellow card) 86'	Report	Spittal 40', 75'; Slattery 56'; Lamie (yellow card) 84' (yellow-red card) 90'; Wilkinson 88'	Stadium: Palmerston Park; Attendance: 1,756; Referee: Craig Napier
	Penalties
	Reilly (penalty scored); Mimnaugh (penalty scored); McKay (penalty scored); Todd (penalty scored); McKechnie (penalty missed)		Spittal (penalty scored); Wilkinson (penalty scored); Slattery (penalty scored); McGinn (penalty scored); O'Donnell (penalty scored)

22 July 2023 3	Motherwell	1–0	Queen's Park	Motherwell
17:15 BST (UTC+1)	Obika 29'; O'Donnell (yellow card) 73'	Report	Jarrett (yellow card) 60'	Stadium: Fir Park; Attendance: 3,161; Referee: Steven McLean

29 July 2023 4	Motherwell	3–0	East Fife	Motherwell
15:00 BST (UTC+1)	Miller 32'; McGinn (yellow card) 32'; Wilkinson 36' (yellow card) 62'; Slattery 66'; Mugabi (yellow card) 71'	Report	Walls (yellow card) 33'; Page (red card) 43'	Stadium: Fir Park; Attendance: 3,076; Referee: Kevin Clancy

==== Knockout stage ====
19 August 2023 Second Round	St Mirren	1–0	Motherwell	Paisley
15:00 BST (UTC+1)	Boyd-Munce 9'; Mandron (yellow card) 80'; Dunne (yellow card) 90+3'	Report	O'Donnell (yellow card) 53'; Mugabi (yellow card) 89'; McGinn (yellow card) 90+3'	Stadium: St Mirren Park; Attendance: 5,241; Referee: Willie Collum

== Squad statistics ==
=== Appearances ===
As of match played 19 May 2024

No.	Pos	Nat	Player	Total		Premiership		Scottish Cup		League Cup	
No.	Pos	Nat	Player	Apps	Goals	Apps	Goals	Apps	Goals	Apps	Goals
1	GK	(Scotland) SCO	Liam Kelly	43	0	38	0	2	0	3	0
2	DF	(Scotland) SCO	Stephen O'Donnell	44	0	32+5	0	2	0	4+1	0
3	DF	(England) ENG	Georgie Gent	31	2	19+10	1	2	1	0	0
5	DF	(Uganda) UGA	Bevis Mugabi	38	2	27+5	2	2	0	4	0
6	MF	(Scotland) SCO	Barry Maguire	3	0	0	0	0	0	0+3	0
7	MF	(Scotland) SCO	Blair Spittal	44	13	37	9	2	2	5	2
8	MF	(England) ENG	Callum Slattery	25	3	18+2	1	0	0	5	2
9	FW	(England) ENG	Jonathan Obika	14	3	2+8	1	0+1	0	3	2
11	MF	(Scotland) SCO	Andy Halliday	14	1	8+4	1	0+2	0	0	0
12	MF	(Canada) CAN	Harry Paton	32	2	21+5	2	2	0	1+3	0
13	GK	(England) ENG	Aston Oxborough	2	0	0	0	0	0	2	0
14	FW	(Canada) CAN	Theo Bair	41	15	31+7	15	2	0	1	0
15	DF	(Republic of Ireland) IRL	Dan Casey	31	3	28	3	0	0	3	0
16	DF	(Scotland) SCO	Paul McGinn	38	1	29+2	1	2	0	4+1	0
17	MF	(North Macedonia) MKD	Davor Zdravkovski	31	1	18+9	1	2	0	1+1	0
18	FW	(Scotland) SCO	Oli Shaw	19	0	2+17	0	0	0	0	0
19	MF	(Scotland) SCO	Sam Nicholson	16	2	6+10	2	0	0	0	0
20	DF	(Republic of Ireland) IRL	Shane Blaney	28	2	20+4	2	0	0	4	0
21	DF	(Scotland) SCO	Adam Devine	11	1	6+4	1	0+1	0	0	0
22	DF	(Scotland) SCO	Adam Montgomery	1	0	0	0	1	0	0	0
24	FW	(Nigeria) NGR	Moses Ebiye	6	2	0+6	2	0	0	0	0
28	FW	(Wales) WAL	Jack Vale	14	3	9+4	2	0+1	1	0	0
30	FW	(Scotland) SCO	Mark Ferrie	10	0	0+5	0	0	0	1+4	0
37	MF	(Scotland) SCO	Dylan Wells	2	0	0+1	0	0+1	0	0	0
38	MF	(Scotland) SCO	Lennon Miller	32	2	20+5	0	1+1	0	4+1	2
39	FW	(Scotland) SCO	Luca Ross	4	1	0+3	1	0	0	1	0
66	DF	(England) ENG	Calum Butcher	19	0	9+8	0	2	0	0	0
Players away from the club on loan:
4	DF	(Scotland) SCO	Ricki Lamie	1	0	0	0	0	0	1	0
23	DF	(Scotland) SCO	Ewan Wilson	2	0	0	0	0	0	1+1	0
Players who left Motherwell during the season:
11	FW	(United States) USA	Joseph Efford	3	0	1+1	0	0	0	0+1	0
19	DF	(England) ENG	Nathan McGinley	4	0	0+2	0	0	0	0+2	0
22	DF	(Northern Ireland) NIR	Brodie Spencer	18	0	17+1	0	0	0	0	0
24	FW	(Denmark) DEN	Mika Biereth	15	6	11+3	6	0	0	0+1	0
27	DF	(England) ENG	Jili Buyabu	1	0	0	0	0+1	0	0	0
77	DF	(Senegal) SEN	Pape Souaré	6	0	2+1	0	0	0	3	0
99	FW	(Republic of Ireland) IRL	Conor Wilkinson	19	4	7+7	3	0	0	4+1	1

=== Goal scorers ===
As of match played 19 May 2024

Ranking	Nation	Position	Number	Name	Scottish Premiership	Scottish Cup	League Cup	Total
1	FW	(Canada)	14	Theo Bair	15	0	0	15
2	MF	(Scotland)	7	Blair Spittal	9	2	2	13
3	FW	(Denmark)	24	Mika Biereth	6	0	0	6
4	FW	(Republic of Ireland)	99	Conor Wilkinson	3	0	1	4
5	DF	(Republic of Ireland)	15	Dan Casey	3	0	0	3
5	MF	(England)	8	Callum Slattery	1	0	2	3
5	FW	(England)	9	Jonathan Obika	1	0	2	3
8	DF	(Uganda)	5	Bevis Mugabi	2	0	0	2
8	FW	(Wales)	28	Jack Vale	2	0	0	2
8	DF	(Republic of Ireland)	20	Shane Blaney	2	0	0	2
8	MF	(Scotland)	19	Sam Nicholson	2	0	0	2
8	MF	(Canada)	12	Harry Paton	2	0	0	2
8	FW	(Nigeria)	24	Moses Ebiye	2	0	0	2
8	DF	(England)	3	Georgie Gent	1	1	0	2
8	MF	(Scotland)	38	Lennon Miller	0	0	2	2
16	FW	(Scotland)	47	Luca Ross	1	0	0	1
16	MF	(Scotland)	11	Andy Halliday	1	0	0	1
16	DF	(Scotland)	21	Adam Devine	1	0	0	1
16	DF	(Scotland)	16	Paul McGinn	1	0	0	1
16	MF	(North Macedonia)	17	Davor Zdravkovski	1	0	0	1
TOTALS					56	3	9	68

=== Clean sheets ===
As of match played 19 May 2024

Ranking	Nation	Position	Number	Name	Scottish Premiership	Scottish Cup	League Cup	Total
1	GK	(Scotland)	1	Liam Kelly	3	0	2	5
2	GK	(England)	13	Aston Oxborough	0	0	1	1
TOTALS					3	0	3	6

=== Disciplinary record ===
As of match played 19 May 2024

Number	Nation	Position	Name	Premiership		Scottish Cup		League Cup		Total	
Number	Nation	Position	Name	Yellow card	Red card	Yellow card	Red card	Yellow card	Red card	Yellow card	Red card
1	(Scotland)	GK	Liam Kelly	3	0	0	0	0	0	3	0
2	(Scotland)	DF	Stephen O'Donnell	6	0	0	0	2	0	8	0
3	(England)	DF	Georgie Gent	5	0	0	0	0	0	5	0
5	(Uganda)	DF	Bevis Mugabi	2	0	1	0	2	0	5	0
7	(Scotland)	MF	Blair Spittal	5	0	0	0	0	0	5	0
8	(England)	MF	Callum Slattery	7	0	0	0	0	0	7	0
11	(Scotland)	MF	Andy Halliday	1	0	0	0	0	0	1	0
12	(Canada)	MF	Harry Paton	4	1	0	0	0	0	4	1
14	(Canada)	FW	Theo Bair	1	0	0	0	0	0	1	0
15	(Republic of Ireland)	DF	Dan Casey	8	0	0	0	0	0	8	0
16	(Scotland)	DF	Paul McGinn	4	1	0	0	2	0	6	1
17	(North Macedonia)	MF	Davor Zdravkovski	5	0	0	0	0	0	5	0
18	(Scotland)	FW	Oli Shaw	1	0	0	0	0	0	1	0
19	(Scotland)	MF	Sam Nicholson	2	0	0	0	0	0	2	0
20	(Republic of Ireland)	DF	Shane Blaney	1	0	0	0	0	0	1	0
28	(Wales)	FW	Jack Vale	2	1	0	0	0	0	2	1
38	(Scotland)	MF	Lennon Miller	3	1	0	0	1	0	4	1
66	(England)	DF	Calum Butcher	8	0	1	0	0	0	9	0
Players away from the club on loan::
4	(Scotland)	DF	Ricki Lamie	0	0	0	0	2	1	2	1
Players who left Motherwell during the season:
19	(England)	DF	Nathan McGinley	1	0	0	0	0	0	1	0
22	(Northern Ireland)	DF	Brodie Spencer	7	0	0	0	0	0	7	0
24	(Denmark)	FW	Mika Biereth	2	0	0	0	0	0	2	0
77	(Senegal)	DF	Pape Souaré	1	0	0	0	0	0	1	0
99	(Republic of Ireland)	FW	Conor Wilkinson	3	0	0	0	2	0	5	0
			TOTALS	82	4	2	0	11	1	95	5

== See also ==
- List of Motherwell F.C. seasons
