= 2022–23 St Johnstone F.C. season =

Football club season review

St Johnstone
2022–23 season
- Chairman: Steve Brown
- Manager: Callum Davidson (until 16 April); Steven MacLean (Interim from 16 April)
- Stadium: McDiarmid Park
- Premiership: Ninth Place
- League Cup: Group stage
- Scottish Cup: Fourth round
- Top goalscorer: League: Stevie May (9); All: Stevie May (10)
- Highest home attendance: 7,855 vs. Rangers, Scottish Cup, 21 February 2023
- Lowest home attendance: 2,036 vs. Annan Athletic, League Cup, 12 July 2022
- Average home league attendance: 5,323
Home colours	Away colours	Third colours

The 2022–23 season was St Johnstone's tenth season in the Scottish Premiership and their fourteenth consecutively (following four in the former Scottish Premier League) in the top flight of Scottish football. Saints were eliminated from the League Cup at the group stage. They also competed in the Scottish Cup.

== Season summary ==
Still managed by Callum Davidson, Saints hoped to improve upon their performance in the 2021–22 season when, after finishing eleventh, they had to win the Premiership playoff to avoid relegation. The team had been in transition since winning the Scottish Cup in May 2021 and Saints were again very active in the summer transfer window which closed on 31 August. The scale of transition is illustrated by the team which played St Mirren three days later on 3 September. Of the 20-man squad who contested the 2021 Scottish Cup Final just 15 months earlier, only nine players remained at the club in some capacity and only Stevie May was in the starting line-up for the St Mirren match with four others on the bench. Among the summer 2022 intake were Drey Wright and Jamie Murphy who had both played for Hibernian in the 2021 final.

== Competitions ==
Win Draw Loss Postponed

=== Scottish Premiership ===
30 July 2022 1	St Johnstone	0–1	Hibernian	Perth
15:00 BST		Report	MacPherson 90' (o.g.)	Stadium: McDiarmid Park; Attendance: 5,739; Referee: Euan Anderson

6 August 2022 2	Motherwell	1–2	St Johnstone	Motherwell
15:00 BST	Carey 91' (o.g.)	Report	Murphy 28'; May 94'	Stadium: Fir Park; Attendance: 4,711; Referee: William Collum

13 August 2022 3	Rangers	4–0	St Johnstone	Glasgow
15:00 BST	Tillman 32'; Colak 62'; Arfield 80'; Lawrence 83'	Report		Stadium: Ibrox Stadium; Attendance: 48,665; Referee: Nick Walsh

20 August 2022 4	St Johnstone	0–1	Aberdeen	Perth
15:00 BST		Report	Clarkson 56'	Stadium: McDiarmid Park; Attendance: 5,871; Referee: Craig Napier

28 August 2022 5	Hearts	3–2	St Johnstone	Edinburgh
15:00 BST	Rowles 25'; Boyce 31'; Shankland 81' (pen.)	Report	Carey 6'; Considine 54'	Stadium: Tynecastle Park; Attendance: 18,353; Referee: John Beaton

3 September 2022 6	St Johnstone	3–0	St Mirren	Perth
15:00 BST	Clark 26'; Wright 66'; Carey 86' (pen.)	Report		Stadium: McDiarmid Park; Attendance: 3,640; Referee: Colin Steven

17 September 2022 8	St Johnstone	0–0	Ross County	Perth
15:00 BST		Report		Stadium: McDiarmid Park; Attendance: 3,355; Referee: Matthew MacDermid

1 October 2022 9	Dundee United	1–2	St Johnstone	Dundee
15:00 BST	Watt 82'	Report	May 15'; Hallberg 39'	Stadium: Tannadice Park; Attendance: 7,977; Referee: David Munro

5 October 2022 7	Kilmarnock	2–1	St Johnstone	Kilmarnock
19:45 BST	Armstrong 11', 46'	Report	Bair 90+1'	Stadium: Rugby Park; Attendance: 4,463; Referee: Alan Muir

8 October 2022 10	St Johnstone	1–2	Celtic	Perth
15:00 BST	Mitchell 90+3'	Report	Considine 42' (o.g.); Giakoumakis 90+5'	Stadium: McDiarmid Park; Attendance: 7,093; Referee: Euan Anderson

15 October 2022 11	Livingston	1–0	St Johnstone	Livingston
15:00 BST	Bahamboula 35'	Report		Stadium: Almondvale Stadium; Attendance: 1,554; Referee: Kevin Clancy

22 October 2022 12	Hibernian	1–2	St Johnstone	Edinburgh
15:00 BST	Kukharevych 35' Magennis (red card) 70'	Report	Clark 73' May 82'	Stadium: Easter Road; Attendance: 20,010; Referee: Kevin Clancy

29 October 2022 13	St Johnstone	1–0	Kilmarnock	Perth
15:00 BST	Taylor 4 o.g.'	Report		Stadium: McDiarmid Park; Attendance: 3,995; Referee: Craig Napier

6 November 2022 14	St Johnstone	2–1	Rangers	Perth
12:00 BST	Brown 41' Clark 62'	Report	Tavernier 74'	Stadium: McDiarmid Park; Attendance: 7,487; Referee: Steven McLean

9 November 2022 15	St Mirren	2–2	St Johnstone	Paisley
19:45 BST	Kiltie 42' O'Hara 81'	Report	Carey 33 pen.' Mitchell (red card) 63' Clark 90+6'	Stadium: St Mirren Park; Attendance: 5,387; Referee: Euan Anderson

12 November 2022 16	St Johnstone	1–1	Motherwell	Perth
15:00 BST	Wright 26'	Report	Spittal 45+1'	Stadium: McDiarmid Park; Attendance: 4,055; Referee: Nick Walsh

17 December 2022 17	Ross County	1–2	St Johnstone	Dingwall
15:00 BST	White 22' Baldwin (red card) 61'	Report	Crawford 77', 79'	Stadium: Victoria Park; Attendance: 4,393; Referee: Graham Grainger

24 December 2022 18	Celtic	4–1	St Johnstone	Glasgow
12:00 BST	Hatate 14', 52' Furuhashi 17', 40' Turnbull (red card) 90+6'	Report	Wright 67'	Stadium: Celtic Park; Attendance: 58,635; Referee: Kevin Clancy

28 December 2022 19	St Johnstone	2–3	Heart of Midlothian	Perth
15:00 BST	May 55 pen.'; Murphy 79'	Report	Shankland 14 pen.'; Forrest 33'; McKay 64'	Stadium: McDiarmid Park; Attendance: 7,058; Referee: William Collum

2 January 2023 20	St Johnstone	0–1	Dundee United	Perth
15:00 BST		Report	Watt 81'	Stadium: McDiarmid Park; Attendance: 7,116; Referee: Graham Grainger

7 January 2023 21	Aberdeen	2–0	St Johnstone	Aberdeen
15:00 BST	Duk 74', 84'	Report		Stadium: Pittodrie Stadium; Attendance: 14,202; Referee: Euan Anderson

14 January 2023 22	St Johnstone	2–4	Livingston	Perth
15:00 BST	Murphy 65'; McLennan 67'	Report	Kelly 8', 15'; Penrice 39', 81'	Stadium: McDiarmid Park; Attendance: 2,899; Referee: John Beaton

28 January 2023 23	Rangers	2–0	St Johnstone	Glasgow
15:00 BST	Tavernier 15 pen.'; Kamara 57'	Report	Clark (red card) 36'	Stadium: Ibrox Stadium; Attendance: 49,672; Referee: William Collum

1 February 2023 24	Motherwell	0–2	St Johnstone	Motherwell
19:45 BST		Report	Wright 5'; Hallberg 49'	Stadium: Fir Park; Attendance: 4,131; Referee: Don Robertson

5 February 2023 25	St Johnstone	1–4	Celtic	Perth
12:30 BST	Wright 25'; Considine (red card) 90+1'	Report	Considine 13 o.g.'; Furuhashi 22'; Mooy 38'; Turnbull 90+3'	Stadium: McDiarmid Park; Attendance: 7,758; Referee: David Dickinson

18 February 2023 26	Dundee United	1–2	St Johnstone	Dundee
15:00 BST	Levitt 81'	Report	May 31', 82'	Stadium: Tannadice Park; Attendance: 9,796; Referee: Kevin Clancy

25 February 2023 27	St Johnstone	1–1	St Mirren	Perth
15:00 BST	Phillips (red card) 45'; Rudden 75'	Report	Gogić 86'	Stadium: McDiarmid Park; Attendance: 3,828; Referee: Craig Napier

4 March 2023 28	Heart of Midlothian	3–0	St Johnstone	Edinburgh
15:00 BST	Ginnelly 21', 63'; Grant 73'	Report		Stadium: Tynecastle Park; Attendance: 18,596; Referee: Steven McLean

18 March 2023 29	Kilmarnock	1–1	St Johnstone	Kilmarnock
15:00 BST	Wright 38'	Report	Wright 70'	Stadium: Rugby Park; Attendance: 4,889; Referee: Chris Graham

1 April 2023 30	St Johnstone	0–1	Aberdeen	Perth
15:00 BST	Considine (red card) 6'	Report	Matthews 30 o.g.'; Shinnie (red card) 90+1'	Stadium: McDiarmid Park; Attendance: 6,001; Referee: Colin Steven

8 April 2023 31	St Johnstone	0–2	Ross County	Perth
15:00 BST		Report	Murray 45'; Cancola 49'	Stadium: McDiarmid Park; Attendance: 3,027; Referee: Alan Muir

15 April 2023 32	Livingston	2–0	St Johnstone	Livingston
15:00 BST	Nouble 23'; Kelly 38'	Report		Stadium: Tony Macaroni Arena; Attendance: 3,976; Referee: David Munro

22 April 2023 33	St Johnstone	1–1	Hibernian	Perth
15:00 BST	May 25'	Report	Stevenson 32'; Jeggo (red card) 48'	Stadium: McDiarmid Park; Attendance: 6,787; Referee: Craig Napier

6 May 2023 34	St Johnstone	1–0	Dundee United	Perth
15:00 BST	Gordon 43'	Report	Mulgrew (red card) 61'	Stadium: McDiarmid Park; Attendance: 7,071; Referee: Alan Muir

13 May 2023 35	St Johnstone	0–2	Motherwell	Perth
15:00 BST		Report	van Veen 52 pen.'; Mandron 90+3'	Stadium: McDiarmid Park; Referee: Grant Irvine

20 May 2023 36	Kilmarnock	0–1	St Johnstone	Kilmarnock
15:00 BST	Watson (red card) 44'	Report	Gordon 11'	Stadium: Rugby Park; Attendance: 6,004; Referee: John Beaton

24 May 2023 37	Ross County	3–3	St Johnstone	Dingwall
19:45 BST	Dhanda 54 pen.'; White 69'; Baldwin 90'	Report	May 22', 51 pen.'; McGowan 90+5'	Stadium: Victoria Park; Attendance: 4,700; Referee: Nick Walsh

28 May 2023 38	St Johnstone	2–0	Livingston	Perth
15:00 BST	Wright 17'; Kane 68 pen.'	Report		Stadium: McDiarmid Park; Attendance: 4,362; Referee: Graham Grainger

=== Scottish League Cup ===
Saints entered the 2022–23 Scottish League Cup at the group stage and were drawn into Group F with Annan Athletic, Ayr United, Elgin City and Queen of the South. Despite being reduced to nine men, Saints held on to draw 0–0 in the opening match at home to Annan Athletic but lost the penalty shootout 5–4. They also lost on penalties to Queen of the South after a 2–2 draw. Victories over Elgin City and Ayr United were a case of too little, too late, and Saints were eliminated from the competition after finishing third in Group F. Annan were the surprise group winners and Queen of the South were runners-up ahead of Saints on goal difference. The top two both qualified for the second round (the last 16).

12 July 2022 1	St Johnstone	0–0 (4–5 p)	Annan Athletic	Perth
19:45	Cleary (red card) 29'; MacPherson (red card) 89'	BBC Sport		Stadium: McDiarmid Park; Attendance: 2,036; Referee: Don Robertson
	Penalties
	Murphy (penalty scored); May (penalty scored); Davidson (penalty scored); O'Halloran (penalty missed); Carey (penalty scored); Considine (penalty missed)		(penalty scored) Goss; (penalty missed) Hooper; (penalty scored) Smith; (penalty scored) Docherty; (penalty scored) Wallace; (penalty scored) Galloway

16 July 2022 2	Queen of the South	2–2 (4–2 p)	St Johnstone	Dumfries
15:00	Connelly 12'; Paton 64'	BBC Sport	Murphy 49', 84'	Stadium: Palmerston Park; Attendance: 1,027; Referee: Graham Grainger
	Penalties
	Wilson (penalty scored); P.McKay (penalty scored); Todd (penalty scored); McGrory (penalty scored)		(penalty scored) Murphy; (penalty scored) Hallberg; (penalty missed) Davidson; (penalty missed) Kucheriavyi

19 July 2022 3	Elgin City	2–4	St Johnstone	Elgin
19:45	Dingwall 74'; Hester 85'	BBC Sport	Montgomery 11'; Hallberg 49'; May 62'; Ballantyne 70'	Stadium: Borough Briggs; Attendance: 886; Referee: Greg Aitken

23 July 2022 4	St Johnstone	1–0	Ayr United	Perth
15:00	Carey 2'	BBC Sport		Stadium: McDiarmid Park; Attendance: 2,036; Referee: Gavin Duncan

=== Scottish Cup ===
21 January 2023 Fourth Round	St Johnstone	0–1	Rangers	Perth
15:00 BST		BBC Report	Barišić 45'	Stadium: McDiarmid Park; Attendance: 7,855; Referee: Alan Muir

== Squad statistics ==
=== Appearances and goals ===
As of 28 May 2023

No.	Pos	Nat	Player	Total		Premiership		Scottish Cup		League Cup	
No.	Pos	Nat	Player	Apps	Goals	Apps	Goals	Apps	Goals	Apps	Goals
1	GK	(England) ENG	Remi Matthews	35	0	34	0	1	0	0	0
2	DF	(Malta) MLT	James Brown	30	1	25+1	1	1	0	3	0
3	DF	(Scotland) SCO	Tony Gallacher	5	0	2+3	0	0	0	0	0
4	DF	(Scotland) SCO	Andrew Considine	37	1	32	1	1	0	4	0
5	DF	(England) ENG	Alex Mitchell	29	1	25+4	1	0	0	0	0
6	DF	(Scotland) SCO	Liam Gordon	33	2	31+1	2	1	0	0	0
7	FW	(Scotland) SCO	Stevie May	42	10	34+3	9	1	0	4	1
8	MF	(Scotland) SCO	Murray Davidson	8	0	2+2	0	0	0	4	0
9	FW	(Scotland) SCO	Chris Kane	2	1	0+2	1	0	0	0	0
10	MF	(Canada) CAN	David Wotherspoon	23	0	7+15	0	0+1	0	0	0
12	GK	(England) ENG	Elliot Parish	6	0	2	0	0	0	4	0
13	DF	(Australia) AUS	Ryan McGowan	29	1	28	1	0	0	1	0
14	MF	(England) ENG	Drey Wright	40	7	37+1	7	1	0	1	0
16	FW	(Scotland) SCO	Zak Rudden	12	1	2+10	1	0	0	0	0
17	FW	(Canada) CAN	Theo Bair	31	2	8+19	2	0+1	0	3	0
18	MF	(Scotland) SCO	Cammy MacPherson	25	0	18+4	0	1	0	2	0
19	DF	(Scotland) SCO	Adam Montgomery	33	1	27+1	0	1	0	4	1
20	GK	(Scotland) SCO	Ross Sinclair	2	0	2	0	0	0	0	0
22	MF	(Sweden) SWE	Melker Hallberg	35	3	28+2	2	1	0	4	1
23	MF	(Republic of Ireland) IRL	Graham Carey	35	4	24+6	3	0+1	0	4	1
25	MF	(Scotland) SCO	Cammy Ballantyne	4	1	3	0	0	0	1	1
26	MF	(Scotland) SCO	Connor McLennan	27	1	8+18	1	1	0	0	0
29	FW	(Scotland) SCO	Jamie Murphy	29	5	15+9	3	0+1	0	4	2
34	MF	(Trinidad and Tobago) TRI	Daniel Phillips	23	0	17+5	0	1	0	0	0
37	FW	(Scotland) SCO	Nicky Clark	21	4	19+1	4	0+1	0	0	0
Departures
5	DF	(Republic of Ireland) IRL	Dan Cleary	2	0	0	0	0	0	2	0
11	FW	(Scotland) SCO	Michael O'Halloran	8	0	2+2	0	0	0	4	0
15	MF	(Scotland) SCO	Charlie Gilmour	2	0	0	0	0	0	2	0
16	DF	(Republic of Ireland) IRL	John Mahon	3	0	0	0	0	0	3	0
17	FW	(Finland) FIN	Eetu Vertainen	0	0	0	0	0	0	0	0
21	MF	(Scotland) SCO	Ali Crawford	19	2	5+12	2	0	0	2	0
27	MF	(Ukraine) UKR	Max Kucheriavyi	8	0	2+2	0	0	0	4	0
33	FW	(Scotland) SCO	Taylor Steven	2	0	0	0	0	0	2	0

== Team statistics ==
=== League table ===
Pos	Team	Pld	W	D	L	GF	GA	GD	Pts	Qualification or relegation (Note: Teams play each other three times (33 matches), before the league is split into two groups (the top six and the bottom six).)
7	Motherwell	38	14	8	16	53	51	+2	50	
8	Livingston	38	13	7	18	36	60	−24	46	
9	St Johnstone	38	12	7	19	41	59	−18	43	
10	Kilmarnock	38	11	7	20	37	62	−25	40	
11	Ross County (O)	38	9	7	22	37	60	−23	34	Qualification for the Premiership play-off final

Rules for classification: 1) Points; 2) Goal difference; 3) Goals scored; 4) Head-to-Head points; 5) Head-to-Head goal difference; 6) Play-off (only if deciding champion, UEFA competitions qualification, second stage group allocation or relegation).
(O) Play-off winners

=== League Cup table ===
Pos	Team	Pld	W	PW	PL	L	GF	GA	GD	Pts	Qualification	ANN	QOS	STJ	AYR	ELG
1	Annan Athletic	4	2	2	0	0	8	3	+5	10	Qualification for the second round	—	—	—	p1–1	4–0
2	Queen of the South	4	2	1	0	1	9	5	+4	8	Qualification for the second round	2–3	—	p2–2	—	—
3	St Johnstone	4	2	0	2	0	7	4	+3	8		0–0p	—	—	1–0	—
4	Ayr United	4	1	0	1	2	4	5	−1	4		—	0–3	—	—	3–0 (Note: Ayr United were awarded a technical 3−0 win over Elgin City, who fielded an ineligible player. The match had originally finished 0–0, with Ayr United securing the bonus point following a 4–3 win on penalties.)
5	Elgin City	4	0	0	0	4	2	13	−11	0		—	0–2	2–4	—	—

Rules for classification: 1) goal difference, 2) goals scored, 3) away goals scored, 4) matches won, 5) away matches won, 6) drawing of lots.

== Transfers ==
In Scottish football, the summer 2022 transfer window officially opened on 10 June and closed on 31 August.

=== In ===
Date	Player	Transferred from	Fee	Source
16 June 2022	(Scotland) Andrew Considine	(Scotland) Aberdeen	Free	
16 June 2022	(England) Drey Wright	(Scotland) Hibernian	Free	
28 June 2022	(Scotland) Adam Montgomery	(Scotland) Celtic	Loan	
1 July 2022	(Republic of Ireland) Graham Carey	(Bulgaria) CSKA Sofia	Free	
5 July 2022	(Scotland) Jamie Murphy	(Scotland) Hibernian	Free	
22 July 2022	(Australia) Ryan McGowan	Kuwait SC	Free	
26 July 2022	(Sweden) William Sandford	(Sweden) IFK Gothenburg	Free	
27 July 2022	(England) Remi Matthews	(England) Crystal Palace	Loan	
27 July 2022	(England) Alex Mitchell	(England) Millwall	Loan	
10 August 2022	(Trinidad and Tobago) Daniel Phillips	(England) Watford	Free	
31 August 2022	(Scotland) Nicky Clark	(Scotland) Dundee United	Undisclosed	
1 September 2022	(Scotland) Connor McLennan	(Scotland) Aberdeen	Loan	
31 January 2023	(Scotland) Zak Rudden	(Scotland) Dundee	Loan	

=== Out ===
Date	Player	Transferred to	Fee	Source
25 May 2022	(Scotland) Shaun Rooney	(England) Fleetwood Town	Free	
27 May 2022	(Nigeria) Efe Ambrose	(Scotland) Greenock Morton	Free	
27 May 2022	(Turkey) Nadir Ciftci	Free agent	Free	
27 May 2022	(Scotland) Liam Craig	Retired	Free	
27 May 2022	(England) Jahmal Hector-Ingram	Free agent	Free	
3 June 2022	(Scotland) Craig Bryson	(Scotland) Stenhousemuir	Free	
12 June 2022	(Scotland) Jordan Northcott	(Scotland) Brechin City	Free	
16 June 2022	(Scotland) Sam Denham	(Scotland) East Fife	Free	
17 June 2022	(Scotland) Callum Hendry	(England) Salford City	Free	
30 June 2022	(Finland) Eetu Vertainen	(Northern Ireland) Linfield	Loan	
18 July 2022	(England) Jacob Butterfield	(England) Scunthorpe United	Free	
28 July 2022	(Republic of Ireland) Dan Cleary	(Republic of Ireland) Shamrock Rovers	Free	
28 July 2022	(Scotland) Alex Ferguson	(Scotland) East Fife	Loan	
28 July 2022	(Scotland) Ross Sinclair	(Scotland) Montrose	Loan	
16 August 2022	(Scotland) Charlie Gilmour	(Scotland) Cove Rangers	Loan	
16 August 2022	(Scotland) Taylor Steven	(Scotland) East Fife	Loan	
13 January 2023	(Republic of Ireland) John Mahon	(Republic of Ireland) Sligo Rovers	Free	
16 February 2023	(Ukraine) Max Kucheriavyi	(Scotland) Falkirk	Loan	
24 February 2023	(Scotland) Ali Crawford	(Scotland) Greenock Morton	Loan	
24 February 2023	(Scotland) Michael O'Halloran	(Scotland) Cove Rangers	Loan	

== See also ==
- List of St Johnstone F.C. seasons
