= Adam Montgomery =

Scottish footballer (born 2002)

Personal information
- Date of birth: 18 July 2002 (age 24)
- Place of birth: Livingston, Scotland
- Height: 1.73 m (5 ft 8 in)
- Positions: Left-back; left winger

Team information
- Current team: Livingston (on loan from Celtic)
- Number: 24

Youth career
- 2009–2019: Celtic

Senior career*
Years	Team	Apps	(Gls)
2019–	Celtic	10	(0)
2022	→ Aberdeen (loan)	7	(0)
2022–2023	→ St Johnstone (loan)	27	(0)
2023–2024	→ Fleetwood Town (loan)	3	(0)
2024	→ Motherwell (loan)	0	(0)
2025	→ Queen's Park (loan)	12	(1)
2025–2026	→ Livingston (loan)	8	(0)
2026–	→ Livingston (loan)	0	(0)
- * Club domestic league appearances and goals as of 22:03, 26 October 2025 (UTC)

Adam Montgomery (born 18 July 2002) is a Scottish professional footballer who plays as a left-back or a left winger for Scottish Championship club Livingston, on loan from Scottish Premiership club Celtic.

== Career ==
Montgomery signed his first professional contract with Celtic in July 2019, and he extended his contract to 2025 in February 2021. After making the bench for the first team on four occasions, he made his professional debut for Celtic on 12 May 2021, starting in a 4–0 win over St Johnstone.

On 31 January 2022, he joined Aberdeen on loan until the end of the 2021–22 season.

On 3 July 2023, he signed for League One club Fleetwood Town on a season-long loan deal.

On 15 January 2024, Montgomery joined Motherwell on loan until the end of the 2023–24 season. On 1 February 2024, he returned to Celtic after suffering a serious injury during a training session.

In July 2025, Montgomery signed for Livingston on loan. His loan agreement ended early in January 2026 due to another injury setback.

== Style of play ==
Montgomery started out as a forward at the club before being moved into defence by coach Darren O'Dea, and that paid off in February 2021 when the youngster extended his contract to 2025.

== Career statistics ==
As of match played 18 October 2025

Appearances and goals by club, season and competition
Club	Season	League			National cup (Note: Includes Scottish Cup and FA Cup)		League cup (Note: Includes Scottish League Cup and EFL Cup)		Continental		Other		Total	
Club	Season	Division	Apps	Goals	Apps	Goals	Apps	Goals	Apps	Goals	Apps	Goals	Apps	Goals
Celtic	2020–21	Scottish Premiership	2	0	0	0	0	0	0	0	—		2	0
Celtic	2021–22	Scottish Premiership	8	0	0	0	2	0	8 (Note: One appearance in UEFA Champions League; Seven appearances in UEFA Europa League)	0	—		18	0
Celtic	2022–23	Scottish Premiership	0	0	0	0	0	0	0	0	—		0	0
Celtic	2023–24	Scottish Premiership	0	0	0	0	0	0	0	0	—		0	0
Celtic	2024–25	Scottish Premiership	0	0	0	0	0	0	0	0	—		0	0
Celtic	2025–26	Scottish Premiership	0	0	0	0	0	0	0	0	—		0	0
Celtic	Total		10	0	0	0	2	0	8	0	—		20	0
Aberdeen (loan)	2021–22	Scottish Premiership	7	0	1	0	—		—		—		8	0
St Johnstone (loan)	2022–23	Scottish Premiership	28	0	1	0	4	1	—		—		33	1
Fleetwood Town (loan)	2023–24	League One	3	0	1	0	0	0	—		2 (Note: Appearance(s) in EFL Trophy)	0	6	0
Motherwell (loan)	2023–24	Scottish Premiership	0	0	1	0	—		—		—		1	0
Queen's Park (loan)	2024–25	Scottish Championship	12	1	1	0	—		—		1 (Note: Appearance(s) in Scottish Challenge Cup)	0	14	1
Livingston (loan)	2025–26	Scottish Premiership	8	0	0	0	1	1	—		—		9	1
Career total			68	1	5	0	7	2	8	0	3	0	91	3

== Honours ==
Celtic

- Scottish Premiership: 2021–22
- Scottish League Cup: 2021–22

Queen's Park

- Scottish Challenge Cup runner-up: 2024–25
