= Lennon Miller =

Scottish footballer

Personal information
- Full name: Lennon Lee Miller
- Date of birth: 25 August 2006 (age 20)
- Place of birth: Wishaw, Scotland
- Height: 1.82 m (6 ft 0 in)
- Position: Midfielder

Team information
- Current team: Udinese
- Number: 38

Youth career
- 2014–2022: Motherwell

Senior career*
Years	Team	Apps	(Gls)
2022–2025	Motherwell	61	(2)
2025–	Udinese	33	(0)

International career^{‡}
2021–2022	Scotland U16		
2021–2023	Scotland U17	8	(0)
2023–2024	Scotland U19	5	(0)
2024–	Scotland U21	6	(3)
2025–	Scotland	4	(0)
- * Club domestic league appearances and goals as of 6 November 2026 ‡ National team caps and goals as of 11:31, 13 November 2026 (UTC)

Lennon Lee Miller (born 25 August 2006) is a Scottish professional footballer who plays as a midfielder for Serie A club Udinese and the Scotland national team. He began his career with Motherwell, moving to Italy in August 2025.

== Club career ==
=== Motherwell ===
Miller began his career in the youth system at Motherwell from the age of seven. He made his senior debut as a second-half substitute in a 4–0 home victory over Inverness Caledonian Thistle in the Scottish League Cup six days after his 16th birthday on 31 August 2022, becoming the youngest player in a major competition across the club's 136-year history. He was an unused substitute for the first team for several fixtures during the 2022–23 season, with his first appearance in the Scottish Premiership coming in a 3–0 loss to Rangers on 28 December 2022.

He started all of Motherwell's Premiership matches at the start of the 2023–24 season but was sent off for a last-man challenge in the eighth round of fixtures against Livingston. He returned against Aberdeen on 1 November, but came off injured with a fractured patella assessed to rule him out of action for at least three months. Two weeks later he agreed a contract extension, tying him to Motherwell until 2026. Miller was nominated for the SFWA Young Player of the Year and the PFA Scotland Young Player of the Year, but lost out in both votes to his Scotland under-19 midfield partner, David Watson of Kilmarnock.

With Paul McGinn and Stephen O'Donnell unavailable due to injury, 18-year-old Miller was named as team captain for Motherwell in the semi-final of the 2024–25 Scottish League Cup at Hampden Park (his first senior appearance at the national stadium); they took the lead against Rangers, but ultimately lost 2–1. He suffered a hairline fracture to his ankle in another match against Rangers on 29 December 2024.

=== Udinese ===
Amid intense media speculation regarding his future, Miller did not play in Motherwell's first six fixtures of the 2025–26 season, ostensibly due to injury. On 12 August 2025 it was confirmed that he had signed for Serie A club Udinese on a five-year contract and a transfer fee reported as £4.75 million including potential add-ons, a record for the Scottish club.

Miller scored his first goal for Udinese in his first start for the team on 23 September 2025, heading home on a rebound to increase his side's lead to 2–0 against Palermo in the 2025–26 Coppa Italia Round of 32; Udinese advanced with a 2–1 victory.

== International career ==
Miller made his debut for the Scotland under-16s aged 14 in August 2021 against England, in which he scored directly from the kick-off as play resumed at the start of the second half – the strike was recorded on video, and was later awarded as the Goal of the Year in Scottish international football across all levels.

Miller played for Scotland under-17s in the 2022 UEFA European Under-17 Championship tournament held in Israel, and was still young enough to take part again when the Scots also qualified for the 2023 tournament in Hungary. He made his debut for the under-21s in June 2024, with fellow highly-regarded midfielder David Watson doing likewise.

On 11 March 2025, Miller was called up to the senior side for the first time for the Nations League play-offs against Greece. Miller then made his full international debut in June 2025, appearing as a substitute against Iceland and then starting against Liechtenstein.

== Personal life ==
Lennon is the son of former Scotland international footballer Lee Miller; his mother Donna died when he was five years old. He has one older brother and two younger brothers. He attended Coltness High School in Wishaw, where his PE teacher rated Miller more highly than other future elite players he had seen as adolescents, including David Turnbull who also emerged as a midfielder with Motherwell and whose 2020 departure was the club's record sale until eclipsed by the fee paid for Miller five years later.

== Career statistics ==
As of match played 6 November 2026

Appearances and goals by club, season and competition
Club	Season	League			National cup (Note: Includes Scottish Cup, Coppa Italia)		League cup (Note: Includes Scottish League Cup)		Total	
Club	Season	Division	Apps	Goals	Apps	Goals	Apps	Goals	Apps	Goals
Motherwell	2022–23	Scottish Premiership	4	0	0	0	1	0	5	0
Motherwell	2023–24	Scottish Premiership	25	0	2	0	5	2	32	2
Motherwell	2024–25	Scottish Premiership	32	2	0	0	7	2	39	4
Motherwell	Total		61	2	2	0	13	4	76	6
Udinese	2025–26	Serie A	24	0	2	1	—		26	1
Udinese	2026–27	Serie A	9	0	2	0	—		11	0
Udinese	Total		33	0	4	1	—		37	1
Career total			94	2	6	1	13	4	113	7

== See also ==
- List of Scottish football families
