= Theo Bair =

Canadian soccer player (born 1999)

Personal information
- Full name: Thelonius Alston Bradley Bair
- Date of birth: August 27, 1999 (age 27)
- Place of birth: Ottawa, Ontario, Canada
- Height: 1.91 m (6 ft 3 in)
- Position: Forward

Team information
- Current team: Bolton Wanderers (on loan from Auxerre)
- Number: 9

Youth career
- Ottawa Royals
- Capital United
- –2015: West Ottawa SC
- 2015–2018: Vancouver Whitecaps FC

Senior career*
Years	Team	Apps	(Gls)
2019–2021	Vancouver Whitecaps FC	37	(3)
2021	→ HamKam (loan)	17	(4)
2022–2023	St Johnstone	34	(1)
2023–2024	Motherwell	38	(15)
2024–	Auxerre	32	(2)
2025–2026	→ Lausanne-Sport (loan)	23	(6)
2026–	→ Bolton Wanderers (loan)	5	(1)

International career^{‡}
2018	Canada U20	5	(1)
2018	Canada U21	4	(1)
2021	Canada U23	4	(0)
2020–	Canada	7	(1)
- * Club domestic league appearances and goals as of October 17, 2026 ‡ National team caps and goals as of November 13, 2025

Thelonius Alston Bradley Bair (born August 27, 1999) is a Canadian professional soccer player who plays as a forward for EFL Championship side Bolton Wanderers, on loan from Ligue 1 club Auxerre, and the Canada national team.

== Club career ==
=== Youth ===
Bair started his youth career with Ottawa Royals, before joining Capital United FC and West Ottawa SC before his move to Vancouver.

=== Vancouver Whitecaps FC ===
On July 24, 2018, Vancouver Whitecaps FC announced that it would be signing Bair to a multi-year MLS homegrown pre-contract beginning in 2019. Bair made his Whitecaps FC and MLS debut on matchday 15 of the 2019 MLS season, coming off the bench in the 71st minute in a 2–1 home victory against FC Dallas. On August 11 against the Portland Timbers, He scored his first professional goal.

On August 6, 2021, Bair was loaned to Norwegian club HamKam for the remainder of the 2021 season. In his first appearance on August 18, Bair scored a goal in a 2–0 victory over Jerv. Bair would go on to make 17 appearances in the 1. divisjon, scoring 4 goals as HamKam were crowned champions and gained promotion to the 2022 Eliteserien. In December 2021, upon his return to Vancouver, the Whitecaps announced they had exercised Bair's contract option, keeping him at the club through 2022.

=== St Johnstone ===
In January 2022, Bair was transferred to Scottish Premiership club St Johnstone for an undisclosed fee on a contract through the end of the 2023–24 season. He made his debut on February 9 against St Mirren. Bair scored his first goal for the club against Kilmarnock on October 5, 2022. In May 2023, St Johnstone announced Bair would be made available for transfer. On 4 July 2023, Bair and St Johnstone mutually agreed to terminate the contract.

=== Motherwell ===
In August 2023, Motherwell announced the signing of Bair to a two-year contract. He made his debut on August 5 against Dundee and scored a goal in an eventual 1–1 draw.

=== Auxerre ===
On July 16, 2024, newly promoted side Auxerre announced the signing of Bair to a four-year deal. He made his debut for the club on August 18, starting Auxerre's first match of the season against Nice.

=== Lausanne-Sport ===
In September 2025, Bair would be loaned to Swiss Super League side Lausanne-Sport, with an option to buy.

== International career ==
=== Youth ===
Born in Canada, Bair is of Jamaican descent. In 2018, he represented Canada at the U21 level at the 2018 Toulon Tournament. He subsequently played for the Canadian U20 team at the 2018 CONCACAF U-20 Championship and, scoring a goal and two assists in five appearances. Bair was named to the Canadian U-23 provisional roster for the 2020 CONCACAF Men's Olympic Qualifying Championship on February 26, 2020, and was named to the final squad ahead of the rescheduled tournament on March 10, 2021.

=== Senior ===
In January 2020, Bair was called up to the Canada senior team ahead of friendlies against Barbados and Iceland. He made his debut on January 7 in the first match against Barbados, and scored a goal in a 4–1 victory.

In February 2024, Bair was named to the Canada national team provisional roster for the 2024 Copa América qualifying play-offs against Trinidad and Tobago. In June 2024, Bair was named to Canada's squad contesting the 2024 Copa América.

== Career statistics ==
=== Club ===
As of match played October 17, 2026

Appearances and goals by club, season and competition
Club	Season	League			National cup (Note: Includes Canadian Championship, Scottish Cup, Swiss Cup)		League cup (Note: Includes Scottish League Cup)		Other		Total	
Club	Season	Division	Apps	Goals	Apps	Goals	Apps	Goals	Apps	Goals	Apps	Goals
Vancouver Whitecaps FC	2019	MLS	17	2	1	0	—		—		18	2
Vancouver Whitecaps FC	2020	MLS	16 (Note: Includes three appearance in MLS is Back Tournament group stage)	1	—		—		1 (Note: Appearance in MLS is Back Tournament knockout stage)	0	17	1
Vancouver Whitecaps FC	2021	MLS	4	0	0	0	—		—		4	0
Vancouver Whitecaps FC	Total		37	3	1	0	—		1	0	39	3
HamKam (loan)	2021	Norwegian First Division	17	4	0	0	—		—		17	4
St Johnstone	2021–22	Scottish Premiership	7	0	0	0	0	0	—		7	0
St Johnstone	2022–23	Scottish Premiership	27	1	1	0	3	0	—		31	1
St Johnstone	Total		34	1	1	0	3	0	—		38	1
Motherwell	2023–24	Scottish Premiership	38	15	2	0	1	0	—		41	15
Auxerre	2024–25	Ligue 1	29	2	1	0	—		—		30	2
Auxerre	2025–26	Ligue 1	2	0	0	0	—		—		2	0
Auxerre	2026–27	Ligue 1	1	0	0	0	—		—		1	0
Auxerre	Total		32	2	1	0	0	0	0	0	33	2
Lausanne-Sport (loan)	2025–26	Swiss Super League	23	6	2	2	—		6 (Note: Appearances in UEFA Conference League)	2	31	10
Bolton Wanderers (loan)	2026–27	EFL Championship	5	1	0	0	0	0	0	0	5	1
Career total			186	32	7	2	4	0	7	2	204	36

=== International ===
As of match played November 13, 2025

Appearances and goals by national team and year
National team	Year	Apps	Goals
Canada	2020	2	1
Canada	2021	0	0
Canada	2022	0	0
Canada	2023	0	0
Canada	2024	3	0
Canada	2025	2	0
Total		7	1

Scores and results list Canada's goal tally first.

List of international goals scored by Theo Bair
No.	Date	Venue	Opponent	Score	Result	Competition
1.	January 7, 2020	Championship Soccer Stadium, Irvine, United States	Barbados	4–1	4–1	Friendly

== Honours ==
Individual

- PFA Scotland Team of the Year: 2023–24 Premiership
