= 2023–24 Kilmarnock F.C. season =

Kilmarnock
2023–24 season
- Chairman: Billy Bowie
- Manager: Derek McInnes
- Stadium: Rugby Park
- Premiership: 4th
- Scottish Cup: Quarter-final
- League Cup: Quarter-final
- Top goalscorer: League: Kyle Vassell; Marley Watkins (9 goals); All: Marley Watkins (13 goals)
Home colours	Away colours	Third colours

The 2023–24 season is the 145th season of competitive association football and the 11th season in the Scottish Professional Football League played by Kilmarnock Football Club, a professional football club based in Kilmarnock, Ayrshire, Scotland. The club is competing in the top tier of Scottish football for the second consecutive season.

== Overview ==
Seven players were released by Kilmarnock following the end of their contracts during the summer including Blair Alston, Lee Hodson, Dylan McGowan, Alan Power, Scott Robinson, Chris Stokes and Calum Waters. Three players – Innes Cameron, Brad Lyons and Fraser Murray – signed new contracts while Ryan Alebiosu, Luke Chambers, Ben Chrisene, Christian Doidge, Jeriel Dorsett, Zach Hemming, Jordan Jones and Lewis Mayo returned to their parent clubs following the completion of their loan deals.

Kilmarnock arranged a pre-season training camp in Belfast, Northern Ireland which included friendlies against Glentoran and Linfield.

The draw for the League Cup was made on 8 June 2023 and Kilmarnock were drawn in Group F with Raith Rovers, Dunfermline Athletic, Annan Athletic and Albion Rovers. They began the campaign on 15 July at home to Annan Athletic and concluded their group stage fixtures on 29 July away to Albion Rovers.

Fixtures for the 2023–24 Premiership were released on 30 June 2023 and the season began on the weekend of 5 August 2023.

== Results and fixtures ==
=== Pre-season ===
Date	Opponents	H / A	Result F–A	Scorers
4 July 2023	Glentoran	A	0–1	
8 July 2023	Linfield	A	0–1	

=== Premiership ===
Date	Opponents	H / A	Result F–A	Scorers	Attendance	League position
5 August 2023	Rangers	H	1–0	Lyons 65'	9,256	3rd
13 August 2023	Heart of Midlothian	A	0–0		18,455	5th
26 August 2023	Motherwell	A	1–2	Watkins 12'	5,758	7th
2 September 2023	Ross County	H	0–1		5,258	9th
16 September 2023	Hibernian	H	2–2	Vassell 61', Wright 79'	6,277	8th
23 September 2023	Dundee	A	2–2	Armstrong 30' (pen.), 81'	6,101	8th
30 September 2023	St Mirren	H	1–1	Lyons 19'	6,124	8th
7 October 2023	Celtic	A	1–3	Watson 72'	58,295	9th
21 October 2023	Livingston	H	3–1	Armstrong 16', Vassell 42', 60'	4,679	5th
29 October 2023	Aberdeen	H	2–0	Vassell 45+4', Watkins 64'	5,480	4th
1 November 2023	St Johnstone	A	1–2	Vassell 47'	2,840	5th
4 November 2023	Motherwell	H	1–0	Cameron 49'	5,553	4th
11 November 2023	Hibernian	A	0–1		16,250	6th
25 November 2023	Ross County	A	0–0		4,013	6th
2 December 2023	Heart of Midlothian	H	0–1		5,915	7th
6 December 2023	Aberdeen	A	1–0	Watson 90+2'	13,668	6th
10 December 2023	Celtic	H	2–1	Phillips 75' (o.g.), Kennedy 87'	7,706	5th
16 December 2023	Livingston	A	0–0		2,820	5th
23 December 2023	St Johnstone	H	2–1	Watson 6', Watkins 17'	5,074	4th
27 December 2023	St Mirren	A	1–0	Watkins 25'	7,534	4th
30 December 2023	Dundee	H	2–2	Wright 85', McKenzie 90+3'	5,780	4th
2 January 2024	Rangers	A	1–3	Armstrong 58' (pen.)	49,250	4th
27 January 2024	Hibernian	H	2–2	Vente 25' (o.g.), Kennedy 54'	6,501	4th
3 February 2024	Motherwell	A	1–1	Mayo 13'	5,491	4th
7 February 2024	Livingston	H	1–0	Watkins 88'	4,328	4th
17 February 2024	Celtic	A	1–1	Watson 90+2'	58,887	4th
24 February 2024	Aberdeen	H	2–0	Ndaba 45+5', Kennedy 58'	6,230	4th
28 February 2024	Rangers	H	1–2	Armstrong 11' (pen.)	9,576	4th
2 March 2024	Dundee	A	2–2	Watkins 35', Deas 90+1'	5,588	5th
16 March 2024	St Mirren	H	5–2	Vassell 61', 73', Armstrong 65' (pen.), Watkins 68', Watson 79'	8,460	4th
30 March 2024	Heart of Midlothian	A	1–1	Watkins 67'	18,799	4th
6 April 2024	Ross County	H	1–0	Vassell 64'	5,473	4th
13 April 2024	St Johnstone	A	2–0	Wright 23', Watkins 81'	4,087	4th
27 April 2024	Heart of Midlothian	H	0–0		6,677	4th
5 May 2024	Rangers	A	1–4	Tavernier 12' (o.g.)	49,553	4th
11 May 2024	St Mirren	A	1–0	Vassell 37'	7,645	4th
15 May 2024	Celtic	H	0–5		9,595	4th
18 May 2024	Dundee	A	1–1	Mackay-Steven 24'	6,637	4th

=== Scottish Cup ===
Date	Round	Opponents	H / A	Result F–A	Scorers	Attendance
20 January 2024	Fourth round	Dundee	H	2–0	Vassell 1', Watkins 3'	5,425
10 February 2024	Fifth round	Cove Rangers	H	2–0	Watkins 45', Armstrong 81'	4,407
9 March 2024	Quarter-final	Aberdeen	A	1–3	Armstrong 41'	10,879

=== League Cup ===
Date	Round	Opponents	H / A	Result F–A	Scorers	Attendance
15 July 2023	Group stage	Annan Athletic	H	3–0	Armstrong 5' (pen.), Murray 16', Cameron 50'	3,142
22 July 2023	Group stage	Dunfermline Athletic	A	2–0	Murray 4', Vassell 81'	2,784
26 July 2023	Group stage	Raith Rovers	H	2–2 (4–5p)	Cameron 42', Findlay 80'	3,316
29 July 2023	Group stage	Albion Rovers	A	2–1	Findlay 7', Watkins 41'	1,093
20 August 2023	Second round	Celtic	H	1–0	Watkins 60'	8,002
26 September 2023	Quarter-final	Heart of Midlothian	H	1–2	Lyons 68'	6,014

== Squad statistics ==
No.	Pos.	Name	Premiership		Scottish Cup		League Cup		Total		Discipline	
No.	Pos.	Name	Apps	Goals	Apps	Goals	Apps	Goals	Apps	Goals	Yellow card	Red card
1	GK	(England) Will Dennis	36	0	2	0	6	0	44	0	1	0
3	DF	(Republic of Ireland) Corrie Ndaba	28	1	3	0	6	0	37	1	2	1
4	DF	(Wales) Joe Wright	29	3	2	0	1	0	32	3	8	1
5	DF	(Scotland) Lewis Mayo	36	1	3	0	5	0	44	1	5	1
6	DF	(Scotland) Robbie Deas	29	1	1	0	4	0	34	1	12	1
7	MF	(Scotland) Rory McKenzie	28	1	2	0	2	0	32	1	3	0
8	MF	(Northern Ireland) Brad Lyons	22	2	0	0	6	1	28	3	6	0
9	FW	(Northern Ireland) Kyle Vassell	35	9	3	1	3	1	41	11	4	0
10	MF	(Northern Ireland) Matty Kennedy	35	3	2	0	6	0	43	3	3	0
11	MF	(Scotland) Daniel Armstrong	38	6	3	2	6	1	47	9	10	0
12	MF	(Scotland) David Watson	36	5	3	0	6	0	45	5	10	0
14	DF	(England) Jack Sanders	0	0	0	0	1	0	1	0	0	1
14	MF	(England) James Balagizi	5	0	2	0	0	0	7	0	0	0
15	MF	(Scotland) Fraser Murray	14	0	2	0	4	2	20	2	1	0
16	MF	(Scotland) Kyle Magennis	8	0	0	0	6	0	14	0	1	0
17	DF	(Scotland) Stuart Findlay	36	0	3	0	6	2	45	2	7	0
18	FW	(Scotland) Innes Cameron	10	1	1	0	4	2	15	3	1	0
19	DF	(Wales) Tom Davies	6	0	0	0	0	0	6	0	0	0
20	GK	(Republic of Ireland) Kieran O'Hara	3	0	1	0	0	0	4	0	0	0
21	FW	(Scotland) Andrew Dallas	14	0	0	0	1	0	15	0	0	0
21	FW	(Scotland) Greg Stewart	8	0	3	0	0	0	11	0	1	0
22	MF	(Northern Ireland) Liam Donnelly	26	0	3	0	1	0	30	0	8	0
23	FW	(Wales) Marley Watkins	35	9	3	2	4	2	42	13	4	0
29	MF	(Scotland) Aaron Brown	1	0	0	0	0	0	1	0	0	0
31	MF	(Scotland) Liam Polworth	24	0	3	0	4	0	31	0	2	0
39	MF	(Scotland) Gary Mackay-Steven	9	1	1	0	0	0	10	1	0	0
99	FW	(Netherlands) Kevin van Veen	12	0	1	0	0	0	13	0	2	0

== Club statistics ==
=== Competition overview ===
Competition	First match	Last match	Record							
Competition	First match	Last match	Pld	W	D	L	GF	GA	GD	Win %
Premiership	5 August 2023	18 May 2024	38	14	14	10	46	44	+2	36.84
Scottish Cup	20 January 2024	9 March 2024	3	2	0	1	5	3	+2	66.67
League Cup	15 July 2023	26 September 2023	6	4	1	1	11	4	+7	66.67
Total			47	20	15	12	62	51	+11	42.55

Source: Competitions

=== League table ===
Pos	Team	Pld	W	D	L	GF	GA	GD	Pts	Qualification or relegation (Note: Teams play each other three times (33 matches), before the league is split into two groups (the top six and the bottom six).)
2	Rangers	38	27	4	7	87	32	+55	85	Qualification for the Champions League third qualifying round
3	Heart of Midlothian	38	20	8	10	54	42	+12	68	Qualification for the Europa League play-off round (Note: As the winners of the 2023–24 Scottish Cup, Celtic, qualified for the Champions League, the berth reserved for the cup winners (Europa League play-off round) passed to the third-placed team. The berths for the Europa League second qualifying round and the Conference League second qualifying round were passed down to the fourth- and fifth-placed teams.)
4	Kilmarnock	38	14	14	10	46	44	+2	56	Qualification for the Europa League second qualifying round
5	St Mirren	38	13	8	17	46	52	−6	47	Qualification for the Conference League second qualifying round
6	Dundee	38	10	12	16	49	68	−19	42	

Rules for classification: 1) Points; 2) Goal difference; 3) Goals scored; 4) Head-to-Head points; 5) Head-to-Head goal difference; 6) Play-off (only if deciding champion, UEFA competitions qualification, second stage group allocation or relegation).

=== League Cup table ===
Pos	Team	Pld	W	PW	PL	L	GF	GA	GD	Pts	Qualification	KIL	RAI	DNF	ALB	ANN
1	Kilmarnock	4	3	0	1	0	9	3	+6	10	Qualification for the second round	—	2–2p	—	—	3–0
2	Raith Rovers	4	2	1	1	0	8	5	+3	9	Qualification for the second round	—	—	1–1p	2–0	—
3	Dunfermline Athletic	4	2	1	0	1	8	3	+5	8		0–2	—	—	—	4–0
4	Albion Rovers	4	1	0	0	3	3	8	−5	3		1–2	—	0–3	—	—
5	Annan Athletic	4	0	0	0	4	3	12	−9	0		—	2–3	—	1–2	—

Rules for classification: 1) goal difference, 2) goals scored, 3) away goals scored, 4) matches won, 5) away matches won, 6) drawing of lots.

== Transfers ==
=== Transfers in ===
Date	Position	Name	Previous club	Fee	Ref.
5 June 2023	DF	Robbie Deas	Inverness Caledonian Thistle	Free	
21 June 2023	MF	Kyle Magennis	Hibernian	Free	
21 June 2023	GK	(England) Will Dennis	(England) Bournemouth	Loan	
21 June 2023	MF	(Northern Ireland) Matty Kennedy	Aberdeen	Free	
22 June 2023	DF	(Republic of Ireland) Corrie Ndaba	(England) Ipswich Town	Loan	
11 July 2023	GK	(Republic of Ireland) Kieran O'Hara	(England) Colchester United	Free	
14 July 2023	DF	Stuart Findlay	(England) Oxford United	Loan	
20 July 2023	DF	Lewis Mayo	Rangers	Undisclosed	
21 July 2023	FW	(Wales) Marley Watkins	Aberdeen	Free	
26 July 2023	DF	(Wales) Tom Davies	(Wales) Cardiff City	Loan	
1 September 2023	FW	Andrew Dallas	(England) Barnsley	Loan	
5 December 2023	MF	Gary Mackay-Steven	Free agent	Free	
18 January 2024	FW	Greg Stewart	(India) Mumbai City	Free	
20 January 2024	GK	(Australia) Mark Birighitti	Dundee United	Emergency loan	
24 January 2024	MF	(England) James Balagizi	(England) Liverpool	Loan	
1 February 2024	FW	(Netherlands) Kevin van Veen	(Netherlands) Groningen	Loan	

=== Transfers out ===
Date	Position	Name	Subsequent Club	Fee	Ref
3 June 2023	MF	Blair Alston	Partick Thistle	Free	
3 June 2023	DF	(Northern Ireland) Lee Hodson	(England) Eastleigh	Free	
3 June 2023	DF	(Australia) Dylan McGowan	Hamilton Academical	Free	
3 June 2023	MF	(Republic of Ireland) Alan Power	Greenock Morton	Free	
3 June 2023	FW	Scott Robinson	Partick Thistle	Free	
3 June 2023	DF	(England) Chris Stokes	(England) Morecambe	Free	
3 June 2023	DF	Calum Waters	Greenock Morton	Free	
3 June 2023	GK	(England) Sam Walker	(England) Charlton Athletic	Free	
16 June 2023	DF	(Wales) Ash Taylor	(England) Bradford City	Free	
24 June 2023	DF	Jon Craig	Clyde	Free	
11 July 2023	GK	Aiden Glavin	Auchinleck Talbot	Loan	
13 July 2023	FW	Cameron Mulvanny	Clyde	Free	
21 July 2023	MF	Kian Leslie	Clyde	Loan	
3 August 2023	MF	Kerr McInroy	Partick Thistle	Loan	
29 September 2023	FW	Bobby Wales	Alloa Athletic	Loan	
26 January 2024	DF	(England) Jack Sanders	Ayr United	Loan	
1 February 2024	GK	Corey Armour	Maybole Juniors	Loan	
13 February 2024	MF	Aaron Quigg	Albion Rovers	Loan	
29 February 2024	MF	Aaron Brown	Annan Athletic	Loan	
