= Lewis Mayo (footballer) =

Scottish footballer

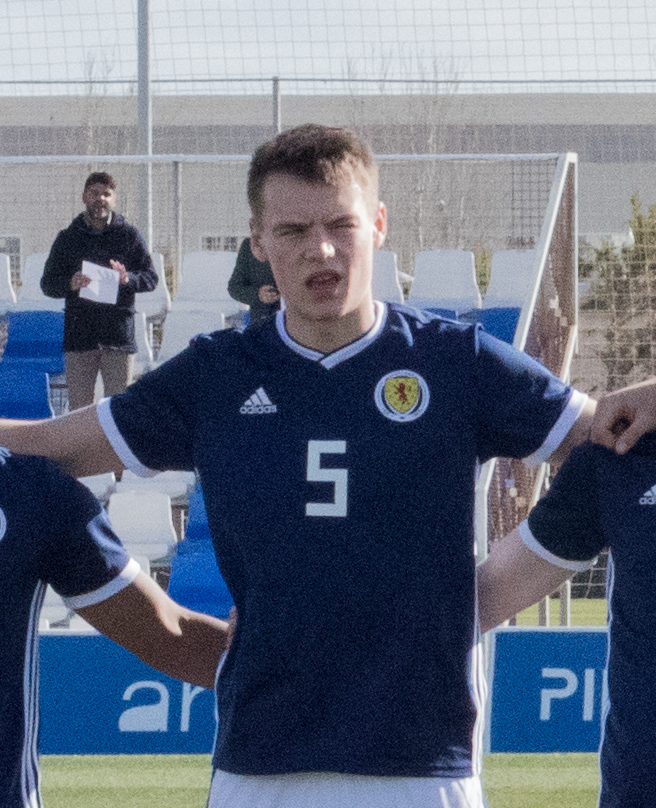
- Lewis in 2019

Personal information
- Full name: Lewis William Mayo
- Date of birth: 19 March 2000 (age 26)
- Place of birth: Lenzie, Scotland
- Height: 1.91 m (6 ft 3 in)
- Position: Defender

Team information
- Current team: Aberdeen
- Number: 23

Youth career
- 2006–2010: Rossvale
- 2010–2019: Rangers

Senior career*
Years	Team	Apps	(Gls)
2019–2023	Rangers	0	(0)
2020	→ Partick Thistle (loan)	3	(0)
2020–2021	→ Dunfermline Athletic (loan)	21	(0)
2021–2022	→ Partick Thistle (loan)	33	(1)
2022–2023	→ Kilmarnock (loan)	34	(0)
2023–2026	Kilmarnock	97	(1)
2026-	Aberdeen	7	(0)

International career
2017	Scotland U17	6	(0)
2019–2020	Scotland U19	7	(0)
2020	Scotland U21	11	(0)
- * Club domestic league appearances and goals as of 00:01, 9 November 2026 (UTC)

Lewis William Mayo (born 19 March 2000) is a Scottish professional footballer who plays as a defender for Scottish Premiership club Aberdeen.

Mayo began his career at Rangers and has previously had loan spells with Dunfermline Athletic, Partick Thistle and Kilmarnock.

== Early life ==
Mayo excelled as a student and attained straight As at High School.

== Career ==
A highly-promising graduate of the Rangers youth academy, of which he was a member since the age of 10, Mayo signed a three-year deal with the Ibrox club in October 2018 under the management of Steven Gerrard and academy manager Graeme Murty. Mayo is described as a versatile player, however primarily operates in defensive positions.

Mayo featured and scored for Rangers in a 5–0 pre-season win over Oxford United at Ibrox and has also played in three Scottish Challenge Cup games for Rangers Colts, making it to the competition's semi-final stage in 2020, after captaining the side for a 2–0 quarter-final win over Wrexham.

A Rangers fan since a young age, Mayo described the challenges of playing against players such as Jermain Defoe and Alfredo Morelos: "Jermain Defoe has been excellent as well because I play against him. He will tell me what I am doing well. It is hard and the thing is, it is either him or Alfredo Morelos in training, so you are not really getting a break. It is one or the other."

=== Loan moves ===
In the January 2020 transfer window, Mayo joined Scottish Championship side Partick Thistle on loan until the end of the season with the Maryhill side. Mayo made his debut in a 0–0 draw at home to Queen of the South, receiving a man of the match award for his performance. Due to the Coronavirus pandemic cutting short the season, Mayo's loan was ended early as he returned to Rangers after making 3 appearances for The Jags, with his game time being limited due to being injured upon signing.

Mayo moved on a season-long loan to Scottish Championship side Dunfermline Athletic in September 2020.

He was loaned to Partick Thistle for a second time in July 2021. Mayo scored his first Thistle and career goal, scoring the winner in a 1-0 win over Hamilton Academical.

In June 2022, Mayo joined newly promoted Kilmarnock on a season-long loan.

=== Kilmarnock ===
On 20 July 2023, Mayo joined Kilmarnock for an undisclosed fee, signing a three-year deal.

=== Aberdeen ===
On 28 May 2026, Mayo agreed to join Scottish Premiership club Aberdeen on a three-year deal.

== Career statistics ==
=== Club ===
As of match played 8 October 2023

Appearances by club, season and competition
Club	Season	League			National Cup		League Cup		Other		Total	
Club	Season	Division	Apps	Goals	Apps	Goals	Apps	Goals	Apps	Goals	Apps	Goals
Rangers B	2018–19	SPFL Reserve League	—		—		—		1 (Note: Appearances in Scottish Challenge Cup)	0	1	0
Rangers B	2019–20	SPFL Reserve League	—		—		—		3	0	3	0
Rangers B	Total		—		—		—		4	0	4	0
Partick Thistle (loan)	2019–20	Championship	3	0	0	0	0	0	0	0	3	0
Dunfermline (loan)	2020–21	Championship	22	0	1	0	2	0	1 (Note: Appearance in Scottish Premiership Promotion Play-offs)	0	26	0
Partick Thistle (loan)	2021–22	Championship	33	1	2	0	0	0	0	0	35	1
Kilmarnock (loan)	2022–23	Premiership	34	0	3	0	5	0	0	0	42	0
Kilmarnock	2023–24	Premiership	8	0	0	0	5	0	0	0	13	0
Career total			100	1	6	0	12	0	5	0	123	1
