= Daniel Phillips (footballer) =

Trinidad and Tobago footballer

Personal information
- Full name: Daniel Shaquille Jabari Phillips
- Date of birth: 18 January 2001 (age 25)
- Place of birth: Enfield, England
- Height: 1.75 m (5 ft 9 in)
- Position: Midfielder

Team information
- Current team: Stevenage
- Number: 8

Youth career
- 2011–2015: Chelsea
- 2015–2019: Watford

Senior career*
Years	Team	Apps	(Gls)
2019–2022	Watford	2	(0)
2019	→ Hemel Hempstead Town (loan)	5	(1)
2021–2022	→ Gillingham (loan)	24	(0)
2022–2024	St Johnstone	55	(0)
2024–	Stevenage	77	(1)

International career^{‡}
2021–	Trinidad and Tobago	30	(1)
- * Club domestic league appearances and goals as of 00:45, 15 July 2026 (UTC) ‡ National team caps and goals as of September 27, 2026

Daniel Shaquille Jabari Phillips (born 18 January 2001) is a professional footballer who plays as a midfielder for EFL League One club Stevenage. Born in England, he plays for the Trinidad and Tobago national team.

== Early and personal life ==
Born in Enfield, Phillips attended Enfield Grammar School. He is a second cousin of former footballer and fellow Trinidad and Tobago international Ian Cox.

== Club career ==
=== Watford ===
Phillips played in the Chelsea academy from the under-10 to under-14 age-groups. Following his release by Chelsea he joined Watford after a week-long trial. He signed a one-year professional contract in May 2019 at the end of his scholarship, with the option of a further year. In August 2019 Phillips joined National League South side Hemel Hempstead Town on loan until January 2020, but damaged ankle ligaments early in the season and was out for six months.

Phillips signed a one-year contract extension in June 2020. He made his Watford debut against Middlesbrough on 11 September as an 89th minute substitute for Domingos Quina. The match was Watford's first game in the Championship following relegation from the Premier League. He made his first club start on 15 September against Oxford United in the EFL Cup.

In July 2021, Phillips joined Gillingham on a season-long loan. He made his debut in a 1–1 draw at home to Lincoln City on 7 August 2021. Phillips was released by Watford at the end of the 2021–22 season.

=== St Johnstone ===
Phillips signed a two-year contract with Scottish Premiership club St Johnstone in August 2022.

=== Stevenage ===
On 4 July 2024, Phillips joined League One club Stevenage on a two-year deal.

== International career ==
Phillips is of Trinidadian descent and first expressed an interest in representing Trinidad and Tobago in 2019.

In March 2021, Phillips was called up by Trinidad and Tobago for the first time. He was named in their provisional squad for World Cup qualifiers later that month against Guyana and Puerto Rico. He made his debut on 25 March 2021 against Guyana.

In June 2023, Phillips was named to the 23-man squad for the 2023 CONCACAF Gold Cup. However, he would later pull out of the squad due to injury, and was replaced by Luke Singh.

== Career statistics ==
=== Club ===
As of end of 2025–26 season

Appearances and goals by club, season and competition
Club	Season	League			National cup (Note: Includes FA Cup, Scottish Cup)		League cup (Note: Includes EFL Cup, Scottish League Cup)		Other		Total	
Club	Season	Division	Apps	Goals	Apps	Goals	Apps	Goals	Apps	Goals	Apps	Goals
Watford	2019–20	Premier League	0	0	0	0	0	0	—		0	0
Watford	2020–21	Championship	2	0	1	0	2	0	—		5	0
Watford	2021–22	Premier League	0	0	0	0	0	0	—		0	0
Watford	Total		2	0	1	0	2	0	—		5	0
Hemel Hempstead Town (loan)	2019–20	National League South	5	1	0	0	—		0	0	5	1
Gillingham (loan)	2021–22	League One	24	0	1	0	1	1	1 (Note: Appearance(s) in EFL Trophy)	0	27	1
St Johnstone	2022–23	Scottish Premiership	22	0	1	0	0	0	—		23	0
St Johnstone	2023–24	Scottish Premiership	33	0	0	0	2	0	—		35	0
St Johnstone	Total		55	0	1	0	2	0	—		58	0
Stevenage	2024–25	League One	42	0	0	0	1	0	3	0	46	0
Stevenage	2025–26	League One	35	1	1	0	1	0	4 (Note: Two appearances in EFL Trophy; two appearances in League One play-offs)	0	41	1
Stevenage	2026–27	League One	0	0	0	0	0	0	0	0	0	0
Stevenage	Total		77	1	1	0	2	0	7	0	87	1
Career total			163	2	4	0	7	1	8	0	182	3

=== International ===
As of match played 27 September 2026

Scores and results list Trinidad and Tobago's goal tally first, score column indicates score after each Phillips goal.

List of international goals scored by Daniel Phillips
No.	Date	Venue	Opponent	Score	Result	Competition
1.	27 September 2026	Hasely Crawford Stadium, Port of Spain, Trinidad and Tobago	Dominican Republic	1–0	1–2	2026–27 CONCACAF Nations League A
