= Blair Spittal =

Scottish footballer (born 1995)

- Spittal in 2026

Personal information
- Full name: Blair Thomas Spittal
- Date of birth: 19 December 1995 (age 30)
- Place of birth: Erskine, Renfrewshire, Scotland
- Height: 6 ft 0 in (1.83 m)
- Position: Midfielder

Team information
- Current team: Heart of Midlothian
- Number: 16

Youth career
- 2008–2010: Rangers
- 2010–2012: Queen's Park

Senior career*
Years	Team	Apps	(Gls)
2012–2014	Queen's Park	52	(9)
2014–2017	Dundee United	82	(9)
2017–2019	Partick Thistle	69	(11)
2019–2022	Ross County	63	(8)
2020–2021	→ Partick Thistle (loan)	4	(1)
2022–2024	Motherwell	73	(15)
2024–	Heart of Midlothian	61	(6)
- * Club domestic league appearances and goals as of 5 September 2026

Blair Thomas Spittal (born 19 December 1995) is a Scottish footballer who plays as a midfielder for Scottish Premiership side Heart of Midlothian. He has previously played for Motherwell, Queen's Park, Dundee United, Partick Thistle and Ross County.

== Early life and career ==
Blair began playing for Erskine Boys Club and from there moved to Rangers. He spent two years there before joining Queen's Park's under-17 side. He attended Park Mains High School in Erskine.

== Club career ==
=== Queen's Park ===
At the age of 16 years old, Blair made his debut for Queen's Park away to Montrose on 17 November 2012. He went on to make a total of 18 appearances that season, scoring his only goal in a 5–3 win away to Elgin.

The following season, he established himself as a first team regular, making 41 appearances and scoring 12 goals in the process. This successful form saw him pursued by both of Dundee's Scottish Premiership clubs. Having agreed terms with both sides, he opted to join his ex-Queen's Park teammates Aidan Connolly and Andrew Robertson at Dundee United, over city rivals Dundee.

=== Dundee United ===
Having spent the first two games of the season as an unused substitute, Blair made his debut for the Terrors from the bench in the club's third game of the season away to Celtic on 16 August 2014. Blair played in the United squad that faced relegation from the Premiership in 2016. He was part of the side that won the 2016–17 Scottish Challenge Cup as he played in the earlier third and fourth rounds, as well as the quarter-final. However, he missed out on both the semi-finals and the final due to injury.

=== Partick Thistle ===
Blair joined Scottish Premiership club Partick Thistle on a two-year contract on 15 June 2017. He scored three goals in his first three games for the club, scoring a brace against St Mirren in the Scottish League Cup, including a free kick. He then scored in a 2–1 win away to Airdrieonians in the same competition. Blair marked his league debut for Partick Thistle with 3 assists against Aberdeen in a 4–3 defeat. In his second league appearance for the club, he scored his first league goal away to Ross County in a 1–1 draw. Blair continued his form the week after with a goal direct from a free kick and another assist as ten-man Thistle grabbed a 2–2 draw with Rangers at Firhill, taking his overall club tally to 7 appearances, 5 goals and 4 assists in all competitions. He then carried his form into the next league game by opening the scoring in a 1–1 draw with Hearts. He scored his fourth league goal of the campaign with another freekick, scoring the opener in a 3–2 home win against Motherwell. On 26 February 2019, in the absence of Partick Thistle's regular club captain Stuart Bannigan, Blair donned on the armband as the club travelled to East End Park to take on Dunfermline. They ended up losing the game 3–0. Blair again lead the team out in a home game against Hearts in the Scottish Cup quarter-final which ended in a 1–1 draw, meaning that there would be a replay in Edinburgh. Blair rounded off the season with a total of 8 goals in all competitions, and was awarded the club's Player of the Year award. Blair informed the club that he intended to leave on 31 May 2019. In all competitions, he made 89 appearances for the Jags, scoring 15 goals and registering 13 assists.

=== Ross County ===
On 4 June 2019, Blair signed for Ross County, agreeing a two-year contract. He made his club debut in the Scottish League cup at home to Montrose, providing an assist. Three days later, he scored his first goal for the club in a 4–0 away win to Brechin City. Just five days on, he bagged another assist in a 2–1 away win against the group favourites St. Johnstone. Ross County would finish top of their league cup group with the maximum twelve points and advance to round two. Blair would start his first Premiership game on the bench, but was subbed on after just 11 minutes to help his side defeat Hamilton 3–0.

=== Return to Partick Thistle ===
On 7 October 2020, Blair made a return to former club Partick Thistle who, at the time, were in League One, on a loan deal until January. Blair scored on his second debut for Partick Thistle just hours after he rejoined the club, scoring the equaliser in an eventual 4–1 defeat away to St. Mirren in their Scottish League Cup group stage. Blair scored his first league goal in his second spell for Thistle, scoring the winner in a 2–1 home win over Airdrieonians in the second league game of the season, with a fantastic curled shot into the top corner from outside the box. On 22 January 2021 Spittal was recalled to County following the suspension of the League one season.

=== Return to Ross County ===
Following his loan spell at Partick, Blair returned to Dingwall in January. From then and until the end of the season, he only made five appearances. Spittal became a first-team regular for the 2021–22 campaign and was given the number 7 shirt. On 17 May 2022 it was announced Spittal would leave Ross County at the end of his contract after three years having made 72 appearances for the club scoring 12 goals.

=== Motherwell ===
On 27 May 2022, it was announced that Spittal would join Motherwell on a two-year contract. Spittal scored his first Motherwell goal in a 3–2 away win against Aberdeen and would score six times in the 2022–23 season.

In the 2023–24 season Spittal would record a career high 13 goals finishing as Motherwell 2nd top goalscorer. He won his first Scottish Premiership Player of the Month award in February 2024, after scoring 4 and assisting 2 in 5 games.

=== Heart of Midlothian ===
On 21 March 2024, he agreed a pre-contract with Heart of Midlothian, officially signing for the club on 20 June 2024 on a three-year contract. On Sunday 26th April 2026, Blair scored the winning goal against Hibs.

== Career statistics ==
As of 5 September 2026

Appearances and goals by club, season and competition
Club	Season	League			Scottish Cup		League Cup		Other		Total	
Club	Season	Division	Apps	Goals	Apps	Goals	Apps	Goals	Apps	Goals	Apps	Goals
Queen's Park	2012–13	Scottish Third Division	16	1	0	0	0	0	2 (Note: Appearances in Scottish Second Division play-offs)	0	18	1
Queen's Park	2013–14	Scottish League Two	36	8	3	4	1	0	1 (Note: Appearance(s) in Scottish Challenge Cup)	0	41	12
Queen's Park	Total		52	9	3	4	1	0	3	0	59	13
Dundee United	2014–15	Scottish Premiership	25	2	2	0	3	0	—		30	2
Dundee United	2015–16	Scottish Premiership	33	5	4	1	2	1	—		39	7
Dundee United	2016–17	Scottish Championship	24	2	1	0	6	0	8 (Note: Three appearances in Scottish Challenge Cup, five appearances and three goals in Scottish Premiership play-offs)	3	39	5
Dundee United	Total		82	9	7	1	11	1	8	3	108	14
Partick Thistle	2017–18	Scottish Premiership	33	4	2	0	5	3	2 (Note: Appearances in Scottish Premiership play-offs)	0	42	7
Partick Thistle	2018–19	Scottish Championship	36	7	4	1	5	0	2	0	45	8
Partick Thistle	Total		69	11	6	1	10	3	4	0	87	15
Ross County	2019–20	Scottish Premiership	20	2	1	0	5	2	—		26	4
Ross County	2020–21	Scottish Premiership	9	1	0	0	0	0	–		9	1
Ross County	2021–22	Scottish Premiership	34	5	1	0	2	2	–		37	7
Ross County	Total		63	8	2	0	7	4	0	0	72	12
Partick Thistle (loan)	2020–21	Scottish League One	4	1	0	0	4	1	—		8	2
Motherwell	2023–23	Scottish Premiership	36	6	2	0	2	0	2	0	42	6
Motherwell	2023–24	Scottish Premiership	37	9	2	2	5	2	–		44	13
Motherwell	Total		73	15	4	2	7	2	2	0	86	19
Heart of Midlothian	2024–25	Scottish Premiership	34	4	4	0	1	0	8	2	47	6
Heart of Midlothian	2025–26	Scottish Premiership	23	2	1	0	3	0	–		27	2
Heart of Midlothian	2026–27	Scottish Premiership	4	0	0	0	1	0	6	0	11	0
Heart of Midlothian	Total		61	6	5	0	5	0	14	2	85	8
Career total			398	59	27	8	43	9	31	5	499	81

== Honours ==
=== Club ===
Dundee United

- Scottish Challenge Cup: 2016–17

=== Individual ===
- PFA Scotland Scottish League Two Team of the Year: 2013–14
- Scottish Premiership Player of the Month: February 2024
