= Davor Zdravkovski =

Macedonian footballer

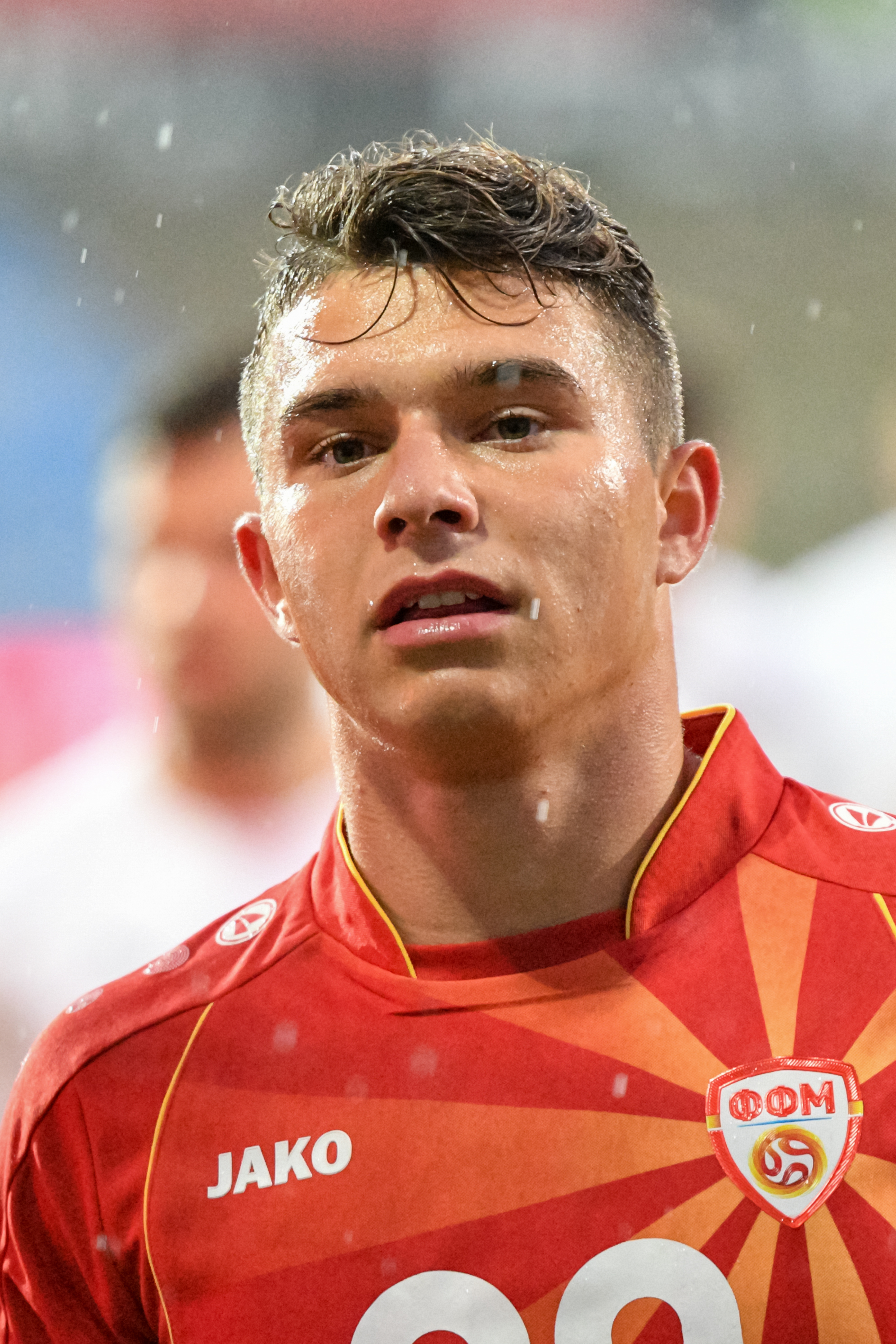
- Zdravkovski with Macedonia U21 in 2018

Personal information
- Full name: Davor Zdravkovski
- Date of birth: 20 March 1998 (age 28)
- Place of birth: Skopje, Macedonia
- Height: 1.75 m (5 ft 9 in)
- Position: Defensive midfielder

Team information
- Current team: AEL Limassol
- Number: 6

Senior career*
Years	Team	Apps	(Gls)
2015–2017	Makedonija	33	(1)
2017–2023	AEL Limassol	123	(1)
2023–2025	Motherwell	52	(1)
2025–	AEL Limassol	37	(0)

International career^{‡}
	Macedonia U17	1	(0)
2015–2016	Macedonia U19	7	(5)
2015–2020	Macedonia U21	27	(2)
- * Club domestic league appearances and goals as of 31 October 2026 ‡ National team caps and goals as of 17 November 2020

Davor Zdravkovski (Macedonian: Давор Здравковски; born 20 March 1998) is a Macedonian professional footballer who plays as a defensive midfielder for Cypriot First Division club AEL Limassol.

== Club career ==
Born in Skopje, Zdravkovski played in Macedonia for the youth team of Makedonija Gjorche Petrov, until the summer in 2015 when he made his first appearance for the senior team of the club, competing in the Macedonian Second League. At the end of the season, his club won promotion to the Macedonian First League where he remained regular in the starting squad throughout his entire first season in the top trier, being capped 33 times in 36 rounds.

In August 2017, he left Macedonia to join the Cypriot First Division club AEL Limassol, with whom he signed a three-year contract. Two months later, on 26 October 2017, he also made his debut for his new club by entering the game in the 63rd minute in the league game against Olympiakos Nicosia.

Zdravkovski joined Scottish Premiership club Motherwell in July 2023. On 16 June 2025, Motherwell confirmed that Zdravkovski had left the club after his contracts hadn't been renewed.

== International career ==
He has been a regular member of Macedonian U-19 and U-21 national teams.

In August 2023, he received his first call-up to the North Macedonia senior national team by head coach Blagoja Milevski, for two Euro 2024 qualifying matches against Italy and Malta.

== Career statistics ==
As of match played 18 May 2025

Appearances and goals by club, season and competition
Club	Season	League			National cup (Note: Includes Macedonian Football Cup, Cypriot Cup, Scottish Cup)		League cup (Note: Includes Scottish League Cup)		Continental		Other		Total	
Club	Season	Division	Apps	Goals	Apps	Goals	Apps	Goals	Apps	Goals	Apps	Goals	Apps	Goals
Makedonija	2016-17	Macedonian First League	33	1	1	0	—		—		—		34	1
AEL Limassol	2017-18	Cypriot First Division	6	0	0	0	—		0	0	—		6	0
AEL Limassol	2018-19	Cypriot First Division	23	0	4	0	—		—		—		27	0
AEL Limassol	2019-20	Cypriot First Division	19	0	4	0	—		2 (Note: Appearance(s) in UEFA Europa League)	0	0	0	25	0
AEL Limassol	2020-21	Cypriot First Division	28	1	5	0	—		—		—		33	1
AEL Limassol	2021-22	Cypriot First Division	26	0	4	0	—		4 (Note: Appearance(s) in UEFA Europa Conference League)	0	—		34	0
AEL Limassol	2022-23	Cypriot First Division	32	0	6	0	—		—		—		38	0
AEL Limassol	Total		134	1	23	0	—		6	0	0	0	163	1
Motherwell	2023-24	Scottish Premiership	27	1	2	0	2	0	—		—		31	1
Motherwell	2024-25	Scottish Premiership	25	0	0	0	6	0	—		—		31	0
Motherwell	Total		52	1	2	0	8	0	—		—		62	1
Career total			219	3	26	0	8	0	6	0	0	0	259	3
