= David Watson (footballer, born 2005) =

Scottish footballer (born 2005)

Personal information
- Full name: David Shankland Watson
- Date of birth: 12 February 2005 (age 21)
- Place of birth: Prestwick, Scotland
- Height: 1.78 m (5 ft 10 in)
- Position: Attacking midfielder

Team information
- Current team: Bolton Wanderers
- Number: 12

Youth career
- Caledonian
- 2015–2022: Kilmarnock

Senior career*
Years	Team	Apps	(Gls)
2021–2026	Kilmarnock	115	(12)
2026–	Bolton Wanderers	0	(0)

International career^{‡}
2023–2024	Scotland U19	10	(1)
2024–	Scotland U21	10	(1)
- * Club domestic league appearances and goals as of 20 May 2026 ‡ National team caps and goals as of 20:20, 29 April 2024 (UTC)

David Shankland Watson (born 12 February 2005) is a Scottish professional footballer who plays as an attacking midfielder for EFL Championship club Bolton Wanderers.

== Club career ==
=== Kilmarnock ===
Raised in Prestwick, South Ayrshire, where he attended Queen Margaret Academy, Watson trained with Kilmarnock from the age of seven and officially joined the club's youth system aged ten. He signed a two-year professional contract on 3 September 2021 and made his senior debut the following day as a late substitute in a Scottish Challenge Cup victory over Falkirk, but was not otherwise involved with the first team squad that season as Killie were promoted as winners of the Scottish Championship.

During the following season, he made early appearances in the Scottish League Cup but it was not until March 2023, shortly after turning 18, that he began to feature regularly in the Scottish Premiership, making his league debut under manager Derek McInnes at Ibrox Stadium against Rangers and starting eight of the last ten fixtures; his breakthrough coincided with an upturn in results (with the exception of a home defeat to St Johnstone in which Watson received a first half red card) and the club escaped relegation, finishing in 10th place. He agreed a new two-year contract in May 2023.

At the start of the 2023–24 season, Watson continued to feature in the starting lineup and was praised for his performances as Kilmarnock defeated both Rangers (in the Premiership) and Celtic (in the League Cup) by 1–0 scorelines at Rugby Park within the space of a fortnight. He scored his first Kilmarnock goal during a 3–1 loss to Celtic in a league match at Celtic Park and would manage to score four further goals in the league season. In November 2023, he signed a further extension to his deal until 2026 after more impressive performances for the first team. Kilmarnock finished fourth in the Premiership to qualify for the 2024–25 UEFA Europa League and Watson's contributions were recognised with Young Player of the Year awards from both the Writers' Association and the Footballers' Association.

On 25 July 2024 Watson scored his first European goal in a UEFA Europa League qualifier against Cercle Brugge with the game ending 1–1.

=== Bolton Wanderers ===
On 1 June 2026, it was confirmed he would join EFL Championship club Bolton Wanderers once the English transfer window opens on 15 June 2026, signing a three-year deal, with the option of a fourth, with Kilmarnock receiving an undisclosed compensation package.

== International career ==
Watson received his first call-up to the Scotland under-19 national team in August 2023. He made his debut for the under-21s in June 2024, with fellow highly-regarded midfielder Lennon Miller doing likewise.

== Personal life ==
Watson's mother Claire Houston was also a footballer, as well as a Scottish senior international. His younger brother Craig (born 2008) is also a footballer, and was on loan to Troon from Kilmarnock as of 2025.

== Career statistics ==
As of match played 29 August 2026

Appearances and goals by club, season and competition
Club	Season	League			National cup (Note: Includes Scottish Cup, FA Cup)		League cup (Note: Includes Scottish League Cup, EFL Cup)		Europe		Other (Note: Includes Scottish Challenge Cup)		Total	
Club	Season	Division	Apps	Goals	Apps	Goals	Apps	Goals	Apps	Goals	Apps	Goals	Apps	Goals
Kilmarnock	2021–22	Scottish Championship	0	0	0	0	0	0	—		1	0	1	0
Kilmarnock	2022–23	Scottish Premiership	10	0	0	0	2	0	—		3	0	15	0
Kilmarnock	2023–24	Scottish Premiership	36	5	3	0	6	0	—		0	0	45	5
Kilmarnock	2024–25	Scottish Premiership	35	4	1	0	1	0	5 (Note: One appearance and one goal in UEFA Europa League, four appearances in UEFA Conference League)	1	0	0	42	5
Kilmarnock	2025–26	Scottish Premiership	34	3	1	0	6	0	—		1	0	43	3
Kilmarnock	Total		115	12	5	0	15	0	5	1	5	0	145	13
Bolton Wanderers	2026–27	EFL Championship	1	0	0	0	1	0	—		—		2	0
Career total			116	12	5	0	16	0	5	1	5	0	147	13
