= 2011–12 Motherwell F.C. season =

Motherwell
2011–12 season
- Chairman: Vacant
- Manager: Stuart McCall
- Stadium: Fir Park
- Premier League: 3rd
- Scottish Cup: Quarter-finals vs Aberdeen
- League Cup: 3rd round vs Hibernian
- Top goalscorer: League: Michael Higdon (14); All: Michael Higdon (16)
- Highest home attendance: 10,440 v Celtic; 6 November 2011
- Lowest home attendance: 3,772 v Dunfermline; 24 January 2012
- Average home league attendance: 5,946
Home colours	Away colours

The 2011–12 season was Motherwell's thirteenth consecutive season in the Scottish Premier League, having competed in it since its inauguration in 1998–99. Motherwell finished 3rd in the league, qualifying for the UEFA Champions League, were knocked out of the Scottish Cup at the Quarter-Finals stage by Aberdeen, and knocked out at the 3rd Round stage by Hibernian in the League Cup.

== Season events ==
On 2 June, Motherwell announced that they had extended their contract with Shaun Hutchinson until the summer of 2014.

On 7 June, Motherwell announced that they had signed new one-year contract with Jamie Pollock, Ross McKinnon and Steven Howarth.

On 24 July, Motherwell announced that worldwide franchised retail network Cash Converters would be their new main sponsors.

- 2 August 2011 – Draw for the Scottish League Cup second round. Motherwell draw Clyde (away).
- 29 August 2011 – Draw for the Scottish League Cup third round. Motherwell draw Hibernian (home).
- 22 November 2011 – Draw for the Scottish Cup fourth round. Motherwell draw Queen's Park (home).
- 9 January 2012 – Draw for the Scottish Cup fifth round. Motherwell draw Greenock Morton (home).
- 10 January 2012 – Vice-Chairman Bill Dickie dies. Dickie was a Motherwell board member for over 30 years and was also the president of the SFA from 1993 to 1997.

On 2 February, Motherwell announced that they had signed a new two-and-a-half year contract with Henrik Ojamaa after his impressive start to his Motherwell career. The following day, 3 February, Motherwell announced that they had extended their contract with Stuart Carswell until the summer of 2014.

On 7 February, the Quarter-finals draw for the Scottish Cup took place, with Motherwell being drawn at home against Aberdeen.

On 25 May, Motherwell announced that they had extended their contract with Keith Lasley for another two season, keeping him at Motherwell until the summer of 2014.

On 30 May, Motherwell announced that they had extended their contract with Lee Hollis for another two season.

== Squad ==
As of match played 13 May 2012

No.	Name	Nationality	Position	Date of birth (age)	Signed from	Signed in	Contract ends	Apps.	Goals
Goalkeepers
1	Darren Randolph	(Republic of Ireland)	GK	12 May 1987 (aged 25)	Unattached	2010	2013	94	0
12	Lee Hollis	(Scotland)	GK	27 March 1986 (aged 26)	Unattached	2010	2014	2	0
31	Tom Bradley	(Wales)	GK	20 July 1992 (aged 19)	Academy	2011		0	0
Defenders
2	Steven Saunders	(Scotland)	DF	30 March 1991 (aged 21)	Academy	2008		73	2
3	Steven Hammell	(Scotland)	DF	18 February 1982 (aged 30)	Southend United	2008	2014	426	4
5	Stephen Craigan	(Northern Ireland)	DF	29 October 1976 (aged 35)	Partick Thistle	2003		357	10
15	Shaun Hutchinson	(England)	DF	23 November 1990 (aged 21)	Academy	2009	2014	68	7
20	Jonathan Page	(England)	DF	8 February 1990 (aged 22)	Portsmouth	2008	2012	24	3
22	Tim Clancy	(Republic of Ireland)	DF	8 June 1984 (aged 27)	Kilmarnock	2011	2012	30	0
23	Jordan Halsman	(Scotland)	DF	13 June 1991 (aged 20)	Academy	2010		1	0
39	Adam Cummins	(England)	DF	3 March 1993 (aged 19)	Everton	2011		1	0
	Zaine Francis-Angol	(England)	DF	30 June 1993 (aged 18)	Tottenham Hotspur	2011		0	0
Midfielders
4	Nicky Law	(England)	MF	29 March 1988 (aged 24)	Rotherham United	2011	2013	43	7
6	Tom Hateley	(England)	MF	12 September 1989 (aged 22)	Unattached	2009	2013	137	10
7	Chris Humphrey	(Jamaica)	MF	19 September 1987 (aged 24)	Unattached	2009	2012	124	6
8	Steve Jennings	(England)	MF	28 October 1984 (aged 27)	Unattached	2009	2012	113	3
14	Keith Lasley	(Scotland)	MF	21 September 1979 (aged 32)	Unattached	2006	2014	298	19
17	Omar Daley	(Jamaica)	MF	25 April 1981 (aged 31)	Unattached	2011	2013	27	3
18	Ross Forbes	(Scotland)	MF	3 March 1989 (aged 23)	Academy	2007	2012	77	10
26	Stuart Carswell	(Scotland)	MF	9 September 1993 (aged 18)	Academy	2011	2014	20	0
	Steven Hetherington	(England)	MF	9 March 1993 (aged 19)	Rangers	2011		0	0
	Hermann Mboa	(France)	MF	24 January 1993 (aged 19)	Racing Club de France	2011		0	0
Forwards
9	Michael Higdon	(England)	FW	2 September 1983 (aged 28)	Unattached	2011	2013	39	16
11	Jamie Murphy	(Scotland)	FW	28 August 1989 (aged 22)	Academy	2006	2013	186	39
16	Bob McHugh	(Scotland)	FW	16 July 1991 (aged 20)	Academy	2007		47	3
19	Gary Smith	(Scotland)	FW	28 May 1991 (aged 20)	Academy	2009		3	0
24	Henrik Ojamaa	(Estonia)	FW	20 May 1991 (aged 20)	RoPS	2012	2014	21	9
25	Steven Lawless	(Scotland)	FW	12 April 1991 (aged 21)	Academy	2009		2	1
Away on loan
21	Jamie Pollock	(Scotland)	MF	20 February 1992 (aged 20)	Academy	2009	2012	4	0
27	Ross McKinnon	(Scotland)	DF	9 October 1992 (aged 19)	Academy	2010	2012	0	0
	Nicky Devlin	(Scotland)	DF	17 October 1993 (aged 18)	Dumbarton	2011		0	0
Left during the season
24	Stephen Hughes	(Scotland)	MF	14 November 1982 (aged 29)	Unattached	2011	2012	77	3
	Steven Howarth	(Scotland)	FW	3 June 1992 (aged 19)	Clyde	2010	2012	0	0

== Transfers ==
=== In ===
Date	Position	Nationality	Name	From	Fee	Ref
3 March 2011 †	DF	(Scotland)	Nicky Devlin	Dumbarton	Free	
3 June 2011	FW	(England)	Michael Higdon	Unattached	Free	
1 July 2011	MF	(England)	Nicky Law	Rotherham	Free	
1 July 2011	DF	(England)	Adam Cummins	Everton	Free	
1 July 2011	MF	(England)	Steven Hetherington	Rangers	Free	
2 July 2011	DF	(Antigua and Barbuda)	Zaine Francis-Angol	Tottenham	Free	
24 August 2011	MF	(France)	Hermann Mboa	Racing Club de France	Free	
26 August 2011	DF	(Republic of Ireland)	Tim Clancy	Kilmarnock	Free	
12 September 2011	MF	(Jamaica)	Omar Daley	Unattached	Free	
16 November 2011	MF	(Scotland)	Stephen Hughes	Unattached	Free	
4 January 2012	FW	(Estonia)	Henrik Ojamaa	RoPS	Free	

† Devlin's transfer was announced on the above date but were not finalised until 1 July.

=== Loans out ===
Date from	Position	Nationality	Name	To	Date to	Ref.
30 August 2011	DF	(Scotland)	Ross McKinnon	Dumbarton	1 Month	
30 August 2011	FW	(Scotland)	Steven Howarth	Alloa Athletic	1 Month	
20 October 2011	MF	(Scotland)	Steven Lawless	Albion Rovers	1 Month	
20 October 2011	DF	(Scotland)	Ross McKinnon	Dumbarton	2 Months	
15 November 2011	MF	(Scotland)	Steven Lawless	Albion Rovers	2 Months	
20 January 2012	DF	(Scotland)	Jordan Halsman	Albion Rovers	2 Months	
20 January 2012	FW	(Scotland)	Gary Smith	Stenhousemuir	2 Months	
25 January 2012	DF	(Scotland)	Ross McKinnon	Alloa Athletic	5 Months	
21 February 2012	MF	(Scotland)	Jamie Pollock	Clyde	2 Months	
29 March 2012	DF	(Scotland)	Nicky Devlin	Stenhousemuir	2 Months	

=== Released ===
Date	Position	Nationality	Name	Joined	Date	Ref.
30 August 2011	DF	(Scotland)	Dean McLean			
3 January 2012	MF	(Scotland)	Stephen Hughes	Aberdeen	27 January 2012	
1 February 2012	FW	(Scotland)	Steven Howarth	Albion Rovers	2 August 2012	
11 May 2012	DF	(Northern Ireland)	Stephen Craigan	Retired		
11 May 2012	FW	(Scotland)	Gary Smith	Shettleston		
11 May 2012	GK	(Wales)	Tom Bradley			
11 May 2012	MF	(France)	Herman Mboa Megongo			
11 May 2012	DF	(Scotland)	Michael Lynch			
11 May 2012	DF	(Scotland)	Jordan Halsman	Greenock Morton	15 May 2012	
11 May 2012	MF	(Scotland)	Steven Lawless	Partick Thistle	1 June 2012	
11 May 2012	FW	(Scotland)	Keiran McGachie	Annan Athletic	21 June 2012	
11 May 2012	DF	(Scotland)	Ross McKinnon	SC Veendam	24 July 2012	
11 May 2012	DF	(Scotland)	Darren Brownlie	Ayr United	26 July 2012	
11 May 2012	MF	(Scotland)	Ross Forbes	Partick Thistle	5 September 2012	
11 May 2012	MF	(Scotland)	Jamie Pollock	East Fife	21 September 2012	
11 May 2012	DF	(Scotland)	Kieran MacDonald	Clyde	22 October 2012	
31 May 2012	GK	(Scotland)	Willie Muir	Celtic		
31 May 2012	DF	(Republic of Ireland)	Tim Clancy	Hibernian	21 June 2012	
31 May 2012	MF	(England)	Steve Jennings	Coventry City	16 August 2012	

== Friendlies ==
5 July 2011	Morton	2–3	Motherwell	Greenock
BST (UTC+1)	Graham 28'; Jackson 73'	Report	Murphy 34'; Pollock 51'; Smith 86'	Stadium: Cappielow

9 July 2011	Dumbarton	0–5	Motherwell	Dumbarton
BST (UTC+1)		Report	Murphy 8', 22'; Law 54'; McHugh 84'; Saunders 90'	Stadium: Strathclyde Homes Stadium; Attendance: 804

13 July 2011 Stephen Craigan Testimonial Match	Motherwell	1–0	Partick	Motherwell
BST (UTC+1)	Craigan 2' (pen.)	Report		Stadium: Fir Park; Attendance: 2,122

16 July 2011	Motherwell	1–2	Leeds United	Motherwell
BST (UTC+1)	Murphy 34'	Report	Bruce 68'; Núñez 75'	Stadium: Fir Park; Attendance: 4,798

17 January 2012	Motherwell	3–3	Fleetwood	Motherwell
BST (UTC+1)	Smith 75', 90'; McHugh 80'	Report	Seddon 22', 24'; Brodie	Stadium: Fir Park; Attendance: 0
Note: Match played behind closed-doors.

== Competitions ==
=== Overview ===
Competition	First match	Last match	Starting round	Final position	Record							
Competition	First match	Last match	Starting round	Final position	Pld	W	D	L	GF	GA	GD	Win %
Premier League	23 July 2011	13 May 2012	Matchday 1	3rd	38	18	8	12	49	44	+5	47.37
Scottish Cup	7 January 2012	11 March 2012	Fourth round	Quarter-final	3	2	0	1	11	2	+9	66.67
League Cup	24 August 2011	20 September 2011	Second round	Third round	2	1	1	0	6	2	+4	50.00
Total					43	21	9	13	66	48	+18	48.84

Last updated: 13 May 2012
Source: Soccerway

=== Premier League ===
==== League table ====
Pos	Team	Pld	W	D	L	GF	GA	GD	Pts	Qualification or relegation
1	Celtic (C)	38	30	3	5	84	21	+63	93	Qualification for the Champions League third qualifying round
2	Rangers (D, R)	38	26	5	7	77	28	+49	73	Refused SPL admission, accepted into the Third Division and disqualified from the Champions League third qualifying round (Note: Rangers were deducted 10 points for entering administration. As Rangers did not exit administration by 31 March, they were ineligible to compete in Europe in the 2012–13 season. Rangers were unable to agree a CVA with their creditors and the company entered proceedings to be liquidated. After a new company took over, Rangers were denied continued SPL membership and ended up in the 2012–13 Scottish Third Division in time for the start of the season.)
3	Motherwell	38	18	8	12	49	44	+5	62	Qualification for the Champions League third qualifying round
4	Dundee United	38	16	11	11	62	50	+12	59	Qualification for the Europa League third qualifying round
5	Heart of Midlothian	38	15	7	16	45	43	+2	52	Qualification for the Europa League play-off round (Note: Hearts qualified for the Europa League as 2011–12 Scottish Cup winners. Since they finished fifth in the league, the sixth-placed team, St Johnstone, also qualified for the Europa League.)

Source: SPFL Archive
Rules for classification: 1) points; 2) goal difference; 3) number of goals scored.
(C) Champions; (D) Disqualified; (R) Relegated

==== Results summary ====
Overall								Home						Away					
Pld	W	D	L	GF	GA	GD	Pts	W	D	L	GF	GA	GD	W	D	L	GF	GA	GD
38	18	8	12	48	44	+4	62	9	3	7	27	24	+3	9	5	5	21	20	+1

Source: BBC Sport

==== Results by round ====
Round	1	2	3	4	5	6	7	8	9	10	11	12	13	14	15	16	18	19	20	22	23	24	21	25	26	27	17	28	29	30	31	32	33	34	35	36	37	38
Ground	H	A	H	A	H	A	A	H	H	A	A	H	A	H	A	H	A	H	A	A	H	A	H	H	A	H	H	A	A	H	A	H	A	H	H	A	A	H
Result	W	D	W	W	L	W	L	L	W	W	W	D	W	L	W	D	W	D	L	L	L	D	W	W	D	W	W	L	W	W	L	L	D	L	W	W	D	L
Position	1	1	1	1	2	1	3	3	3	2	2	2	2	3	3	3	3	3	3	3	4	5	3	3	3	3	3	3	3	3	3	3	3	3	3	3	3	3

Source: BBC Sport
A = Away; H = Home; W = Win; D = Draw; L = Loss

==== Results ====
23 July 2011 1	Motherwell	3–0	Inverness Caledonian Thistle	Motherwell
15:00 BST (UTC+1)	Hammell 25'; Murphy 28'; Hutchinson (yellow card) 51'; Lasley (yellow card) 57' (goal) 77'; Jennings (yellow card) 68'	Report	Foran (yellow card) 72'	Stadium: Fir Park; Attendance: 4,190; Referee: Steven McLean

30 July 2011 2	Kilmarnock	0–0	Motherwell	Kilmarnock
15:00 BST (UTC+1)		Report		Stadium: Rugby Park; Attendance: 4,867; Referee: George Salmond

7 August 2011 3	Motherwell	1–0	Heart of Midlothian	Motherwell
15:00 BST (UTC+1)	Lasley (yellow card) 35' (yellow-red card) 87'; Murphy 60'	Report	Black (red card) 50'; Hamill (yellow card) 78'	Stadium: Fir Park; Attendance: 5,685; Referee: Stevie O'Reilly

13 August 2011 4	St Mirren	0–1	Motherwell	Paisley
15:00 BST (UTC+1)	Goodwin (yellow card) 50' van Zanten (yellow card) 54'	Report	Hutchinson (yellow card) 67'; Higdon (yellow card) 86'; Hateley 90'	Stadium: St Mirren Park; Attendance: 5,105; Referee: Iain Brines

21 August 2011 5	Motherwell	0–3	Rangers	Motherwell
14:15 BST (UTC+1)	Hutchinson (yellow card) 42'	Report	Naismith 20'; McMillan (yellow card) 43'; Lafferty 45' (yellow card) 73'; Wylde 85'	Stadium: Fir Park; Attendance: 10,092; Referee: Craig Thomson

27 August 2011 6	Dunfermline Athletic	2–4	Motherwell	Dunfermline
15:00 BST (UTC+1)	Burns (yellow card) 22'; Keddie (yellow card) 28'; Cardle 69', 88'	Report	Higdon 11', 90'; Murphy 26'; Humphrey 55'; Craigan (yellow card) 64'	Stadium: East End Park; Attendance: 4,462; Referee: Euan Norris

10 September 2011 7	Celtic	4–0	Motherwell	Glasgow
15:00 BST (UTC+1)	Forrest 9', 74'; Ledley 33'; Hooper (yellow card) 35'; Ki 67'	Report	Jennings (yellow card) 35'; Clancy (yellow card) 72'	Stadium: Celtic Park; Attendance: 48,793; Referee: Alan Muir

17 September 2011 8	Motherwell	0–3	St Johnstone	Motherwell
15:00 BST (UTC+1)		Report	Clancy 20' (o.g.); Adams (yellow card) 42'; Wright (yellow card) 58'; Sandaza 75'; Craig 85'	Stadium: Fir Park; Attendance: 4,336; Referee: Crawford Allan

24 September 2011 9	Motherwell	1–0	Aberdeen	Motherwell
15:00 BST (UTC+1)	Clancy (yellow card) 68'; McHugh 84'	Report	Pawlett (yellow card) 66'; Magennis (yellow card) 90'	Stadium: Fir Park; Attendance: 4,348; Referee: Alan Muir

1 October 2011 10	Dundee United	1–3	Motherwell	Dundee
15:00 BST (UTC+1)	Daly 77'	Report	Lasley 14'; Higdon 45+1', 64' (pen.)	Stadium: Tannadice; Attendance: 6,073; Referee: Steven McLean

15 October 2011 11	Hibernian	0–1	Motherwell	Edinburgh
15:00 BST (UTC+1)	O'Hanlon (yellow card) 43'; Murray (yellow card) 68'	Report	Murphy 8'; Hammell (yellow card) 64'	Stadium: Easter Road; Attendance: 8,518; Referee: Euan Norris

22 October 2011 12	Motherwell	0–0	Kilmarnock	Motherwell
12:45 BST (UTC+1)	Hammell (yellow card) 40'; Lasley (yellow card) 49'; Craigan (yellow card) 67'	Report	Kelly (yellow card) 85'	Stadium: Fir Park; Attendance: 4,184; Referee: Craig Thomson

29 October 2011 13	Inverness Caledonian Thistle	2–3	Motherwell	Inverness
15:00 BST (UTC+1)	Davis 4'; Meekings (yellow card) 25'; Shinnie 76'; Hogg (red card) 83'; Hayes (yellow card) 85'	Report	Murphy (yellow card) 22'; Randolph (yellow card) 25'; Hutchinson 39'; Forbes (yellow card) 58'; Lasley 77'; Hateley 87'	Stadium: Caledonian Stadium; Attendance: 3,188; Referee: Crawford Allan

6 November 2011 14	Motherwell	1–2	Celtic	Motherwell
12:00 GMT (UTC)	Higdon 11'; Lasley (yellow card) 28'; Jennings (yellow card) 45'; Clancy (red card) 83'	Report	Stokes 14' (yellow card) 53'; Hooper 80'	Stadium: Fir Park; Attendance: 10,440; Referee: Charlie Richmond

19 November 2011 15	Aberdeen	1–2	Motherwell	Aberdeen
15:00 GMT (UTC)	Vernon 10'	Report	Higdon 6'; Daley 53'	Stadium: Pittodrie; Attendance: 8,779; Referee: Calum Murray

26 November 2011 16	Motherwell	0–0	Dundee United	Motherwell
15:00 GMT (UTC)	Hutchinson (yellow card) 64'	Report		Stadium: Fir Park; Attendance: 4,487; Referee: Iain Brines

10 December 2011 18	St Johnstone	0–3	Motherwell	Perth
15:00 GMT (UTC)	Robertson (yellow card) 37'	Report	Daley 16'; Murphy 28', 68'; Lasley (yellow card) 57'	Stadium: McDiarmid Park; Attendance: 2,885; Referee: Alan Muir

17 December 2011 19	Motherwell	1–1	St Mirren	Motherwell
15:00 GMT (UTC)	Jennings (yellow card) 12'; Hutchinson (yellow card) 13'; Daley (yellow card) 37'; Higdon 48'; Lasley (yellow card) 53'; Murphy (yellow card) 73'	Report	Goodwin (yellow card) 12' (goal) 59'; McLean (yellow card) 90+1'	Stadium: Fir Park; Attendance: 4,557; Referee: Calum Murray

24 December 2011 20	Heart of Midlothian	2–0	Motherwell	Edinburgh
13:00 GMT (UTC)	Black 17'; Elliott 28'	Report	Higdon (yellow card) 38'; Hughes (yellow card) 64'	Stadium: Tynecastle Park; Attendance: 13,300; Referee: Crawford Allan

2 January 2012 22	Rangers	3–0	Motherwell	Glasgow
15:00 GMT (UTC)	Healy 35'; Aluko 55'; Edu (yellow card) 70'; Craigan 73' (o.g.)	Report	Hammell (yellow card) 48'	Stadium: Ibrox Stadium; Attendance: 9,063; Referee: Euan Norris

14 January 2012 23	Motherwell	0–1	Inverness Caledonian Thistle	Motherwell
15:00 GMT (UTC)		Report	Tadé 67'	Stadium: Fir Park; Attendance: 4,152; Referee: Steven McLean

21 January 2012 24	Dundee United	1–1	Motherwell	Dundee
15:00 GMT (UTC)	Craigan 28' (o.g.); Neilson (yellow card) 44'	Report	Craigan (yellow card) 62'; Higdon 85'	Stadium: Tannadice; Attendance: 5,969; Referee: Stevie O'Reilly

24 January 2012 21	Motherwell	3–1	Dunfermline Athletic	Motherwell
19:45 GMT (UTC)	Craigan (red card) 18'; Ojamaa 29' (yellow card) 40'; Clancy (yellow card) 32'; Law 52'; Higdon (yellow card) 75'; Humphrey 80'	Report	Barrowman (yellow card) 18'; Kirk 62'	Stadium: Fir Park; Attendance: 3,772; Referee: Alan Muir
Note: Match originally scheduled for 28 December, but re-arranged for 24 January due to high winds.

28 January 2012 25	Motherwell	3–2	St Johnstone	Motherwell
15:00 GMT (UTC)	Ojamaa 22', 65'; Clancy (yellow card) 36'; Lasley 75'	Report	Anderson (yellow card) 23'; Sandaza (yellow card) 38' (goal) 81' (pen.); Morris 45' (yellow card) 90+3'; M.Davidson (yellow card) 67'	Stadium: Fir Park; Attendance: 4,520; Referee: Calum Murray

11 February 2012 26	St Mirren	0–0	Motherwell	Paisley
15:00 GMT (UTC)	Goodwin (yellow card) 12'; Imrie (yellow card) 42'	Report	Jennings (yellow card) 65'; Hateley (yellow card) 68'; Higdon (yellow card) 82'; Clancy (yellow card) 90+1'	Stadium: St Mirren Park; Attendance: 4,204; Referee: Craig Charleston

18 February 2012 27	Motherwell	3–0	Heart of Midlothian	Motherwell
15:00 GMT (UTC)	Lasley (yellow card) 24' (yellow-red card) 51'; Webster 37' (o.g.); Murphy 41'; Law 64'; Ojamaa (yellow card) 87'; Hammell (yellow card) 89'	Report	Black (yellow card) 64'	Stadium: Fir Park; Attendance: 5,489; Referee: Alan Muir

22 February 2012 17	Motherwell	4–3	Hibernian	Motherwell
19:45 GMT (UTC)	Higdon 47' (pen.), 70', 75' (pen.); Ojamaa (yellow card) 54'; Murphy 63'; Clancy (yellow card) 68'	Report	Osbourne 18'; Doherty 66' (yellow card) 74'; Scott (yellow card) 72'; Sproule 85' (yellow card) 86'; Francomb (yellow card) 90+3'	Stadium: Fir Park; Attendance: 8,065; Referee: Steven McLean
Note: Match original scheduled for 2 December, but was abandoned after an electrical fire linked to the floodlights made it unsafe to continue the match.

25 February 2012 28	Celtic	1–0	Motherwell	Glasgow
15:00 GMT (UTC)	Hooper 59'; Wilson (yellow card) 74'	Report	Hutchinson (yellow card) 37'; Hateley (yellow card) 45'; Hammell (yellow card) 62'; Ojamaa (yellow card) 71'	Stadium: Celtic Park; Attendance: 53,486; Referee: Crawford Allan

3 March 2012 29	Dunfermline Athletic	0–2	Motherwell	Dunfermline
15:00 GMT (UTC)	McCann (yellow card) 69'	Report	Higdon (yellow card) 39' (goal) 64'; Hutchinson (yellow card) 53'; Ojamaa 70'	Stadium: East End Park; Attendance: 3,523; Referee: Euan Norris

17 March 2012 30	Motherwell	1–0	Aberdeen	Motherwell
15:00 GMT (UTC)	Hammell 22'; Page (yellow card) 65'; Hateley (yellow card) 74'	Report	Considine (yellow card) 16'; Robertson (yellow card) 51'; Árnason (yellow card) 74'; McArdle (yellow card) 90+3'	Stadium: Fir Park; Attendance: 4,637; Referee: Iain Brines

24 March 2012 31	Kilmarnock	2–0	Motherwell	Kilmarnock
15:00 GMT (UTC)	Heffernan 50', 62' (pen.); Hay (yellow card) 65'; Fowler (yellow card) 71'	Report	Jennings (yellow card) 70'; Carswell (yellow card) 78'; Hutchinson (yellow card) 87'	Stadium: Rugby Park; Attendance: 6,878; Referee: Crawford Allan

31 March 2012 32	Motherwell	1–2	Rangers	Motherwell
12:00 BST (UTC+1)	Ojamaa 6'; Clancy (yellow card) 14'; Lasley (yellow card) 45'	Report	Whittaker 9' (yellow card) 14'; Aluko (yellow card) 29'; Goian (yellow card) 74'; McCulloch 89'	Stadium: Fir Park; Attendance: 9,063; Referee: Iain Brines

8 April 2012 33	Hibernian	1–1	Motherwell	Edinburgh
12:30 BST (UTC+1)	O'Connor 30' (yellow card) 64'; Wotherspoon (yellow card) 90'	Report	Page (yellow card) 19' (yellow-red card) 90+2'; Humphrey (yellow card) 65'; Daley (yellow card) 77'; Law 81'	Stadium: Easter Road; Attendance: 7,110; Referee: Stevie O'Reilly

22 April 2012 34	Motherwell	0–3	Celtic	Motherwell
14:00 BST (UTC+1)		Report	Watt 63', 65'; Cha 83'	Stadium: Fir Park; Attendance: 8,760; Referee: Stevie O'Reilly

28 April 2012 35	Motherwell	5–1	St Johnstone	Motherwell
15:00 BST (UTC+1)	Higdon 17' (pen.); Law 20'; Murphy 52'; Ojamaa 83', 87'	Report	Anderson (yellow card) 16'; Craig 59' (pen.); M.Davidson (yellow card) 67'; Maybury (yellow card) 85'	Stadium: Fir Park; Attendance: 4,743; Referee: Bobby Madden

1 May 2012 36	Heart of Midlothian	0–1	Motherwell	Edinburgh
19:45 BST (UTC+1)		Report	Higdon 29'	Stadium: Tynecastle Park; Attendance: 9,185; Referee: Brian Winter

5 May 2012 37	Rangers	0–0	Motherwell	Glasgow
12:45 BST (UTC+1)	Ness (yellow card) 64'	Report	Hutchinson (yellow card) 75'	Stadium: Ibrox Stadium; Attendance: 45,962; Referee: Willie Collum

13 May 2012 38	Motherwell	0–2	Dundee United	Motherwell
12:30 BST (UTC+1)	Jennings (yellow card) 45'; Clancy (yellow card) 78'; Hateley[ (yellow card) 81'	Report	Russell 8'; Swanson (yellow card) 52'; Daly (yellow card) 78' (goal) 82'	Stadium: Fir Park; Attendance: 7,456; Referee: Euan Norris

=== Scottish Cup ===
7 January 2012 Fourth round	Motherwell	4–0	Queen's Park	Motherwell
15:00 GMT (UTC)	Daley 5'; Murphy 21', 71'; Forbes (yellow card) 41'; Page (yellow card) 45+1'; Ojamaa 90'	Report	Little (yellow card) 66'	Stadium: Fir Park; Attendance: 4,286; Referee: Kevin Clancy

4 February 2012 Fifth round	Motherwell	6–0	Greenock Morton	Motherwell
15:00 GMT (UTC)	Hateley 9'; Murphy 29', 67'; Hutchinson 9'; Ojamaa 35'; Law 41'	Report	Evans (yellow card) 35'; Young (yellow card) 47'	Stadium: Fir Park; Attendance: 5,139; Referee: Euan Norris

11 March 2012 Quarter-final	Motherwell	1–2	Aberdeen	Motherwell
15:45 GMT (UTC)	Page (yellow card) 60'; Lasley (red card) 70'; Law 79'	Report	Fallon 5', 40'; Robertson (yellow card) 76'	Stadium: Fir Park; Attendance: 7,640; Referee: Craig Thomson

=== League Cup ===
24 August 2011 Second Round	Clyde	0–4	Motherwell	Cumbernauld
19:45 BST (UTC+1)		Report	Higdon 17'; Hateley 41'; Law 51'; Lawless 85'	Stadium: Broadwood Stadium; Attendance: 1,778; Referee: Charlie Richmond

20 September 2011 Third Round	Motherwell	2–2 (6–7 p)	Hibernian	Motherwell
19:45 BST (UTC+1)	Lasley 30'; Higdon 40'	Report	O'Connor 19', 87' (yellow card) 66'	Stadium: Fir Park; Attendance: 3,909; Referee: Willie Collum
	Penalties
	Higdon (penalty scored); Murphy (penalty missed); Hateley (penalty scored); Forbes (penalty scored); McHugh (penalty scored); Clancy (penalty scored); Hammell (penalty scored); Law (penalty missed)		(penalty scored) O'Connor; (penalty scored) Pálsson; (penalty scored) Agogo; (penalty scored) Griffiths; (penalty missed) Booth; (penalty scored) O'Hanlon; (penalty scored) Wotherspoon; (penalty scored) Towell

== Squad statistics ==
=== Appearances ===
As of match played 13 May 2012

No.	Pos	Nat	Player	Total		Premier League		Scottish Cup		League Cup	
No.	Pos	Nat	Player	Apps	Goals	Apps	Goals	Apps	Goals	Apps	Goals
1	GK	(Republic of Ireland) IRL	Darren Randolph	42	0	38	0	3	0	1	0
2	DF	(Scotland) SCO	Steven Saunders	2	0	1+1	0	0	0	0	0
3	DF	(Scotland) SCO	Steven Hammell	42	2	38	2	3	0	1	0
4	MF	(England) ENG	Nicky Law	43	7	38	4	3	2	2	1
5	DF	(Northern Ireland) NIR	Stephen Craigan	28	0	24+2	0	1	0	1	0
6	MF	(England) ENG	Tom Hateley	43	4	38	2	3	1	2	1
7	MF	(Jamaica) JAM	Chris Humphrey	40	2	23+12	2	0+3	0	1+1	0
8	MF	(England) ENG	Steve Jennings	37	0	33+1	0	2	0	1	0
9	FW	(England) ENG	Michael Higdon	39	16	35	14	2	0	2	2
11	FW	(Scotland) SCO	Jamie Murphy	40	13	32+4	9	3	4	1	0
12	GK	(Scotland) SCO	Lee Hollis	1	0	0	0	0	0	1	0
14	MF	(Scotland) SCO	Keith Lasley	36	5	32	4	2	0	2	1
15	DF	(England) ENG	Shaun Hutchinson	34	2	30+1	1	2	1	1	0
16	FW	(Scotland) SCO	Bob McHugh	12	1	1+8	1	1	0	1+1	0
17	MF	(Jamaica) JAM	Omar Daley	27	3	11+14	2	1	1	0+1	0
18	MF	(Scotland) SCO	Ross Forbes	7	0	1+3	0	1	0	1+1	0
19	FW	(Scotland) SCO	Gary Smith	2	0	0+1	0	0	0	0+1	0
20	DF	(England) ENG	Jonathan Page	8	0	2+2	0	1+2	0	1	0
22	DF	(Republic of Ireland) IRL	Tim Clancy	30	0	24+2	0	3	0	1	0
23	DF	(Scotland) SCO	Jordan Halsman	1	0	0	0	0	0	1	0
24	FW	(Estonia) EST	Henrik Ojamaa	21	9	12+6	7	2+1	2	0	0
25	FW	(Scotland) SCO	Steven Lawless	2	1	0	0	0+1	0	1	1
26	MF	(Scotland) SCO	Stuart Carswell	16	0	4+10	0	0+1	0	0+1	0
39	DF	(England) ENG	Adam Cummins	1	0	1	0	0	0	0	0
Players away from the club on loan:
Players who left Motherwell during the season:
24	MF	(Scotland) SCO	Stephen Hughes	4	0	2+2	0	0	0	0	0

=== Goal scorers ===
As of match played 13 May 2012

Ranking	Nation	Position	Number	Name	Premier League	Scottish Cup	League Cup	Total
1	FW	(England)	9	Michael Higdon	14	0	2	16
2	FW	(Scotland)	11	Jamie Murphy	9	4	0	13
3	FW	(Estonia)	24	Henrik Ojamaa	7	2	0	9
4	MF	(England)	4	Nicky Law	4	2	1	7
5	MF	(Scotland)	14	Keith Lasley	4	0	1	5
6	DF	(England)	6	Tom Hateley	2	1	1	4
7	MF	(Jamaica)	17	Omar Daley	2	1	0	3
8	DF	(Scotland)	3	Steven Hammell	2	0	0	2
8	MF	(Jamaica)	7	Chris Humphrey	2	0	0	2
8	DF	(England)	15	Shaun Hutchinson	1	1	0	2
11	FW	(Scotland)	16	Bob McHugh	1	0	0	1
11	MF	(Scotland)	25	Steven Lawless	1	0	0	1
11				Own goal	1	0	0	1
TOTALS					48	11	6	65

=== Clean sheets ===
As of match played 13 May 2012

Ranking	Nation	Position	Number	Name	Premier League	Scottish Cup	League Cup	Total
1	GK	(Republic of Ireland)	1	Darren Randolph	15	2	0	17
2	GK	(Scotland)	12	Lee Hollis	0	0	1	1
TOTALS					15	2	1	18

=== Disciplinary record ===
As of match played 13 May 2012

Number	Nation	Position	Name	Premier League		Scottish Cup		League Cup		Total	
Number	Nation	Position	Name	Yellow card	Red card	Yellow card	Red card	Yellow card	Red card	Yellow card	Red card
3	(Scotland)	DF	Steven Hammell	6	0	0	0	0	0	6	0
5	(Northern Ireland)	DF	Stephen Craigan	3	1	0	0	0	0	3	1
6	(England)	DF	Tom Hateley	4	0	0	0	0	0	4	0
7	(Jamaica)	MF	Chris Humphrey	1	0	0	0	0	0	1	0
8	(England)	MF	Steve Jennings	7	0	0	0	0	0	7	0
9	(England)	FW	Michael Higdon	5	0	0	0	0	0	5	0
11	(Scotland)	FW	Jamie Murphy	2	0	0	0	0	0	2	0
14	(Scotland)	MF	Keith Lasley	8	2	0	1	0	0	8	3
15	(England)	DF	Shaun Hutchinson	9	0	0	0	0	0	9	0
17	(Jamaica)	MF	Omar Daley	2	0	0	0	0	0	2	0
18	(Scotland)	MF	Ross Forbes	1	0	1	0	0	0	2	0
20	(England)	DF	Jonathan Page	2	1	2	0	0	0	4	1
22	(Republic of Ireland)	DF	Tim Clancy	8	1	0	0	0	0	8	1
24	(Estonia)	FW	Henrik Ojamaa	4	0	0	0	0	0	4	0
26	(Scotland)	MF	Stuart Carswell	1	0	0	0	0	0	1	0
Players away from the club on loan::
Players who left Motherwell during the season:
24	(Scotland)	MF	Stephen Hughes	1	0	0	0	0	0	1	0
			TOTALS	64	5	3	1	0	0	67	6

=== Awards ===
==== Player of the Month ====
MONTH	Name	Award
October	(Scotland) Keith Lasley	Won

==== Manager of the Month ====
MONTH	Name	Award
July/August	(Scotland) Stuart McCall	Won
October	(Scotland) Stuart McCall	Won

==== Young player of the Month ====
MONTH	Name	Award
January	(Estonia) Henrik Ojamaa	Won

== See also ==
- List of Motherwell F.C. seasons
