= 2010–11 Motherwell F.C. season =

Motherwell
2010–11 season
- Chairman: John Boyle
- Manager: Craig Brown (until 9 December); Stuart McCall (from 30 December)
- Stadium: Fir Park
- Scottish Premier League: 6th
- Scottish Cup: Runners-Up
- League Cup: Semi-finals
- Europa League: Play-off round
- Top goalscorer: League: John Sutton; Nick Blackman (10); All: John Sutton (17)
- Highest home attendance: 10,092 v Rangers, 27 February 2011
- Lowest home attendance: 3,324 v Hearts, 14 December 2010
- Average home league attendance: 5,660
Home colours	Away colours

Motherwell competed in the Scottish Premier League, Scottish Cup, Scottish League Cup and UEFA Europa League during the 2010–11 season. This was the third consecutive season in which Motherwell had been involved in European competition, the first time this had happened in the club's 125-year history.

== Season events ==
- 21 June 2010 – Draw for the UEFA Europa League second qualifying round. Motherwell draw Icelandic side, Breiðablik.
- 16 July 2010 – Draw for the UEFA Europa League third qualifying round. Motherwell draw Norwegian side, Aalesund.
- 21 June 2010 – Draw for the UEFA Europa League play-off round. Motherwell draw Danish side, Odense.
- 11 August 2010 – The club announce a new year-long sponsorship deal with Scottish telecommunications firm, Commsworld.
- 31 August 2010 – Draw for the Scottish League Cup third round. Motherwell draw Brechin City (away).
- 23 September 2010 – Draw for the Scottish League Cup quarter finals. Motherwell draw Dundee United (home).
- 5 October 2010 – Motherwell appoint new Vice-Chairman, Derek Weir, and report a modest profit for the sixth time in seven years.
- 28 October 2010 – Draw for the Scottish League Cup semi finals. Motherwell draw Rangers (tie to be played at Hampden).
- 22 November 2010 – Draw for the Scottish Cup Fourth round. Motherwell draw Dundee (away).
- 9 December 2010 – Manager Craig Brown resigns.
- 30 December 2010 – Motherwell appoint Stuart McCall as their new manager on a 2 1/2-year deal.
- 11 January 2011 – Draw for the Scottish Cup Fifth round. Motherwell draw Stranraer (away).
- 19 January 2011 – Kenny Black is confirmed as the new assistant manager.

- On 20 January, Motherwell announced the loan signing of Mike Grella from Leeds United for the remainder of the season. The following day, 21 January, Motherwell confirmed that Grella's proposed loan move had been cancelled due to FIFA technicality which would not allow the club to register the player as he'd already played for two clubs during the 2010–11 season.

- 6 February 2011 – Draw for the Scottish Cup quarter finals. Motherwell draw Dundee United (away).
- 23 February 2011 – Chairman John Boyle announces that he will stand down as Motherwell chairman, and give up his shareholding for free. The club also consider switching to a wider form of ownership.
- 14 March 2011 – Draw for the Scottish Cup semi finals. Motherwell draw St Johnstone with the tie to be played at Hampden Park.
- 16 April 2011 – Motherwell defeat St Johnstone 3–0 at Hampden Park to progress to the 2011 Scottish Cup Final where they are to play Celtic, again at Hampden Park.
- 15 May 2011 – Motherwell finish their league campaign with a 4–0 defeat by Scottish Cup final opponents, Celtic, at Parkhead in their 52nd and penultimate competitive fixture of the season.
- 21 May 2011 – Motherwell finish their campaign with a 3–0 Scottish Cup final defeat against Celtic at Hampden Park.

== Squad ==
As of match played 21 May 2011

No.	Name	Nationality	Position	Date of birth (age)	Signed from	Signed in	Contract ends	Apps.	Goals
Goalkeepers
1	Darren Randolph	(Republic of Ireland)	GK	12 May 1987 (aged 24)	Unattached	2010	2013	52	0
12	Lee Hollis	(Scotland)	GK	27 March 1986 (aged 25)	Unattached	2010	2011	1	0
34	Tom Bradley	(Wales)	GK	20 July 1992 (aged 18)	Academy	2010		0	0
47	William Muir	(Scotland)	GK	16 March 1993 (aged 18)	Academy	2010		0	0
Defenders
2	Steven Saunders	(Scotland)	DF	30 March 1991 (aged 20)	Academy	2008	2013	71	2
3	Steven Hammell	(Scotland)	DF	18 February 1982 (aged 29)	Southend United	2008	2010	385	2
4	Maurice Ross	(Scotland)	DF	3 February 1981 (aged 30)	Unattached	2011	2011	6	0
5	Stephen Craigan (c)	(Northern Ireland)	DF	29 October 1976 (aged 34)	Partick Thistle	2003		346	10
19	Shaun Hutchinson	(England)	DF	23 November 1990 (aged 20)	Academy	2008		34	5
20	Jonathan Page	(England)	DF	8 February 1990 (aged 21)	Portsmouth	2008	2012	17	3
21	Angelis Charalambous	(Cyprus)	DF	31 May 1989 (aged 21)	Anorthosis Famagusta	2010	2011	0	0
22	Gavin Gunning	(Republic of Ireland)	DF	26 January 1991 (aged 20)	on loan from Blackburn Rovers	2011	2011	18	0
26	Peter Innes	(Scotland)	DF	26 April 1991 (aged 20)	Academy	2010		0	0
35	Liam Sloan	(Scotland)	DF	15 January 1992 (aged 19)	Academy	2010		0	0
36	Ross McKinnon	(Scotland)	DF	9 October 1992 (aged 18)	Academy	2010		0	0
37	Grant Brown	(England)	DF	10 April 1993 (aged 18)	Academy	2010		0	0
40	Kieran MacDonald	(Scotland)	DF	21 July 1993 (aged 17)	Academy	2010		0	0
44	Gavin Griffin	(Scotland)	DF	17 September 1993 (aged 17)	Academy	2010		0	0
46	Michael Lynch	(Scotland)	DF	14 March 1993 (aged 18)	Academy	2010		0	0
48	Euan Murray	(Scotland)	DF	20 January 1994 (aged 17)	Academy	2010		0	0
49	Dean McLean	(Scotland)	DF	13 July 1993 (aged 17)	Academy	2010		0	0
Midfielders
6	Tom Hateley	(England)	MF	12 September 1989 (aged 21)	Reading	2009	2013	94	6
7	Chris Humphrey	(Jamaica)	MF	19 September 1987 (aged 23)	Shrewsbury Town	2009	2013	84	4
8	Steve Jennings	(England)	MF	28 October 1984 (aged 26)	Tranmere Rovers	2009	2011	75	3
14	Keith Lasley	(Scotland)	MF	21 September 1979 (aged 31)	Unattached	2006		262	15
17	Steve Jones	(Northern Ireland)	MF	25 October 1976 (aged 34)	on loan from Walsall	2011	2011	17	2
18	Ross Forbes	(Scotland)	MF	3 March 1989 (aged 22)	Academy	2008		69	10
27	Steven Meechan	(Scotland)	MF	30 March 1991 (aged 20)	Academy	2009		4	0
32	Jamie Pollock	(Scotland)	MF	20 February 1992 (aged 19)	Academy	2009		5	0
38	Ryan Scanlon	(Scotland)	MF	25 September 1992 (aged 17)	Ross County	2009	2012	0	0
42	Stuart Carswell	(Scotland)	MF	9 September 1993 (aged 17)	Academy	2010		4	0
43	Chris Connor	(Scotland)	MF	4 August 1994 (aged 16)	Academy	2010		0	0
45	Bradley Halsman	(Scotland)	MF	12 April 1993 (aged 18)	Academy	2010		0	0
50	Josh Watt	(Scotland)	MF	31 August 1993 (aged 17)	Academy	2010		0	0
Forwards
9	Jamie Murphy	(Scotland)	FW	28 August 1989 (aged 21)	Academy	2006	2013	146	26
11	John Sutton	(England)	FW	26 December 1983 (aged 27)	Wycombe Wanderers	2008	2011	125	43
16	Bob McHugh	(Scotland)	FW	16 July 1991 (aged 19)	Academy	2007	2013	35	2
23	Esteban Casagolda	(Belgium)	FW	5 January 1987 (aged 24)	KRC Mechelen	2010	2011	13	0
24	Francis Jeffers	(England)	FW	25 January 1981 (aged 30)	Newcastle Jets	2011	2011	14	2
28	Steven Howarth	(Scotland)	FW	2 June 1992 (aged 18)	Clyde	2010	2012	0	0
33	Gary Smith	(Scotland)	FW	28 May 1991 (aged 19)	Queen's Park	2009		2	0
41	Lee Erwin	(Scotland)	FW	19 March 1994 (aged 17)	Academy	2010		0	0
Away on loan
	Steven Lawless	(Scotland)	MF	12 April 1991 (aged 20)	Academy	2009		0	0
Left during the season
4	Mark Reynolds	(Scotland)	DF	7 May 1987 (aged 24)	Academy	2004	2010	201	6
15	Michael Fraser	(Scotland)	GK	8 October 1983 (aged 27)	Inverness Caledonian Thistle	2009		9	0
17	Marc Fitzpatrick	(Scotland)	MF	11 May 1986 (aged 25)	Academy	2002	2010	143	5
22	Nick Blackman	(England)	FW	11 November 1989 (aged 21)	on loan from Blackburn Rovers	2010	2010	22	10
24	Alan Gow	(Scotland)	FW	9 October 1982 (aged 28)	Plymouth Argyle	2010	2011	17	2

== Transfers ==
=== In ===
Date	Position	Nationality	Name	From	Fee	Ref
7 June 2009	GK	(Scotland)	Lee Hollis	Unattached	Free	
10 June 2009	DF	(Cyprus)	Angelis Charalambous	Anorthosis Famagusta	Undisclosed	
1 July 2010	GK	(Republic of Ireland)	Darren Randolph	Charlton Athletic	Free	
12 August 2010	FW	(Belgium)	Esteban Casagolda	KRC Mechelen	Undisclosed	
31 August 2010	FW	(Scotland)	Steven Howarth	Clyde	Undisclosed	
1 September 2010	FW	(Scotland)	Alan Gow	Unattached	Free	
4 February 2011	FW	(England)	Francis Jeffers	Newcastle United Jets	Undisclosed	
1 April 2011	DF	(Scotland)	Maurice Ross	Unattached	Free	

=== Loans in ===
Date from	Position	Nationality	Name	From	Date to	Ref.
13 August 2010	FW	(England)	Nick Blackman	Blackburn Rovers	31 December 2010	
20 January 2011	MF	(Northern Ireland)	Steve Jones	Walsall	31 May 2011	
28 January 2011	DF	(Republic of Ireland)	Gavin Gunning	Blackburn Rovers	31 May 2011	

=== Out ===
Date	Position	Nationality	Name	To	Fee	Ref.
15 January 2011	DF	(Scotland)	Mark Reynolds	Sheffield Wednesday	Undisclosed	

=== Loans out ===
Date from	Position	Nationality	Name	To	Date to	Ref.
20 July 2010	DF	(Scotland)	Jordan Halsman	Annan Athletic	January 2011	
20 July 2010	MF	(Scotland)	Steven Lawless	Annan Athletic	30 August 2010	
4 August 2010	DF	(Scotland)	Dario Quinn	Linlithgow Rose	31 May 2011	
27 August 2010	FW	(Scotland)	Gary Smith	Dumbarton	January 2011	
31 August 2010	DF	(Scotland)	Peter Innes	Albion Rovers	31 May 2011	
31 August 2010	MF	(Scotland)	Steven Lawless	Albion Rovers	31 May 2011	
31 August 2010	MF	(Scotland)	Steven Meechan	Albion Rovers	31 May 2011	
28 January 2011	DF	(Scotland)	Jordan Halsman	Dumbarton	31 May 2011	

=== Released ===
Date	Position	Nationality	Name	Joined	Date	Ref.
31 July 2010	FW	(Scotland)	Mark Archdeacon	Brechin City		
31 August 2010	GK	(Scotland)	Michael Fraser	Montrose		
7 January 2011	FW	(Scotland)	Alan Gow	Notts County	15 January 2011	
13 January 2011	DF	(Scotland)	Marc Fitzpatrick	Ross County		
31 May 2011	DF	(Cyprus)	Angelis Charalambous	Ermis Aradippou		
31 May 2011	DF	(Scotland)	Gavin Griffin			
31 May 2011	DF	(Scotland)	Maurice Ross	Livingston	13 October 2011	
31 May 2011	DF	(Scotland)	Liam Sloan			
31 May 2011	MF	(Scotland)	Bradley Halsman			
31 May 2011	MF	(Scotland)	Steven Meechan	Kettering Town	26 July 2011	
31 May 2011	FW	(Belgium)	Esteban Casagolda	Union Saint-Gilloise	22 July 2012	
31 May 2011	FW	(England)	Francis Jeffers	Newcastle Jets	20 October 2011	

== Friendlies ==
Date	Opponent	H/A	Score	Motherwell Scorer(s)	Attendance	Report
6 July 2010	Brechin City	A	3–1	Sutton 48', Forbes 55', Lasley 66'	Unknown	Motherwell F.C.
8 July 2010	Forfar Athletic	A	2–1	Trialist 24', Reynolds 75'	Unknown	Motherwell F.C.
10 July 2010	Ayr United	A	2–1	Forbes 69', McHugh 89'	Unknown	Motherwell F.C.

== Competitions ==
=== Overall ===
Competition	Started round	Current position / round	Final position / round	First match	Last match
Scottish Premier League	—	—	6	5 August 2010	15 May 2011
League Cup	3rd Round	—	Semi-finals	21 September 2010	30 January 2011
Scottish Cup	4th Round	—	Final	9 January 2011	21 May 2011
UEFA Europa League	Second qualifying round	—	Play-off round	15 July 2010	26 August 2010

Source: Competitions

=== Premier League ===
==== Table ====
Pos	Team	Pld	W	D	L	GF	GA	GD	Pts	Qualification or relegation
4	Dundee United	38	17	10	11	55	50	+5	61	Qualification for the Europa League second qualifying round (Note: Celtic entered the play-off round of the 2011–12 UEFA Europa League as they won the 2011 Scottish Cup Final. Due to this, Heart of Midlothian also moved up to the third qualifying round, whilst fourth-placed team Dundee United received the second qualifying round spot.)
5	Kilmarnock	38	13	10	15	53	55	−2	49	
6	Motherwell	38	13	7	18	40	60	−20	46	
7	Inverness Caledonian Thistle	38	14	11	13	52	44	+8	53	
8	St Johnstone	38	11	11	16	23	43	−20	44	

Source: SPFL Archive
Rules for classification: 1) points; 2) goal difference; 3) number of goals scored.

==== Results summary ====
Overall								Home						Away					
Pld	W	D	L	GF	GA	GD	Pts	W	D	L	GF	GA	GD	W	D	L	GF	GA	GD
38	13	7	18	40	60	−20	46	8	3	8	24	24	0	5	4	10	16	36	−20

Source: BBC Sport

==== Results by round ====
Round	1	2	3	4	5	6	7	8	9	10	11	12	13	14	15	16	17	18	19	20	21	22	23	24	25	26	27	28	29	30	31	32	33	34	35	36	37	38
Ground	H	A	H	A	H	A	H	A	H	H	A	H	A	A	H	H	A	A	A	H	H	A	H	A	A	H	H	H	A	A	H	A	H	A	H	A	H	A
Result	L	W	L	W	D	W	W	L	W	L	W	W	L	D	L	L	L	D	L	D	W	L	L	L	W	W	L	W	L	L	W	D	W	D	L	L	D	L
Position	9	6	7	4	5	3	3	3	3	3	3	3	4	5	5	6	6	6	6	6	6	6	8	8	5	5	5	5	5	6	6	6	6	6	6	6	6	6

Source: BBC Sport
A = Away; H = Home; W = Win; D = Draw; L = Loss

==== Results ====
Match Day	Date	Opponent	H/A	Score	Motherwell Scorer(s)	League Position	Attendance	Report
1	15 August 2010	Hibernian	H	2–3	Sutton 13', Murphy 75' (pen.)	9	5,172	BBC Sport
2	22 August 2010	Kilmarnock	A	1–0	Blackman 37'	6	5,399	BBC Sport
3	29 August 2010	Celtic	H	0–1		7	9,207	BBC Sport
4	11 September 2010	St Johnstone	A	2–0	Blackman 3', Rutkiewicz 39' (og.)	4	3,254	BBC Sport
5	18 September 2010	Aberdeen	H	1–1	Murphy 35'	5	5,251	BBC Sport
6	25 September 2010	Hearts	A	2–0	Blackman 58', Sutton 70'	3	13,749	BBC Sport
7	2 October 2010	St Mirren	H	3–1	Humphrey 3', Hateley 87' (pen.), Murphy 88'	3	4,384	BBC Sport
8	16 October 2010	Rangers	A	1–4	Blackman 44'	3	44,609	BBC Sport
9	23 October 2010	Dundee United	H	2–1	Severin 1' (og.), Dillon 75' (og.)	3	4,635	BBC Sport
10	30 October 2010	Hamilton Academical	H	0–1		3	4,865	BBC Sport
11	6 November 2010	Inverness CT	A	2–1	Gow 33', Blackman 43'	3	4,054	BBC Sport
12	10 November 2010	St Johnstone	H	4–0	Blackman 12', 24', 45', Sutton 88'	3	3,361	BBC Sport
13	13 November 2010	Hibernian	A	1–2	Blackman 10' (pen.)	4	11,178	BBC Sport
14	20 November 2010	St Mirren	A	1–1	Blackman 74'	5	4,213	BBC Sport
15 (Re-arranged)	14 December 2010	Hearts	H	1–2	Lasley 45'	5	3,324	BBC Sport
19	26 December 2010	Rangers	H	1–4	Sutton 46'	6	9,371	BBC Sport
20	29 December 2010	Celtic	A	0–1		6	40,750	BBC Sport
21	1 January 2011	Hamilton Academical	A	0–0		6	3,171	BBC Sport
17 (Re-arranged)	12 January 2011	Dundee United	A	0–2		6	4,918	BBC Sport
22	15 January 2011	Inverness CT	H	0–0		6	3,728	BBC Sport
23	22 January 2011	Hibernian	H	2–0	Murphy 20', Saunders 24'	6	4,202	BBC Sport
24	26 January 2011	St Johnstone	A	0–1		6	2,268	BBC Sport
16 (Re-arranged)	2 February 2011	Kilmarnock	H	0–1		8	3,640	BBC Sport
26	12 February 2011	Rangers	A	0–6		8	43,789	BBC Sport
18 (Re-arranged)	15 February 2011	Aberdeen	A	2–1	Jeffers 14', Murphy 71'	5	6,882	BBC Sport
27	19 February 2011	Hamilton Academical	H	1–0	Sutton 36' (pen.)	5	4,407	BBC Sport
25 (Re-arranged)	23 February 2011	St Mirren	H	0–1		5	3,613	BBC Sport
28	27 February 2011	Celtic	H	2–0	Sutton 2', 49' (pen.)	5	9,716	BBC Sport
29	5 March 2011	Inverness CT	A	0–3		5	3,563	BBC Sport
30	19 March 2011	Kilmarnock	A	1–3	Sutton 12'	6	4,259	BBC Sport
31	2 April 2011	Aberdeen	H	2–1	Humphrey 15', Hutchinson 88'	6	4,458	BBC Sport
33 (Re-arranged)	6 April 2011	Dundee United	H	2–1	Murphy 26', Humphrey 41'	6	3,435	BBC Sport
32	9 April 2011	Hearts	A	0–0		6	13,800	BBC Sport
34	23 April 2011	Hearts	A	3–3	Sutton 55', 88', Hateley 58'	6	13,039	BBC Sport
35	30 April 2011	Rangers	H	0–5		6	8,968	BBC Sport
36	7 May 2011	Dundee United	A	0–4		6	5,951	BBC Sport
37	11 May 2011	Kilmarnock	H	1–1	Jones 8'	6	4,101	BBC Sport
38	15 May 2011	Celtic	A	0–4		6	57,837	BBC Sport

=== Scottish Cup ===
Date	Round	Opponent	H/A	Score	Motherwell Scorer(s)	Attendance	Report
9 January 2011	Fourth round	Dundee	A	4–0	Sutton 3', 47', Jennings 81', Murphy 87'	4,285	BBC Sport
5 February 2011	Fifth round	Stranraer	A	2–0	Jones 45', Sutton 82'	2,042	BBC Sport
13 March 2011	Quarter-final	Dundee United	A	2–2	Sutton 1', 72'	7,358	BBC Sport
30 March 2011	Quarter-final replay	Dundee United	H	3–0	Murphy 8', Humphrey 36', Jeffers 63'	8,337	BBC Sport
16 April 2011	Semi-final	St Johnstone	N	3–0	Craigan 5', Murphy 14', Sutton 39'	11,920	BBC Sport
21 May 2011	Final	Celtic	N	0–3		49,618	BBC Sport

=== League Cup ===
Date	Round	Opponent	H/A	Score	Motherwell Scorer(s)	Attendance	Report
21 September 2010	Third round	Brechin City	A	2–0	Page 16', 59'	903	BBC Sport
26 October 2010	Quarter-finals	Dundee United	H	1–0	Gow 86'	4,838	BBC Sport
30 January 2011	Semi-finals	Rangers	N	1–2	Lasley 66'	23,432	BBC Sport

=== UEFA Europa League ===
Date	Round	Opponent	H/A	Score	Motherwell Scorer(s)	Attendance	Report
15 July 2010	Second qualifying round	(Iceland) Breiðablik	H	1–0	Forbes 63'	5,990	BBC Sport
22 July 2010	Second qualifying round	(Iceland) Breiðablik	A	1–0	Murphy 42'	1,700	BBC Sport
29 July 2010	Third qualifying round	(Norway) Aalesund	A	1–1	Murphy 48'	8,450	BBC Sport
5 August 2010	Third qualifying round	(Norway) Aalesund	H	3–0	Murphy 4', Sutton 11', Page 89'	7,721	BBC Sport
19 August 2010	Play-off round	(Denmark) Odense	A	1–2	Hateley 90+4'	14,911	BBC Sport
26 August 2010	Play-off round	(Denmark) Odense	H	0–1		9,105	BBC Sport

== Squad statistics ==
=== Appearances ===
As of match played 21 May 2011

No.	Pos	Nat	Player	Total		Premier League		Scottish Cup		League Cup		Europa League	
No.	Pos	Nat	Player	Apps	Goals	Apps	Goals	Apps	Goals	Apps	Goals	Apps	Goals
1	GK	(Republic of Ireland) IRL	Darren Randolph	52	0	37	0	6	0	3	0	6	0
2	DF	(Scotland) SCO	Steven Saunders	36	1	22+3	1	2	0	3	0	5+1	0
3	DF	(Scotland) SCO	Steven Hammell	44	0	26+5	0	5	0	2	0	6	0
4	DF	(Scotland) SCO	Maurice Ross	6	0	5+1	0	0	0	0	0	0	0
5	DF	(Northern Ireland) NIR	Stephen Craigan	50	1	32+3	0	5+1	1	3	0	6	0
6	MF	(England) ENG	Tom Hateley	53	3	36+2	2	6	0	3	0	6	1
7	MF	(Jamaica) JAM	Chris Humphrey	51	4	33+3	3	5+1	1	3	0	4+2	0
8	MF	(England) ENG	Steve Jennings	42	1	30	0	4	1	2+1	0	5	0
9	FW	(Scotland) SCO	Jamie Murphy	49	12	31+4	6	5+1	3	2	0	6	3
11	FW	(England) ENG	John Sutton	50	17	25+10	10	6	6	1+2	0	6	1
12	GK	(Scotland) SCO	Lee Hollis	1	0	1	0	0	0	0	0	0	0
14	MF	(Scotland) SCO	Keith Lasley	40	2	26	1	6	0	2	1	6	0
16	FW	(Scotland) SCO	Bob McHugh	17	0	0+11	0	0+2	0	0+1	0	0+3	0
17	MF	(Northern Ireland) NIR	Steve Jones	17	2	10+2	1	1+3	1	0+1	0	0	0
18	MF	(Scotland) SCO	Ross Forbes	32	1	11+12	0	0+3	0	1+1	0	3+1	1
19	DF	(England) ENG	Shaun Hutchinson	24	1	17+1	1	5	0	1	0	0	0
20	DF	(England) ENG	Jonathan Page	14	3	3+6	0	0+1	0	1+1	2	0+2	1
22	DF	(Republic of Ireland) IRL	Gavin Gunning	18	0	12+2	0	4	0	0	0	0	0
23	FW	(Spain) ESP	Esteban Casagolda	13	0	3+9	0	0+1	0	0	0	0	0
24	FW	(England) ENG	Francis Jeffers	14	2	8+2	1	2+2	1	0	0	0	0
27	MF	(Scotland) SCO	Steven Meechan	2	0	0+2	0	0	0	0	0	0	0
32	MF	(Scotland) SCO	Jamie Pollock	4	0	0+3	0	0	0	0	0	0+1	0
33	FW	(Scotland) SCO	Gary Smith	2	0	0+1	0	0	0	0	0	0+1	0
42	MF	(Scotland) SCO	Stuart Carswell	4	0	3+1	0	0	0	0	0	0	0
Players away from the club on loan:
Players who left Motherwell during the season:
4	DF	(Scotland) SCO	Mark Reynolds	27	0	18	0	6	0	1	0	2	0
17	MF	(Scotland) SCO	Marc Fitzpatrick	7	0	3+2	0	0+1	0	1	0	0	0
22	FW	(England) ENG	Nick Blackman	22	10	15+3	10	1+1	0	0	0	2	0
24	FW	(Scotland) SCO	Alan Gow	17	2	9+6	1	0	0	0	0	2	1

=== Goal scorers ===
As of match played 21 May 2011

Ranking	Nation	Position	Number	Name	Premier League	Scottish Cup	League Cup	Europa League	Total
1	FW	(England)	11	John Sutton	10	6	0	1	17
2	FW	(Scotland)	9	Jamie Murphy	6	3	0	3	12
3	FW	(England)	22	Nick Blackman	10	0	0	0	10
4	MF	(Jamaica)	7	Chris Humphrey	3	1	0	0	4
5	MF	(England)	6	Tom Hateley	2	0	0	1	3
5	DF	(England)	20	Jonathan Page	0	0	2	1	3
5				Own goal	3	0	0	0	3
8	FW	(England)	24	Francis Jeffers	1	1	0	0	2
8	MF	(Northern Ireland)	17	Steve Jones	1	1	0	0	2
8	FW	(Scotland)	24	Alan Gow	1	0	1	0	2
8	MF	(Scotland)	14	Keith Lasley	1	0	1	0	2
12	DF	(England)	19	Shaun Hutchinson	1	0	0	0	1
12	DF	(Scotland)	2	Steven Saunders	1	0	0	0	1
12	DF	(Northern Ireland)	5	Stephen Craigan	0	1	0	0	1
12	MF	(England)	8	Steve Jennings	0	1	0	0	1
12	MF	(Scotland)	18	Ross Forbes	0	0	0	1	1
TOTALS					40	14	4	7	65

=== Clean sheets ===
Ranking	Position	Nation	Number	Name	Premier League	Scottish Cup	League Cup	Europa League	Total
1	GK	(Republic of Ireland)	1	Darren Randolph	10	4	2	3	19
				TOTALS	10	4	2	3	19

=== Disciplinary record ===
As of match played 21 May 2011

Nation	Position	Number	Name	Premier League		Scottish Cup		League Cup		Europa League		Total	
Nation	Position	Number	Name	Booked	Sent off (straight red)	Booked	Sent off (straight red)	Booked	Sent off (straight red)	Booked	Sent off (straight red)	Booked	Sent off (straight red)
(Republic of Ireland)	GK	1	Darren Randolph	1	0	1	0	0	0	0	0	2	0
(Scotland)	DF	2	Steven Saunders	6	1	0	0	0	0	2	0	8	1
(Scotland)	DF	3	Steven Hammell	0	0	0	0	0	0	1	0	1	0
(Scotland)	DF	4	Maurice Ross	1	0	0	0	0	0	0	0	1	0
(Northern Ireland)	DF	5	Stephen Craigan	8	0	1	0	1	0	1	0	11	0
(England)	MF	6	Tom Hateley	4	0	1	0	0	0	1	0	6	0
(Jamaica)	MF	7	Chris Humphrey	3	0	1	0	0	0	0	0	4	0
(England)	MF	8	Steve Jennings	9	1	3	0	1	0	1	1	14	2
(Scotland)	FW	9	Jamie Murphy	1	0	0	0	0	0	0	0	1	0
(England)	FW	11	John Sutton	2	0	0	0	0	0	0	0	2	0
(Scotland)	MF	14	Keith Lasley	7	0	1	0	0	0	2	0	10	0
(Northern Ireland)	MF	17	Steve Jones	1	0	0	0	0	0	0	0	1	0
(Scotland)	MF	18	Ross Forbes	6	0	0	0	0	0	0	0	6	0
(England)	DF	19	Shaun Hutchinson	3	0	1	0	0	0	0	0	4	0
(England)	DF	20	Jonathan Page	1	0	0	0	0	0	0	0	1	0
(Republic of Ireland)	MF	22	Gavin Gunning	5	0	1	0	0	0	0	0	6	0
(England)	FW	24	Francis Jeffers	2	0	0	0	0	0	0	0	2	0
(Scotland)	MF	42	Stuart Carswell	1	0	0	0	0	0	0	0	1	0
Players who left Motherwell during the season:
(Scotland)	DF	4	Mark Reynolds	2	0	0	0	0	0	1	0	3	0
(Scotland)	MF	17	Marc Fitzpatrick	0	0	0	0	0	0	1	0	1	0
(England)	FW	22	Nick Blackman	2	0	0	0	0	0	0	0	2	0
			TOTALS	65	2	10	0	2	0	10	1	87	3

== See also ==
- List of Motherwell F.C. seasons
