= Shaun Hutchinson =

English footballer (born 1990)

Personal information
- Full name: Shaun Matthew Hutchinson
- Date of birth: 23 November 1990 (age 35)
- Place of birth: Newcastle upon Tyne, England
- Height: 6 ft 1 in (1.85 m)
- Position: Centre back

Youth career
- –2007: Wallsend Boys Club
- 2007–2009: Motherwell

Senior career*
Years	Team	Apps	(Gls)
2009–2014	Motherwell	121	(7)
2014–2016	Fulham	34	(2)
2016–2025	Millwall	243	(13)
- * Club domestic league appearances and goals as of 04:41, 22 May 2025 (BST)

Shaun Matthew Hutchinson (born 23 November 1990) is an English professional footballer who most recently played for Millwall . He previously played for Motherwell and Fulham.

== Personal life ==
Hutchinson and his partner had their first child together, a daughter, two days before Christmas of 2016.

== Club career ==
=== Motherwell ===
Educated at Gosforth Academy, Hutchinson signed for Motherwell from Wallsend Boys Club in 2007. He later explained joining Motherwell, quoting: "Motherwell gave me the first offer after I left school and I was always going to take it." While growing up, Hutchinson revealed he and his family were Newcastle United supporters and were season ticket holders. Following his move to Motherwell, his family switched their allegiance from Newcastle United to Motherwell.

He made his professional debut for Motherwell on 16 May 2009 in a league match away to Hamilton Academical. He started in the 3–0 win. After making his debut, Hutchinson signed a new contract for two years.

Hutchinson played in the 2009–10 Europa League second leg match against Flamurtari on 23 July 2009 and scored the sixth goal in an 8–1 win for the Steelmen. Hutchinson made an impressive start of the season when he scored two goals in the first two matches against St Johnstone and Kilmarnock. As a result of his good performance, Hutchinson soon attracted interests from other clubs, but Manager Jim Gannon was determined for the youngsters to stay at the club. Despite the transfer speculation, Hutchinson signed a three-year contract with the club that would keep him until 2012. Hutchinson's third goal came in a 6–1 loss against Rangers on 19 December 2009, which turned out to be his last appearance of the season. However, during the season, Manager Gannon left the club and was replaced by Craig Brown. For Hutchinson, he suffered a huge setback in the first team, in that he only made five appearances in his first season for Motherwell. Hutchinson stated he want to get his career on track for "the sake of his sanity."

In the 2010–11 season, Hutchinson made a recovery from the hamstring injury and made appearances as an unused substitute in the matches, though he remained injured. Hutchinson was due to go on a one-month loan to Second Division team Ayr United in December 2010, to get match-sharpness. However, the bad weather and match postponements led to Motherwell being forced to call off the switch. Hutchinson forced his way back into the first team in the second half of the 2010–11 season, mainly due to the departure of first-choice centre back Mark Reynolds to Sheffield Wednesday. Hutchinson made his first appearance of the season when Mothewell and Inverness CT drew 0–0 on 16 January 2011. Hutchinson then scored his first goal of the season on 2 April 2011, in a 2–1 win over Aberdeen. After scoring his first goal of the season, Hutchinson said the goal against Aberdeen put a last laugh on Craig Brown after being overlooked by him the previous season and the start of the season. He helped Motherwell to the final of the 2011 Scottish Cup but they lost the match 3–0 against Celtic. Hutchinson revealed that he never expected to play in the final and couldn't stop smiling. On 2 June 2011, Hutchinson signed a two-year extension to his contract, tying him to Motherwell until 2014. Hutchinson was later grateful to Brown's successor Stuart McCall for giving a first team opportunity and fill in the boots of Reynolds.

In the 2011–12 season, Hutchinson played five games at the start of the season before suffering a Malleolar injury for four weeks when he sustained it during a match against Celtic and had to be substituted in the first half on 9 September 2011. Days later, it was announced that Hutchinson faced two months out. He made his return, in a match against Inverness CT, on 28 October 2011, where he scored and set up a goal for Keith Lasley, which was a win for Motherwell. Hutchinson became more regularly in the first team and then scored his second goal of the season, in the last 16 of Scottish Cup, in a 6–0 win over Greenock Morton. In May 2012, Hutchinson was awarded Young Player of the Month for April. Hutchinson would make thirty-three appearances in all competitions. Following the retirement of central-defense partner Stephen Craigan, Hutchinson began to realise he did not need Craigan around him, having grown up and taken responsibility. Hutchinson was also named in the Team of the Season by various journalists of the Daily Record.

In the 2012–13 season, Hutchinson faced a setback that could have prevented his playing in the Champions League after injuring his groin in the club's pre-season training and he feared he could be out of action for two months. Hutchinson made his return in a friendly match and then made his Champions League debut against Panathinaikos in the third qualifying round. Motherwell lost 3–0 on aggregate to go out of the competition, but entered the Europa League play-off round. During playing against Panathinaikos in both legs, Hutchinson was faulted for committing fouls in dangerous area and was penalised several times. Hutchinson played in the first leg against Spanish side Levante, but was sent off in the 77th minute "for hauling down Gekas on the edge of the box as he bore down on goal." The team were again eliminated after losing in the return leg. Two days later, Hutchinson was sent off for the second time in days after a second bookable offence, as Motherwell drew 1–1 with St Mirren. After the match, Manager McCall said the referee giving Hutchinson a second yellow card was wrong and it left him in tears. In the summer transfer window, Hutchinson was linked with a move to the Championship and McCall turned down a bid for him. Hutchinson scored his first goal of the season in a 3–3 draw against Aberdeen on 21 September 2012. In a 2–0 loss against Rangers in the Scottish Communities League Cup, Hutchinson made a direct clash with Francisco Sandaza, after which both players had blood streaming from their wounds, but Hutchinson returned to the pitch after treatment. Then in a 1–0 loss against Hearts on 21 October 2012, Hutchinson injured his hamstring and was later substituted. After the match, Hutchinson would be out for several weeks for his hamstring injury. Hutchinson made his return for the club on 18 November 2012, in a 5–1 loss against Inverness CT. Since his return, Hutchinson regained his first team place and said he was aiming for finishing second place. At the end of the 2012–13 season, together with teammates Darren Randolph, Nicky Law and Michael Higdon, Hutchinson was named in the 2012–13 PFA Scotland Team of the Year.

In the 2013–14 season, Hutchinson started his season when he was booked in both legs, as Motherwell lost 3–0 to Kuban Krasnodar on aggregate. In the opening game of the season, Hutchinson provided an assist for Henri Anier, in a 1–0 win over Hibernian. He then scored his first goal of the season, on 19 October 2013, in a 2–1 win over Hearts. A few weeks later, on 3 November 2013, Hutchinson was sent off after a second bookable offence in a 1–0 win over Hibernian. In a match against Aberdeen on 25 January 2014, Hutchinson was involved in a tackle on Ryan Jack after which Jack was stretchered off. This alerted Derek McInnes, suggesting that Hutchinson should have been sent off, describing the tackle as "a poor, reckless challenge." In the last game of the season, Hutchinson helped the club finish in second place after beating rival Aberdeen over second place.

With the expiry of his contract at Motherwell, Hutchinson stated he was happy at the club and was less affected by the transfer speculation. In October 2013, McCall made an urgent message for him to sign a new contract. Following a transfer speculation to Rangers, Manager McCall confirmed that Hutchinson would leave the club in the summer, but denied suggestion of Hutchinson joining Rangers. Despite the suggestion of his leaving in the summer, McCall, however, believed he would persuade Hutchinson to sign a new contract.

=== Fulham ===
On 16 June 2014, Hutchinson signed an initial two-year deal with Fulham with an option of a further year. Hutchinson made his debut for the club in the pre-season friendly on 5 July 2014, in a 2–0 win over East Fife Hutchinson also played against his former club, on 12 July 2014, in a 2–0 win for Fulham.

Hutchinson made his league debut for the club, in the opening game of the season, in a 2–1 loss to Ipswich Town before coming off in the 71st minute.

Hutchinson was to be released from his contract along with five other first team players at the end of June 2016. He signed for Millwall during pre-season 2016/17.

=== Millwall ===
Hutchinson signed for the Lions on 21 June 2016 following his release from Fulham, on a two-year deal. Hutchinson made his professional debut for the Lions on 16 August when Millwall took on Peterborough United at the ABAX Stadium as he came on for Shane Ferguson in the 77th minute but this debut was one for Hutchinson to forget as he went down before the game ended with a hamstring injury. In the 2016/2017, Hutchinson went on to score the winning goal and final league goal of the season against Bristol Rovers, in the Bristol Rovers 3–4 Millwall game, which allowed the team to get to the League One play-offs, which they won after a 1–0 win against Bradford City. Hutchinson scored the header in the 85th minute after a corner from Shane Ferguson. Even though Hutchinson had a head injury and no number on his shirt, he slotted the ball into the back of the net, securing the last play-off space for Millwall.

In 2018, Hutchinson signed another long-term contract with the Lions.

Hutchinson has since played on and off for the Lions picking up different injuries along the way. Since then Shaun Hutchinson has established himself as mainstay of the Millwall defence and a senior player within the squad, winning players awards and being part of the Championship team of the Year 19/20. He is known as an old school defender who is strong in the air and often puts his body on the line, much to the delight of the Millwall fans. Along with the other fan favourite, Hutchinson is known for his strong partnership with Jake Cooper.

On 19 May 2025, the club announced he would be leaving in June when his contract expired.

== International career ==
In 2009, Hutchinson was almost called up by the England under-21 team, but his chances were shattered, due to injury.

== Career statistics ==
As of match played 27 April 2024

Appearances and goals by club, season and competition
Club	Season	League			National Cup (Note: Includes Scottish Cup, FA Cup)		League Cup (Note: Includes Scottish League Cup, EFL Cup)		Europe		Other		Total	
Club	Season	Division	Apps	Goals	Apps	Goals	Apps	Goals	Apps	Goals	Apps	Goals	Apps	Goals
Motherwell	2008–09	Scottish Premier League	1	0	0	0	0	0	0	0	—		1	0
Motherwell	2009–10	Scottish Premier League	5	3	0	0	1	0	3 (Note: Appearances in UEFA Europa League)	1	—		9	4
Motherwell	2010–11	Scottish Premier League	19	1	5	0	1	0	0	0	—		25	1
Motherwell	2011–12	Scottish Premier League	30	1	2	1	1	0	0	0	—		33	2
Motherwell	2012–13	Scottish Premier League	31	1	1	0	1	0	3 (Note: Includes two appearances in UEFA Champions League and one appearance in UEFA Europa League)	0	—		36	1
Motherwell	2013–14	Scottish Premier League	35	1	1	0	2	0	2	0	—		40	1
Motherwell	Total		121	7	9	1	6	0	8	1	—		144	9
Fulham	2014–15	Championship	25	2	4	0	2	0	—		—		31	2
Fulham	2015–16	Championship	9	0	1	0	1	0	—		—		11	0
Fulham	Total		34	2	5	0	3	0	—		—		42	2
Millwall	2016–17	League One	16	2	2	0	0	0	—		4 (Note: One appearance in the Football League Trophy and three in the League One play-offs)	0	22	2
Millwall	2017–18	Championship	46	2	2	0	0	0	—		—		48	2
Millwall	2018–19	Championship	26	1	3	0	0	0	—		—		29	1
Millwall	2019–20	Championship	36	6	0	0	2	0	—		—		38	6
Millwall	2020–21	Championship	39	1	1	1	3	0	—		—		43	2
Millwall	2021–22	Championship	29	0	1	0	2	0	—		—		32	0
Millwall	2022–23	Championship	28	0	1	0	1	0	—		—		30	0
Millwall	2023–24	Championship	13	1	0	0	1	0	—		—		14	1
Millwall	Total		233	13	10	1	9	0	—		4	0	256	14
Career total			388	22	24	2	18	0	8	1	4	0	442	25

== Honours ==
Motherwell

- Scottish Cup runner-up: 2010–11

Millwall

- EFL League One play-offs: 2017

Individual

- Scottish Premier League Young Player of the Month: April 2012
