= Chris Humphrey =

Jamaican footballer (born 1987)

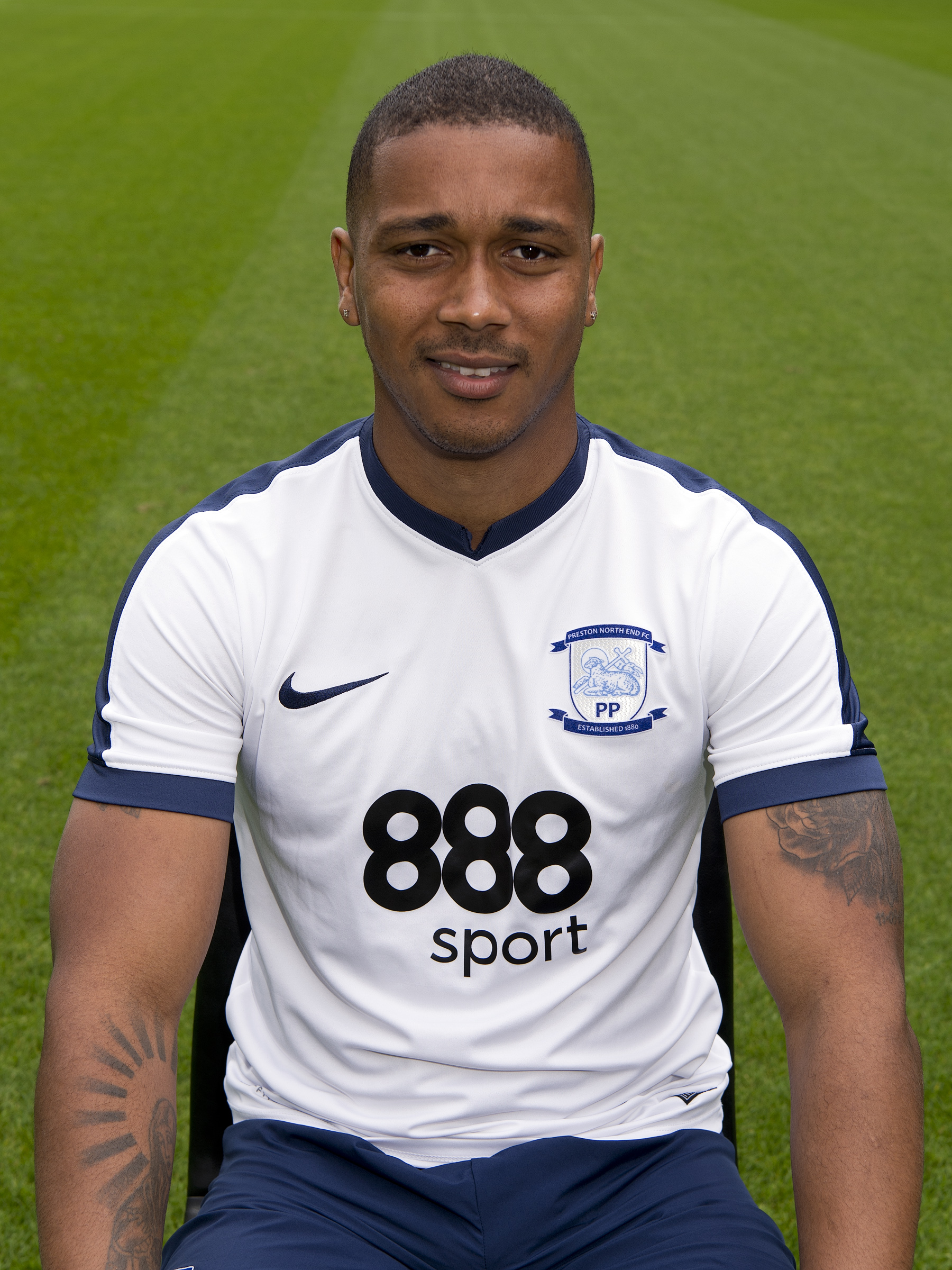
- Humphrey with Preston North End in 2016

Personal information
- Full name: Christopher Charles Humphrey
- Date of birth: 19 September 1987 (age 39)
- Place of birth: Saint Catherine, Jamaica
- Height: 5 ft 11 in (1.80 m)
- Positions: Winger; wing back

Team information
- Current team: Barnoldswick (assistant manager/player)

Youth career
- –2004: Walsall
- 2004–2006: West Bromwich Albion

Senior career*
Years	Team	Apps	(Gls)
2006–2009	Shrewsbury Town	74	(2)
2007	→ Stafford Rangers (loan)	4	(0)
2009–2013	Motherwell	132	(8)
2013–2016	Preston North End	106	(7)
2016–2017	Hibernian	6	(0)
2017–2018	Bury	10	(0)
2018	→ Barrow (loan)	1	(0)
2018–2019	East Kilbride		
2019	Gretna 2008		
2019–2020	Kelty Hearts		

International career^{‡}
2012–2015	Jamaica	12	(0)

Managerial career
- 2019: Gretna 2008
- 2020–2021: Kendal Town
- 2021-2022: Penrith A.F.C.
Medal record
Men's football
Representing Jamaica
CONCACAF Gold Cup
Runner-up	2015 United States–Canada	Team
- * Club domestic league appearances and goals as of 17:00, 24 September 2020 (UTC) ‡ National team caps and goals as of 19:37, 6 May 2017 (UTC)

Christopher Charles Humphrey (born 19 September 1987) is a Jamaican professional footballer and coach. He currently Manages Milnthorpe Corinthians FC in the West Lancashire Premier league. Humphrey has played for several clubs in the United Kingdom, including English clubs Shrewsbury Town, Preston North End and Bury, and Scottish clubs Motherwell and Hibernian. He also played for the Jamaica national team in 12 matches, having made his full international debut in 2012. Humphrey announced his retirement from football in October 2018, due to ongoing injury problems before returning to the game with East Kilbride. Humphrey took over as player/manager of Lowland League side Gretna 2008 but was sacked in November 2019.}

== Career ==
Born in Jamaica before moving to Walsall at the age of 5, Humphrey was at Walsall's Centre of Excellence until he joined West Bromwich Albion.

=== Shrewsbury Town ===
After playing in a reserve team match against Shrewsbury Town on 4 September 2006, Shrewsbury manager Gary Peters was impressed by Humphrey's performance and inquired about his availability, discovering that he was out of contract. Two days later Humphrey had signed for Shrewsbury on a free transfer until the end of the 2006–07 season, with Peters joking that he had kidnapped Humphrey.

Three days after signing, on 9 September, Humphrey made his debut as a 79th-minute substitute for Ben Herd in a 1–0 home defeat to Lincoln City. On 8 February 2007, and having made nine substitute appearances, Humphrey's progress had pleased Peters sufficiently to earn him a one-year contract extension until summer 2008.

In his first season, he made a total of 14 league appearances for Shrewsbury, all but one as a substitute. Humphrey played for Shrewsbury, as a late second-half substitute, in the 2007 Football League Two play-off final. Shrewsbury lost 3–1 to Bristol Rovers at Wembley. A mistake was made on his shirt, spelling his surname as "Humphery".

After making three league and three cup appearances in the early part of the 2007–08 season Humphrey joined Conference National side Stafford Rangers on 2 November 2007 on loan for a month, playing four games. On 25 January 2008, his contract was extended by another year, until the end of the 2008–09 season.

He scored his first goal on 25 October 2008, two minutes after coming on as a 78th-minute substitute for Shane Cansdell-Sherriff to earn Shrewsbury a 1–1 draw with Brentford at Griffin Park. Late in the January 2009 transfer window, and with Humphrey about to be out of contract in summer, it was claimed that he had attracted the interest of various clubs, including Aston Villa, following a number of eye-catching performances that season. On 2 May, Humphrey set up one goal and scored another as Shrewsbury beat Dagenham & Redbridge 2–1 to ensure the Shrews finished in seventh place in League Two, the fourth and final play-off spot.

On 23 May 2009, Humphrey played for Shrewsbury in the League Two play-off final at Wembley, which they lost 1–0 to Gillingham. Shortly after the play-off, Humphrey was offered a new contract by the club. On 25 June 2009, Sky Sports claimed that Shrewsbury had turned down a bid for Humphrey by Championship side Blackpool. On 3 July, Shrews manager Paul Simpson confirmed the Blackpool approach. The contract was soon stalled, as Humphrey was in favour of joining Scottish Premier League club Motherwell.

=== Motherwell ===
On 15 July 2009, Motherwell announced Humphrey as new manager Jim Gannon's second signing of the summer. Humphrey stated he was delighted to have made the move, hoping it would make him a better player. The chance to play in Europe was one of his main reasons for joining Motherwell.

On 23 July 2009, Humphrey made his debut for the club, starting in the second round of the Europa League in an 8–1 second leg win over Flamurtari Vlorë, giving Motherwell an 8–2 aggregate win. His league debut for the club came on the opening day of the season, as a half-time substitute, in a 2–2 draw against St Johnstone. In September 2009 after Humphrey and his partner suffered personal tragedy, Motherwell gave him several weeks' compassionate leave. On his return Humphrey was keen to show his gratitude to his manager and the club for the support they gave him. Shortly afterwards Humphrey picked up an injury that left him sidelined for several weeks. Having found it difficult to gain a regular place in the team, the January transfer window saw a number of English clubs linked with a loan move for Humphrey. Nothing came of the interest and Humphrey continued to be in and out of the team for the rest of the season.

After Jim O'Brien moved to Barnsley in 2010, Humphrey began to play more regularly for the first team. In the Europa League third round against Aalesunds FK, Humphrey played a key role, providing an assist in both legs helping Motherwell ease to the next round. Having begun to nail down a regular place in the team, Humphrey scored his first goal for Motherwell, just three minutes into a 3–1 win against St Mirren. On 28 January 2011, Humphrey was offered a one-year extension to his contract, an offer he was delighted to accept. A few months later, on 30 March 2011, he scored his second goal of the season, in a Scottish Cup quarter-final replay against Dundee United, which Motherwell won 3–0 to send the club through to the semi-final. Days later, he scored his third goal of the season, in a 2–1 win over Aberdeen. Having previously gone 28 games without scoring, Humphrey incredibly made it 3 goals in 3 games when he scored against Dundee United in a 2–1 league win. In the final of the Scottish Cup, Humphrey started as Motherwell lost 3–0 against Celtic. After the match, Humphrey stated his disappointment at the loss, but praised his teammates and the fans.

In the 2011–12 season, Humphrey continued to retain his first team place and scored his first goal of the season, in a 4–2 win over Dunfermline Athletic on 27 August 2011. During the season, Humphrey would again find himself linked with several English clubs. As with previous links, no move would materialise and Humphrey would once again see out the season with Motherwell. On 24 January 2012, he scored his second goal of the season, Dunfermline Athletic the victims again, in a 3–1 win for Motherwell. At the end of the season, Motherwell finished in third place. This gave the club qualification to the Champions League qualifying rounds, due to second placed Rangers being in administration, preventing them from taking part.

In the 2012–13 season, Humphrey would again play European football, featuring in a 2–0 loss against Greek side Panathinaikos in the first leg of the 2012–13 UEFA Champions League third qualifying round and in both legs of the 2012–13 UEFA Europa League play-off round against Spanish side Levante. In the summer transfer window, he was linked with a move to Celtic. The move however never materialised. On 27 November 2012, he scored his first goal of the season, a stunner, in a 2–1 win over Dundee United. Towards the end of the season, Humphrey's contract with the club was set to expire. He stated he would be happy to stay at the club. On 27 February 2013, Humphery scored again, this time against Celtic, helping to earn the club a 2–1 win. Motherwell would finish the season in second place in the league, qualifying for Europe again. On 12 May 2013, Humphrey scored and set up a goal for James McFadden, as Motherwell won 2–0 against Ross County. At the end of the season, Humphrey was offered a new contract with the club.

=== Preston North End ===
On 4 June 2013, it was announced that Humphrey would be leaving Motherwell to join Preston North End on a three-year contract. Humphrey said he had turned down an offer from Rangers to join Preston. Manager Craig Brown, who managed Humphrey during his time at Motherwell, told Evening Post that Humphrey will be a good signing for Preston.

Humphrey made his debut in the opening game of the season, where he made his first start, playing in the right wing position, as Preston drew 0–0 with Wolves. Three weeks later, on 25 August 2013, Humphrey scored his first goal for the club after coming on as a substitute in the second half, where he scored in injury time against Coventry City to make it 4–3 to Preston. However, a minute later, Coventry City scored another goal in injury time to make it 4–4. After the match, Humphrey said that he was happy to score his first goal, though disappointed with the results. He also scored in the following game, a 3–0 victory against Walsall. Humphrey immediately became a regular player in the Preston first team. On 8 March 2014 he scored his first goal of 2014, in a 3–1 win over Oldham Athletic. That goal was disputed as it was also claimed by teammate Keith Keane.

Humphrey continued to play regularly for Preston during 2013–14 and 2014–15, and the club gained promotion from League One to the Championship in the latter season. Humphrey featured less frequently in the team when it was in the Championship, and he left Preston North End on 30 December 2016 when his contract was terminated by mutual consent.

=== Hibernian ===
Humphrey returned to Scottish football on 31 December 2016, signing a contract with Championship club Hibernian until the end of the 2016–17 season. He made his first appearance for Hibs on 6 January, assisting the first two goals in a 3–0 win against Dundee United. Humphrey suffered a calf injury in a Scottish Cup tie with Hearts in February, which caused him to miss nine first team matches. Humphrey left Hibs at the end of the season and indicated that he was likely to return to English football.

=== Bury & Barrow Loan ===
Humphrey signed a one-year contract with Bury in June 2017. He was released by Bury at the end of the 2017–18 season. During his time at Bury he had a loan spell at Barrow AFC but only appeared the once.

Humphrey announced his retirement from football in October 2018, due to ongoing injury problems.

=== East Kilbride ===
Humphrey had a change of heart and came out of retirement to play for East Kilbride. EK went on to win the Lowland League during the 2018-19 season.

=== Gretna 2008 ===
Humphrey made his first step into management with Gretna 2008 but was sacked on 30 November 2019.

=== Kelty Hearts ===
Humphrey signed for Kelty Hearts as a player on 10 December 2019. Due to the COVID-19 pandemic, Kelty were declared Lowland League champions on 13 April 2020 on a points per game average based on the current standings.

=== Kendal Town ===
Humphrey was appointed as Kendal Town manager on 23 July 2020. He left the position on 21 October 2021 and joined Penrith A.F.C. in the Northern Football League, one division lower. He left Penrith in April 2022.

== International career ==
Impressive performances early in the 2010–11 season saw him linked with selection for the Scotland national football team. Humphrey would be eligible to play for Scotland because his mother was born in Kilmarnock. No call-up was forthcoming though. Humphrey was given a call-up to the Jamaica squad in 2011, but passport issues prevented him from playing. He was given another call-up a year later and made his debut in a 1–0 defeat to Panama. Humphrey made a second appearance against Panama, but was then dropped from the squad for breaking a curfew.

== Personal life ==
Humphrey was to become a father for the first time. However, the child died during birth. Following Motherwell's qualification to the Champions League in May 2012, he became a father again after his wife gave birth to a boy.

== Career statistics ==
=== Club ===
As of match played 4 February 2018

Appearances and goals by club, season and competition
Club	Season	League			FA Cup		League Cup		Europe		Other		Total	
Club	Season	Division	Apps	Goals	Apps	Goals	Apps	Goals	Apps	Goals	Apps	Goals	Apps	Goals
Shrewsbury Town	2006–07	League Two	12	0	0	0	0	0	—		5 (Note: Three appearances in Football League Trophy, two in League Two play-offs)	0	17	0
Shrewsbury Town	2007–08	League Two	25	0	0	0	2	0	—		1 (Note: Appearances in Football League Trophy)	0	28	0
Shrewsbury Town	2008–09	League Two	37	2	1	0	1	0	—		4 (Note: Two appearances in Football League Trophy, two in League Two play-offs)	0	43	2
Shrewsbury Town	Total		74	2	1	0	3	0	—		10	0	88	2
Stafford Rangers (loan)	2007–08	Conference Premier	4	0	0	0	—		—		0	0	4	0
Motherwell	2009–10	Scottish Premier League	28	0	1	0	1	0	3 (Note: Appearances in Europa League)	0	—		33	0
Motherwell	2010–11	Scottish Premier League	36	3	6	1	3	0	6	0	—		51	4
Motherwell	2011–12	Scottish Premier League	35	2	3	0	2	0	—		—		40	2
Motherwell	2012–13	Scottish Premier League	33	3	2	0	1	0	3 (Note: One appearance in Champions League, two in Europa League)	0	—		39	3
Motherwell	Total		132	8	12	1	7	0	12	0	—		163	9
Preston North End	2013–14	League One	42	3	4	0	2	0	—		2 (Note: Appearances in League One play-offs)	0	50	3
Preston North End	2014–15	League One	44	4	5	0	1	0	—		6 (Note: Two appearances in League One play-offs, four in Football League Trophy)	1	56	5
Preston North End	2015–16	Championship	10	0	0	0	3	0	—		—		13	0
Preston North End	2016–17	Championship	10	0	—		4	0	—		—		14	0
Preston North End	Total		106	7	9	0	10	0	—		8	1	133	8
Hibernian	2016–17	Scottish Championship	6	0	2	1	—		—		—		8	1
Bury	2017–18	League One	10	0	1	0	0	0	—		2	0	13	0
Career totals			332	17	25	2	20	0	12	0	20	1	409	20

=== International ===
As of match played 8 September 2015.

Appearances and goals by national team and year
National team	Year	Apps	Goals
Jamaica	2012	2	0
Jamaica	2013	1	0
Jamaica	2014	4	0
Jamaica	2015	5	0
Total		12	0

== Honours ==
Preston North End

- Football League One play-offs: 2015

East Kilbride

- Lowland League: 2018–19
- SFA South Region Challenge Cup: 2018–19

Kelty Hearts

- Lowland League: 2019–20
