= Tom Hateley =

Monegasque footballer

Personal information
- Full name: Thomas Nathan Hateley
- Date of birth: 12 September 1989 (age 37)
- Place of birth: Monte Carlo, Monaco
- Height: 1.81 m (5 ft 11 in)
- Position: Defensive midfielder

Senior career*
Years	Team	Apps	(Gls)
2006–2009	Reading	0	(0)
2008–2009	→ Basingstoke Town (loan)	10	(0)
2009–2013	Motherwell	148	(10)
2013–2014	Tranmere Rovers	8	(0)
2014–2016	Śląsk Wrocław	71	(1)
2016–2017	Dundee	27	(0)
2018–2020	Piast Gliwice	80	(6)
2020–2021	AEK Larnaca	32	(1)
2021–2024	Piast Gliwice	63	(0)
Total		439	(18)
- * Club domestic league appearances and goals

Thomas Nathan Hateley (born 12 September 1989) is an English-Monegasque former professional footballer who played as a defensive midfielder. He retired from professional football at the end of the 2023–24 season.

== Background ==
His father Mark played for many clubs including Coventry City, Portsmouth, A.C. Milan, Rangers and AS Monaco. Tom was born in Monaco.

His late grandfather, Tony, was also an English striker who played for many clubs including Notts County, Chelsea, Aston Villa, Birmingham City and Liverpool.

His father revealed in his Daily Record columns that he used to take Tom to Rangers dressing room before matches and used to warm up with goalkeeper Andy Goram when he was five years old. While growing up, Tom was a Rangers fan.

== Career ==
=== Reading ===
Hateley began his career at Reading, helping the reserve team to the national league title in the 2006–07 season. He was also the captain of the under-18 side during his time with the Royals. In the aftermath of the departure of Steve Coppell, he was one of several youngsters to be released by Reading in the summer of 2009. After being released by Reading, and after time at Basingstoke, Hateley had an extremely successful 4 years at Motherwell.

==== Loan to Basingstoke Town ====
In late 2008, he joined Basingstoke Town on loan until the end of the season and featured in an FA Cup match against Bury Town. He made fifteen appearances in all for the Hampshire club. During that season, he also had a trial at Hamilton Academical. He almost signed on loan, but Manager Billy Reid decided against bringing him in due to a short spell of ill health at the time of trial.

=== Motherwell ===
After being released by Reading, Hateley featured in a pre-season friendly for Basingstoke against Carshalton Athletic. He went on trial at Aldershot Town before being offered a trial with Scottish Premier League club Motherwell. Manager Jim Gannon offered the youngster a twelve-month deal with the option of a further year. He joined Motherwell on 13 August 2009, on a one-year contract. Set to start on the bench against St Johnstone, Hateley made his league debut unexpectedly as a late replacement for Paul Slane in a 2–2 draw. Hateley became an integral part of the Motherwell midfield during the 2009–10 season, offering additional defensive cover when required. He scored his first Motherwell goal with a free-kick against his father's former club Rangers in February 2010. After the match, Hateley said scoring against Rangers was the best goal of his career and that his dad even congratulated him. At the end of the season, he signed a new three-year contract, running until 2013.

In the 2010–11 season, Hateley made his European debut, in the first round first leg of the Europa League campaign, in a 1–0 win over Breiðablik. Then in the second leg, Hateley provided an assist for Jamie Murphy to send the club through to the next round. In the first leg of the play-off round, Hateley scored his first European goal, in a 2–1 loss against Danish side OB. After scoring his first European goal, Hateley described it as a "perfect moment". But in the second leg, Motherwell were eliminated after losing 1–0. Later in the season, Hateley scored twice in the league, against St Mirren and Hearts. Hateley was also in the starting line-up for the Scottish Cup final against Celtic, but Motherwell lost 3–0. After the match, he said the match had left him lost for words. At the conclusion of the 2010–11 season, Hateley had scored three goals in fifty-three appearances.

In the 2011–12 season, Hateley scored four goals in all competitions in forty-three appearances. In the 2012–13 season, Hateley made his Champions League debut, in a 3–0 loss against Greek side Panathinaikos. He played in both legs of the Champions League match. His contract talks with Motherwell soon broke down as he continued to be linked with many European clubs.

On 27 June 2013, Hateley left Motherwell after informing manager Stuart McCall that he would not return for pre-season training. This would end his four-year association with the club. In the summer transfer window, Hateley was linked a move back to Motherwell, something that was denied by McCall.

=== Tranmere Rovers ===
On 21 September 2013, Hateley moved to England by joining League One Tranmere Rovers on a 4-month contract.

He made his debut on the same day for the club in a 2–0 loss away at Notts County, he played the full 90 minutes whilst picking up a yellow card in the process. Four days later, he made his next appearance in the third round of the League Cup against Stoke City and despite losing 2–0, Hateley, along with three defenders, "delivered solid displays in defence". Hateley then played in central midfield, before a spell out of the team through injury.

After four months, Hateley left the club at the end of his contract.

=== Śląsk Wrocław ===
On 23 January 2014, Hateley left Tranmere Rovers to move abroad by joining Polish side Śląsk Wrocław on a two-and-a-half-year contract despite interest from Partick Thistle. Hateley had previously gone on trial with the club, which went successfully. Upon the move, he revealed his former Motherwell teammate Henrik Ojamaa had recommended he should move to Poland.

Hateley made his Ekstraklasa debut on 16 February 2014, in an away match against Lech Poznań.

=== Dundee ===
Hateley signed a two-year contract with Dundee on 5 September 2016. Before joining the club, he had also spoken to Partick Thistle and Hibernian.

On 31 August 2017, Hateley was released from his contract by mutual consent.

== Career statistics ==
Appearances and goals by club, season and competition
Club	Season	League			National cup (Note: Includes FA Cup, Scottish Cup, Polish Cup, Cypriot Cup)		League cup (Note: Includes Football League Cup, Scottish League Cup)		Europe		Other		Total	
Club	Season	Division	Apps	Goals	Apps	Goals	Apps	Goals	Apps	Goals	Apps	Goals	Apps	Goals
Reading	2006–07	Premier League	0	0	0	0	0	0	—		—		0	0
Reading	2007–08	Premier League	0	0	0	0	0	0	—		—		0	0
Reading	2008–09	Championship	0	0	0	0	0	0	—		—		0	0
Reading	Total		0	0	0	0	0	0	0	0	0	0	0	0
Basingstoke Town (loan)	2008–09	Conference South	10	0	1	0	—		–		4 (Note: Appearances in FA Trophy and Hampshire Senior Cup)	0	15	0
Motherwell	2009–10	Scottish Premier League	38	3	1	0	2	0	0	0	—		41	3
Motherwell	2010–11	Scottish Premier League	38	2	6	0	3	0	6 (Note: Appearances in UEFA Europa League)	1	—		53	3
Motherwell	2011–12	Scottish Premier League	38	2	3	1	2	1	—		—		43	4
Motherwell	2012–13	Scottish Premier League	34	3	2	0	1	0	3	0	—		40	3
Motherwell	Total		148	10	12	1	8	1	9	1	0	0	177	13
Tranmere Rovers	2013–14	League One	8	0	1	0	1	0	—		—		10	0
Śląsk Wrocław	2013–14	Ekstraklasa	12	0	0	0	—		—		—		12	0
Śląsk Wrocław	2014–15	Ekstraklasa	30	0	4	0	—		—		—		34	0
Śląsk Wrocław	2015–16	Ekstraklasa	29	1	2	0	—		4	0	—		35	1
Śląsk Wrocław	Total		71	1	6	0	—		4	0	—		81	1
Dundee	2016–17	Scottish Premiership	27	0	1	0	0	0	—		—		28	0
Dundee	2017–18	Scottish Premiership	0	0	0	0	0	0	—		—		0	0
Dundee	Total		27	0	1	0	0	0	—		—		28	0
Piast Gliwice	2017–18	Ekstraklasa	13	1	0	0	—		—		—		13	1
Piast Gliwice	2018–19	Ekstraklasa	34	4	0	0	—		—		—		34	4
Piast Gliwice	2019–20	Ekstraklasa	33	1	3	1	—		4 (Note: Two appearances in UEFA Champions League, two appearances in UEFA Europa League)	0	1 (Note: Appearance in Polish Super Cup)	0	41	2
Piast Gliwice	Total		80	6	3	1	—		4	0	1	0	88	7
AEK Larnaca	2020–21	Cypriot First Division	32	1	2	0	—		—		—		34	1
Piast Gliwice	2021–22	Ekstraklasa	23	0	1	0	—		—		—		24	0
Piast Gliwice	2022–23	Ekstraklasa	31	0	1	1	—		—		—		32	1
Piast Gliwice	2023–24	Ekstraklasa	9	0	1	0	—		—		—		10	0
Piast Gliwice	Total		63	0	3	1	—		—		—		66	1
Career total			439	18	29	3	9	1	17	1	5	0	499	23

== Honours ==
Piast Gliwice

- Ekstraklasa: 2018–19
