= Nicky Devlin =

Scottish footballer (born 1993)

Personal information
- Date of birth: 17 October 1993 (age 33)
- Place of birth: Bishopbriggs, Dunbartonshire, Scotland
- Height: 6 ft 0 in (1.83 m)
- Position: Right-back

Team information
- Current team: Aberdeen
- Number: 2

Youth career
- West Park United
- Hamilton Academical

Senior career*
Years	Team	Apps	(Gls)
2009–2011	Dumbarton	23	(0)
2011–2013	Motherwell	0	(0)
2012	→ Stenhousemuir (loan)	6	(0)
2012–2013	→ Dumbarton (loan)	16	(0)
2013	→ Stenhousemuir (loan)	8	(0)
2013–2014	Stenhousemuir	30	(0)
2014–2017	Ayr United	104	(3)
2017–2019	Walsall	76	(2)
2019–2023	Livingston	122	(6)
2023–	Aberdeen	97	(7)

International career^{‡}
2011	Scotland U19	2	(0)
2024–	Scotland	2	(0)
- * Club domestic league appearances and goals as of 20 May 2026 ‡ National team caps and goals as of 21:57, 15 October 2024 (UTC)

Nicky Devlin (born 17 October 1993) is a Scottish professional footballer who plays as a right-back for Scottish Premiership club Aberdeen and the Scotland national team.

He has previously played for Dumbarton, Motherwell, Stenhousemuir, Ayr United, Walsall and Livingston.

Devlin made his Scotland debut in 2024.

== Career ==
=== Motherwell ===
Devlin signed for Dumbarton in the summer of 2009, and broke into the first team during the 2010–11 season. Devlin signed a pre-contract agreement with SPL side Motherwell in March 2011. As part of the deal, Jordan Halsman's loan deal at Dumbarton was extended until the end of the season, and Motherwell played a pre-season friendly against Dumbarton. Devlin officially joined Motherwell on 1 July 2011. Devlin was injured for most of the 2011–12 season, but came back at the start of 2012 and turned in some excellent performances for the Motherwell under-19 team. On 29 March 2012, Devlin joined Stenhousemuir on loan until the end of the season where he was awarded the Young Player of the Month award for April, his first full month at the club.

On 17 August 2012, Devlin re-joined Dumbarton on loan until January 2013, which was subsequently extended for a further twenty-eight days. On 15 March 2013, Devlin was again farmed out on loan, re-joining Stenhousemuir till the end of the season. On 20 May 2013, after not making a single first-team appearance for Motherwell, Devlin was released by the club.

=== Stenhousemuir ===
Upon being released by Motherwell, he was quickly signed on a permanent contract by Stenhousemuir, who he had two previous loan spells with, for the 2013–14 season. At the end of the season, he was one of a number of players released by the club.

=== Ayr United ===
In July 2014, Devlin signed for Ayr United. He was made club captain on 19 May 2015. However, after the club's relegation from the Scottish Championship, Devlin announced he would be leaving Ayr in May 2017 at the end of his contract.

=== Walsall ===
Devlin signed for League One club Walsall in June 2017 on a two-year contract. He was offered a new contract by Walsall at the end of the 2018–19 season, however he opted to move back to Scotland.

=== Livingston ===
In June 2019, Devlin signed for Scottish Premiership side Livingston. Devlin played four seasons at Livingston, the latter two as team captain.

=== Aberdeen ===
Devlin confirmed on 22 May 2023 that he had agreed a deal to join fellow Premiership side Aberdeen.

Devlin won Premiership Player of the Month for October 2024, after the club went on an unbeaten run.

== International career ==
On 1 October 2024, he was called up by Scotland for the first time for UEFA Nations League matches against Croatia and Portugal. He made his debut as a substitute against Portugal at Hampden, making a crucial block late on in the game to deny Rafael Leão.

== Coaching career ==
In June 2020, Devlin agreed to join the under-20 coaching staff of West of Scotland Football League side Rossvale. David Gormley also brought him in to assist in first-team training sessions.

== Career statistics ==
As of matches played 3 December 2024

Appearances and goals by club, season and competition
Club	Season	League			National cup (Note: Includes Scottish Cup, FA Cup)		League cup (Note: Includes Scottish League Cup, EFL Cup)		Europe		Other		Total	
Club	Season	Division	Apps	Goals	Apps	Goals	Apps	Goals	Apps	Goals	Apps	Goals	Apps	Goals
Dumbarton	2010–11	Scottish Second Division	23	0	1	0	0	0	–		–		24	0
Motherwell	2011–12	Scottish Premier League	0	0	0	0	0	0	–		–		0	0
Motherwell	2012–13	Scottish Premier League	0	0	0	0	0	0	0	0	–		0	0
Motherwell	Total		0	0	0	0	0	0	0	0	0	0	0	0
Stenhousemuir (loan)	2011–12	Scottish Second Division	6	0	0	0	0	0	–		–		6	0
Dumbarton (loan)	2012–13	Scottish First Division	16	0	2	0	1	0	–		–		18	0
Stenhousemuir (loan)	2012–13	Scottish Second Division	8	0	0	0	0	0	–		–		8	0
Stenhousemuir	2013–14	Scottish League One	30	0	4	0	1	0	–		3 (Note: Appearances in Scottish Challenge Cup)	0	38	0
Ayr United	2014–15	Scottish League One	36	2	2	0	2	0	–		1	0	41	2
Ayr United	2015–16	Scottish League One	34	1	0	0	2	0	–		6 (Note: Two appearances in Scottish Challenge Cup, four in Scottish League One play-offs)	2	42	3
Ayr United	2016–17	Scottish Championship	34	0	6	0	5	0	–		3	0	48	0
Ayr United	Total		104	3	8	0	9	0	0	0	10	2	131	5
Walsall	2017–18	League One	33	0	0	0	1	0	–		2 (Note: Appearances in EFL Trophy)	0	36	0
Walsall	2018–19	League One	43	2	4	1	0	0	–		2	0	49	3
Walsall	Total		76	2	4	1	1	0	0	0	4	0	85	3
Livingston	2019–20	Scottish Premiership	11	0	0	0	5	0	–		–		16	0
Livingston	2020–21	Scottish Premiership	36	2	2	0	8	0	–		–		46	2
Livingston	2021–22	Scottish Premiership	37	2	2	0	2	0	–		–		41	2
Livingston	2022–23	Scottish Premiership	38	2	2	0	5	1	–		–		45	3
Livingston	Total		122	6	6	0	20	1	0	0	0	0	148	7
Aberdeen	2023–24	Scottish Premiership	37	2	3	1	4	0	8 (Note: Two appearances and one goal in UEFA Europa League, six appearances in UEFA Europa Conference League)	1	–		53	4
Aberdeen	2024–25	Scottish Premiership	15	4	0	0	7	2	–		–		22	5
Aberdeen	Total		44	4	3	1	10	1	8	1	0	0	75	9
Career total			438	17	29	2	44	2	8	1	17	2	534	24

== Honours ==
Aberdeen

- Scottish Cup: 2024–25
