= Steven Hammell =

Scottish footballer

Personal information
- Full name: Steven Hammell
- Date of birth: 18 February 1982 (age 44)
- Place of birth: Rutherglen, Scotland
- Height: 5 ft 9 in (1.75 m)
- Position: Left-back

Team information
- Current team: Celtic (Head of Academy Coaching)

Youth career
- Crosshouse Rovers
- 1997–1999: Motherwell
- → Bearsden B.C. (loan)

Senior career*
Years	Team	Apps	(Gls)
1999–2006	Motherwell	215	(2)
2006–2008	Southend United	55	(3)
2008–2018	Motherwell	282	(2)
Total		552	(7)

International career
2001–2004	Scotland U21	12	(1)
2004	Scotland	1	(0)
2006–2009	Scotland B	2	(0)

Managerial career
- 2022–2023: Motherwell
- * Club domestic league appearances and goals

Steven Hammell (born 18 February 1982) is a Scottish football coach and former player, who is the head of academy coaching at Celtic. Hammell played as a left-back in almost 500 league games across two spells with Motherwell, either side of a stint with Southend United. Hammell also played once for Scotland, in 2004. Hammell retired from playing in 2018. After a period as Motherwell's academy director, he became their manager in August 2022 but was sacked six months later.

== Career ==
=== Motherwell ===
Born in Glasgow, Hammell joined the youth system of Motherwell at the age of fifteen, after Alex McLeish and John Park came to his house and managed to persuade Hammell to take up football full-time. He was loaned out to Bearsden Boys Club, helping them win the league. Upon his return to Motherwell, he made his debut against Aberdeen at Pittodrie at the age of eighteen and thereafter became a regular in the side, making over 200 league appearances across seven campaigns.

=== Southend United ===
Hammell joined Southend United in July 2006 on a free transfer from Motherwell after his contract had expired – turning down more established sides such as Derby County, Southampton and Aberdeen. In 2005, Hammell was the subject of a £1m bid from Scottish Premier League Champions Celtic, however the move did not materialise.

Hammell came to speak to Southend manager Steve Tilson after a conversation with former Blues loanee Alan McCormack – also of Motherwell. Hammell praised Tilson and the set-up at Southend and after a nervous 48 hours wait whilst Hammell brought his girlfriend down to Essex to check out the area, he agreed to sign a two-year contract.

=== Return to Motherwell ===
Hammell rejoined Motherwell in the January 2008 transfer window on deadline day for a fee of £110,000, replacing Jim Paterson at left-back. Earlier in the day Paterson had left the club to join Plymouth Argyle and the proceeds from this transfer were used to buy Hammell.

On 18 May 2012, Hammell signed a two-year contract extension, keeping him at Fir Park until 2014. He would also be granted a testimonial. On 22 July 2012, Hammell played in his testimonial match for Motherwell against Everton, which finished 1–1.

On 26 April 2014, Hammell made his 500th appearance for Motherwell in a 5–1 loss against Dundee United. On 22 May 2014, he signed a new contract at Motherwell, keeping him at the club until Summer 2016.

After a freak groin injury kept Hammell sidelined for five months of the 2014–15 season, he made a timely return towards the end of season as the club were battling to avoid relegation. He eventually helped the club retain their Premiership status after Motherwell defeated Rangers by an aggregate scoreline of 6–1 in the Scottish Premiership play-off final.

On 5 January 2018, Motherwell announced that Hammell would retire at the end of the month to take up the role of the club's Academy Director.

Hammell is Motherwell's post-war record appearance holder. On 15 September 2021, it was announced that Hammell was to be inducted into the Motherwell F.C. Hall of Fame.

=== International career ===
Hammell was capped twelve times for Scotland U21s, scoring once in the process. Hammell was part of under-21 team that reached the play-offs for the 2004 UEFA European Championships. They were beaten 2–1 by Croatia U21s on aggregate.

On 17 November 2004, Hammell made his full international debut for Scotland under caretaker manager Tommy Burns in a 4–1 friendly defeat to Sweden, coming on as a 54th-minute substitute for Hearts centre-back Andy Webster. In May 2013, after a nine-year absence from international duty, Hammell was drafted in to the Scotland squad for their FIFA World Cup qualifier against Croatia following injury doubts over other full backs. In July 2013, Hammell managed to retain his place in the Scotland squad to face England at Wembley in August. Hammell received another late call up to the Scotland squad for the return fixture against Croatia in October 2013.

On 15 March 2006, Hammell played for the Scotland B team in the Futures Cup against the Turkey B team in a 3–2 defeat. On 6 May 2009, Hammell played a second time for the Scotland B team, in a 3–0 friendly win, this time against the Northern Ireland B team.

== Coaching career ==
After his retirement as a player, Hammell became the academy director of Motherwell. He was appointed their caretaker manager in July 2022, following the departure of Graham Alexander. He was announced as Alexander's permanent successor on 11 August 2022. Hammell was sacked by Motherwell on 11 February 2023, following a Scottish Cup defeat by Raith Rovers.

In June 2023, he became the head of academy coaching at Celtic.

== Career statistics ==
As of 24 January 2018

Appearances and goals by club, season and competition
Club	Season	League			National cup		League cup		Other		Total	
Club	Season	Division	Apps	Goals	Apps	Goals	Apps	Goals	Apps	Goals	Apps	Goals
Motherwell	1999–2000	Scottish Premier League	4	0	0	0	0	0	0	0	4	0
Motherwell	2000–01	Scottish Premier League	34	0	2	0	2	0	0	0	38	0
Motherwell	2001–02	Scottish Premier League	38	1	1	0	1	0	0	0	40	1
Motherwell	2002–03	Scottish Premier League	37	0	4	0	2	0	0	0	43	0
Motherwell	2003–04	Scottish Premier League	37	1	3	0	1	0	0	0	41	1
Motherwell	2004–05	Scottish Premier League	32	0	1	0	5	0	0	0	38	0
Motherwell	2005–06	Scottish Premier League	33	0	1	0	4	0	0	0	38	0
Motherwell	Total		215	2	12	0	15	0	0	0	242	2
Southend United	2006–07	Championship	39	1	3	0	5	1	0	0	47	2
Southend United	2007–08	League One	16	2	4	0	0	0	0	0	20	2
Southend United	Total		55	3	7	0	5	1	0	0	67	4
Motherwell	2007–08	Scottish Premier League	15	0	1	0	0	0	0	0	16	0
Motherwell	2008–09	Scottish Premier League	37	0	3	0	1	0	2 (Note: Appearances in the Europa League)	0	43	0
Motherwell	2009–10	Scottish Premier League	33	0	1	0	1	0	5	0	40	0
Motherwell	2010–11	Scottish Premier League	31	0	5	0	2	0	6	0	44	0
Motherwell	2011–12	Scottish Premier League	37	2	3	0	1	0	0	0	41	2
Motherwell	2012–13	Scottish Premier League	31	0	2	0	1	0	4 (Note: Two appearances in the Champions League and two in the Europa League)	0	38	0
Motherwell	2013–14	Scottish Premiership	34	0	1	0	2	0	2	0	39	0
Motherwell	2014–15	Scottish Premiership	8	0	0	0	0	0	4 (Note: Two appearances and one goal in the Europa League; two appearances in the Scottish Premiership play-offs)	1	12	1
Motherwell	2015–16	Scottish Premiership	27	0	2	0	0	0	0	0	29	0
Motherwell	2016–17	Scottish Premiership	25	0	1	0	5	0	0	0	31	0
Motherwell	2017–18	Scottish Premiership	4	0	1	0	3	0	0	0	8	0
Motherwell	Total		282	2	20	0	16	0	23	1	341	3
Career total			552	7	39	0	36	1	23	1	650	9

== Managerial record ==
As of match played 11 February 2023

Team	From	To	Record				
Team	From	To	G	W	D	L	Win %
Motherwell	29 July 2022	11 February 2023	28	7	5	16	25.00
Total			28	7	5	16	25.00

- Initially caretaker and appointed permanently on 11 August 2022

== Honours ==
Motherwell

- Scottish Premier League, Scottish Premiership runner-up: 2012–13, 2013–14
- Scottish Cup runner-up: 2010–11
- Scottish League Cup runner-up: 2004–05, 2017–18

Individual

- Motherwell Player of the Year: 2001
