= Steven Saunders =

Scottish footballer

Personal information
- Date of birth: 30 March 1991 (age 35)
- Place of birth: Rutherglen, Scotland
- Height: 1.88 m (6 ft 2 in)
- Position: Defender

Team information
- Current team: Albion Rovers (manager)

Youth career
- 2007–2008: Queen's Park

Senior career*
| Years | Team | Apps | (Gls) |
| 2008–2013 | Motherwell | 56 | (2) |
| 2013–2015 | Ross County | 19 | (1) |
| 2015–2016 | Dumbarton | 25 | (4) |
| 2016–2018 | The New Saints | 39 | (4) |
| 2018–2019 | Livingston | 3 | (0) |
| 2019–2020 | Partick Thistle | 28 | (2) |
| 2020 | Gartcairn | | |
| 2020–2022 | East Kilbride | | |

International career^{‡}
| 2009–2010 | Scotland U19 | 3 | (0) |
| 2010–2012 | Scotland U21 | 2 | (0) |
| 2010 | Scotland | 1 | (0) |

Managerial career
- 2026–: Albion Rovers
- * Club domestic league appearances and goals as of 12:00, 4 December 2020 (UTC) ‡ National team caps and goals as of 16 November 2010

Steven Saunders (born 30 March 1991) is a Scottish former professional footballer who played as a defender for Motherwell, Ross County, Dumbarton, The New Saints, Livingston and Partick Thistle at club level, and also represented Scotland once in 2010. As of June 2026, he is the manager of Lowland League West side Albion Rovers.

== Club career ==
=== Motherwell ===
After spending time with Queen's Park as a youth player, Saunders started his professional career with Motherwell. He made his debut as a substitute in a Scottish Premier League match against Aberdeen on 29 November 2008. After the match, manager Mark McGhee said that he was "delighted" with Saunders' performance. Saunders then started the following two games against Kilmarnock and Hamilton Academical, playing at right back, and he was again praised by McGhee for his performance in the first of those games.

In the 2009–10 season, under new manager Jim Gannon, Saunders established himself as a regular starter in his preferred position of centre back. He scored his first goal for the club on Saturday 24 April 2010 against Hearts. Under Gannon's successor, Craig Brown, Saunders became a regular starter at right back.

On 10 August 2011, whilst playing for the Scotland under-21s, Saunders suffered an achilles tendon injury that ruled him out for most of the 2011–12 season. On 8 April 2012, Saunders made his first-team comeback as a late substitute in a 1–1 draw against Hibernian. Saunders was released by Motherwell at the end of the 2012–13 season, after another lengthy injury lay-off restricted him to just one further appearance.

=== Ross County ===
On 8 July 2013, Saunders signed a one-year deal with Ross County. He made his debut for the club on 3 August 2013, in a 2–1 defeat against Celtic in the opening game of the 2013–14 season. On 17 November 2013, he scored his first Ross County goal against St Mirren, but he was then sent off later in the match.

Saunders signed a new one-year contract with Ross County on 19 May 2014. He was one of 14 players released by the club at the end of the season.

=== Dumbarton ===
After being released by Ross County, Saunders signed a short-term contract with Scottish Championship side Dumbarton in September 2015. He scored his first two goals for the club within two minutes of each other in a 3–3 draw with Raith on 21 November 2015. He extended his deal until the end of the season in January 2016.

=== The New Saints ===
Saunders signed a two-year deal with Welsh Premier League club The New Saints on 8 June 2016, alongside Dumbarton teammate Jon Routledge. He left the club in May 2018.

=== Livingston ===
On 31 May 2018, Saunders returned to Scotland to sign a two-year deal with Livingston. He only made five appearances for the Lions before departing in January 2019.

=== Partick Thistle ===
Saunders signed an 18-month contract with Partick Thistle in January 2019; he chose the number 43 squad number. He scored his first goal for Thistle in a 4–1 victory against Stranraer in the 2018–19 Scottish Cup. Saunders scored his first league goal for The Jags opening the scoring in an eventual 2–1 home defeat to Dundee United in August 2019.

In August 2020, with the lower leagues yet to commence due to the COVID-19 pandemic in Scotland (which also caused the cancellation of the previous campaign, with Partick controversially relegated to Scottish League One), Saunders announced his retirement from full-time football to pursue a career as a financial advisor.

=== East Kilbride ===
Saunders had a short spell with Gartcairn before signing with East Kilbride on 4 December 2020.

== International career ==
On 15 November 2010, Saunders was called up to the Scotland Squad for the first time, and made his debut the following evening in a 3–0 win over the Faroe Islands, replacing Phil Bardsley at right back in the 70th minute.

== Coaching career ==
After a period coaching at Kilwinning Rangers, his first managerial appointment was with Lowland League West side Albion Rovers, announced on 9 June 2026.

== Career statistics ==
As of 13:28, 16 August 2020 (UTC)

Appearances and goals by club, season and competition
| Club | Season | League | | National Cup | | League Cup | | Other | | Europe | | Total | |
| Club | Season | Apps | Goals | Apps | Goals | Apps | Goals | Apps | Goals | Apps | Goals | Apps | Goals |
|---|---|---|---|---|---|---|---|---|---|---|---|---|---|
| Motherwell | 2008–09 | 3 | 0 | 0 | 0 | 0 | 0 | 0 | 0 | 0 | 0 | 3 | 0 |
| Motherwell | 2009–10 | 25 | 1 | 1 | 0 | 2 | 0 | 0 | 0 | 4 | 0 | 32 | 1 |
| Motherwell | 2010–11 | 25 | 1 | 2 | 0 | 3 | 0 | 0 | 0 | 6 | 0 | 36 | 1 |
| Motherwell | 2011–12 | 2 | 0 | 0 | 0 | 0 | 0 | 0 | 0 | 0 | 0 | 2 | 0 |
| Motherwell | 2012–13 | 1 | 0 | 0 | 0 | 0 | 0 | 0 | 0 | 0 | 0 | 1 | 0 |
| Motherwell | Total | 56 | 2 | 3 | 0 | 5 | 0 | 0 | 0 | 10 | 0 | 74 | 2 |
| Ross County | 2013–14 | 12 | 1 | 1 | 0 | 0 | 0 | 0 | 0 | 0 | 0 | 13 | 1 |
| Ross County | 2014–15 | 7 | 0 | 0 | 0 | 0 | 0 | 0 | 0 | 0 | 0 | 7 | 0 |
| Ross County | Total | 19 | 1 | 1 | 0 | 0 | 0 | 0 | 0 | 0 | 0 | 20 | 1 |
| Dumbarton | 2015–16 | 25 | 4 | 2 | 0 | 0 | 0 | 0 | 0 | 0 | 0 | 27 | 4 |
| The New Saints | 2016–17 | 29 | 4 | 3 | 0 | 1 | 0 | 2 | 1 | 1 | 0 | 36 | 5 |
| The New Saints | 2017–18 | 10 | 0 | 1 | 0 | 0 | 0 | 0 | 0 | 4 | 0 | 15 | 0 |
| The New Saints | Total | 39 | 4 | 4 | 0 | 1 | 0 | 2 | 1 | 5 | 0 | 51 | 5 |
| Livingston | 2018–19 | 3 | 0 | 0 | 0 | 2 | 0 | 0 | 0 | 0 | 0 | 5 | 0 |
| Partick Thistle | 2018–19 | 12 | 0 | 4 | 1 | 0 | 0 | 0 | 0 | 0 | 0 | 16 | 1 |
| Partick Thistle | 2019–20 | 16 | 2 | 2 | 0 | 4 | 1 | 2 | 0 | 0 | 0 | 24 | 3 |
| Partick Thistle | Total | 28 | 2 | 6 | 0 | 4 | 1 | 2 | 0 | 0 | 0 | 40 | 4 |
| Career total | | 169 | 13 | 16 | 0 | 12 | 1 | 4 | 1 | 15 | 0 | 237 | 16 |

== Honours ==
The New Saints

- Welsh Premier League: 2016–17, 2017–18
- Welsh League Cup: 2016–17, 2017–18

Individual

- Welsh Premier League Team of the Year: 2016–17
