= Keith Lasley =

Scottish footballer (born 1979)

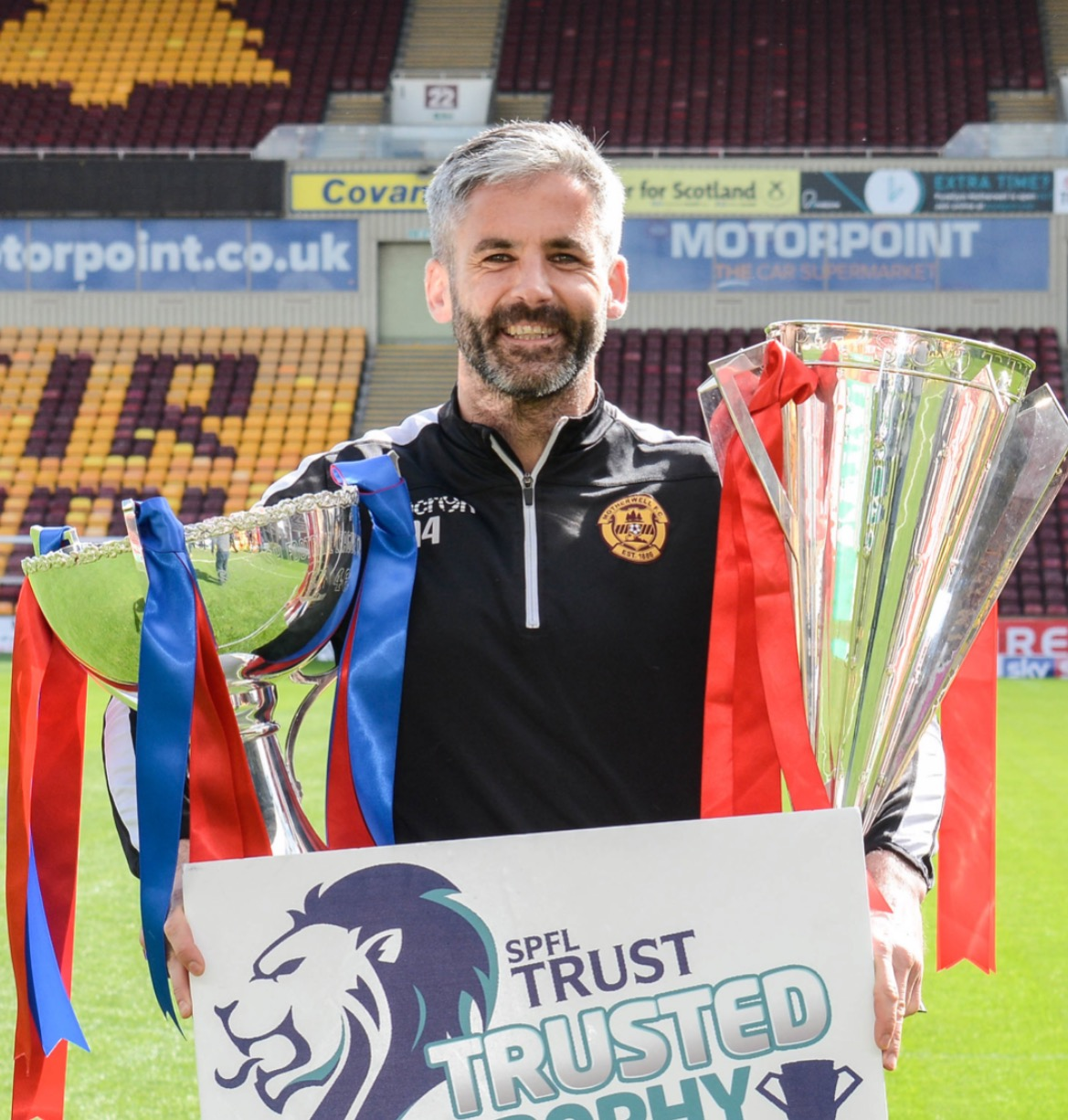
- Lasley for the SPFL Trust in 2017

Personal information
- Full name: Keith William Robert Lasley
- Date of birth: 21 September 1979 (age 47)
- Place of birth: Paisley, Scotland
- Height: 5 ft 8 in (1.73 m)
- Position: Midfielder

Senior career*
Years	Team	Apps	(Gls)
1999–2004	Motherwell	97	(9)
2004–2006	Plymouth Argyle	29	(0)
2006	→ Blackpool (loan)	8	(0)
2006–2017	Motherwell	316	(10)
Total		450	(19)

Managerial career
- 2017–2022: Motherwell (Assistant)
- 2020–2021: Motherwell (Interim Manager)
- * Club domestic league appearances and goals

Keith William Robert Lasley (born 21 September 1979) is a Scottish retired football midfielder, who is currently the Chief Operating Officer of Scottish Premiership club St Mirren. During his playing career, Lasley played for Motherwell, Plymouth Argyle and Blackpool.

== Life and career ==
According to Daily Record article, Lasley was born in Paisley, Scotland. However, the official Motherwell site lists his birthplace as Glasgow. He joined Motherwell in 1999 from Paisley side Gleniffer Thistle, but had to wait 18 months to make his first team debut. He established himself in the team during the 2001–02 season and played regularly up until leaving the club in the summer of 2004 when he chose to not renew his contract. He scored nine goals in 97 appearances. Lasley joined Plymouth Argyle in June 2004, having signed a two-year contract with the club. He made 24 league appearances in the Championship during the 2004–05 campaign, but lost his place in the team the following season and was loaned out to Blackpool in February 2006. Having been released by Argyle later that year, Lasley spent time training with Kilmarnock before deciding to rejoin Motherwell. A cruciate ligament injury picked up in December sidelined him for the rest of the 2006–07 campaign.

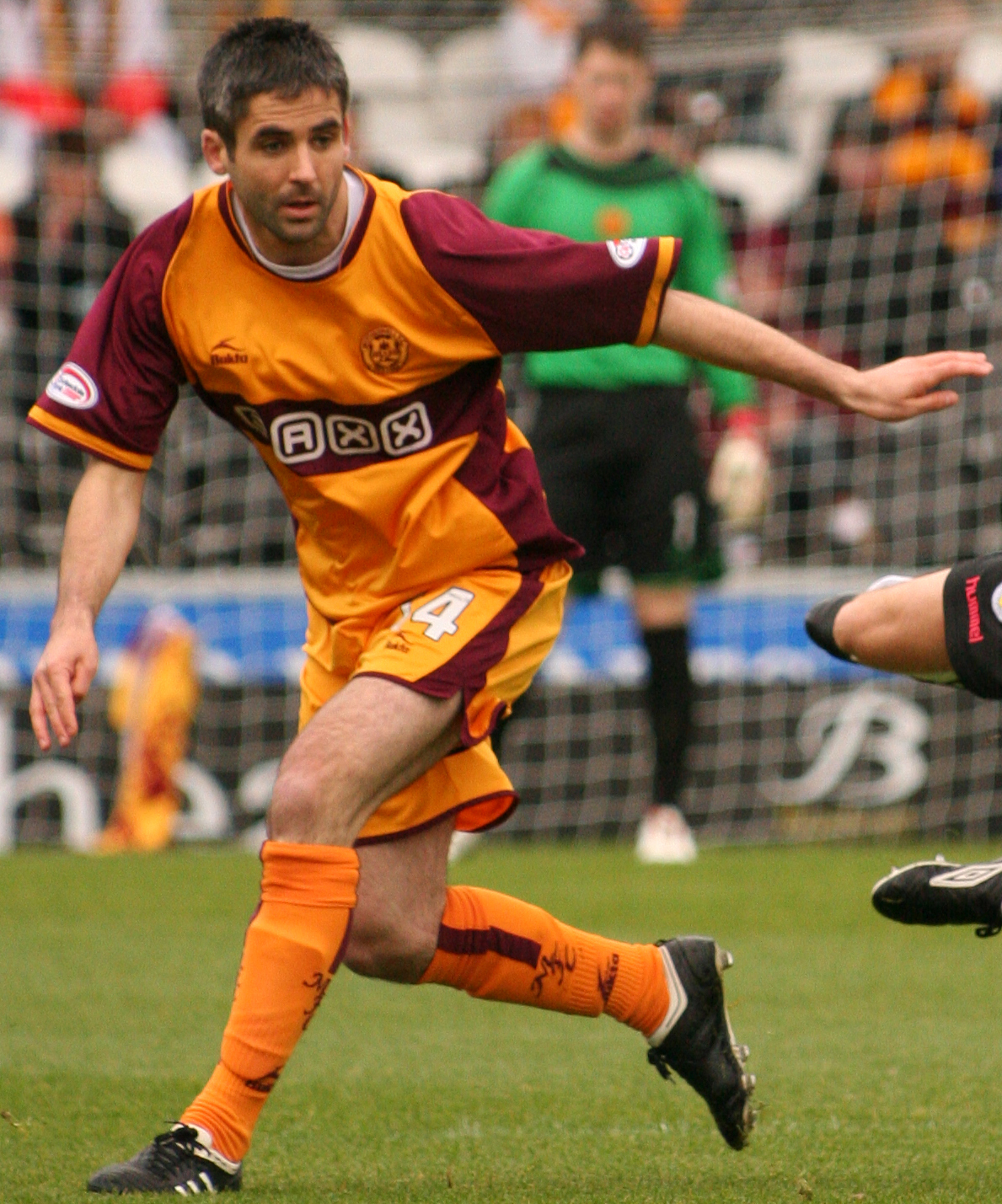
Lasley playing in 2009.

He returned to make 32 league appearances the following season, scoring one goal, and signed a two-year contract extension in April 2008. Lasley made 48 league appearances over the next two seasons and then extended his contract by a further two years in April 2010. Having scored twice in October 2011, Lasley won the Scottish Premier League Player of the Month award after helping Motherwell win three of their four league matches that month.

On 25 May 2012, Lasley signed an extended two-year contract with Motherwell. He will also be the club captain from the start of the 2012–13 season. On 3 June 2014, Lasley signed another two-year contract with Motherwell. On 6 December 2014, he made his 400th appearance for Motherwell, in a 1–0 defeat against Celtic.

On 5 September 2015, Lasley was rewarded for his time at Motherwell with a testimonial match against Bolton Wanderers. He signed a new one-year deal with the club on 22 June 2016.

On 21 June 2017, Motherwell announced that Lasley had retired from the game and taken up the vacant Assistant Manager role at the club.

On 31 December 2020, Lasley was appointed Interim Manager of Motherwell following the resignation of Stephen Robinson.

On 15 April 2022, it was announced that Keith would join St Mirren as their Chief Operating Officer, with him taking up the position on the 16th May 2022

On 12 September 2022, it was announced that Lasley was to be inducted into the Motherwell F.C. Hall of Fame.

== Career statistics ==
As of match played 16 May 2017

Appearances and goals by club, season and competition
Club	Season	League			National Cup		League Cup		Other		Total	
Club	Season	Division	Apps	Goals	Apps	Goals	Apps	Goals	Apps	Goals	Apps	Goals
Motherwell	2000–01	Scottish Premier League	12	1	1	0	0	0	0	0	13	1
Motherwell	2001–02	Scottish Premier League	28	2	1	0	1	0	0	0	30	2
Motherwell	2002–03	Scottish Premier League	24	3	3	0	2	0	0	0	29	3
Motherwell	2003–04	Scottish Premier League	33	3	3	0	1	1	0	0	37	4
Motherwell	Total		97	9	8	0	4	1	0	0	109	10
Plymouth Argyle	2004–05	Championship	24	0	0	0	1	0	0	0	25	0
Plymouth Argyle	2005–06	Championship	5	0	0	0	2	0	0	0	7	0
Plymouth Argyle	Total		29	0	0	0	3	0	0	0	32	0
Blackpool (loan)	2005–06	League One	7	0	0	0	0	0	0	0	7	0
Motherwell	2006–07	Scottish Premier League	14	0	0	0	3	0	0	0	17	0
Motherwell	2007–08	Scottish Premier League	32	1	3	0	3	1	0	0	38	2
Motherwell	2008–09	Scottish Premier League	28	0	2	0	1	0	2 (Note: Appearances in the UEFA Cup)	0	33	0
Motherwell	2009–10	Scottish Premier League	20	0	1	0	0	0	4 (Note: Appearances in the Europa League)	0	25	0
Motherwell	2010–11	Scottish Premier League	26	1	6	0	2	1	6	0	40	2
Motherwell	2011–12	Scottish Premier League	32	4	2	0	2	1	0	0	36	5
Motherwell	2012–13	Scottish Premier League	36	1	2	0	1	0	4 (Note: Two appearances in the Champions League and two in the Europa League)	0	43	1
Motherwell	2013–14	Scottish Premiership	37	2	1	0	1	0	2	0	41	2
Motherwell	2014–15	Scottish Premiership	33	0	1	0	1	0	4 (Note: Two appearances in the Europa League and two in the Premiership play-offs)	0	39	0
Motherwell	2015–16	Scottish Premiership	30	1	2	0	1	0	0	0	33	1
Motherwell	2016–17	Scottish Premiership	28	0	1	0	4	0	0	0	33	0
Motherwell	Total		316	10	21	0	19	3	22	0	378	13
Career total			449	19	29	0	26	4	22	0	526	23
