= Jamie Pollock (footballer, born 1992) =

Scottish footballer

Personal information
- Date of birth: 20 February 1992 (age 34)
- Place of birth: Glasgow, Scotland
- Position: Left midfielder

Team information
- Current team: Nicos United

Senior career*
Years	Team	Apps	(Gls)
2009–2012	Motherwell	4	(0)
2012	→ Clyde (loan)	9	(2)
2012–2013	East Fife	13	(3)
2013	Pollok	5	(0)
2014–2015	Albion Rovers	10	(1)
2015	→ Clyde (loan)	7	(1)
2015	Gartcairn Juniors		
- * Club domestic league appearances and goals as of 01:03, 9 February 2016 (UTC)

Jamie Pollock (born 20 February 1992) is a Scottish footballer, who plays amateur football for Nicos United. He has previously played in the Scottish Premier League for Motherwell and for Scottish lower leagues teams such as East Fife, Clyde and Albion Rovers.

== Career ==
A midfielder, Pollock started his career with Motherwell. He made his first-team debut against Celtic on 13 December 2009, coming off the bench as Motherwell lost the match 3–2. On 7 June 2011, Pollock signed a one-year professional contract at Motherwell. On 11 May 2012, unlike the previous season, Pollock would not be awarded with a new contract, leaving the club at the end of the 2011–12 season.

On 21 February 2012, Pollock joined Third Division club Clyde on a one-month loan, making his debut as a substitute the same day against Elgin City.

Pollock played as a trialist for East Fife in a league game against Arbroath on 15 September 2012, and signed for the club a few days later after impressing in training. Pollock left East Fife in January.

Pollock signed for his near namesake Pollok, on 1 August 2013. He made his debut in the first game of the season against St Anthony's setting up the only goal of the match in a 1–0 win at McKenna Park. Pollock was later released by the club on 25 August citing that he was only playing for Pollok on a temporary basis.

Albion Rovers picked up Pollock in the summer of 2014 but he ended the season on a second loan spell at Clyde. He lined up for new Junior side Gartcairn Juniors in 2015 alongside former Hibernian star Tam McManus but moved on to amateur football by November.
