= Gary Smith (footballer, born 1991) =

Scottish footballer

Personal information
- Date of birth: 28 May 1991 (age 35)
- Place of birth: Glasgow, Scotland
- Position: Striker

Team information
- Current team: Rutherglen Glencairn

Youth career
- 2005–2009: Queens Park

Senior career*
Years	Team	Apps	(Gls)
2009–2012	Motherwell	2	(0)
2010	→ Dumbarton (loan)	7	(0)
2012	→ Stenhousemuir (loan)	3	(3)
2012–2013	Shettleston		
2013–2017	Arthurlie		
2017–	Rutherglen Glencairn		
- * Club domestic league appearances and goals as of 20 June 2013

Gary Smith (born 28 May 1991) is a Scottish footballer who plays as a striker for Rutherglen Glencairn in the Scottish Junior Football Association, West Region. He has previously played in the Scottish Premier League and Europa League for Motherwell.

== Club career ==
=== Motherwell ===
Smith was signed by the Motherwell from Queens Park after he impressed the youth coaches. He was immediately drafted into the under-19 squad and made an immediate impression in the 2009-10 season, finishing as top scorer as the Motherwell under-19 team finished second. In September 2010, Smith made his professional debut against Breiðablik of Iceland in the Europa League, a match in which the Steelmen won 1-0.

Smith then made his league debut as a substitute in a 4-0 loss to Dundee United.

On 11 May 2012, Smith was released at the end of his contract, becoming a free agent.

=== Dumbarton (loan) ===
On 28 August, Smith was loaned out to Dumbarton for six-months in order to get regular first-team football. He made his debut for The Sons in a 6-0 defeat to East Fife, and made his first start in a 3-1 home defeat to Brechin City. He returned to Motherwell after his loan at Dumbarton came to an end in January.

=== Stenhousemuir (loan) ===
On 19 January 2012, Smith joined Second Division club Stenhousemuir on an initial one-month loan, that was later extended by a further month after Smith had scored 3 goals in 3 matches.

=== Juniors ===
After his release from Motherwell, Smith trained with Airdrie but suffered knee ligament damage in pre-season. He signed for Junior side Shettleston on his recovery, before moving on to Arthurlie in June 2013. Smith joined Rutherglen Glencairn in June 2017.
