= Jordan Halsman =

Scottish footballer

Personal information
- Date of birth: 13 June 1991 (age 35)
- Place of birth: Glasgow, Scotland
- Positions: Left back; left midfielder

Youth career
- ????–2009: Aberdeen
- 2009–2010: Motherwell

Senior career*
Years	Team	Apps	(Gls)
2010–2012	Motherwell	1	(0)
2010–2011	→ Annan Athletic (loan)	13	(4)
2011	→ Dumbarton (loan)	14	(2)
2012	→ Albion Rovers (loan)	7	(1)
2012–2013	Greenock Morton	10	(0)
2013	Fram	20	(1)
2014	Breiðablik UBK	7	(0)
2014–2015	Cowdenbeath	8	(0)
2015–2017	Elgin City	8	(0)
- * Club domestic league appearances and goals as of 20 December 2015

Jordan Halsman (born 13 June 1991) is a Scottish professional footballer, who played for Elgin City until 2017. He plays as left-back, but can also operate as a midfielder.

Whilst at Motherwell he had loan spells with Annan Athletic, Dumbarton and Albion Rovers. After Motherwell, he was signed with Greenock Morton and Cowdenbeath, whilst he has also played for Icelandic sides Fram and Breiðablik UBK.

== Career ==
Halsman came from the Motherwell youth development programme, and was instrumental as the Motherwell under-19 side finished second in the 2009–10 Scottish Premier under-19 League behind Celtic. Halsman, along with four other youth players, signed a two-year professional contract with the Fir Park club. He made his SPL debut as a substitute on 17 October 2009 against Celtic in a 0–0 draw at Celic Park. On 28 February 2010, Halsman appeared on Soccer AM taking part in the Skill Skool contest, but only just lost out to Euan Lindsay of Hamilton Accies.

On 21 July 2010, Halsman moved to Third Division side Annan Athletic on loan until 17 January 2011. Halsman was offered the chance to stay at the Galabank outfit for the rest of the season. However, the left-sided youngster rejected this, as he attempts to force his way into Motherwell manager Stuart McCall's first-team plans. On 28 January 2011, Halsman joined Dumbarton on loan, initially for a month, but that was then extended until the end of the season as part of Nicky Devlin's transfer to Motherwell. Halsman scored his first Dumbarton goal in a 5–2 home win over Peterhead. On 20 January 2012, Halsman was again sent out on loan, this time to Albion Rovers of the Second Division. His loan spell ended when he was recalled by Motherwell on 21 March 2012. Halsman was then released at the end of his contract on 11 May 2012, having struggled to break into the Motherwell first-team.

In June 2012, Halsman signed a one-year deal with First Division side Greenock Morton. At the end of the season, Halsman moved to Iceland to sign for Fram. On 29 January 2014 Halsman signed a one-year contract with Icelandic side Breidablik UBK. On 3 December 2014, Halsman returned to Scotland to sign for Scottish Championship side Cowdenbeath. Halsman made his debut on 6 December 2014 in a 1–0 defeat to Rangers at Ibrox Stadium. At the end of the 2014–15 season, Halsman was released by Cowdenbeath.

== Personal life ==
Halsman's younger brother, Bradley, is also a professional footballer. He was also with the Motherwell Under-19 squad up until he was released in Summer 2011, and currently plays for Nairn County.

== Honours ==
=== Greenock Morton ===
- Scottish Football League First Division: Runners-Up 2012–13

=== Fram Reykjavík ===
- Icelandic Cup: Winners 2013
