= Steven Howarth =

Scottish footballer (born 1992)

Steve Howarth
Personal information
- Date of birth: 3 June 1992 (age 34)
- Place of birth: Glasgow, Scotland
- Position: Striker

Youth career
- 200?–2009: Clyde

Senior career*
Years	Team	Apps	(Gls)
2009–2010	Clyde	11	(5)
2010–2012	Motherwell	2	(0)
2011	→ Alloa Athletic (loan)	2	(1)
2012–2013	Albion Rovers	22	(12)
- * Club domestic league appearances and goals

Steven Howarth (born 3 June 1992) is a Scottish former professional footballer who last played as a striker for Scottish Second Division side Albion Rovers.

== Career ==
=== Clyde ===
Howarth started his career at Clyde, but had to wait until the 2009–10 season before making his breakthrough to the first team. He made a total of 11 appearances for the Bully Wee, scoring 5 goals. He was mostly credited for his hard-working ability, and his good performances that season earned him, and team-mate Connor Stevenson, a trial at champions Rangers in October 2009. It was to be a poor season overall for Howarth, as Clyde were relegated to the Third Division, finishing bottom.

=== Motherwell ===
Howarth joined SPL club Motherwell in the closing hours of the transfer window on 31 August 2010. He is who plays for the under-19 side and reserve side at the Steelmen.

Howarth signed a new two-year professional contract at Motherwell, having been top scorer for the under-19 side in the 2010–11 season with 15 goals.

On 1 February 2012, Howarth and his club agreed to an early termination of his contract, four months before it was due to end.

==== Alloa Athletic (loan) ====
On 30 August 2011, Howarth joined Alloa Athletic on a one-month loan.

=== Albion Rovers ===
After spending months out of the game, Howarth was given a trial at Albion Rovers, and was awarded a contract after impressing manager Todd Lumsden.
