= Ross McKinnon (footballer) =

Scottish footballer

Personal information
- Date of birth: 9 October 1992 (age 34)
- Place of birth: Bellshill, Scotland
- Height: 1.83 m (6 ft 0 in)
- Position: Defender

Senior career*
Years	Team	Apps	(Gls)
2010–2012	Motherwell	0	(0)
2011	→ Dumbarton (loan)	7	(1)
2012	→ Alloa Athletic (loan)	16	(1)
2013–2014	Elgin City	17	(2)
2014	→ Clyde (loan)	7	(1)
2014	Clyde	4	(1)
2015–2016	East Kilbride		
2016–2017	BSC Glasgow		
2017–2018	Elgin City	1	(0)
- * Club domestic league appearances and goals

Ross McKinnon (born 9 October 1992) is a Scottish former footballer who played as a defender. McKinnon played for Motherwell, Clyde, East Kilbride and BSC Glasgow, as well as Dumbarton and Alloa Athletic on loan.

His uncle Rob McKinnon is also a former footballer who played as a defender, primarily for Hartlepool United and Motherwell. Now a firefighter for Scottish Fire and Rescue Service since 2018 responding out of Springburn Community Fire Station
