= 2013–14 Motherwell F.C. season =

Motherwell
2013–14 season
- Chairman: Vacant
- Manager: Stuart McCall
- Stadium: Fir Park
- Scottish Premiership: 2nd
- Scottish Cup: Fourth round v Albion Rovers
- League Cup: Quarter-final v Aberdeen
- Europa League: Third qualifying round v FC Kuban Krasnodar
- Top goalscorer: League: John Sutton (22); All: John Sutton (22)
Home colours	Away colours	Third colours

The 2013–14 season was Motherwell's twenty ninth consecutive season in the top flight of Scottish football and the first in the newly established Scottish Premiership, having been promoted from the Scottish First Division at the end of the 1984–85 season. They finished the season in second place, behind Celtic, earning entry to the Europa League again, having been knocked out of the 2013–14 seasons at the Third Qualifying Round stage by FC Kuban Krasnodar. They also competed in the League Cup, reaching the Quarter-Final, and the Scottish Cup where they reached the Fourth Round.

== Season events ==
On 20 May 2013, Motherwell announced their first signing of the summer, with Paul Lawson signing a two-year contract on 1 June from Ross County.

On 12 June, Motherwell announced the signing of Iain Vigurs from Ross County to a two-year contract.

On 28 June, Motherwell announced the return of John Sutton on a two-year contract after he was made redundant by Heart of Midlothian.

On 1 July, Motherwell announced that they had signed Fraser Kerr to a two-year contract after his Birmingham City contract had expired.

On 3 July, Motherwell announced the signing of Gunnar Nielsen to a two-year contract from Silkeborg.

On 15 July, Motherwell announced the signing of free-agent Stephen McManus to a one-year contract.

On 19 July, Motherwell announced the signing of James McFadden to a new one-year contract after his previous contract expired at the end of the previous season.

On 29 July, Motherwell announced that they had signed Henri Anier on loan from Viking until January.

On 29 August, Motherwell announced the signing of Lionel Ainsworth on loan from Rotherham United until January.

On 12 December, Motherwell signed Dan Twardzik on a short-term emergency loan after injuries to both Lee Hollis and Gunnar Nielsen.

On 3 January, Motherwell announced that they had extended their loan deal with Lionel Ainsworth until the end of the season.

On 10 January, Motherwell announced the signing of Henri Anier on from Viking, on a contract until the summer of 2016.

On 21 February, Motherwell announced the signing of Craig Reid on a contract until the end of the season.

On 28 April, Motherwell announced that Italian sportswear manufacturer Macron would become their kit supplier from the start of the 2014–15 season.

On 13 May, Motherwell announced that they had extended their contract with Stephen McManus until the summer of 2016.

On 23 May, Motherwell announced that they had extended their contract with Steven Hammell until the summer of 2016.

On 28 May, Motherwell announced that they had signed a new two-year contract with Craig Reid.

== Squad ==
As of match played 11 May 2014

No.	Name	Nationality	Position	Date of birth (age)	Signed from	Signed in	Contract ends	Apps.	Goals
Goalkeepers
1	Lee Hollis	(Scotland)	GK	27 March 1986 (aged 28)	Unattached	2010	2014	21	0
12	Gunnar Nielsen	(Faroe Islands)	GK	7 October 1986 (aged 27)	Silkeborg	2013	2015	23	0
21	Ross Stewart	(Scotland)	GK	10 April 1995 (aged 19)	Academy	2012		1	0
Defenders
2	Craig Reid	(Scotland)	DF	26 February 1986 (aged 28)	Unattached	2014	2016	14	1
3	Steven Hammell	(Scotland)	DF	18 February 1982 (aged 32)	Southend United	2008	2016	504	4
4	Simon Ramsden	(England)	DF	17 December 1981 (aged 32)	Unattached	2012	2015	53	0
5	Shaun Hutchinson	(England)	DF	23 November 1990 (aged 23)	Academy	2009	2014	144	9
6	Stephen McManus	(Scotland)	DF	2 September 1982 (aged 31)	Unattached	2013	2016	42	4
17	Zaine Francis-Angol	(Antigua and Barbuda)	DF	30 June 1993 (aged 20)	Tottenham Hotspur	2011	2015	63	3
20	Fraser Kerr	(Scotland)	DF	17 January 1993 (aged 21)	Unattached	2013	2015	42	0
23	Euan Murray	(Scotland)	DF	20 January 1994 (aged 20)	Academy	2013		3	0
32	Morgyn Neill	(Scotland)	DF	10 March 1996 (aged 18)	Academy	2013		0	0
	Ben Hall	(Northern Ireland)	DF	16 January 1997 (aged 17)	Dungannon Swifts	2013		0	0
Midfielders
8	Paul Lawson	(Scotland)	MF	15 May 1984 (aged 29)	Ross County	2013	2015	22	0
11	Iain Vigurs	(Scotland)	MF	7 May 1988 (aged 26)	Ross County	2013	2015	38	4
14	Keith Lasley	(Scotland)	MF	21 September 1979 (aged 34)	Unattached	2006	2014	382	22
18	Stuart Carswell	(Scotland)	MF	9 September 1993 (aged 20)	Academy	2011	2015	78	0
25	Lionel Ainsworth	(England)	MF	1 October 1987 (aged 26)	on loan from Rotherham United	2013	2014	31	11
26	Jack Leitch	(Scotland)	MF	17 July 1995 (aged 18)	Academy	2013		10	0
30	Dom Thomas	(Scotland)	MF	14 February 1996 (aged 18)	Academy	2013		0	0
34	Chris Cadden	(Scotland)	MF	19 September 1996 (aged 17)	Academy	2013		3	0
Forwards
7	James McFadden	(Scotland)	FW	14 April 1983 (aged 31)	Unattached	2013	2014	113	42
9	John Sutton	(England)	FW	26 December 1983 (aged 30)	Unattached	2013	2015	166	65
19	Lee Erwin	(Scotland)	FW	19 March 1994 (aged 20)	Academy	2013		0	0
22	Craig Moore	(Scotland)	FW	16 August 1994 (aged 19)	Academy	2011		19	1
24	Henri Anier	(Estonia)	FW	17 December 1990 (aged 23)	Viking	2014	2016	36	9
29	Dale Shirkie	(Scotland)	FW	2 May 1995 (aged 19)	Academy	2013		1	0
39	Paul McCafferty	(Scotland)	FW	18 January 1995 (aged 19)	Academy	2013		0	0
Away on loan
15	Adam Cummins	(England)	DF	3 March 1993 (aged 21)	Everton	2011	2015	34	1
16	Bob McHugh	(Scotland)	FW	16 July 1991 (aged 22)	Academy	2007	2015	88	8
Left during the season
8	Henrik Ojamaa	(Estonia)	FW	20 May 1991 (aged 22)	RoPS	2012	2014	65	13
51	Dan Twardzik	(Germany)	GK	10 April 1995 (aged 19)	on loan from Dundee	2013	2014	5	0

== Transfers ==
=== In ===
Date	Position	Nationality	Name	From	Fee	Ref.
1 June 2013	MF	(Scotland)	Paul Lawson	Ross County	Free	
12 June 2013	MF	(Scotland)	Iain Vigurs	Ross County	Undisclosed	
28 June 2013	FW	(England)	John Sutton	Unattached	Free	
1 July 2013	DF	(Scotland)	Fraser Kerr	Unattached	Free	
3 July 2013	GK	(Faroe Islands)	Gunnar Nielsen	Silkeborg	Undisclosed	
15 July 2013	DF	(Scotland)	Stephen McManus	Middlesbrough	Free	
15 July 2013	MF	(Northern Ireland)	Ben Hall	Dungannon Swifts	Undisclosed	
10 January 2014	FW	(Estonia)	Henri Anier	Viking	Undisclosed	
21 February 2014	DF	(Scotland)	Craig Reid	Unattached	Free	

=== Loans in ===
Date from	Position	Nationality	Name	From	Date to	Ref.
29 July 2013	FW	(Estonia)	Henri Anier	Viking	January 2014	
29 August 2013	MF	(England)	Lionel Ainsworth	Rotherham United	End of season	
12 December 2013	GK	(Czech Republic)	Dan Twardzik	Dundee	January 2014	

=== Out ===
Date	Position	Nationality	Name	To	Fee	Ref.
7 June 2013	FW	(Estonia)	Henrik Ojamaa	Legia Warsaw	Undisclosed	

=== Loans out ===
Date from	Position	Nationality	Name	To	Date to	Ref.
31 August 2013	FW	(Scotland)	Lee Erwin	Arbroath	31 December 2013	
9 January 2014	DF	(England)	Adam Cummins	Dundee	End of season	
13 January 2014	FW	(Scotland)	Bob McHugh	Queen of the South	End of season	

=== Released ===
Date	Position	Nationality	Name	Joined	Date	Ref.
31 May 2014	DF	(England)	Shaun Hutchinson	Fulham	16 June 2014	
31 May 2014	DF	(Scotland)	Ross Kellock	University of Stirling	1 July 2016	
31 May 2014	MF	(Scotland)	Frazer Johnstone	Airdrieonians		
31 May 2014	FW	(Scotland)	Paul McCafferty	University of Stirling	1 July 2015	
31 May 2014	FW	(Scotland)	James McFadden	St Johnstone	1 October 2014	
31 May 2014	FW	(Scotland)	Dale Shirkie	Ayr United	15 August 2014	

== Friendlies ==
13 July 2013	Doncaster Rovers	0–0	Motherwell	Doncaster
15:00 BST UTC+1		Report		Stadium: Keepmoat Stadium; Attendance: 1,983

16 July 2013	Motherwell	2–4	Newcastle United	Motherwell
19:00 BST UTC+1	Vigurs 26'; McFadden 52' (pen.)	Report	Vučkić 8'; Gouffran 15'; Sissoko 39'; Marveaux 64'	Stadium: Fir Park; Attendance: 4,475; Referee: Willie Collum

20 July 2013	Morecambe	1–2	Motherwell XI	Morecambe
14:00 BST UTC+1	Arnold 23'	Report	Anier 16'; Smith 90'	Stadium: Globe Arena

20 July 2013	Cowdenbeath	0–5	Motherwell XI	Cowdenbeath
15:00 BST UTC+1		Report	Thomas 30'; McHugh 42' (pen.), 76'; Lasley 80'; Moore 84'	Stadium: Central Park

26 July 2013	Motherwell	1–1	Nottingham Forest	Motherwell
19:00 BST UTC+1	McHugh 83'	Report	Derbyshire 11'	Stadium: Fir Park

== Competitions ==
=== Overview ===
Competition	First match	Last match	Starting round	Final position	Record							
Competition	First match	Last match	Starting round	Final position	Pld	W	D	L	GF	GA	GD	Win %
Premiership	4 August 2013	11 May 2014	Matchday 1	2nd	38	22	4	12	64	60	+4	57.89
Scottish Cup	30 November 2013	30 November 2013	Fourth round	Fourth round	1	0	0	1	0	1	−1	0.00
League Cup	25 September 2013	30 October 2013	Third round	Quarterfinal	2	1	0	1	2	3	−1	50.00
UEFA Europa League	1 August 2013	8 August 2013	Third qualifying round	Third qualifying round	2	0	0	2	0	3	−3	0.00
Total					43	23	4	16	66	67	−1	53.49

Last updated: 11 May 2014
Source: Soccerway

=== Premiership ===
==== League table ====
Pos	Team	Pld	W	D	L	GF	GA	GD	Pts	Qualification or relegation
1	Celtic (C)	38	31	6	1	102	25	+77	99	Qualification for the Champions League second qualifying round
2	Motherwell	38	22	4	12	64	60	+4	70	Qualification for the Europa League second qualifying round
3	Aberdeen	38	20	8	10	53	38	+15	68	Qualification for the Europa League first qualifying round
4	Dundee United	38	16	10	12	65	50	+15	58	
5	Inverness Caledonian Thistle	38	16	9	13	44	44	0	57	
6	St Johnstone	38	15	8	15	48	42	+6	53	Qualification for the Europa League second qualifying round (Note: St Johnstone, as winners of the 2013–14 Scottish Cup, qualified for the Europa League second qualifying round.)
7	Ross County	38	11	7	20	44	62	−18	40	
8	St Mirren	38	10	9	19	39	58	−19	39	
9	Kilmarnock	38	11	6	21	45	66	−21	39	
10	Partick Thistle	38	8	14	16	46	65	−19	38	
11	Hibernian (R)	38	8	11	19	31	51	−20	35	Qualification for the Premiership play-off final
12	Heart of Midlothian (R)	38	10	8	20	45	65	−20	23 (Note: Heart of Midlothian were deducted 15 points for entering administration)	Relegation to the Championship

Source: SPFL Archive
Rules for classification: 1) points; 2) goal difference; 3) number of goals scored.
(C) Champions; (R) Relegated

==== Results summary ====
Overall								Home						Away					
Pld	W	D	L	GF	GA	GD	Pts	W	D	L	GF	GA	GD	W	D	L	GF	GA	GD
38	22	4	12	64	60	+4	70	13	2	4	39	29	+10	9	2	8	25	31	−6

Source: BBC Sport

==== Results by round ====
Round	1	2	3	4	5	6	7	8	9	10	11	12	13	14	15	16	17	18	19	20	21	22	23	24	25	26	27	28	29	30	31	32	33	34	35	36	37	38
Ground	A	H	A	H	H	A	A	H	A	H	A	H	H	A	H	A	H	A	A	H	A	A	H	H	A	A	H	A	H	H	H	A	A	H	A	H	H	A
Result	W	L	L	W	W	W	D	W	L	W	L	W	L	W	L	W	W	W	W	W	W	L	D	W	L	L	W	D	W	W	L	W	L	D	L	W	W	W
Position	4	6	6	5	3	3	4	3	3	3	4	4	4	3	3	5	4	2	2	2	3	3	3	3	3	3	3	3	3	3	3	2	3	3	3	3	3	2

Source: BBC Sport
A = Away; H = Home; W = Win; D = Draw; L = Loss

==== Results ====
4 August 2013 1	Hibernian	0–1	Motherwell	Easter Road
13:15 BST UTC+1		Motherwell; BBC	Anier 83'	Attendance: 9,237; Referee: Bobby Madden

11 August 2013 2	Motherwell	1–3	Aberdeen	Fir Park
15:00 BST UTC+1	Anier 1'	Motherwell; BBC	McGinn 62' (pen.), 84' (pen.); Reynolds 76'	Attendance: 6,242; Referee: Kevin Clancy

17 August 2013 3	Inverness Caledonian Thistle	2–0	Motherwell	Caledonian Stadium
15:00 BST UTC+1	Foran 4'; McKay 36'	Motherwell; BBC		Attendance: 3,031; Referee: Iain Brines

24 August 2013 4	Motherwell	1–0	Partick Thistle	Fir Park
15:00 BST UTC+1	Sutton 21'	Motherwell; BBC		Attendance: 5,527; Referee: Euan Norris

31 August 2013 5	Motherwell	2–1	Kilmarnock	Fir Park
17:30 BST UTC+1	Anier 20'; Sutton 45'; Ramsden (yellow card) 87' (yellow-red card)	Motherwell; BBC	McManus 17' (o.g.)	Attendance: 4,353; Referee: Craig Charleston

14 September 2013 6	St Mirren	0–1	Motherwell	St Mirren Park
15:00 BST UTC+1		Motherwell; BBC	Sutton 38'	Attendance: 4,012; Referee: Craig Thomson

21 September 2013 7	Dundee United	2–2	Motherwell	Tannadice Stadium
15:00 BST UTC+1	Çiftçi 54'; Robertson 57'	Motherwell; BBC	Anier 30'; Ainsworth 76'	Attendance: 5,808; Referee: Kevin Clancy

28 September 2013 8	Motherwell	3–1	Ross County	Fir Park
15:00 BST UTC+1	Sutton 54', 68'; McHugh 77'	Motherwell; BBC	De Leeuw 30'	Attendance: 4,263; Referee: Bobby Madden

5 October 2013 9	Celtic	2–0	Motherwell	Celtic Park
15:00 BST UTC+1	Stokes 21'; Commons 49'	Motherwell; BBC		Referee: Iain Brines

19 October 2013 10	Motherwell	2–1	Hearts	Fir Park
15:00 BST UTC+1	Moore 69'; Hutchinson 83'	Motherwell; BBC	Stevenson 62'	Attendance: 5,350; Referee: Brian Colvin

26 October 2013 11	St Johnstone	2–0	Motherwell	McDiarmid Park
15:00 BST UTC+1	May 49'; Hasselbaink 64'	Motherwell; BBC		Attendance: 2,449; Referee: Calum Murray

3 November 2013 12	Motherwell	1–0	Hibernian	Fir Park
12:30 BST UTC+1	McManus 23'; Hutchinson (yellow card) 87' (yellow-red card)	Motherwell; BBC		Attendance: 3,864; Referee: Crawford Allan

9 November 2013 13	Motherwell	0–4	Dundee United	Fir Park
15:00 BST UTC+1		Motherwell; BBC	Gauld 16', 64'; Paton 19'; Robertson 90'	Attendance: 5,103; Referee: Steven McLean

23 November 2013 14	Kilmarnock	0–2	Motherwell	Rugby Park
15:00 BST UTC+1		Motherwell; BBC	Sutton 55'; Anier 88'	Attendance: 3,704; Referee: Stephen Finnie

6 December 2013 15	Motherwell	0–5	Celtic	Fir Park
19:45 BST UTC+1		Motherwell; BBC	Commons 44', 76'; Ambrose 54'; Stokes 78'; Atajic 90'	Attendance: 9,117; Referee: Steven McLean

14 December 2013 16	Ross County	1–2	Motherwell	Victoria Park
15:00 BST UTC+1	De Leeuw 62'	Motherwell; BBC	Sutton 15', 27'	Attendance: 2,792; Referee: Crawford Allan

21 December 2013 17	Motherwell	3–0	St Mirren	Fir Park
15:00 BST UTC+1	Anier 31', 64'; Ainsworth 42'	Motherwell; BBC		Attendance: 3,867; Referee: Willie Collum

26 December 2013 18	Aberdeen	0–1	Motherwell	Pittodrie Stadium
15:00 BST UTC+1		Motherwell; BBC	Ainsworth 49'	Attendance: 12,494; Referee: Kevin Clancy

29 December 2013 19	Partick Thistle	1–5	Motherwell	Firhill Stadium
15:00 BST UTC+1	Lawless 8'	Motherwell; BBC	Lasley 15'; Francis-Angol 21'; McFadden 36'; Ainsworth 57'; Sutton 65'	Attendance: 4,588; Referee: Steven McLean

1 January 2014 20	Motherwell	4–0	St Johnstone	Fir Park
15:00 BST UTC+1	Sutton 22'; Vigurs 49'; Ainsworth 73'; McFadden 87'	Motherwell; BBC		Attendance: 3,763; Referee: John Beaton

4 January 2014 21	Motherwell	Postponed	Inverness Caledonian Thistle	Fir Park
12:45 BST UTC+1		Motherwell; BBC

11 January 2014 22	Hearts	0–1	Motherwell	Tynecastle Stadium
15:00 BST UTC+1		Motherwell; BBC	Sutton 40'	Attendance: 12,888; Referee: Willie Collum

18 January 2014 23	Celtic	3–0	Motherwell	Celtic Park
15:00 BST UTC+1	Commons 5', 39' (pen.); McManus 68' (o.g.)	Motherwell; BBC		Attendance: 47,489; Referee: Bobby Madden

25 January 2014 24	Motherwell	2–2	Aberdeen	Fir Park
15:00 BST UTC+1	McManus 47'; Francis-Angol 69'	Motherwell; BBC	Rooney 67'; Anderson 90'	Attendance: 5,756; Referee: Steven McLean

15 February 2014 25	Motherwell	4–3	Partick Thistle	Fir Park
15:00 BST UTC+1	Lasley 43'; Ainsworth 52'; Sutton 85'; McManus 88'	Motherwell; BBC	Erskine 37'; Higginbotham 66' (pen.), 72'	Attendance: 5,048; Referee: Stephen Finnie

22 February 2014 26	Dundee United	3–1	Motherwell	Tannadice Stadium
15:00 BST UTC+1	Dow 22'; Gunning 42', 47'	Motherwell; BBC	Sutton 57' (pen.)	Attendance: 7,029; Referee: Bobby Madden

25 February 2014 27	St Johnstone	3–0	Motherwell	McDiarmid Park
19:45 BST UTC+1	MacLean 6', 35'; Miller 87'	Motherwell; BBC		Attendance: 1,892; Referee: Kevin Clancy

1 March 2014 28	Motherwell	4–1	Hearts	Fir Park
15:00 BST UTC+1	Vigurs 18'; Ainsworth 37'; Sutton 65'; McFadden 74'	Motherwell; BBC	Paterson 69'	Attendance: 4,914; Referee: John Beaton

8 March 2014 31	Hibernian	3–3	Motherwell	Easter Road
15:00 BST UTC+1	Forster 43'; Nelson 76'; Heffernan 79'	Motherwell; BBC	Sutton 12', 90'; Ainsworth 29'	Attendance: 8,277; Referee: Steven McLean

19 March 2014 21	Motherwell	2–0	Inverness Caledonian Thistle	Fir Park
19:45 BST UTC+1	Ainsworth 26'; Sutton 34'	Motherwell; BBC		Attendance: 3,432; Referee: Alan Muir

22 March 2014 30	Motherwell	2–1	Ross County	Fir Park
15:00 BST UTC+1	McFadden 48'; Sutton 60'	Motherwell; BBC	Songo'o 82'	Attendance: 4,080; Referee: Iain Brines

29 March 2014 32	Motherwell	1–2	Kilmarnock	Fir Park
15:00 BST UTC+1	Vigurs 41'	Motherwell; BBC	McKenzie 66'; Slater 90'	Attendance: 4,467; Referee: Bobby Madden

1 April 2014 32	Inverness Caledonian Thistle	1–2	Motherwell	Caledonian Stadium
19:45 BST UTC+1	Christie 74'	Motherwell; BBC	Anier 40'; Vigurs 83'	Attendance: 2,366; Referee: Craig Thomson

5 April 2014 33	St Mirren	3–2	Motherwell	St Mirren Park
15:00 BST UTC+1	Thompson 42', 87'; McLean 86' (pen.)	Motherwell; BBC	Anier 17'; Sutton 27'	Attendance: 4,377; Referee: Euan Norris

19 April 2014 34	Motherwell	3–3	Celtic	Fir Park
12:45 BST UTC+1	Sutton 5', 90'; Francis-Angol 44'	Motherwell; BBC	Stokes 45'; Samaras 56'; Griffiths 86'	Attendance: 7,493; Referee: Craig Thomson

26 April 2014 35	Dundee United	5–1	Motherwell	Tannadice Stadium
15:00 BST UTC+1	Çiftçi 8', 41'; Armstrong 61'; Dow 72'; Graham 81'	Motherwell; BBC	Ainsworth 88'	Attendance: 6,383; Referee: Steven McLean

3 May 2014 36	Motherwell	2–1	St Johnstone	Fir Park
15:00 BST UTC+1	Ainsworth 21'; McManus 36'	Motherwell; BBC	Mackay 27'	Attendance: 7,201; Referee: Kevin Clancy

7 May 2014 37	Motherwell	2–1	Inverness Caledonian Thistle	Fir Park
19:45 BST UTC+1	Sutton 4' (pen.); Warren 32' (o.g.)	Motherwell; BBC	Shinnie 55'	Attendance: 4,482; Referee: Willie Collum

11 May 2014 38	Aberdeen	0–1	Motherwell	Pittodrie Stadium
12:15 BST UTC+1		Motherwell; BBC	Reid 90'	Attendance: 17,016; Referee: Steven McLean

=== Scottish Cup ===
30 November 2013 Fourth Round	Albion Rovers	1–0	Motherwell	New Douglas Park
15:00 BST UTC+1	Phillips 90'	Motherwell; BBC		Attendance: 2,950; Referee: Euan Anderson

=== League Cup ===
25 September 2013 Third round	Livingston	1–2	Motherwell	Almondvale Stadium
19:45 BST UTC+1	Talbot (red card) 65'; Denholm 90'	Motherwell; BBC	McHugh 16'; McFadden 73'	Attendance: 1,660

30 October 2013 Quarter-Final	Motherwell	0–2	Aberdeen	Fir Park
19:45 BST UTC+1		[ Motherwell] BBC	Shaughnessy (red card) 13'; Considine 83'; Hayes 90'	Attendance: 6,995; Referee: John Beaton

=== UEFA Europa League ===
==== Qualifying phase ====
1 August 2013 3rd qualifying round 1st leg	Motherwell (Scotland)	0–2	(Russia) Kuban Krasnodar	Motherwell, Scotland
19:45 BST UTC+1		Report	Popov 52', 78'	Stadium: Fir Park; Attendance: 6,748; Referee: Alain Bieri (Switzerland)

8 August 2013 3rd qualifying round 2nd leg	Kuban Krasnodar (Russia)	1–0	(Scotland) Motherwell	Krasnodar, Russia
19:45 BST UTC+1	McManus 50' (o.g.)	Report		Stadium: Kuban Stadium; Attendance: 31,754; Referee: Cristian Balaj (Romania)

== Squad statistics ==
=== Appearances ===
As of match played 11 May 2014

No.	Pos	Nat	Player	Total		Scottish Premiership		Scottish Cup		League Cup		UEFA Europa League	
No.	Pos	Nat	Player	Apps	Goals	Apps	Goals	Apps	Goals	Apps	Goals	Apps	Goals
1	GK	(Scotland) SCO	Lee Hollis	15	0	14	0	0	0	0	0	1	0
2	DF	(Scotland) SCO	Craig Reid	14	1	13+1	1	0	0	0	0	0	0
3	DF	(Scotland) SCO	Steven Hammell	39	0	34	0	1	0	2	0	2	0
4	DF	(England) ENG	Simon Ramsden	22	0	18	0	0	0	2	0	2	0
5	DF	(England) ENG	Shaun Hutchinson	40	1	35	1	1	0	2	0	2	0
6	DF	(Scotland) SCO	Stephen McManus	42	4	37	4	1	0	2	0	2	0
7	MF	(Scotland) SCO	James McFadden	30	5	21+6	4	1	0	1	1	1	0
8	MF	(Scotland) SCO	Paul Lawson	22	0	5+12	0	1	0	2	0	2	0
9	FW	(England) ENG	John Sutton	41	22	38	22	0+1	0	1	0	1	0
11	MF	(Scotland) SCO	Iain Vigurs	38	4	34+3	4	0	0	0	0	1	0
12	GK	(Faroe Islands) FRO	Gunnar Nielsen	23	0	19	0	1	0	2	0	1	0
14	MF	(Scotland) SCO	Keith Lasley	41	2	37	2	0+1	0	1	0	2	0
17	DF	(Antigua and Barbuda) ANT	Zaine Francis-Angol	38	3	21+12	3	1	0	2	0	2	0
18	MF	(Scotland) SCO	Stuart Carswell	32	0	24+4	0	1	0	2	0	1	0
20	DF	(Scotland) SCO	Fraser Kerr	22	0	10+9	0	1	0	0	0	1+1	0
22	FW	(Scotland) SCO	Craig Moore	19	1	3+14	1	0	0	0+1	0	0+1	0
23	DF	(Scotland) SCO	Euan Murray	3	0	1+2	0	0	0	0	0	0	0
24	FW	(Estonia) EST	Henri Anier	36	9	18+14	9	1	0	1	0	1+1	0
25	MF	(England) ENG	Lionel Ainsworth	31	11	22+7	11	0	0	1+1	0	0	0
26	MF	(Scotland) SCO	Jack Leitch	10	0	6+3	0	0+1	0	0	0	0	0
29	FW	(Scotland) SCO	Dale Shirkie	1	0	0+1	0	0	0	0	0	0	0
34	MF	(Scotland) SCO	Chris Cadden	3	0	0+3	0	0	0	0	0	0	0
Players away from the club on loan:
15	DF	(England) ENG	Adam Cummins	5	0	1+2	0	0	0	0+1	0	0+1	0
16	FW	(Scotland) SCO	Bob McHugh	12	2	3+5	1	1	0	1+1	1	0+1	0
Players who left Motherwell during the season::
51	GK	(Germany) GER	Dan Twardzik	5	0	5	0	0	0	0	0	0	0

=== Goal scorers ===
As of match played 11 May 2014

Ranking	Nation	Position	Number	Name	Premiership	Scottish Cup	League Cup	UEFA Europa League	Total
1	(England)	FW	9	John Sutton	22	0	0	0	22
2	(England)	MF	25	Lionel Ainsworth	11	0	0	0	11
3	(Estonia)	FW	24	Henri Anier	9	0	0	0	9
4	(Scotland)	FW	7	James McFadden	4	0	1	0	5
5	(Scotland)	DF	6	Stephen McManus	4	0	0	0	4
5	(Scotland)	MF	11	Iain Vigurs	4	0	0	0	4
7	(Antigua and Barbuda)	DF	17	Zaine Francis-Angol	3	0	0	0	3
8	(Scotland)	MF	14	Keith Lasley	2	0	0	0	2
8	(Scotland)	FW	16	Bob McHugh	1	0	1	0	2
10	(England)	DF	5	Shaun Hutchinson	1	0	0	0	1
10	(Scotland)	FW	22	Craig Moore	1	0	0	0	1
10	(Scotland)	DF	2	Craig Reid	1	0	0	0	1
10				Own goal	1	0	0	0	1
TOTALS					64	0	2	0	66

=== Clean sheets ===
As of match played 11 May 2014

Ranking	Nation	Position	Number	Name	Premiership	Scottish Cup	League Cup	UEFA Europa League	Total
1	(Scotland)	GK	1	Lee Hollis	4	0	0	0	4
1	(Faroe Islands)	GK	12	Gunnar Nielsen	4	0	0	0	4
3	(Germany)	GK	51	Dan Twardzik	3	0	0	0	3
TOTALS					11	0	0	0	11

=== Disciplinary record ===
As of match played 11 May 2014

Number	Nation	Position	Name	Premiership		Scottish Cup		League Cup		UEFA Europa League		Total	
Number	Nation	Position	Name	Yellow card	Red card	Yellow card	Red card	Yellow card	Red card	Yellow card	Red card	Yellow card	Red card
3	(Scotland)	DF	Steven Hammell	5	0	1	0	0	0	1	0	7	0
4	(England)	DF	Simon Ramsden	4	1	0	0	0	0	0	0	4	1
5	(England)	DF	Shaun Hutchinson	10	1	2	0	1	0	2	0	15	1
6	(Scotland)	DF	Stephen McManus	5	0	0	0	0	0	0	0	5	0
7	(Scotland)	MF	James McFadden	1	0	1	0	0	0	1	0	3	0
8	(Scotland)	MF	Paul Lawson	5	0	0	0	0	0	0	0	5	0
9	(England)	FW	John Sutton	2	0	0	0	0	0	0	0	2	0
11	(Scotland)	MF	Iain Vigurs	7	0	0	0	0	0	0	0	7	0
12	(Faroe Islands)	GK	Gunnar Nielsen	1	0	0	0	0	0	0	0	1	0
14	(Scotland)	MF	Keith Lasley	7	0	0	0	0	0	0	0	7	0
18	(Scotland)	MF	Stuart Carswell	4	0	0	0	2	0	0	0	6	0
20	(Scotland)	DF	Fraser Kerr	2	0	0	0	0	0	0	0	2	0
22	(Scotland)	FW	Craig Moore	3	0	0	0	0	0	0	0	3	0
24	(Estonia)	FW	Henri Anier	1	0	0	0	0	0	0	0	1	0
25	(England)	MF	Lionel Ainsworth	1	0	0	0	0	0	0	0	1	0
26	(Scotland)	MF	Jack Leitch	1	0	0	0	0	0	0	0	1	0
Players away from the club on loan::
15	(England)	DF	Adam Cummins	1	0	0	0	0	0	0	0	1	0
			TOTALS	60	2	0	0	3	0	4	0	67	2

== See also ==
- List of Motherwell F.C. seasons
