= Gunnar Nielsen (Faroese footballer) =

Faroese footballer (born 1986)

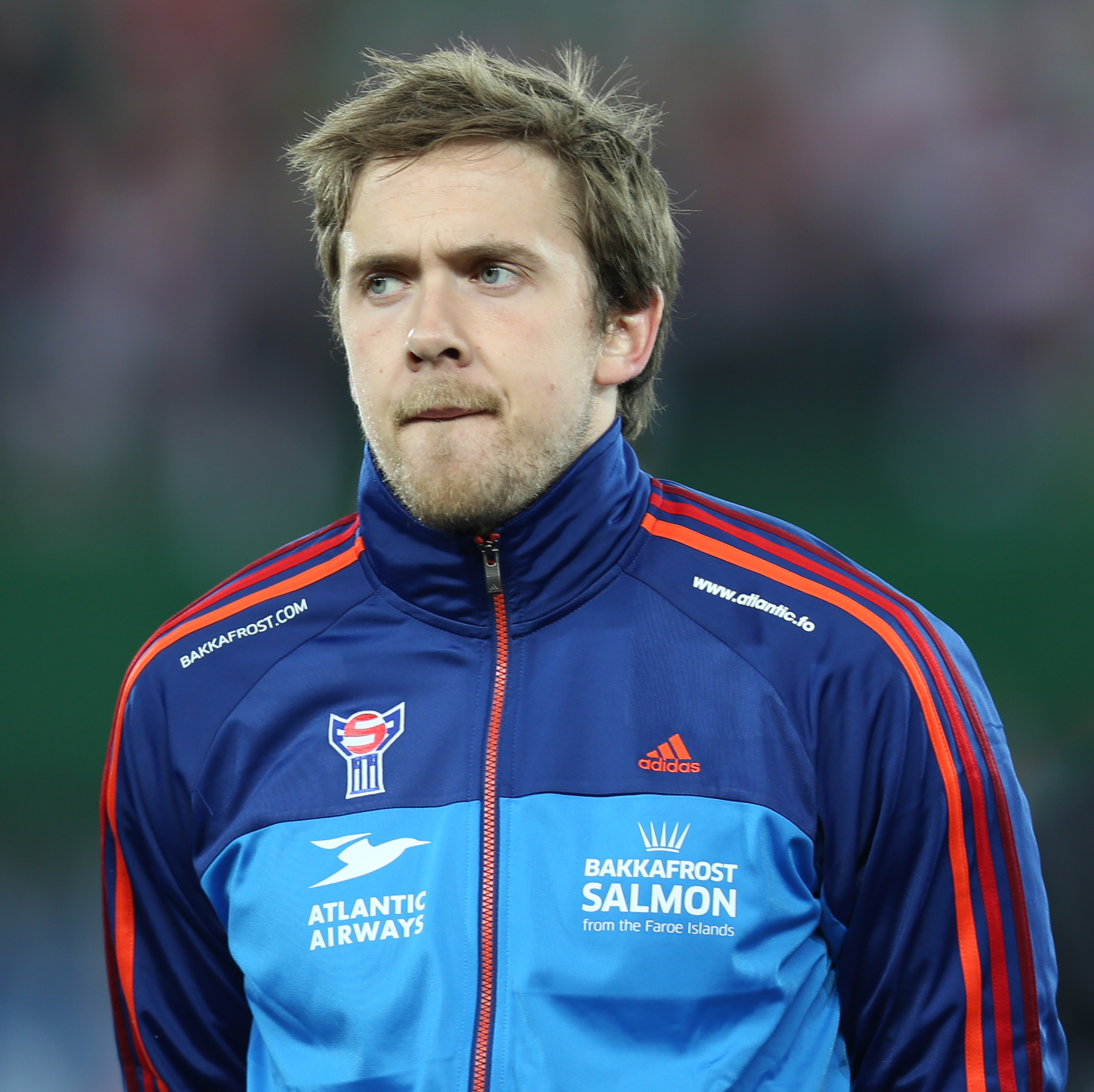
- Nielsen with the Faroe Islands in 2013

Personal information
- Full name: Gunnar Nielsen
- Date of birth: 7 October 1986 (age 40)
- Place of birth: Tórshavn, Faroe Islands
- Height: 6 ft 3 in (1.91 m)
- Position: Goalkeeper

Youth career
- HB

Senior career*
Years	Team	Apps	(Gls)
–2004	HB	0	(0)
2004–2007	BK Frem	16	(0)
2007–2009	Blackburn Rovers	0	(0)
2008	→ Motherwell (loan)	0	(0)
2009–2012	Manchester City	1	(0)
2009	→ Wrexham (loan)	4	(0)
2010–2011	→ Tranmere Rovers (loan)	2	(0)
2013	Silkeborg	8	(0)
2013–2015	Motherwell	19	(0)
2015	Stjarnan	20	(0)
2016–2023	FH	120	(0)
Total		190	(0)

International career
2001–2002	Faroe Islands U17	13	(0)
2002–2004	Faroe Islands U19	8	(0)
2007–2008	Faroe Islands U21	10	(0)
2009–2022	Faroe Islands	70	(0)
- * Club domestic league appearances and goals

Gunnar Nielsen (born 7 October 1986) is a Faroese retired professional footballer who played as a goalkeeper. Nielsen played for HB, Boldklubben Frem, Gøtu Ítróttarfelag, Blackburn Rovers, Manchester City, Wrexham, Tranmere Rovers, Silkeborg, Motherwell, Stjarnan and FH, and the Faroe Islands national football team at all age levels.

== Club career ==
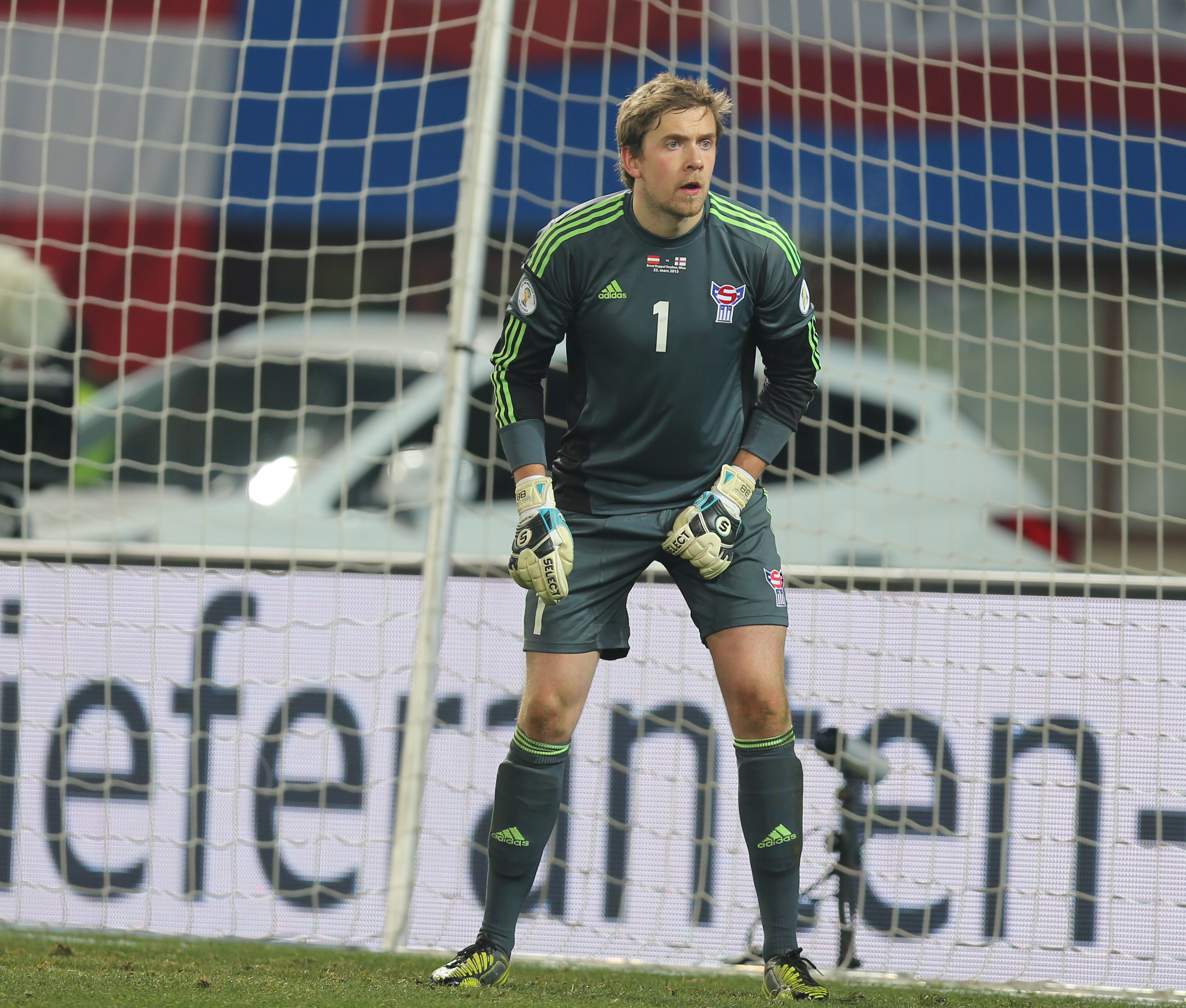
Nielsen against Austria, 2013

Born in Tórshavn, Nielsen was signed by Blackburn Rovers for a "small" undisclosed fee on 2 July 2007 from BK Frem. Nielsen, who was on trial with Rovers in May, told the club website: "I am very pleased – it is a massive chance for me just to develop. I'm glad the manager and staff believe in me and I won't let them down." He transferred Motherwell of the Scottish Premier League on a six-month loan on 8 August 2008, before returning to Blackburn on 30 December 2008.

Nielsen signed for Manchester City on a two-and-a-half-year contract in 2009 and joined Conference National side Wrexham on loan shortly afterwards. He made his debut in a 1–0 defeat to Histon on 28 March. He was suspected to have sustained a thumb injury during a game against Oxford United in April, meaning he returned to City for a scan, which confirmed the suspected injury. Nielsen made his Premier League debut on 24 April 2010 as a substitute for injured Shay Given in the 76th minute during Manchester City's stalemate against Arsenal. As a result, he became the first Faroese footballer to play in the Premier League. In the summer of 2010, he signed a contract extension with Manchester City that ran until 2012.

On 23 July 2010 Nielsen joined League One team Tranmere Rovers on loan until January 2011. He made his debut for Tranmere in a 2–1 defeat by Oldham Athletic on 7 August, After picking up an injury on international duty, he spent over three months out, before returning to the first team at Tranmere in December 2010.

He was released by Man City at the end of the 2011–12 season. However, weeks later he rejoined the Manchester City squad, but was again released by the club after signing former England international Richard Wright on transfer deadline day. He officially left the club on 7 December and told the Manchester City website he hopes to join a team in England or the Scandinavian Region in January 2013.

In early April 2013, Nielsen signed for Silkeborg of the Danish Superliga. Nielsen immediately debuted for the club on 8 April 2013, a 1–0 defeat to Aalborg.

On 3 July 2013, Nielsen signed a 2-year deal with Motherwell where he had previously spent six months on loan in 2008. He left Motherwell on 4 March 2015, by mutual consent.

On 4 April 2015, Nielsen signed a one-year contract with the Icelandic club Stjarnan. He made his debut for them on 27 April, in an Icelandic Super Cup win over KR. At the end of the 2015 season, Nielsen was elected player of the year for Stjarnan both by the players and the management. On 28 October 2015, Nielsen signed a three-year contract with 2015 Icelandic champions FH.

== International career ==
Nielsen made his international debut for the Faroe Islands after starting in a 2–1 win over Iceland on 22 March 2009.

On 3 June 2016, he captained the team for the first time in a 2–0 friendly defeat against Kosovo in Frankfurt.

== Honours ==
FH

- Úrvalsdeild: 2016

Stjarnan

- Icelandic Super Cup: 2015

== Career statistics ==
As of match played 21 October 2019.

Club statistics
Club	Season	League			National Cup		League Cup		Europe		Other		Total	
Club	Season	Division	Apps	Goals	Apps	Goals	Apps	Goals	Apps	Goals	Apps	Goals	Apps	Goals
Manchester City	2009–10	Premier League	1	0	0	0	0	0	—		—		1	0
Motherwell (loan)	2008–09	Scottish Premier League	0	0	—		0	0	0	0	—		0	0
Wrexham (loan)	2008–09	Conference Premier	4	0	—		—		—		—		4	0
Tranmere Rovers (loan)	2010–11	League One	2	0	0	0	0	0	—		1 (Note: Appearances in Football League Trophy.)	0	3	0
Silkeborg	2012–13	Danish Superliga	8	0	—		—		—		—		8	0
Motherwell	2013–14	Scottish Premiership	19	0	1	0	2	0	1 (Note: Appearance in Europa League.)	0	—		23	0
Motherwell	2014–15	Scottish Premiership	0	0	0	0	0	0	0	0	—		0	0
Motherwell	Motherwell total		19	0	1	0	2	0	1	0	—		23	0
Stjarnan	2015	Úrvalsdeild	20	0	1	0	0	0	2 (Note: Appearances in Champions League.)	0	1 (Note: Appearance in Icelandic Super Cup.)	0	24	0
FH	2016	Úrvalsdeild	22	0	3	0	3	0	2	0	1 (Note: 1 appearance in Fótbolti.net Cup.)	0	31	0
FH	2017	Úrvalsdeild	21	0	1	0	3	0	6 (Note: 4 appearances in Champions League, 2 appearances in Europa League.)	0	1	0	32	0
FH	2018	Úrvalsdeild	22	0	1	0	4	0	0	0	4	0	31	0
FH	2019	Úrvalsdeild	3	0	1	0	2	0	0	0	0	0	6	0
FH	FH Total		68	0	6	0	12	0	8	0	6	0	100	0
Career total			122	0	7	0	12	0	11	0	8	0	163	0
