= Zaine Francis-Angol =

Footballer (born 1993)

Personal information
- Full name: Zaine Sebastian Francis-Angol
- Date of birth: 30 June 1993 (age 33)
- Place of birth: Waltham Forest, England
- Height: 5 ft 8 in (1.73 m)
- Positions: Left-back; left winger

Youth career
- Afewee Academy
- –2011: Tottenham Hotspur

Senior career*
| Years | Team | Apps | (Gls) |
| 2011–2015 | Motherwell | 66 | (3) |
| 2015–2017 | Kidderminster Harriers | 60 | (1) |
| 2017–2019 | AFC Fylde | 85 | (2) |
| 2019–2020 | Accrington Stanley | 5 | (0) |
| 2020–2021 | Boreham Wood | 16 | (0) |
| 2021–2022 | Hartlepool United | 20 | (0) |
| 2022 | → Stockport County (loan) | 2 | (0) |
| 2022–2023 | Oldham Athletic | 7 | (0) |
| 2023–2024 | Buxton | 22 | (0) |

International career^{‡}
| 2012– | Antigua and Barbuda | 25 | (0) |
- * Club domestic league appearances and goals as of 22:04, 21 April 2024 (UTC) ‡ National team caps and goals as of 01:01, 22 October 2023 (UTC)

Zaine Sebastian Francis-Angol (born 30 June 1993) is a professional footballer who plays as a left-back or left winger.

Born in England, he plays for the Antigua and Barbuda national team at international level.

== Club career ==
Francis-Angol was signed by the Motherwell club in July 2011 after he started his career playing for the Tottenham Hotspur Reserves. He was a regular for the Motherwell Under 19's during 2011–12, but did not make a first team appearance. His performances for the Under 19's resulted in him being awarded with a new contract.

He made his debut for the first-team as a substitute in a 3–0 defeat against Panathinaikos in the UEFA Champions League Third qualifying round on 8 August 2012.

On 18 January 2013, Francis-Angol signed a new contract with Motherwell, keeping him at Fir Park until Summer 2015. He scored his first goal for the club in a 5–1 win over Partick Thistle on 29 December 2013.

On 2 June 2015, Motherwell announced that Francis-Angol was amongst the players leaving the club, with his contract having expired.

On 2 October 2015, Francis-Angol signed for Kidderminster Harriers on a short-term deal until January 2016. Francis-Angol scored on his first start for the club in a 1–1 home draw against Boreham Wood.

On 6 June 2017, Francis-Angol joined National League side AFC Fylde on a two-and-a-half-year deal. In July 2019, he joined Accrington Stanley on a one-year deal. On 24 June 2020 it was announced Francis-Angol would be leaving Accrington Stanley. After being released by Accrington Stanley, Francis-Angol joined Boreham Wood on 2 September 2020.

He joined Hartlepool United on 22 April 2021. Francis-Angol appeared as a substitute in the 2021 National League play-off final as Hartlepool were promoted back to the Football League. Following the departure of Dave Challinor, Francis-Angol struggled for game time under Graeme Lee and on 24 March 2022, Francis-Angol signed for Stockport County on loan, joining his former manager Dave Challinor. At the end of the 2021–22, Francis-Angol was released by Hartlepool.

On 2 July 2022, Francis-Angol joined recently relegated National League club Oldham Athletic on a one-year contract. He was released after one season by the club.

== International career ==
On 31 August 2012, London-born Francis-Angol was given a call-up to the Antigua and Barbuda squad for the upcoming World Cup qualifier against Guatemala and made his international debut by starting in the 3–1 loss. He qualifies due to his mother being from Antigua and Barbuda.

== Career statistics ==
=== Club ===
As of 27 January 2024

Appearances and goals by club, season and competition
| Club | Season | League | | | National Cup | | League Cup | | Other | | Total | |
| Club | Season | Division | Apps | Goals | Apps | Goals | Apps | Goals | Apps | Goals | Apps | Goals |
|---|---|---|---|---|---|---|---|---|---|---|---|---|
| Motherwell | 2012–13 | Scottish Premier League | 22 | 0 | 2 | 0 | 1 | 0 | 2 (Note: One appearance in the Champions League and one in the Europa League) | 0 | 27 | 0 |
| Motherwell | 2013–14 | Scottish Premiership | 33 | 3 | 1 | 0 | 2 | 0 | 2 (Note: Appearances in the Europa League) | 0 | 38 | 3 |
| Motherwell | 2014–15 | Scottish Premiership | 11 | 0 | 1 | 0 | 0 | 0 | 1 | 0 | 13 | 0 |
| Motherwell | Total | | 66 | 3 | 4 | 0 | 3 | 0 | 5 | 0 | 78 | 3 |
| Kidderminster Harriers | 2015–16 | National League | 26 | 1 | 1 | 0 | — | | 1 (Note: Appearance in the FA Trophy) | 0 | 28 | 1 |
| Kidderminster Harriers | 2016–17 | National League North | 34 | 0 | 4 | 0 | — | | 4 | 0 | 42 | 0 |
| Kidderminster Harriers | Total | | 60 | 1 | 5 | 0 | — | | 5 | 0 | 70 | 1 |
| AFC Fylde | 2017–18 | National League | 43 | 2 | 4 | 0 | — | | 1 | 0 | 48 | 1 |
| AFC Fylde | 2018–19 | National League | 42 | 0 | 1 | 0 | — | | 11 | 0 | 54 | 0 |
| AFC Fylde | Total | | 85 | 2 | 5 | 0 | — | | 16 | 0 | 106 | 2 |
| Accrington Stanley | 2019–20 | League One | 5 | 0 | 0 | 0 | 0 | 0 | 1 | 0 | 6 | 0 |
| Boreham Wood | 2020–21 | National League | 15 | 0 | 2 | 0 | — | | 1 | 0 | 18 | 0 |
| Hartlepool United | 2020–21 | National League | 4 | 0 | 0 | 0 | — | | 2 | 0 | 6 | 0 |
| Hartlepool United | 2021–22 | League Two | 16 | 0 | 1 | 0 | 1 | 0 | 4 | 0 | 22 | 0 |
| Hartlepool United | Total | | 20 | 0 | 1 | 0 | 1 | 0 | 6 | 0 | 28 | 0 |
| Stockport County (loan) | 2021–22 | National League | 2 | 0 | 0 | 0 | 0 | 0 | 0 | 0 | 2 | 0 |
| Oldham Athletic | 2022–23 | National League | 7 | 0 | 1 | 0 | 0 | 0 | 0 | 0 | 8 | 0 |
| Buxton | 2023–24 | National League North | 22 | 0 | 0 | 0 | 0 | 0 | 0 | 0 | 22 | 0 |
| Career total | | | 282 | 6 | 18 | 0 | 4 | 0 | 34 | 0 | 338 | 6 |

=== International ===
As of match played 23 March 2025

Appearances and goals by national team and year
| National team | Year | Apps | Goals |
|---|---|---|---|
| Antigua and Barbuda | 2012 | 4 | 0 |
| Antigua and Barbuda | 2013 | 0 | 0 |
| Antigua and Barbuda | 2014 | 6 | 0 |
| Antigua and Barbuda | 2015 | 2 | 0 |
| Antigua and Barbuda | 2016 | 6 | 0 |
| Antigua and Barbuda | 2017 | 0 | 0 |
| Antigua and Barbuda | 2018 | 4 | 0 |
| Antigua and Barbuda | 2019 | 0 | 0 |
| Antigua and Barbuda | 2020 | 0 | 0 |
| Antigua and Barbuda | 2021 | 1 | 0 |
| Antigua and Barbuda | 2022 | 2 | 0 |
| Antigua and Barbuda | 2023 | 3 | 0 |
| Total | | 28 | 0 |

== Honours ==
AFC Fylde

- FA Trophy: 2018–19

Hartlepool United

- National League play-offs: 2021
