= Stephen McManus =

Scottish footballer (born 1982)

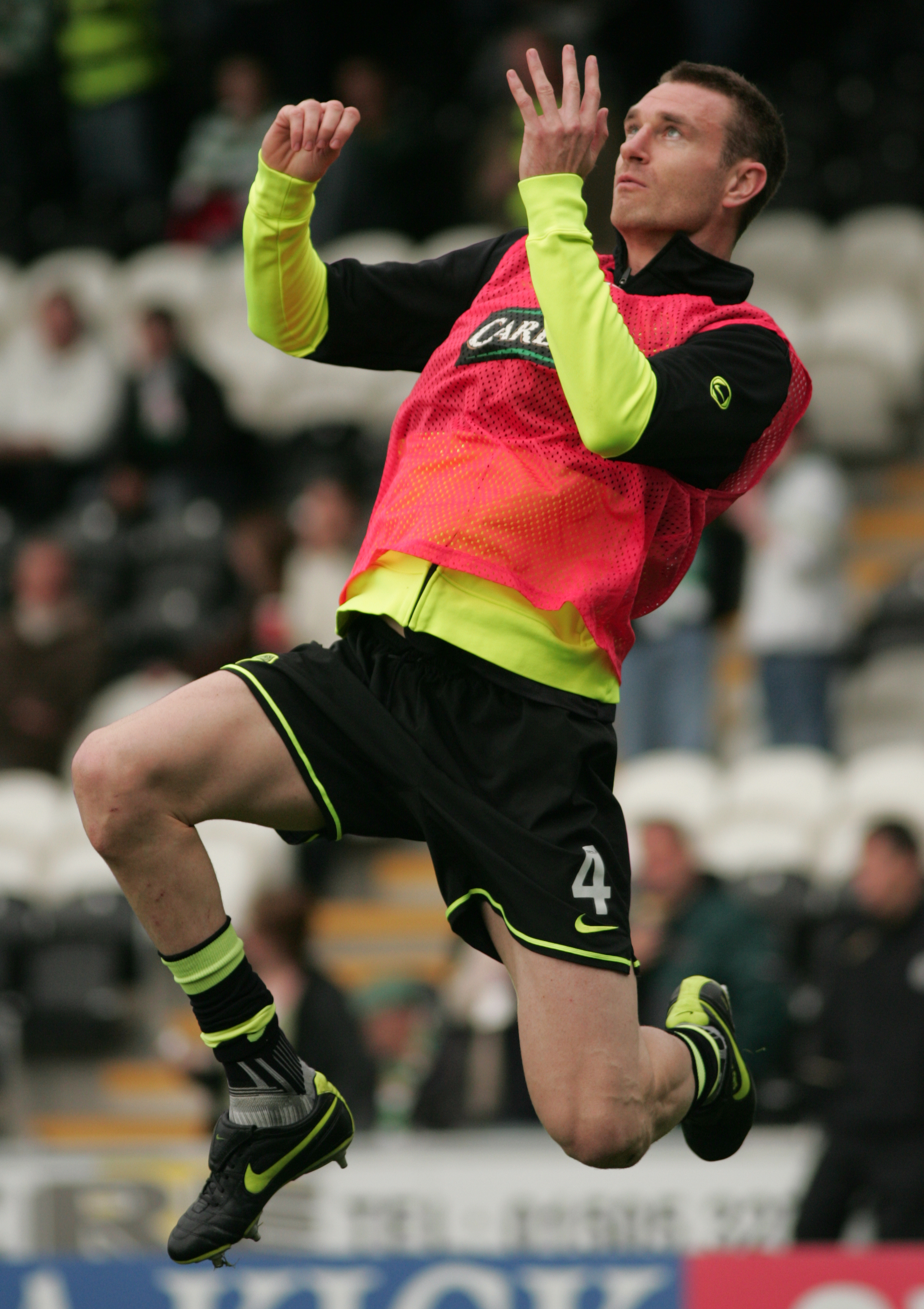
- McManus playing for Celtic in 2009

Personal information
- Full name: Stephen David McManus
- Date of birth: 10 September 1982 (age 44)
- Place of birth: Bothwell, Scotland
- Height: 6 ft 2 in (1.88 m)
- Position: Centre-back

Team information
- Current team: Celtic B (coach)

Youth career
- 1997–2003: Celtic

Senior career*
Years	Team	Apps	(Gls)
2003–2010	Celtic	150	(17)
2010	→ Middlesbrough (loan)	16	(1)
2010–2013	Middlesbrough	54	(1)
2012	→ Bristol City (loan)	6	(0)
2012–2013	→ Bristol City (loan)	11	(1)
2013–2017	Motherwell	135	(6)
Total		372	(26)

International career
2006–2010	Scotland	26	(2)

Managerial career
- 2019–2021: Celtic U18
- * Club domestic league appearances and goals

Stephen David McManus (born 10 September 1982) is a Scottish professional football coach and former player who is a first-team coach at Scottish Premiership club Celtic.

McManus, who played as a centre-back, was a product of Celtic's youth academy and rose through the ranks to become first team captain ahead of the 2007–08 season. He held this position until his move to Middlesbrough in 2010. After two loan spells with Bristol City, McManus finished his career with four seasons at Motherwell.

McManus also captained the Scotland national team, and made 26 international appearances between 2006 and 2010.

McManus retired from playing in 2017 and became a coach.

== Club career ==
=== Celtic ===
McManus came through the ranks at Celtic and signed a professional contract on the same day as fellow defender John Kennedy. He made his debut for the first team, under Martin O'Neill, in the 2003–04 season against Hibernian, and finished that season with five league appearances as Celtic won the title. He later established himself as first choice central defender at Celtic during Gordon Strachan's managerial reign.

In the 2005–06 season, McManus scored eight goals (seven of which came in the League). He was made captain for the first league game of the 2006–07 season, in the match against Kilmarnock due to regular club captain Neil Lennon being suspended. Since that game he repeatedly deputised as Celtic captain throughout the 2006–07 season. After Lennon left Celtic to join Nottingham Forest, McManus was announced as Celtic's new captain on 31 July 2007 and signed a four-year contract. He said:

"To be given the captaincy of Celtic is a tremendous honour. It is undoubtedly one of the highlights of my career so far. I'm proud to follow in the footsteps of so many great Celtic captains from the past and I hope that I will be able to achieve as much success as they have over the years."

On 3 October 2007, McManus scored to put Celtic a goal ahead against Milan at Celtic Park in the group stages of the UEFA Champions League. The match ended 2–1 in Celtic's favour with Kaká equalising for Milan before Scott McDonald scored a late winner for Celtic.

McManus lifted his first trophy as Celtic skipper on 22 May 2008, when Celtic won the 2007–08 SPL Championship following a 1–0 win over Dundee United at Tannadice Park on the last day of the season. Before the beginning of the 2008–09 SPL Championship it was announced that McManus would wear the No.4 shirt, after its previous owner Adam Virgo left the club in July 2008.

McManus fell out of favour under new manager Tony Mowbray, however, making only 14 appearances in the first part of the 2009–10 season.

=== Middlesbrough ===
McManus was loaned by Celtic to Middlesbrough for the second half of the 2009–10 season. This meant that McManus linked up again with Gordon Strachan, who signed four other Celtic players during the January 2010 transfer window. McManus received the man of the match award in his Middlesbrough debut against Ipswich Town. He scored his first goal for the club in a 2–0 win over Plymouth Argyle on 5 April 2010.

On 13 July 2010, McManus completed a £1.5 million move to the Teesside club signing a 3-year contract. McManus scored his second goal for Middlesbrough against Leicester City on 2 April 2011, his goal coming in the 94th minute to level the game at 3–3. At the end of the 2012–13 season, McManus was not offered a new contract and left the club.

=== Bristol City ===
McManus signed for Bristol City on loan until the end of the season on 14 February 2012 and made his debut at home in the 2–2 draw against Crystal Palace the same day. He was recalled on 28 March, due to injury worries to Matthew Bates and Seb Hines following the match against Bristol City (McManus did not play against Boro). He then returned to Bristol City for a second loan spell the following season. His first and only goal for the club came in a 4–2 win over Peterborough United on 29 December 2012.

=== Motherwell ===
On 15 July 2013, McManus signed a one-year deal with Scottish Premiership side Motherwell. He made his competitive debut for Motherwell in a home Europa League match against Russian side Kuban Krasnodar. Motherwell lost the match 2–0. His first goal for the club came in a 1–0 win over Hibernian on 3 November 2013. McManus made 42 appearances for Motherwell during the 2013–14 season, after which he signed a new two-year contract with the club.

On 14 August 2017, it was announced that McManus had decided to retire from playing football.

== International career ==
McManus earned his first cap at international level for Scotland on 11 October 2006, coming on as a substitute in the 2–0 defeat to Ukraine at the Olympic Stadium in Kyiv. McManus scored his first goal for Scotland in a 3–1 win against Lithuania on 8 September 2007, turning a Shaun Maloney cross into the net to put Scotland 2–1 up. He captained Scotland for the first time on 26 March 2008 in a friendly match against Croatia at Hampden Park, in the absence of regular captain Barry Ferguson. The game finished 1–1.

On 10 September 2008, McManus was sent off for a deliberate handball in a FIFA World Cup qualifier against Iceland at Laugardalsvöllur in Reykjavík. He used his right hand to tip the crossed ball over the crossbar to stop approaching Icelandic striker Heiðar Helguson from scoring a goal, while Scotland were leading 2–0. The penalty kick was converted to make the score 2–1, which was the final score. On 7 September 2010 McManus scored a dramatic 97th minute winning header for Scotland in their 2–1 victory over Liechtenstein. His 26th and final cap came in October 2010, in a 3–2 defeat to Spain.

== Coaching career ==
After retiring in 2017, McManus took a coaching position with Motherwell. He returned to Celtic in January 2019 as a coach of their under-18 team.

== Personal life ==
McManus was born in Hamilton, Lanarkshire. He attended Holy Cross RC Secondary School in Hamilton, the school which international and former club teammate Paul Hartley also attended. McManus and Hartley used to have a competition at training to see who could name the most teachers and the loser picked up all the balls. In 2008, after a Champions League game against Barcelona, McManus swapped jerseys with Leo Messi but has since lost it.

His nickname is "Mick" because he shares his surname with 1970s professional wrestler Mick McManus. His second cousin Kris Doolan was also a footballer, mainly for Partick Thistle.

== Career statistics ==
=== Club ===
Appearances and goals by club, season and competition
Club	Season	League			National cup		League cup		Other		Total	
Club	Season	Division	App	Goals	App	Goals	App	Goals	App	Goals	App	Goals
Celtic	2003–04	Scottish Premier League	5	0	0	0	0	0	0	0	5	0
Celtic	2004–05	Scottish Premier League	2	0	0	0	1	1	1 (Note: Appearances in UEFA Champions League)	0	4	1
Celtic	2005–06	Scottish Premier League	36	7	1	0	4	0	1	1	42	8
Celtic	2006–07	Scottish Premier League	31	2	4	0	1	0	8	0	44	2
Celtic	2007–08	Scottish Premier League	37	4	4	0	2	0	10	1	53	5
Celtic	2008–09	Scottish Premier League	31	4	2	0	2	0	6	0	41	4
Celtic	2009–10	Scottish Premier League	8	0	0	0	2	0	4 (Note: Appearances in UEFA Europa League)	0	14	0
Celtic	Total		150	17	11	0	12	1	30	2	203	20
Middlesbrough (loan)	2009–10	Championship	16	1	0	0	0	0	0	0	16	1
Middlesbrough	2010–11	Championship	24	1	0	0	1	0	0	0	25	1
Middlesbrough	2011–12	Championship	23	0	0	0	3	0	0	0	26	0
Middlesbrough	2012–13	Championship	7	0	1	0	2	0	0	0	10	0
Middlesbrough	Total		54	1	1	0	6	0	0	0	61	1
Bristol City (loan)	2011–12	Championship	6	0	0	0	0	0	0	0	6	0
Bristol City (loan)	2012–13	Championship	11	1	0	0	0	0	0	0	11	1
Motherwell	2013–14	Scottish Premiership	37	4	1	0	2	0	2	0	42	4
Motherwell	2014–15	Scottish Premiership	36	1	1	0	1	0	4 (Note: Two appearances in UEFA Europa League; two appearances, one goal in relegation play-offs)	1	42	2
Motherwell	2015–16	Scottish Premiership	37	1	2	0	1	0	0	0	40	1
Motherwell	2016–17	Scottish Premiership	25	0	1	0	5	0	0	0	31	0
Motherwell	2017–18	Scottish Premiership	0	0	0	0	1	0	0	0	1	0
Motherwell	Total		135	6	5	0	10	0	6	1	156	7
Career total			372	26	17	0	28	1	36	3	453	30

=== International ===
Appearances and goals by national team and year
National team	Year	Apps	Goals
Scotland	2006	1	0
Scotland	2007	10	1
Scotland	2008	6	0
Scotland	2009	5	0
Scotland	2010	4	1
Total		26	2

Scores and results list Scotland's goal tally first, score column indicates score after each McManus goal.

List of international goals scored by Stephen McManus
No.	Date	Venue	Opponent	Score	Result	Competition
1	8 September 2007	Hampden Park, Glasgow, Scotland	Lithuania	2–1	3–1	UEFA Euro 2008 qualifying
2	7 September 2010	Hampden Park, Glasgow, Scotland	Liechtenstein	2–1	2–1	UEFA Euro 2012 qualifying

== Honours ==
Celtic

- Scottish Premier League: 2005–06, 2006–07, 2007–08
- Scottish Cup: 2004–05, 2006–07
- Scottish League Cup: 2005–06, 2008–09

Scotland U16

- Victory Shield: 1997–98

== See also ==
- List of Scotland national football team captains
