= Jack Leitch =

Scottish footballer

Personal information
- Date of birth: 17 July 1995 (age 31)
- Place of birth: Motherwell, Scotland
- Height: 1.73 m (5 ft 8 in)
- Position: Midfielder

Team information
- Current team: East Kilbride
- Number: 6

Youth career
- 2012–2015: Motherwell

Senior career*
Years	Team	Apps	(Gls)
2013–2016	Motherwell	27	(0)
2016–2017	Airdrieonians	31	(2)
2017–2020	Peterhead	75	(18)
2020–2024	Stirling Albion	107	(14)
2024–	East Kilbride	51	(24)
- * Club domestic league appearances and goals as of 4 May 2026

Jack Leitch (born 17 July 1995) is a Scottish footballer who plays for Scottish League One club East Kilbride. A midfielder, he started his career with Motherwell and was a product of the Motherwell Academy. In 2016, he moved to Airdrieonians and had one season with the Diamonds. Leitch then played for Peterhead for three seasons before signing for Stirling Albion in 2020. Four years on in July 2024 he joined Lowland League side East Kilbride.

== Career ==
=== Motherwell ===
On 30 November 2013, Leitch made his debut for Motherwell as a substitute in a surprise 1–0 defeat against Lanarkshire derby opponents Albion Rovers in the Scottish Cup. His first start came on 1 March 2014, in a 4–1 win against Heart of Midlothian. On 4 June 2014, Leitch signed a new two-year contract at Motherwell.

Leitch missed a large part of the 2014–15 season after suffering a cruciate ligament injury in an under-20 match against St Johnstone in October 2014. He was released by the club at the end of the 2015–16 season after his contract expired.

=== Airdrieonians ===
On 2 September 2016, Leitch signed for Airdrieonians, joining permanently having already played for the club as a trialist.

=== Peterhead ===
Leitch signed a one-year contract with Scottish League Two club Peterhead on 4 August 2017. On 4 May 2019, he scored twice as Peterhead won 2–0 away to Queen's Park at Hampden, a result which clinched the League Two title.

In June 2019, Leitch signed a new contract with Peterhead for the 2019–20 season.

== Career statistics ==
As of 3 November 2019

Appearances and goals by club, season and competition
Club	Season	League			Cup		League Cup		Other		Total	
Club	Season	Division	Apps	Goals	Apps	Goals	Apps	Goals	Apps	Goals	Apps	Goals
Motherwell	2013–14	Scottish Premiership	9	0	1	0	0	0	0	0	10	0
Motherwell	2014–15	Scottish Premiership	7	0	0	0	1	0	1 (Note: Appearance in the Europa League)	0	9	0
Motherwell	2015–16	Scottish Premiership	11	0	0	0	2	0	0	0	13	0
Motherwell	Total		27	0	1	0	3	0	1	0	32	0
Airdrieonians	2016–17	Scottish League One	31	2	1	0	0	0	3 (Note: One appearance in the Scottish Challenge Cup and two in the Championship play-offs)	0	35	2
Peterhead	2017–18	Scottish League Two	32	5	3	1	0	0	6 (Note: Two appearances in the Scottish Challenge Cup and four in the League One play-offs)	0	41	6
Peterhead	2018–19	Scottish League Two	34	11	3	0	4	0	2 (Note: Appearances in the Scottish Challenge Cup)	1	43	12
Peterhead	2019–20	Scottish League One	9	2	0	0	4	0	1	0	14	2
Peterhead	Total		75	18	6	1	8	0	9	1	98	20
Career total			133	20	8	1	11	0	13	1	165	22

== Honours ==
Peterhead

- Scottish League Two: 2018–19

== Personal life ==
Leitch is the eldest son of former Motherwell captain Scott Leitch.
