= Fraser Kerr =

Scottish footballer

Personal information
- Date of birth: 17 January 1993 (age 33)
- Place of birth: Rutherglen, Scotland
- Height: 6 ft 2 in (1.88 m)
- Position: Centre back

Youth career
- 2003–2009: Motherwell
- 2009–2011: Birmingham City

Senior career*
Years	Team	Apps	(Gls)
2011–2013	Birmingham City	0	(0)
2012–2013	→ Motherwell (loan)	14	(0)
2013–2015	Motherwell	40	(1)
2015–2016	Cowdenbeath	13	(0)
2016–2017	Stenhousemuir	32	(3)
2017–2019	Gateshead	62	(4)
2019–2020	Hartlepool United	32	(0)
2020–2021	Torquay United	7	(0)
2021–2022	Chesterfield	36	(2)
2022–2023	York City	24	(2)
2023–2024	AFC Telford United	30	(1)

International career
2008	Scotland U16	4	(0)
2009	Scotland U17	6	(1)
2010–2011	Scotland U19	4	(0)
2012–2013	Scotland U21	3	(0)
- * Club domestic league appearances and goals as of 15:36, 11 May 2023 (UTC)

Fraser Kerr (born 17 January 1993) is a Scottish footballer who plays as a centre back. Kerr has represented his country at levels from under-16 to under-21.

Kerr began his professional career at Premier League side Birmingham City in 2011, having progressed through the club's youth ranks. He never made an appearance for the club, and spent the 2012–13 season on loan to Scottish Premier League side Motherwell, where he made 19 appearances. He was released by Birmingham City in July 2013, having returned from his loan spell. Kerr then moved to Motherwell on a permanent basis, making 40 league appearances in two seasons. He spent a season with Cowdenbeath before moving to Stenhousemuir in June 2016. The following year, he returned to England, where he played non-league football for Gateshead, Hartlepool United, Torquay United, Chesterfield and York City. In July 2023 Kerr signed for National League North club AFC Telford United.

== Club career ==
=== Birmingham City ===
Kerr was born in Rutherglen, South Lanarkshire, and attended Calderglen High School, in East Kilbride. He began his football career as a schoolboy with Motherwell. Spotted playing for the Scotland under-16 team in the televised Victory Shield, he moved to England at the age of 16 to begin a two-year scholarship in Birmingham City's youth academy.

Much to his surprise, Kerr was included as defensive cover in the first-team squad for a 2010 pre-season tour to Hong Kong and China. He played in only one of the games, as a 76th-minute substitute for Stephen Carr in the 2–0 win against Chinese Super League team Liaoning Whowin. He signed his first professional contract, of two-and-a-half years, in January 2011. Academy manager Terry Westley described the "tall and gangly" Kerr as having "good awareness on the ball", but said that it was "his change of pace that really convinced us to bring him here", comparing him with England international Matthew Upson at a similar age.

His first competitive involvement with the first team came in January 2011, when named on the substitutes' bench for the fourth-round FA Cup tie against Coventry City. He was part of the Birmingham squad for their 2011 pre-season visit to Ireland, and played the second half of the friendly against Cork City. Named in the "B" list for Birmingham's 2011–12 Europa League campaign, he was an unused substitute for the play-off round second leg against CD Nacional.

In August 2012, Kerr rejoined Motherwell on a six-month loan after a successful trial. He made his debut as a substitute in a 2–1 win over Kilmarnock in the Scottish Premier League on 18 August. The loan was later extended to last for the season. In April, Birmingham confirmed that his contract would not be renewed when it expired at the end of the season.

=== Motherwell ===
On 1 July 2013, after his Birmingham contract expired, Kerr signed a two-year permanent deal with Motherwell. On 31 May 2015, Kerr was involved in an incident in Fir Park following Motherwell's 3–0, 6–1 on aggregate, victory against Rangers that secured their place in the Scottish Premiership. After a clash between players Bilel Mohsni (Rangers) and Lee Erwin (Motherwell), Kerr got involved to defend teammate Erwin. Both teams' managers described the event as both "unacceptable" and "disgraceful". Kerr was released by Motherwell at the end of the 2014–15 season.

=== Cowdenbeath and Stenhousemuir ===
Kerr signed for Cowdenbeath in November 2015, where he spent one season before signing for Scottish League One side Stenhousemuir in June 2016. At the end of the 2016–17 season Kerr was released following the club's relegation to Scottish League Two.

=== Non-League football ===
Kerr returned to English football in July 2017, signing a one-year contract with National League club Gateshead. On 27 February 2019, Kerr signed for Hartlepool United for an undisclosed fee. He was released at the end of the 2019–20 season.

Kerr joined Torquay United on a free transfer in July 2020. He made seven National League appearances, all in December, before moving closer to his family home by joining Chesterfield on 2 March 2021 until the end of the season; Chesterfield's Scott Boden had moved on loan in the other direction. He made his debut that evening at right-sided centre-back, played the whole of a 1–0 win at home to Eastleigh and, according to the Derbyshire Times, "A couple of crunching tackles in the first half would have drawn applause had fans been at the Technique. He was strong in the air and played the ball out from the back." Kerr was released at the end of the 2021–22 season, and signed for York City, newly promoted to the National League. He was released by York after one season, and joined AFC Telford United in July 2023. Kerr left the club at the end of the 2023/24 season to move abroad.

== International career ==
Kerr made his debut for the Scotland under-16 team in August 2008 in a friendly match against a Jersey team, and played twice in that year's Victory Shield. The following year he made six appearances for Scotland's under-17s, including two in the qualifying round of the 2010 European under-17 championships, and scored his first international goal, against Finland in the Nordic Tournament. As a 17-year-old, Kerr played two friendlies for Scotland at under-19 level in 2010, and appeared in five more matches in 2011, which included three European under-19 championships qualifiers. Kerr made his under-21 debut in the Marbella Cup in October 2012.

== Career statistics ==
As of match played 28 February 2023

Appearances and goals by club, season and competition
Club	Season	League			National cup (Note: Includes FA Cup, Scottish Cup)		League cup (Note: Includes Football League Cup, Scottish League Cup)		Other		Total	
Club	Season	Division	Apps	Goals	Apps	Goals	Apps	Goals	Apps	Goals	Apps	Goals
Birmingham City	2011–12	Championship	0	0	0	0	0	0	0	0	0	0
Motherwell	2012–13	Scottish Premier League	14	0	2	0	1	0	2 (Note: Appearances in UEFA Europa League)	0	19	0
Motherwell	2013–14	Scottish Premiership	19	0	1	0	0	0	2	0	22	0
Motherwell	2014–15	Scottish Premiership	21	1	1	0	1	0	2	0	25	1
Motherwell	Total		54	1	4	0	2	0	6	0	66	1
Cowdenbeath	2015–16	Scottish League One	13	0	3	0	0	0	0	0	16	0
Stenhousemuir	2016–17	Scottish League One	32	3	3	1	4	0	2 (Note: Appearances in Scottish Challenge Cup)	0	41	4
Gateshead	2017–18	National League	27	1	3	0	—		8 (Note: Appearance(s) in FA Trophy)	0	38	1
Gateshead	2018–19	National League	35	3	2	0	—		1	0	38	3
Gateshead	Total		62	4	5	0	—		9	0	76	4
Hartlepool United	2018–19	National League	9	0	—		—		—		9	0
Hartlepool United	2019–20	National League	23	0	5	0	—		1	0	29	0
Hartlepool United	Total		32	0	5	0	—		1	0	38	0
Torquay United	2020–21	National League	7	0	0	0	—		1	0	8	0
Chesterfield	2020–21	National League	16	1	—		—		0	0	16	1
Chesterfield	2021–22	National League	20	1	4	0	—		0	0	24	1
Chesterfield	Total		36	2	4	0	—		0	0	40	2
York City	2022–23	National League	24	2	1	0	—		2	1	27	3
Career total			260	12	25	1	6	0	21	1	312	14
