= 2014–15 Ayr United F.C. season =

Ayr United
2014–15 season
- Chairman: Lachlan Cameron
- Manager: Mark Roberts (until 15 December); Andy Millen (Interim); Ian McCall (from 5 January)
- Stadium: Somerset Park
- League One: Eighth Place
- Challenge Cup: First Round
- League Cup: Second Round
- Scottish Cup: Third Round
- Top goalscorer: League: Alan Forrest (9); All: Alan Forrest (9)
- Highest home attendance: 1,617 vs Greenock Morton, League One, 9 August 2014
- Lowest home attendance: 646 vs Stenhousemuir, League One, 13 December 2014
- Average home league attendance: 1,122
Home colours	Away colours

The 2014–15 season was Ayr United's 2nd season in League One and their 3rd consecutive season in the third-tier of Scottish football. Ayr also competed in the Scottish Cup, League Cup and the Challenge Cup.

== Summary ==
=== Management ===
Ayr began the season under the management of Mark Roberts, who continued to operate in a player-manager role. On 15 December, Roberts was removed from his position as manager after a poor run of form, with his assistant Andy Millen placed in temporary charge. On 5 January 2015, Ian McCall was appointed as Ayr United's new manager.

== Preseason ==
Win Draw Loss

16 July 2014 Friendly	Queen's Park	2 – 3	Ayr United	Glasgow

19 July 2014 Friendly	Ayr United	1 – 1	(Northern Ireland) Crusaders	Somerset Park, Ayr
14:00	McLaughlin 22'	Ayr United Report	Snoddy 90'

21 July 2014 Friendly	Hurlford United	3 – 5	Ayr United	Blair Park, Hurlford
19:30	Robertson 60', 85' (pen.); Cochrane 80'	Ayr United Report	McLaughlin 10' (pen.), 43'; Donnelly 62'; McGill 71'; Forrest 81'

=== Scottish League One ===
9 August 2014 Match 1	Ayr United	1 – 0	Greenock Morton	Somerset Park, Ayr
15:00	Donnelly 79'	Report		Attendance: 1,617; Referee: Craig Charleston

16 August 2014 Match 2	Stirling Albion	1 – 3	Ayr United	Forthbank Stadium, Stirling
15:00	G Smith 66' (pen.)	Ayr United Report	Forrest 5', 56'; Gilmour 69'	Attendance: 823; Referee: Mat Northcroft

23 August 2014 Match 3	Ayr United	2 – 0	Forfar Athletic	Somerset Park, Ayr
15:00	McLaughlin 85', 89' (pen.)	Ayr United Report		Attendance: 1,156; Referee: Nick Walsh

30 August 2014 Match 4	Stenhousemuir	1 – 1	Ayr United	Ochilview Park, Stenhousemuir
15:00	Grehan 26'	Ayr United Report	Donnelly 12'	Attendance: 669; Referee: John McKendrick

13 September 2014 Match 5	Ayr United	0 – 2	Stranraer	Somerset Park, Ayr
15:00	Murphy (yellow card) 71'	Report	Grant Gallagher 65'; Scott Rumsby (yellow card) 69'; Jamie Longworth 81'; Longridge (yellow card) 82'	Attendance: 1,414; Referee: (Scotland) Calum Murray

20 September 2014 Match 6	Brechin City	2 – 4	Ayr United	Glebe Park, Brechin
15:00	McLean (yellow card) 22'; Jackson (yellow card) 40'; Trouten 49'; Cameron (yellow card) 53' (yellow-red card); Jamie Masson 59'; McGormack (yellow card) 86'	Report	McLaughlin 53' (pen.) 86' (pen.); Beattie 73' 90+2'; Paul Slane (yellow card) 82'	Attendance: 537; Referee: (Scotland) Gavin Duncan

27 September 2014 Match 7	Ayr United	2 – 3	Airdrieonians	Somerset Park, Ayr
15:00	Donald (yellow card) 21'; Murphy 51'; Beattie 80'; Donnelly (yellow card) 90+2'	Report	Jim Lister 30' (yellow card) 74'; Luca Gasparotto 87'; Bain 90+1'; Liam Watt (yellow card) 90+6'	Attendance: 1,185; Referee: (Scotland) Matt Northcroft

4 October 2014 Match 8	Peterhead	2 – 0	Ayr United	Balmoor Stadium, Peterhead
15:00	Stevenson 56'; Ryan Strachan 62'	Report		Attendance: 506; Referee: (Scotland) Alan Muir

10 October 2014 Match 9	Ayr United	0 – 1	Dunfermline Athletic	Somerset Park, Ayr
19:45	Glimour (yellow card) 16'; Paul Slane (yellow card) 25'	Report	El Bakhtaoui 29' (yellow card) 30'; Falkingham (yellow card) 82'; Buchanan (yellow card) 87'	Attendance: 1,457; Referee: (Scotland) Euan Anderson

18 October 2014 Match 10	Greenock Morton	0 – 1	Ayr United	Cappielow, Greenock
15:00		Report	McLaughlin 36'; McKinlay (yellow card) 53'	Attendance: 1,744; Referee: (Scotland) Calum Murray

25 October 2014 Match 11	Ayr United	0 – 2	Brechin City	Somerset Park, Ayr
15:00		Report		Attendance: 1,060; Referee: (Scotland) Stephen Finnie

8 November 2014 Match 12	Stranraer	3 – 1	Ayr United	Stair Park, Stranraer
		Report		Attendance: 1,415; Referee: (Scotland) Gavin Duncan

22 November 2014 Match 13	Forfar Athletic	2 – 0	Ayr United	Station Park, Forfar
		Report		Attendance: 562; Referee: (Scotland) Andrew Dallas

6 December 2014 Match 14	Dunfermline Athletic	4 – 2	Ayr United	East End Park, Dunfermline
		Report		Attendance: 2,509; Referee: (Scotland) Euan Anderson

13 December 2014 Match 15	Ayr United	2 – 3	Stenhousemuir	Somerset Park, Ayr
		Report		Attendance: 646; Referee: (Scotland) Des Roache

20 December 2014 Match 16	Ayr United	2 – 2	Stirling Albion	Somerset Park, Ayr
		Report		Attendance: 880; Referee: (Scotland) John McKendrick

27 December 2014 Match 17	Airdrieonians	3 – 0	Ayr United	Excelsior Stadium, Airdrie
		Report		Attendance: 1,023; Referee: (Scotland) George Salmond

3 January 2015 Match 18	Ayr United	0 – 2	Stranraer	Somerset Park, Ayr
		Report		Attendance: 1,235; Referee: (Scotland) Alan Newlands

10 January 2015 Match 19	Brechin City	2 – 1	Ayr United	Glebe Park, Brechin
		Report		Attendance: 504; Referee: (Scotland) Mat Northcroft

17 January 2015 Match 20	Ayr United	1 – 1	Greenock Morton	Somerset Park, Ayr
		Report		Attendance: 1,217; Referee: (Scotland) Colin Steven

24 January 2015 Match 21	Stenhousemuir	1 – 1	Ayr United	Ochilview Park, Stenhousemuir
		Report		Attendance: 651; Referee: (Scotland) Gavin Ross

31 January 2015 Match 22	Ayr United	0 – 2	Dunfermline Athletic	Somerset Park, Ayr
		Report		Attendance: 1,149; Referee: (Scotland) Mat Northcroft

14 February 2015 Match 23	Stirling Albion	1 – 4	Ayr United	Forthbank Stadium, Stirling
		Report		Attendance: 785; Referee: (Scotland) Brian Colvin

21 February 2015 Match 24	Peterhead	2 – 0	Ayr United	Balmoor Stadium, Peterhead
		Report		Attendance: 560; Referee: (Scotland) Alan Newlands

28 February 2015 Match 25	Ayr United	1 – 0	Forfar Athletic	Somerset Park, Ayr
		Report		Attendance: 1,017; Referee: (Scotland) Stephen Finnie

3 March 2015 Match 26	Ayr United	3 – 3	Peterhead	Somerset Park, Ayr
		Report		Attendance: 693; Referee: (Scotland) Craig Charleston

7 March 2015 Match 27	Dunfermline Athletic	2 – 1	Ayr United	East End Park, Dunfermline
		Report		Attendance: 2,467; Referee: (Scotland) Nick Walsh

10 March 2015 Match 28	Ayr United	0 – 1	Airdrieonians	Somerset Park, Ayr
		Report		Attendance: 835; Referee: (Scotland) Colin Steven

14 March 2015 Match 29	Ayr United	0 – 0	Stenhousemuir	Somerset Park, Ayr
		Report		Attendance: 1,055; Referee: (Scotland) John McKendrick

21 March 2015 Match 30	Greenock Morton	2 – 1	Ayr United	Cappielow, Greenock
		Report		Attendance: 1,552; Referee: (Scotland) George Salmond

28 March 2015 Match 31	Ayr United	2 – 2	Brechin City	Somerset Park, Ayr
		Report		Attendance: 986; Referee: (Scotland) Andrew Dallas

4 April 2015 Match 32	Stranraer	1 – 0	Ayr United	Stair Park, Stranraer
		Report		Attendance: 1,010; Referee: (Scotland) Kevin Graham

11 April 2015 Match 33	Ayr United	2 – 4	Peterhead	Somerset Park, Ayr
		Report		Attendance: 998; Referee: (Scotland) Calum Murray

18 April 2015 Match 34	Airdrieonians	2 – 0	Ayr United	Excelsior Stadium, Airdrie
		Report		Attendance: 881; Referee: (Scotland) Craig Charleston

25 April 2015 Match 35	Ayr United	4 – 0	Stirling Albion	Somerset Park, Ayr
		Report		Attendance: 1,608; Referee: (Scotland) Alan Newlands

2 May 2015 Match 36	Forfar Athletic	1 – 3	Ayr United	Station Park, Forfar
		Report		Attendance: 1,916; Referee: (Scotland) Greg Aitken

=== Scottish Challenge Cup ===
27 July 2014 Round 1	Clyde	2 – 0	Ayr United	Broadwood Stadium, Cumbernauld
15:00	McManus 8'; Sweeney 29' (pen.)	Ayr United Report		Attendance: 689; Referee: Stephen Finnie

=== Scottish League Cup ===
2 August 2014 Round 1	East Stirlingshire	0 – 4	Ayr United	Ochilview Park, Stenhousemuir
19:45		Ayr United Report	Donnelly 50', 77'; McLaughlin 63' (pen.); Gilmour 90'	Attendance: 295; Referee: Greg Aitken

26 August 2014 Round 2	Kilmarnock	1 – 0	Ayr United	Rugby Park, Kilmarnock
19:45	McKenzie 69'			Attendance: 8,877; Referee: Craig Thomson

=== Scottish Cup ===
1 November 2014 Round 3	Ayr United	1 – 1	Alloa Athletic	Somerset Park, Ayr
15:00

11 November 2014 Round 3 (Replay)	Alloa Athletic	4 – 0	Ayr United	Indodrill Stadium, Alloa
19:45	Buchanan 24'; Meggatt 28'; Docherty 33', 60'	Report		Attendance: 420; Referee: Don Robertson

== Player statistics ==
=== Squad, appearance and goals ===
As of 2 May 2015

No.	Nat	Player	Total		League		Scottish Cup		League Cup		Challenge Cup	
No.	Nat	Player	Apps	Goals	Apps	Goals	Apps	Goals	Apps	Goals	Apps	Goals
Goalkeepers
	(Scotland)	David Hutton	41	0	36	0	2	0	2	0	1	0
	(Scotland)	Shaun Newman	0	0	0	0	0	0	0	0	0	0
Defenders
	(Scotland)	Adam Blakeman	14	2	12 (2)	2	0	0	0	0	0	0
	(Scotland)	Martyn Campbell	16	0	11 (2)	0	1	0	2	0	0	0
	(Scotland)	Adam Cummins	4	0	4	0	0	0	0	0	0	0
	(Scotland)	Nicky Devlin	41	2	36	2	2	0	2	0	1	0
	(Scotland)	Josh McArthur	2	0	0 (1)	0	0	0	0	0	1	0
	(Scotland)	John McArthur	1	0	0	0	1	0	0	0	0	0
	(Scotland)	Craig McCracken	4	0	1 (2)	0	0 (1)	0	0	0	0	0
	(Scotland)	Scott McKenna	12	0	12	0	0	0	0	0	0	0
	(Scotland)	Kevin McKinlay	17	0	13 (1)	0	0	0	2	0	0 (1)	0
	(Scotland)	Andrew Muir	9	0	1 (5)	0	2	0	0 (1)	0	0	0
	(Scotland)	Morgyn Neill	7	1	6 (1)	1	0	0	0	0	0	0
Midfielders
	(Republic of Ireland)	Peter Murphy	29	1	25	1	1	0	2	0	1	0
	(Scotland)	Robbie Crawford	23	1	18 (5)	1	0	0	0	0	0	0
	(Scotland)	Michael Donald	37	0	33 (1)	0	0	0	2	0	1	0
	(Scotland)	Alan Forrest	36	9	23 (8)	9	2	0	2	0	1	0
	(Scotland)	Brian Gilmour	36	3	24 (7)	2	2	0	2	1	1	0
	(Scotland)	Dale Keenan	2	0	2	0	0	0	0	0	0	0
	(Scotland)	Peter McGill	10	0	4 (2)	0	0 (1)	0	0 (2)	0	1	0
	(Scotland)	Jon-Paul McGovern	41	5	35 (1)	5	2	0	2	0	1	0
	(Scotland)	Scott McLaughlin	27	8	21 (1)	7	2	0	2	1	1	0
	(Scotland)	Craig Murray	14	0	13 (1)	0	0	0	0	0	0	0
	(Scotland)	Michael Wardrope	0	0	0	0	0	0	0	0	0	0
	(Scotland)	David Robertson	12	1	9 (3)	1	0	0	0	0	0	0
Forwards
	(Scotland)	Craig Beattie	30	6	14 (14)	6	0 (2)	0	0	0	0	0
	(Scotland)	Ryan Donnelly	29	5	19 (5)	2	2	1	2	2	1	0
	(Scotland)	Sean McKenzie	5	0	1 (3)	0	0 (1)	0	0	0	0	0
	(Scotland)	Ryan Nisbet	10	0	0 (10)	0	0	0	0	0	0	0
	(Scotland)	Jordan Preston	14	5	14	5	0	0	0	0	0	0
	(Scotland)	Mark Roberts	0	0	0	0	0	0	0	0	0	0
	(Scotland)	Dale Shirkie	18	0	1 (14)	0	1 (1)	0	0 (1)	0	0	0
	(Scotland)	Paul Slane	13	0	7 (4)	0	2	0	0	0	0	0

Players with a zero in every column only appeared as unused substitutes.

== Club statistics ==
=== League table ===
Pos	Team	Pld	W	D	L	GF	GA	GD	Pts	Promotion or relegation
6	Peterhead	36	14	9	13	51	54	−3	51	
7	Dunfermline Athletic	36	13	9	14	46	48	−2	48	
8	Ayr United	36	9	7	20	45	60	−15	34	
9	Stenhousemuir (O)	36	8	5	23	42	63	−21	29	Qualification for the League One play-offs
10	Stirling Albion (R)	36	4	8	24	35	84	−49	20	Relegation to League Two

Source: SPFL
Rules for classification: 1) points; 2) goal difference; 3) number of goals scored.
(O) Play-off winners; (R) Relegated

=== Overall ===
Competition	Started round	Current Position	Final Position	First match	Last match
Scottish League One	Matchday 1	Matchday 36	8th	9 August 2014	2 May 2015
Scottish Challenge Cup	1st Round	Eliminated	1st Round	25 July 2014	25 July 2014
Scottish Cup	3rd Round	Eliminated	3rd Round	1 November 2014	11 November 2014
League Cup	1st Round	Eliminated	2nd Round	2 August 2014	26 August 2014

Last Updated: 3 September 2015

==== Results summary ====
Overall								Home						Away					
Pld	W	D	L	GF	GA	GD	Pts	W	D	L	GF	GA	GD	W	D	L	GF	GA	GD
36	9	7	20	45	60	−15	34	4	5	9	22	28	−6	5	2	11	23	32	−9

Last updated: 3 Sept 2015.
Source: Competitive matches

==== Results by round ====
Round	1	2	3	4	5	6	7	8	9	10	11	12	13	14	15	16	17	18	19	20	21	22	23	24	25	26	27	28	29	30	31	32	33	34	35	36
Ground	H	A	H	A	H	A	H	A	H	A	H	A	H	A	A	H	H	A	H	A	H	A	H	H	A	A	H	A	H	A	H	A	H	A	H	A
Result	W	W	W	D	L	W	L	L	L	W	L	L	L	L	L	D	L	L	L	D	D	L	W	L	W	D	L	L	D	L	D	L	L	L	W	W
Position	1	1	1	1	2	1	3	3	5	4	5	6	6	7	7	8	8	9	9	9	9	9	9	9	9	9	8	9	9	9	8	8	8	9	8	8

Updated to match(es) played on 2 May 2020. Source:
A = Away; H = Home; W = Win; D = Draw; L = Loss

== Transfers ==
=== Players in ===
Player	From	Fee
(Scotland) Nicky Devlin	(Scotland) Stenhousemuir	Free
(Scotland) Kevin McKinlay	(Scotland) Stenhousemuir	Free
(Republic of Ireland) Peter Murphy	(England) Celtic Nation	Free
(Scotland) Jon-Paul McGovern	(Republic of Ireland) Derry City	Free
(Scotland) Craig Beattie	(Malta) Żebbuġ Rangers	Free
(Scotland) Ryan Donnelly	(Scotland) Albion Rovers	Free
(Scotland) Dale Shirkie	(Scotland) Motherwell	Free
(Scotland) Paul Slane	Unattached	Free
(Scotland) David Robertson	(Scotland) Livingston	Free

=== Players out ===
Player	To	Fee
(Scotland) Adam Hunter	Unattached	Free
(Scotland) Alan Lithgow	(Scotland) Stenhousemuir	Free
(Scotland) Jackson Longridge	(Scotland) Stranraer	Free
(Scotland) Craig McCracken	(Scotland) Auchinleck Talbot	Loan
(Scotland) Gordon Pope	(Scotland) Auchinleck Talbot	Free
(Scotland) Anthony Marenghi	(Scotland) Stranraer	Free
(Northern Ireland) Michael McGowan	Unattached	Free
(Scotland) Kevin Kyle	Unattached	Retired
(Scotland) Craig Malcolm	(Scotland) Stranraer	Free
(Scotland) Michael Moffat	(Scotland) Dunfermline Athletic	Free
(Scotland) Ryan Nisbet	(Scotland) Cumnock Juniors	Loan
(Scotland) Mark Roberts	(Scotland) Clyde	Free
(Scotland) Paul Slane	(Scotland) Clyde	Free
