= 2014–15 Motherwell F.C. season =

Motherwell
2014–15 season
- Chairman: Vacant
- Manager: Stuart McCall (until 2 November 2014); Kenny Black(caretaker) (2 November – 13 December); Ian Baraclough (from 13 December 2014)
- Stadium: Fir Park
- Scottish Premiership: 11th
- Scottish Premiership play-offs: Winners
- Scottish Cup: Fourth round v Dundee United
- League Cup: Third round v Hamilton Academical
- Europa League: Second qualifying round vs Stjarnan
- Top goalscorer: League: John Sutton (13); All: John Sutton (13)
- Highest home attendance: 7,740 vs Celtic; 6 December 2014
- Lowest home attendance: 3,732 vs Inverness Caledonian Thistle; 16 August 2014
- Average home league attendance: 4,176
Home colours	Away colours

The 2014–15 season is Motherwell's thirtieth consecutive season in the top flight of Scottish football and the second in the newly established Scottish Premiership, having been promoted from the Scottish First Division at the end of the 1984–85 season. Motherwell will also compete in the Europa League, League Cup and the Scottish Cup.

== Season events ==
On 2 June, Motherwell announced that they had extended their contract with Craig Moore until June 2016. The following day, 3 June, Motherwell extended their contract with Keith Lasley until the summer of 2016.

On 5 June, Motherwell announced that they had extended their contracts with Morgyn Neill, Dom Thomas and Steven Higgins, whilst also confirming the that Dale Shirkie, Frazer Johnstone, Paul McCafferty and Ross Kellock had all left the club after not being offered contract extensions.

On 2 November Stuart McCall resigned as manager, with Kenny Black taking over as caretaker manager until Ian Baraclough was appointed as manager on 13 December. Black returned to his role as assistant manager following the appointment of Baraclough, but was sacked by the club on 6 February 2015.

== Squad ==
As of match played 31 May 2015

No.	Name	Nationality	Position	Date of birth (age)	Signed from	Signed in	Contract ends	Apps.	Goals
Goalkeepers
1	George Long	(England)	GK	5 November 1993 (aged 21)	on loan from Sheffield United	2015	2015	15	0
12	Dan Twardzik	(Germany)	GK	13 April 1991 (aged 24)	Dundee	2014	2016	30	0
Defenders
2	Craig Reid	(Scotland)	DF	26 February 1986 (aged 29)	Unattached	2014	2016	38	1
3	Steven Hammell	(Scotland)	DF	18 February 1982 (aged 33)	Southend United	2008	2016	518	5
4	Simon Ramsden	(England)	DF	17 December 1981 (aged 33)	Unattached	2012	2015	81	1
6	Stephen McManus	(Scotland)	DF	2 September 1982 (aged 32)	Unattached	2013	2016	84	5
15	Mark O'Brien	(Republic of Ireland)	DF	20 November 1992 (aged 22)	on loan from Derby County	2014	2015	23	0
17	Zaine Francis-Angol	(Antigua and Barbuda)	DF	30 June 1993 (aged 21)	Tottenham Hotspur	2011	2015	76	3
20	Fraser Kerr	(Scotland)	DF	17 January 1993 (aged 22)	Unattached	2013	2015	67	1
30	David Ferguson	(Scotland)	DF	24 March 1996 (aged 19)	Academy	2013		5	0
38	Luke Watt	(Scotland)	DF	20 June 1997 (aged 17)	Academy	2014		5	0
45	Louis Laing	(England)	DF	6 March 1993 (aged 22)	on loan from Nottingham Forest	2015	2015	13	1
	Ben Hall	(Northern Ireland)	DF	16 January 1997 (aged 18)	Dungannon Swifts	2013		0	0
Midfielders
4	Stuart Carswell	(Scotland)	MF	9 September 1993 (aged 21)	Academy	2011	2015	99	0
7	Lionel Ainsworth	(England)	MF	1 October 1987 (aged 27)	Rotherham United	2014	2015	70	20
8	Paul Lawson	(Scotland)	MF	15 May 1984 (aged 31)	Ross County	2013	2015	26	0
11	Iain Vigurs	(Scotland)	MF	7 May 1988 (aged 27)	Ross County	2013	2015	53	6
14	Keith Lasley	(Scotland)	MF	21 September 1979 (aged 35)	Unattached	2006	2016	421	22
18	Josh Law	(England)	MF	19 August 1989 (aged 25)	Alfreton Town	2014	2015	40	2
26	Jack Leitch	(Scotland)	MF	17 July 1995 (aged 19)	Academy	2013		19	0
24	Marvin Johnson	(England)	MF	1 December 1990 (aged 24)	Kidderminster Harriers	2015		13	1
26	Dom Thomas	(Scotland)	MF	14 February 1996 (aged 19)	Academy	2013		15	0
29	Chris Cadden	(Scotland)	MF	19 September 1996 (aged 18)	Academy	2013		6	0
39	Ross MacLean	(Scotland)	MF	13 March 1997 (aged 18)	Academy	2014		1	0
44	Anthony Straker	(Grenada)	MF	23 September 1988 (aged 26)	on loan from York City	2015	2015	13	0
46	Nathan Thomas	(England)	MF	27 September 1994 (aged 20)	Plymouth Argyle	2015	2015 (+1)	2	0
47	Conor Grant	(England)	MF	18 April 1995 (aged 20)	on loan from Everton	2015	2015	12	1
48	Stephen Pearson	(Scotland)	MF	2 October 1982 (aged 32)	Kerala Blasters	2015	2015	103	14
Forwards
9	John Sutton	(England)	FW	26 December 1983 (aged 31)	Unattached	2013	2015	209	78
19	Lee Erwin	(Scotland)	FW	19 March 1994 (aged 21)	Academy	2013		38	6
22	Craig Moore	(Scotland)	FW	16 August 1994 (aged 20)	Academy	2011	2016	29	1
77	Scott McDonald	(Australia)	FW	21 August 1983 (aged 31)	Millwall	2015	2015	138	50
Away on loan
16	Bob McHugh	(Scotland)	FW	16 July 1991 (aged 23)	Academy	2007	2015	92	8
32	Morgyn Neill	(Scotland)	DF	10 March 1996 (aged 19)	Academy	2013		0	0
	Adam Cummins	(England)	DF	3 March 1993 (aged 22)	Everton	2011	2015	34	1
Left during the season
24	Henrik Ojamaa	(Estonia)	FW	20 May 1991 (aged 24)	on loan from Legia Warsaw	2014	2015	86	17

== Transfers ==
=== In ===
Date	Position	Nationality	Name	From	Fee	Ref
21 May 2014	MF	(England)	Josh Law	Alfreton Town	Free	
23 May 2014	GK	(Germany)	Dan Twardzik	Dundee	Free	
16 June 2014	MF	(England)	Lionel Ainsworth	Rotherham United	Free	
19 January 2015	MF	(Scotland)	Stephen Pearson	Kerala Blasters	Free	
3 February 2015	MF	(England)	Nathan Thomas	Plymouth Argyle	Free	
26 February 2015	FW	(Australia)	Scott McDonald	Millwall	Free	

=== Loans in ===
Date from	Position	Nationality	Name	From	Date to	Ref.
14 August 2014	FW	(Estonia)	Henrik Ojamaa	Legia Warsaw	29 January 2015	
15 August 2014	DF	(Republic of Ireland)	Mark O'Brien	Derby County	31 May 2015	
29 January 2015	MF	(Grenada)	Anthony Straker	York City	31 May 2015	
30 January 2015	DF	(England)	Louis Laing	Nottingham Forest	31 May 2015	
2 February 2015	MF	(England)	Conor Grant	Everton	31 May 2015	
2 February 2015	GK	(England)	George Long	Sheffield United	31 May 2015	

=== Out ===
Date	Position	Nationality	Name	To	Fee	Ref.
19 June 2014	FW	(Estonia)	Henri Anier	Erzgebirge Aue	Undisclosed	

=== Loans out ===
Date from	Position	Nationality	Name	To	Date to	Ref.
27 February 2015	DF	(England)	Adam Cummins	Stirling Albion	End of Season	

=== Released ===
Date	Position	Nationality	Name	Joined	Date	Ref.
4 March 2015	GK	(Faroe Islands)	Gunnar Nielsen	Stjarnan		
2 June 2015	GK	(Scotland)	Ross M. Stewart	Albion Rovers	June 2015	
2 June 2015	DF	(England)	Adam Cummins	Bangor City	18 August 2015	
2 June 2015	DF	(Antigua and Barbuda)	Zaine Francis-Angol	Kidderminster Harriers	2 October 2015	
2 June 2015	DF	(England)	Simon Ramsden	Gateshead	10 July 2015	
2 June 2015	MF	(Scotland)	Stuart Carswell	St Mirren	29 June 2015	
2 June 2015	MF	(Scotland)	Fraser Kerr	Cowdenbeath	November 2015	
2 June 2015	MF	(Scotland)	Paul Lawson	Formartine United	6 July 2015	
2 June 2015	MF	(England)	Nathan Thomas	Mansfield Town	3 June 2015	
2 June 2015	MF	(Scotland)	Iain Vigurs	Inverness Caledonian Thistle	12 August 2015	
2 June 2015	FW	(Scotland)	Robert McHugh	Falkirk	14 July 2015	
10 June 2015	FW	(Scotland)	Lee Erwin	Leeds United	1 July 2015	
15 June 2015	FW	(England)	John Sutton	St Johnstone	17 June 2015	

== Friendlies ==
12 July 2014	Motherwell	0–2	Fulham	Motherwell
14:00 BST UTC+1		Motherwell; Fulham	C.Burgess; Stafylidis	Stadium: Fir Park

== Competitions ==
=== Overview ===
Competition	First match	Last match	Starting round	Final position	Record							
Competition	First match	Last match	Starting round	Final position	Pld	W	D	L	GF	GA	GD	Win %
Premiership	9 August 2014	23 May 2015	Matchday 1	11th	38	10	6	22	38	63	−25	26.32
Relegation play-off	28 May 2015	31 May 2015	1st leg	Winners	2	2	0	0	6	1	+5	100.00
Scottish Cup	29 November 2014	13 March 2022	Fourth round	Fourth round	1	0	0	1	1	2	−1	0.00
League Cup	24 September 2014	14 August 2021	Third round	Third round	1	0	1	0	0	0	+0	0.00
Europa League	17 July 2014	24 July 2014	Second qualifying round	Second qualifying round	2	0	1	1	4	5	−1	0.00
Total					44	12	8	24	49	71	−22	27.27

Last updated: 31 May 2015
Source: Soccerway

=== Premiership ===
==== League table ====
Pos	Team	Pld	W	D	L	GF	GA	GD	Pts	Qualification or relegation
8	Partick Thistle	38	12	10	16	48	44	+4	46	
9	Ross County	38	12	8	18	46	63	−17	44	
10	Kilmarnock	38	11	8	19	44	59	−15	41	
11	Motherwell (O)	38	10	6	22	38	63	−25	36	Qualification for the Premiership play-off final
12	St Mirren (R)	38	9	3	26	30	66	−36	30	Relegation to the Championship

Source: SPFL
Rules for classification: 1) points; 2) goal difference; 3) number of goals scored
(O) Play-off winners; (R) Relegated

==== Results by round ====
Round	1	2	3	4	5	6	7	8	9	10	11	12	13	14	15	16	17	18	19	20	21	22	23	24	25	26	27	28	29	30	31	32	33	34	35	36	37	38
Ground	H	A	H	A	H	A	A	H	A	H	A	A	H	A	H	H	A	H	A	H	A	A	A	H	A	H	H	H	A	H	A	H	A	A	H	H	A	H
Result	W	L	L	L	L	W	D	L	L	L	L	L	W	L	L	D	W	W	L	L	L	L	L	D	L	L	W	D	L	W	W	W	L	L	D	W	L	D
Position	2	6	9	10	10	10	10	10	11	11	11	11	10	10	10	10	10	10	10	10	10	10	10	11	11	12	12	11	11	11	11	11	11	11	11	11	11	11

Source: BBC Sport
A = Away; H = Home; W = Win; D = Draw; L = Loss

==== Results summary ====
Overall								Home						Away					
Pld	W	D	L	GF	GA	GD	Pts	W	D	L	GF	GA	GD	W	D	L	GF	GA	GD
38	10	6	22	38	63	−25	36	7	5	7	23	21	+2	3	1	15	15	42	−27

Source: BBC Sport

==== Results ====
9 August 2014 1	Motherwell	1–0	St Mirren	Motherwell
15:00 BST UTC+1	Erwin 64'	Motherwell; BBC		Stadium: Fir Park; Attendance: 4,620; Referee: Calum Murray

13 August 2014 2	Dundee United	1–0	Motherwell	Dundee
19:45 BST UTC+1	Bilate 83'	Motherwell; BBC		Stadium: Tannadice Stadium; Attendance: 8,367; Referee: Kevin Clancy

16 August 2014 3	Motherwell	0–2	Inverness Caledonian Thistle	Motherwell
15:00 BST UTC+1		Motherwell; BBC	Tansey 42'; Doran 89'	Stadium: Fir Park; Attendance: 3,732; Referee: Steven McLean

23 August 2014 4	Kilmarnock	2–0	Motherwell	Kilmarnock
15:00 BST UTC+1	Muirhead 9'; Clingan 78'	Motherwell; BBC	Kerr (red card) 76'	Stadium: Rugby Park; Attendance: 4,146

30 August 2014 5	Motherwell	0–1	St Johnstone	Motherwell
15:00 BST UTC+1		Motherwell; BBC	Graham 86'	Stadium: Fir Park; Attendance: 3,700; Referee: Alan Muir

13 September 2014 6	Ross County	1–2	Motherwell	Dingwall
15:00 BST UTC+1	Boyce 78'	Motherwell; BBC	Vigurs 49'; Sutton 54'	Stadium: Global Energy Stadium; Attendance: 3,012; Referee: Steven McLean

21 September 2014 7	Celtic	1–1	Motherwell	Glasgow
15:00 BST UTC+1	Commons 68' (pen.)	Motherwell; BBC	Sutton 19'	Stadium: Celtic Park; Attendance: 41,719; Referee: Brian Colvin

27 September 2014 8	Motherwell	0–4	Hamilton Academical	Motherwell
15:00 BST UTC+1		Motherwell; BBC	Andreu 34'; Crawford 45', 90'; Antoine-Curier 63' (pen.)	Stadium: Fir Park; Attendance: 4,125; Referee: Willie Collum

4 October 2014 9	Partick Thistle	3–1	Motherwell	Glasgow
15:00 BST UTC+1	Bannigan 16'; Doolan 63'; O'Donnell 82'	Motherwell; BBC	Ainsworth 72'	Stadium: Firhill Stadium; Attendance: 3,405; Referee: Bobby Madden

18 October 2014 10	Motherwell	1–3	Dundee	Motherwell
15:00 BST UTC+1	Ojamaa 62'	Motherwell; BBC	Clarkson 3'; Harkins 30'; Stewart 59'	Stadium: Fir Park; Attendance: 4,061; Referee: Brian Colvin

24 October 2014 11	Aberdeen	1–0	Motherwell	Aberdeen
19:45 BST UTC+1	Hayes 2'	Motherwell; BBC		Stadium: Pittodrie Stadium; Attendance: 11,149; Referee: Crawford Allan

31 October 2014 12	St Johnstone	2–1	Motherwell	Perth
19:45 GMT UTC	O'Halloran 40', 80'	Motherwell; BBC	Ainsworth 13'	Stadium: McDiarmid Park; Attendance: 2,531; Referee: Kevin Clancy

7 November 2014 13	Motherwell	1–0	Dundee United	Motherwell
19:45 GMT UTC	Vigurs 52'	Motherwell; BBC		Stadium: Fir Park; Attendance: 3,961; Referee: Steven McLean

22 November 2014 14	Inverness Caledonian Thistle	3–1	Motherwell	Inverness
15:00 GMT UTC	McKay 29'; Watkins 71'; Meekings 78'	Motherwell; BBC	Ojamaa 31'	Stadium: Caledonian Stadium; Attendance: 3,037; Referee: Bobby Madden

6 December 2014 15	Motherwell	0–1	Celtic	Motherwell
12:45 GMT UTC	Ramsden (red card) 66'	Motherwell; BBC	Stokes 5'	Stadium: Fir Park; Attendance: 7,740; Referee: Calum Murray

13 December 2014 16	Motherwell	2–2	Ross County	Motherwell
15:00 GMT UTC	Sutton 53'; Ojamaa 59'	Motherwell; BBC	Dingwall 45', 90'	Stadium: Fir Park; Attendance: 3,193; Referee: Willie Collum

20 December 2014 17	St Mirren	0–1	Motherwell	Paisley
15:00 GMT UTC	Thompson (red card) 18'	Motherwell; BBC	Sutton 72'	Stadium: St Mirren Park; Attendance: 3,909; Referee: Alan Muir

27 December 2014 18	Motherwell	1–0	Partick Thistle	Motherwell
15:00 GMT UTC	Sutton 14' (pen.)	Motherwell; BBC		Stadium: Fir Park; Attendance: 5,236; Referee: Brian Colvin

1 January 2015 19	Hamilton Academical	5–0	Motherwell	Hamilton
15:00 GMT UTC	Imrie 8'; Crawford 29'; Antoine-Curier 64'; Andreu 69'; Redmond 87'	Motherwell; BBC		Stadium: New Douglas Park; Attendance: 3,926; Referee: Crawford Allan

4 January 2015 20	Motherwell	0–2	Aberdeen	Motherwell
15:30 GMT UTC	McManus (red card) 88'	Motherwell; BBC	Rooney 36', 89' (pen.)	Stadium: Fir Park; Attendance: 4,805; Referee: Willie Collum

10 January 2015 21	Dundee	4–1	Motherwell	Dundee
15:00 GMT UTC	Harris 3'; Stewart 8'; Irvine 34'; O'Brien 70' (o.g.)	Motherwell; BBC	Sutton 19'; Ojamaa (red card) 45'	Stadium: Dens Park; Attendance: 5,105; Referee: Stephen Finnie

17 January 2015 22	Motherwell	Postponed	Kilmarnock	Motherwell
15:00 GMT UTC		[ Motherwell] BBC		Stadium: Fir Park

21 January 2015 23	Celtic	4–0	Motherwell	Glasgow
19:45 GMT UTC	van Dijk 26'; Griffiths 42'; Lustig 76', 81'	[ Motherwell] BBC		Stadium: Celtic Park; Attendance: 42,296; Referee: Bobby Madden

24 January 2015 24	Dundee United	3–1	Motherwell	Dundee
15:00 GMT UTC	Telfer 61', 90'; Fojut 69'	[ Motherwell] BBC	Ramsden 78'	Stadium: Tannadice Park; Attendance: 7,176; Referee: Craig Thomson

31 January 2015 25	Motherwell	1–1	St Johnstone	Motherwell
15:00 GMT UTC	Laing (red card) 25'; Sutton 75'	[ Motherwell] BBC	Davidson 8'	Stadium: Fir Park; Attendance: 3,449; Referee: Willie Collum

14 February 2015 26	Ross County	3–2	Motherwell	Dingwall
15:00 GMT UTC	Woods 34'; P.Quinn 58'; De Vita 62'	[ Motherwell] BBC	Grant 53'; Kerr 78'	Stadium: Victoria Park; Attendance: 2,982; Referee: Calum Murray

21 February 2015 27	Motherwell	0–1	Dundee	Motherwell
15:00 GMT UTC		[ Motherwell] BBC	McGinn 12'	Stadium: Fir Park; Attendance: 4,282; Referee: Don Robertson

28 February 2015 28	Motherwell	2–1	Inverness Caledonian Thistle	Motherwell
15:00 GMT UTC	Pearson (yellow card) 27'; Ramsden (yellow card) 34' (yellow-red card) 88'; Laing 48'; Ainsworth 84'	[ Motherwell] BBC	Draper (yellow card) 55'; Tansey (yellow card) 60'; Devine (yellow card) 74'; Ofere 76'	Stadium: Fir Park; Attendance: 3,508; Referee: Alan Muir

7 March 2015 22	Motherwell	1–1	Kilmarnock	Motherwell
15:00 GMT UTC	Johnson (yellow card) 7'; McDonald 45+1'	[ Motherwell] BBC	Obadeyi 20'; Westlake (yellow card) 42' (yellow-red card) 45'; O'Hara (yellow card) 67'	Stadium: Fir Park; Attendance: 4,192; Referee: John Beaton

13 March 2015 29	Aberdeen	2–1	Motherwell	Aberdeen
19:45 GMT UTC	Taylor 50'; Rooney 52'	[ Motherwell] BBC	McDonald 37' (yellow card) 84'; Lasley (yellow card) 62'; Erwin (yellow card) 79'	Stadium: Pittodrie Stadium; Attendance: 13,267; Referee: Crawford Allan

20 March 2015 30	Motherwell	4–0	Hamilton Academical	Motherwell
19:45 GMT UTC	Ainsworth 49', 50'; Sutton 80', 83' (pen.)	[ Motherwell] BBC	Imrie (yellow card) 29'; García (yellow card) 64'; Lyon (red card) 65'; Gordon (yellow card) 83'	Stadium: Fir Park; Attendance: 4,250; Referee: Calum Murray

4 April 2015 31	Kilmarnock	1–2	Motherwell	Kilmarnock
15:00 BST UTC+1	D.Syme 17' (yellow card) 79'; Cairney (yellow card) 66'; Obadeyi (yellow card) 72'	[ Motherwell] BBC	Pearson (yellow card) 29' (goal) 38'; Law (yellow card) 31'; Laing (yellow card) 62'; Erwin 77'	Stadium: Rugby Park; Attendance: 4,532; Referee: Euan Anderson

7 April 2015 32	Motherwell	5–0	St Mirren	Motherwell
20:45 BST UTC+1	Erwin 7', 25'; McDonald 45'; Sutton 74', 79'	Motherwell [ BBC]	McAusland (yellow card) 51'; McGinn (yellow card) 82'	Stadium: Fir Park; Attendance: 4,596; Referee: Craig Thomson

11 April 2015 33	Partick Thistle	2–0	Motherwell	Glasgow
15:00 BST UTC+1	Taylor 54', 61' (yellow card) 71'; Balatoni (yellow card) 72'	Motherwell [ BBC]	Lasley (yellow card) 71'; Carswell (yellow card) 84' (yellow-red card) 89'	Stadium: Firhill Stadium; Attendance: 5,003; Referee: Bobby Madden

24 April 2015 34	Hamilton Academical	2–0	Motherwell	Hamilton
19:45 BST UTC+1	Scotland 21'; Crawford 52'; Devlin (yellow card) 72'; Lyon (yellow card) 83'; Hasselbaink (yellow card) 85'	[ Motherwell] BBC		Stadium: New Douglas Park; Attendance: 3,301; Referee: John Beaton

2 May 2015 35	Motherwell	1–1	Ross County	Motherwell
15:00 BST UTC+1	McDonald (yellow card) 5' (goal) 19'; Erwin (yellow card) 37'; Pearson (yellow card) 52'; O'Brien (yellow card) 63'	[ Motherwell] BBC	Boyce 41'; Quinn (yellow card) 44'; Boyd (yellow card) 49'	Stadium: Fir Park; Attendance: 4,281; Referee: Crawford Allan

8 May 2015 36	Motherwell	3–1	Kilmarnock	Motherwell
19:45 BST UTC+1	McDonald 28'; Erwin 39'; Pearson (yellow card) 69'; Ainsworth 90'	[ Motherwell] BBC	Ashcroft (yellow card) 29'; Magennis 53'; Pascali (yellow card) 65'; Hamill (yellow card) 69'; Westlake (yellow card) 86'	Stadium: Fir Park; Attendance: 3,986; Referee: William Collum

16 May 2015 37	St Mirren	2–1	Motherwell	Paisley
15:00 BST UTC+1	Naismith 84'; Mallan 90+7'	[ Motherwell] BBC	O'Brien (yellow card) 41'; Lasley (yellow card) 56'; McManus (yellow card) 67'; Sutton 75' (pen.); McDonald (red card) 90'; Pearson (yellow card) 90+8'	Stadium: St Mirren Park; Attendance: 3,912; Referee: Brian Colvin

23 May 2015 38	Motherwell	0–0	Partick Thistle	Motherwell
15:00 BST UTC+1		[ Motherwell] BBC		Stadium: Fir Park; Attendance: 3,711; Referee: Steven McLean

==== Premiership play-offs ====
28 May 2015 1st leg	Rangers	1–3	Motherwell	Glasgow
19:45 BST UTC+1	McGregor (yellow card) 37' (goal) 82'	BBC	Erwin 27'; McManus 40'; Ainsworth 47'; Laing (yellow card) 66'	Stadium: Ibrox Stadium; Attendance: 49,200; Referee: Bobby Madden

31 May 2015 2nd leg	Motherwell	3–0 (6–1 agg.)	Rangers	Motherwell
15:00 BST UTC+1	McDonald (yellow card) 51'; Johnson 52'; Ainsworth 70'; Sutton 90+3' (pen.); Erwin (yellow card) FT; Kerr (red card) FT	BBC	Murdoch (yellow card) 27'; Vučkić (yellow card) 38'; McCulloch (yellow card) 41'; Foster (yellow card) 81'; Mohsni (red card) FT	Stadium: Fir Park; Attendance: 9,220; Referee: Craig Thomson
Note: Bilel Mohsni and Fraser Kerr where show Red Cards following the full-time whistle, whilst Lee Erwin was shown a yellow card.

=== Scottish Cup ===
29 November 2014 Fourth Round	Motherwell	1–2	Dundee United	Motherwell
15:00 GMT UTC	Ojamaa 7'	Motherwell; BBC	Souttar 66'; Watson 82'	Stadium: Fir Park; Attendance: 4,827; Referee: Craig Thomson

=== Scottish League Cup ===
24 September 2014 Third round	Hamilton Academical	0–0 (a.e.t.) (6–5 p)	Motherwell	Hamilton
19:45 BST UTC+1	Hendrie (yellow card) 45' (yellow-red card) 65'	Motherwell; BBC	O'Brien (yellow card) 46' (yellow-red card) 101'	Stadium: New Douglas Park; Attendance: 3,631; Referee: Craig Charleston
	Penalties
	Gillespie (penalty scored); Crawford (penalty scored); Devlin (penalty scored); Longridge (penalty scored); Imrie (penalty scored); Watson (penalty scored)		(penalty scored) Sutton; (penalty scored) McManus; (penalty scored) Ojamaa; (penalty scored) Leitch; (penalty scored) Law; (penalty missed) Ramsden

=== UEFA Europa League ===
==== Qualifying phase ====
17 July 2014 Second qualifying round 1st leg	Motherwell (Scotland)	2–2	(Iceland) Stjarnan	Motherwell, Scotland
19:45 BST UTC+1	Law 9', 19'	Motherwell; BBC; UEFA	Finsen 35' (pen.), 90+2' (pen.)	Stadium: Fir Park; Referee: Michael Johansen (Denmark)

24 July 2014 Second qualifying round 2nd leg	Stjarnan (Iceland)	3–2 (a.e.t.) (5–4 agg.)	(Scotland) Motherwell	Garðabær, Iceland
20:15 BST UTC+1	Finsen 37' (pen.); Toft 85'; A. Jóhannsson 114'	Motherwell; BBC; UEFA	Hammell 11'; Ainsworth 66'	Stadium: Stjörnuvöllur; Referee: Athanasios Giachos (Greece)

== Squad statistics ==
=== Appearances ===
As of match played 31 May 2015

No.	Pos	Nat	Player	Total		Premiership		Premiership Play-offs		Scottish Cup		League Cup		Europa League	
No.	Pos	Nat	Player	Apps	Goals	Apps	Goals	Apps	Goals	Apps	Goals	Apps	Goals	Apps	Goals
1	GK	(England) ENG	George Long	15	0	13	0	2	0	0	0	0	0	0	0
2	DF	(Scotland) SCO	Craig Reid	24	0	19+1	0	0	0	0+1	0	1	0	2	0
3	DF	(Scotland) SCO	Steven Hammell	14	1	10	0	2	0	0	0	0	0	2	1
4	MF	(Scotland) SCO	Stuart Carswell	21	0	14+5	0	0	0	0	0	0	0	2	0
5	DF	(England) ENG	Simon Ramsden	28	1	20+2	1	0+2	0	1	0	0+1	0	2	0
6	DF	(Scotland) SCO	Stephen McManus	42	1	36	1	2	0	1	0	1	0	2	0
7	MF	(England) ENG	Lionel Ainsworth	39	9	19+15	6	2	2	0	0	1	0	2	1
8	MF	(Scotland) SCO	Paul Lawson	4	0	3	0	0	0	1	0	0	0	0	0
9	FW	(England) ENG	John Sutton	43	13	27+11	12	0+1	1	1	0	1	0	2	0
11	MF	(Scotland) SCO	Iain Vigurs	15	2	10+1	2	0	0	1	0	1	0	2	0
12	GK	(Germany) GER	Dan Twardzik	30	0	26	0	0	0	1	0	1	0	2	0
14	MF	(Scotland) SCO	Keith Lasley	39	0	33	0	2	0	1	0	1	0	2	0
15	DF	(Republic of Ireland) IRL	Mark O'Brien	23	0	17+2	0	0	0	1	0	1	0	2	0
17	DF	(Antigua and Barbuda) ANT	Zaine Francis-Angol	13	0	10+1	0	0	0	1	0	0	0	0+1	0
18	MF	(England) ENG	Josh Law	40	2	28+6	0	2	0	1	0	1	0	2	2
19	FW	(Scotland) SCO	Lee Erwin	38	6	20+14	5	2	1	0+1	0	0	0	0+1	0
20	DF	(Scotland) SCO	Fraser Kerr	25	1	16+5	1	0	0	0+1	0	1	0	0+2	0
21	MF	(Scotland) SCO	Jack Leitch	9	0	4+3	0	0	0	0	0	1	0	0+1	0
22	FW	(Scotland) SCO	Craig Moore	10	0	2+7	0	0+1	0	0	0	0	0	0	0
24	MF	(England) ENG	Marvin Johnson	13	1	10+1	0	2	1	0	0	0	0	0	0
26	MF	(Scotland) SCO	Dom Thomas	15	0	2+13	0	0	0	0	0	0	0	0	0
29	MF	(Scotland) SCO	Chris Cadden	3	0	0+3	0	0	0	0	0	0	0	0	0
30	DF	(Scotland) SCO	David Ferguson	5	0	2+3	0	0	0	0	0	0	0	0	0
38	DF	(Scotland) SCO	Luke Watt	5	0	5	0	0	0	0	0	0	0	0	0
39	MF	(Scotland) SCO	Ross MacLean	1	0	0+1	0	0	0	0	0	0	0	0	0
44	MF	(Grenada) GRN	Anthony Straker	13	0	11+1	0	0+1	0	0	0	0	0	0	0
45	DF	(England) ENG	Louis Laing	13	1	11	1	2	0	0	0	0	0	0	0
46	MF	(England) ENG	Nathan Thomas	2	0	1+1	0	0	0	0	0	0	0	0	0
47	MF	(England) ENG	Conor Grant	12	1	10+1	1	0+1	0	0	0	0	0	0	0
48	MF	(Scotland) SCO	Stephen Pearson	15	1	13	1	2	0	0	0	0	0	0	0
77	FW	(Australia) AUS	Scott McDonald	13	5	11	5	2	0	0	0	0	0	0	0
Players away from the club on loan:
16	FW	(Scotland) SCO	Bob McHugh	4	0	1+3	0	0	0	0	0	0	0	0	0
Players who appeared for Motherwell no longer at the club:
24	FW	(Estonia) EST	Henrik Ojamaa	21	4	17+2	3	0	0	1	1	0+1	0	0	0

=== Goal scorers ===
As of match played 31 May 2015

Ranking	Nation	Position	Number	Name	Premiership	Premiership Play-offs	Scottish Cup	League Cup	UEFA Europa League	Total
1	(England)	FW	9	John Sutton	12	1	0	0	0	13
2	(England)	MF	7	Lionel Ainsworth	6	2	0	0	1	9
3	(Scotland)	FW	19	Lee Erwin	5	1	0	0	0	6
4	(Australia)	FW	77	Scott McDonald	5	0	0	0	0	5
5	(Estonia)	FW	24	Henrik Ojamaa	3	0	1	0	0	4
6	(Scotland)	MF	11	Iain Vigurs	2	0	0	0	0	2
6	(England)	MF	18	Josh Law	0	0	0	0	2	2
8	(England)	DF	5	Simon Ramsden	1	0	0	0	0	1
8	(Scotland)	DF	20	Fraser Kerr	1	0	0	0	0	1
8	(England)	MF	47	Conor Grant	1	0	0	0	0	1
8	(England)	DF	45	Louis Laing	1	0	0	0	0	1
8	(Scotland)	MF	48	Stephen Pearson	1	0	0	0	0	1
8	(Scotland)	DF	6	Stephen McManus	0	1	0	0	0	1
8	(Scotland)	MF	24	Marvin Johnson	0	1	0	0	0	1
8	(Scotland)	DF	3	Steven Hammell	0	0	0	0	1	1
TOTALS					38	6	1	0	4	49

=== Clean sheets ===
As of match played 31 May 2015

Ranking	Nation	Position	Number	Name	Premiership	Premiership Play-offs	Scottish Cup	League Cup	UEFA Europa League	Total
1	(Germany)	GK	12	Dan Twardzik	5	0	0	1	0	6
2	(England)	GK	1	George Long	2	1	0	0	0	3
TOTALS					7	1	0	1	0	9

=== Disciplinary record ===
As of match played 31 May 2015

Number	Nation	Position	Name	Premiership		Premiership Play-offs		Scottish Cup		League Cup		Europa League		Total	
Number	Nation	Position	Name	Yellow card	Red card	Yellow card	Red card	Yellow card	Red card	Yellow card	Red card	Yellow card	Red card	Yellow card	Red card
2	(Scotland)	DF	Craig Reid	5	0	0	0	0	0	0	0	1	0	6	0
4	(Scotland)	MF	Stuart Carswell	3	1	0	0	0	0	0	0	1	0	4	1
5	(England)	DF	Simon Ramsden	4	2	0	0	0	0	0	0	1	0	5	2
6	(Scotland)	DF	Stephen McManus	5	1	0	0	0	0	1	0	1	0	7	1
8	(Scotland)	MF	Paul Lawson	1	0	0	0	0	0	0	0	0	0	1	0
9	(England)	FW	John Sutton	1	0	0	0	0	0	0	0	0	0	1	0
11	(Scotland)	MF	Iain Vigurs	4	0	0	0	1	0	1	0	0	0	6	0
14	(Scotland)	MF	Keith Lasley	5	0	0	0	1	0	0	0	2	0	8	0
15	(Republic of Ireland)	MF	Mark O'Brien	8	0	0	0	0	0	2	1	0	0	10	1
17	(Antigua and Barbuda)	DF	Zaine Francis-Angol	1	0	0	0	0	0	0	0	0	0	1	0
18	(England)	MF	Josh Law	2	0	0	0	0	0	0	0	0	0	2	0
19	(Scotland)	FW	Lee Erwin	3	0	1	0	0	0	0	0	0	0	4	0
20	(Scotland)	DF	Fraser Kerr	1	1	0	1	0	0	0	0	0	0	1	2
21	(Scotland)	MF	Jack Leitch	4	0	0	0	0	0	0	0	0	0	4	0
24	(England)	MF	Marvin Johnson	1	0	0	0	0	0	0	0	0	0	1	0
30	(Scotland)	DF	David Ferguson	1	0	0	0	0	0	0	0	0	0	1	0
45	(England)	DF	Louis Laing	1	1	1	0	0	0	0	0	0	0	2	1
48	(Scotland)	MF	Stephen Pearson	5	0	0	0	0	0	0	0	0	0	5	0
77	(Australia)	FW	Scott McDonald	2	1	1	0	0	0	0	0	0	0	3	1
Players who left Motherwell during the season:
24	(Estonia)	FW	Henrik Ojamaa	3	1	0	0	1	0	0	0	0	0	4	1
			TOTALS	0	0	3	1	3	0	4	1	6	0	16	2

== See also ==
- List of Motherwell F.C. seasons
