= Adam Cummins =

English footballer (born 1993)

Personal information
- Date of birth: 3 March 1993 (age 33)
- Place of birth: Liverpool, England
- Height: 6 ft 2 in (1.88 m)
- Position: Defender

Youth career
- 1998–2011: Everton

Senior career*
Years	Team	Apps	(Gls)
2011–2015	Motherwell	26	(1)
2014	→ Dundee (loan)	3	(0)
2014	→ Ayr United (loan)	4	(0)
2015	→ Stirling Albion (loan)	10	(0)
2015–2016	Bangor City	29	(1)
2016–2018	Queen's Park	64	(10)
2018–2021	Stranraer	66	(3)
2021–2024	Stirling Albion	65	(4)
2024–2025	Stranraer	16	(0)
- * Club domestic league appearances and goals as of 31 May 2025

Adam Cummins (born 3 March 1993) is an English footballer who plays as a defender. Cummins has previously played for Motherwell, Dundee, Ayr United, Queen's Park, Bangor City, Stranraer (two spells), and Stirling Albion.

== Career ==
=== Motherwell ===
Born in Liverpool and growing up as a Liverpool fan, Cummins joined Motherwell in July 2011 from Everton, and was immediately drafted into the Motherwell under-19 squad. His performances for the Under-19's led to him featuring from the start in friendlies for the Motherwell reserves.

Cummins made his first-team debut in a 1–0 win over Aberdeen on 17 March 2012, playing the full 90 minutes. He later got his first career goal in a 5–1 win away to Inverness Caley Thistle on 18 November 2012. On 4 December 2012, Cummins signed a 2 1/2-year contract extension, keeping him at Motherwell until Summer 2015. Cummins said signing a contract extension was an easy decision.

On 9 January 2014, Cummins joined Dundee on loan until the end of the season. After two months on the bench, on 25 March 2014, Cummins made his debut for the club, in a 1–0 win over Queen of the South, playing the full 90 minutes. On 20 November 2014, Cummins signed for Scottish League One club Ayr United on loan for 30 days.

On 27 February 2015, Cummins went out on loan again, this time to Stirling Albion for the remainder of the 2014–15 season. He made his debut in a 4–1 defeat against Airdrieonians on 28 February 2015. Cummins was released by Motherwell at the end of the 2014–15 season.

=== Bangor City ===
On 18 August 2015, Cummins signed for Welsh Premier League side Bangor City.

Cummins made his first team debut for Bangor City in a 1–1 draw against Rhyl on 21 August 2015, playing the full 90 minutes. He scored his first goal for the citizens in a 3–0 home win against Newtown on 24 August 2015.

=== Queen's Park ===
On 4 July 2016, Cummins signed for Scottish League One club Queen's Park.

=== Stranraer ===
Ahead of the 2018–19 season, Cummins moved to Stranraer.

=== Stirling Albion ===
Cummins signed for Stirling Albion in May 2021.

== Career statistics ==
As of match played 30 October 2021

Appearances and goals by club, season and competition
Club	Season	League			National Cup		League Cup		Europe		Total	
Club	Season	Division	Apps	Goals	Apps	Goals	Apps	Goals	Apps	Goals	Apps	Goals
Motherwell	2011–12	Scottish Premier League	1	0	0	0	0	0	0	0	1	0
Motherwell	2012–13	Scottish Premier League	22	1	2	0	1	0	2 (Note: One appearance in the UEFA Champions League and one appearance in the UEFA Europa League)	0	27	1
Motherwell	2013–14	Scottish Premiership	3	0	0	0	0	0	1 (Note: Appearance in the UEFA Europa League)	0	4	0
Motherwell	2014–15	Scottish Premiership	0	0	0	0	0	0	0	0	0	0
Motherwell	Total		26	1	2	0	1	0	3	0	32	1
Dundee (loan)	2013–14	Scottish Championship	3	0	0	0	0	0	0	0	3	0
Ayr United (loan)	2014–15	Scottish League One	4	0	0	0	0	0	0	0	4	0
Stirling Albion (loan)	2014–15	Scottish League One	10	0	0	0	0	0	0	0	10	0
Bangor City	2015–16	Welsh Premier League	29	1	1	0	1	0	0	0	31	1
Queen's Park	2016–17	Scottish League One	33	2	3	0	3	1	4 (Note: Appearances in the Scottish Challenge Cup)	1	43	4
Queen's Park	2017–18	Scottish League One	31	8	1	0	2	1	2 (Note: One appearance and one goal in the Scottish Challenge Cup and one appearance in the Scottish League One play-offs)	1	36	10
Queen's Park	Total		64	10	4	0	5	2	6	2	79	14
Stranraer	2018–19	Scottish League One	25	1	2	0	3	1	1	0	31	2
Stranraer	2019–20	Scottish League One	25	1	2	0	4	2	1	0	32	3
Stranraer	2020–21	Scottish League Two	16	1	2	0	3	0	0	0	21	1
Stranraer	Total		66	3	6	0	10	3	2	0	84	6
Stirling Albion	2021–22	Scottish League Two	10	1	1	0	4	0	1	0	16	1
Career total			212	16	14	0	20	5	8	2	254	23
