= Dale Shirkie =

Scottish footballer

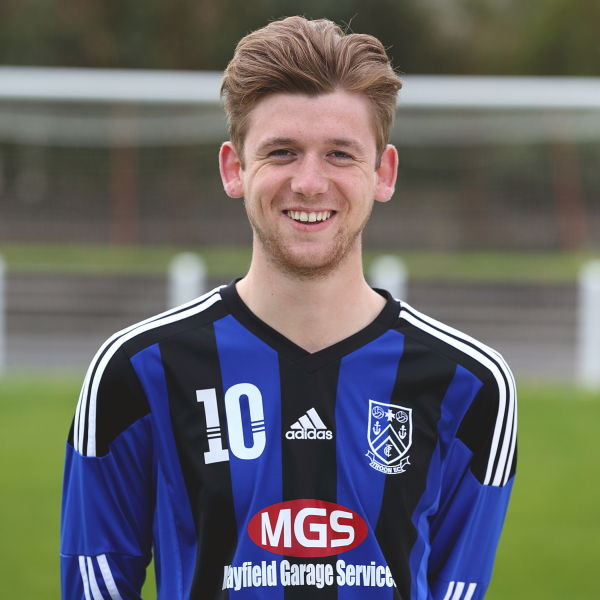
- Dale Shirkie, Troon F.C. (October 2015)

Personal information
- Full name: Dale Shirkie
- Date of birth: 2 May 1995 (age 31)
- Place of birth: Irvine, Scotland
- Height: 1.87 m (6 ft 1 1/2 in)
- Position: Forward

Team information
- Current team: Blacks Bar AFC

Senior career*
| Years | Team | Apps | (Gls) |
| 2012–2014 | Motherwell | 1 | (0) |
| 2014–2015 | Ayr United | 16 | (0) |
| 2015–2018 | Troon | | |
| 2018– | Darvel | | |
- * Club domestic league appearances and goals as of 07:30, 14 December 2020 (UTC)

Dale Shirkie (born 2 May 1995) is a Scottish footballer who plays as a forward for Darvel.

He has previously played for Motherwell, Ayr United and Troon.

== Career ==
Dale began his career as a schoolboy with Dundee United before joining the Motherwell Academy youth set-up and then signing as a professional in 2012.

On 25 February 2014, Shirkie made his debut for Motherwell as a substitute in a 3-0 defeat to St Johnstone.

Shirkie played as a trialist for Ayr United on 9 August 2014, in a 1–0 win against Greenock Morton. Following this appearance, he signed a permanent contract with Ayr on 15 August 2014.

On 28 May 2015, Shirkie signed for Junior club Troon.

Darvel announced the signing of Shirkie on 3 July 2018.

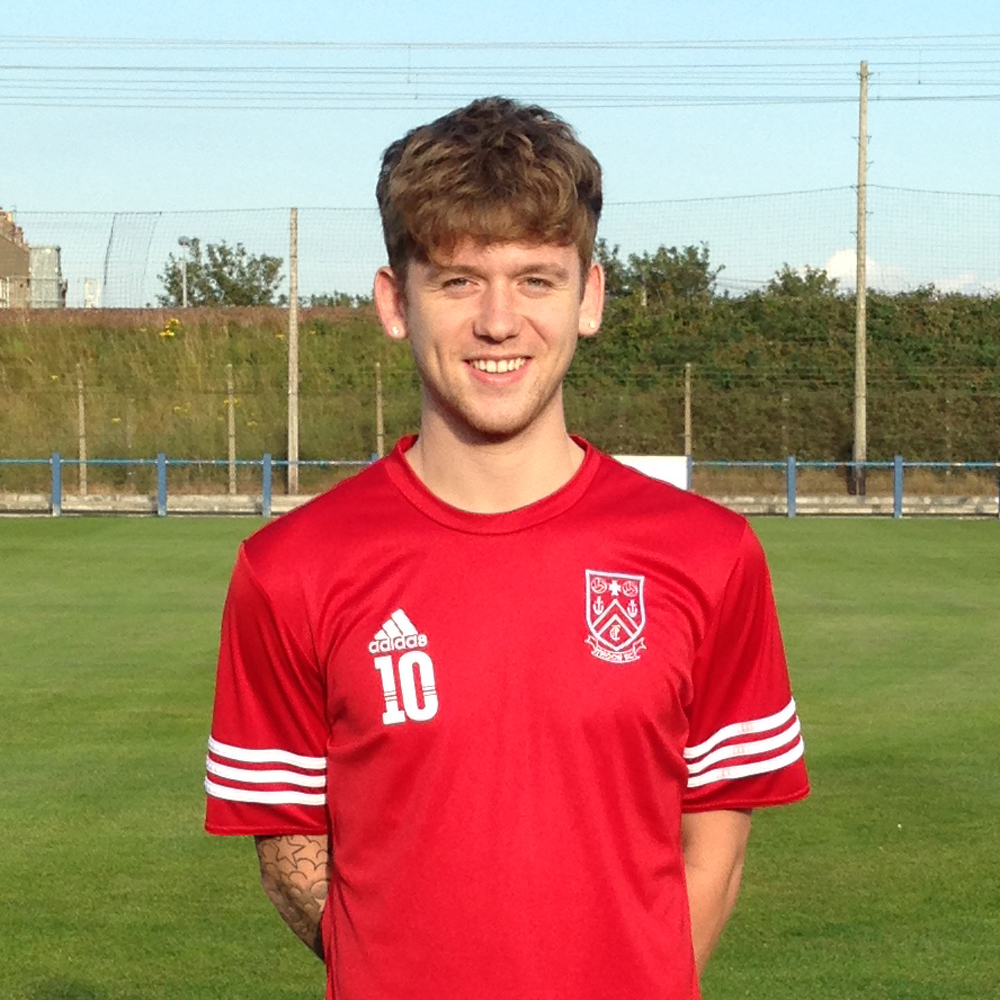
Dale Shirkie, Troon F.C.

== Career statistics ==
As of 9 March 2015

| Club | Season | League | | Cup | | League Cup | | Other | | Total | |
| Club | Season | Apps | Goals | Apps | Goals | Apps | Goals | Apps | Goals | Apps | Goals |
|---|---|---|---|---|---|---|---|---|---|---|---|
| Motherwell | 2013–14 | 1 | 0 | 0 | 0 | 0 | 0 | 0 | 0 | 1 | 0 |
| Ayr United | 2014–15 | 16 | 0 | 2 | 0 | 1 | 0 | 0 | 0 | 19 | 0 |
| Total | | 17 | 0 | 2 | 0 | 1 | 0 | 0 | 0 | 20 | 0 |
