= Morgyn Neill =

Scottish footballer (born 1996)

Personal information
- Date of birth: 10 March 1996 (age 30)
- Place of birth: Glasgow, Scotland
- Position: Defender

Team information
- Current team: Elgin City

Youth career
- 2008–2013: Motherwell

Senior career*
Years	Team	Apps	(Gls)
2013–2015	Motherwell	0	(0)
2015	→ Ayr United (loan)	7	(1)
2015–2017	Livingston	30	(0)
2017	→ Stranraer (loan)	13	(0)
2017–2018	Stranraer	35	(1)
2018–2019	Stenhousemuir	29	(1)
2019–2021	Dumbarton	50	(4)
2021–2023	Cove Rangers	55	(5)
2023–2025	Alloa Athletic	65	(2)
2025–2026	Dumbarton	18	(0)
2026	→ Elgin City (loan)	13	(0)
2026–	Elgin City	2	(0)
- * Club domestic league appearances and goals as of 15 August 2026

Morgyn Neill (born 10 March 1996) is a Scottish professional footballer who plays as a defender for Scottish League Two side Elgin City.

He has previously played for Motherwell, Livingston, Stranraer, Stenhousemuir, Dumbarton, Cove Rangers, Alloa Athletic, and Ayr United.

== Early life ==
Neill was born on 10 March 1996, in Glasgow. He joined the Motherwell youth academy at a young age.

== Career ==
=== Motherwell ===
Neill was at Motherwell for 10 years, but couldn't force his way into the first team. He played with the development squad, and played as a defender.

Having been named on the substitutes bench for Motherwell on a number of occasions during the 2014–15 season, Neill signed for Ayr United on loan on 9 January 2015, with Motherwell manager Ian Baraclough saying he needed to play first-team football. He made his debut for Ayr on 10 January 2015, in a 2–1 defeat away at Brechin City. He scored his first goal for the club one week later in a 1–1 draw with Greenock Morton.

=== Livingston ===
After a successful trial, playing in friendly matches against Dunfermline Athletic and Real Sociedad, Livingston boss Mark Burchill handed Neill a two-year deal. He made his full debut for Livingston against Hibernian in a 1–0 loss.

=== Stranraer ===
In an effort to continue his development, Livingston allowed Neill on to move on loan to fellow Scottish League One side Stranraer for the remainder of the 2016–17 season. After returning from his loan spell Neill was released by Livingston in May 2017, subsequently signing a permanent contract with Stranraer where he went on to be a key player making 59 appearances in a season and a half.

=== Stenhousemuir ===
Neill left Stranraer in the summer of 2018, joining Scottish League One rivals Stenhousemuir in May 2018.

=== Dumbarton ===
Neill joined Dumbarton following Stenhousemuir's relegation in May 2019 playing every minute of the season as the Sons finished sixth in Scottish League One. He extended his deal with the Sons until the summer of 2021 in July 2020. Neill left the Sons in May 2021, turning down a new deal after the departure of manager Jim Duffy.

=== Cove Rangers ===
Neill signed for Cove Rangers on 4 June 2021 after his release from Dumbarton and scored his first goal for the club in a 1-0 win over Airdrieonians. Neill would be later win the title that campaign with Cove Rangers, starting in a 1-0 victory over his former club Dumbarton. The next campaign the success would not continue for Morgyn and Cove, as they finished bottom of the Scottish Championship.

=== Alloa Athletic ===
On 16 June 2023, Neill joined Alloa Athletic. He left the club after two seasons in May 2025.

=== Dumbarton ===
Neill returned for a second spell with Dumbarton in June 2025. Having started just twice for the Sons since new manager Frank McKeown was appointed, Neill joined Scottish League Two rivals Elgin City on loan in February 2026. He was released by the club in May 2026.

=== Elgin City ===
On 27 May 2026, Neill returned to Elgin City on a free transfer following his release from Dumbarton.

== Career statistics ==
As of 19:54, 24 January 2026 (UTC)

Appearances and goals by club, season and competition
Club	Season	League			Cup		League Cup		Other		Total	
Club	Season	Division	Apps	Goals	Apps	Goals	Apps	Goals	Apps	Goals	Apps	Goals
Motherwell	2014–15	Premiership	0	0	0	0	0	0	0	0	0	0
Ayr United (loan)	2014–15	League One	7	1	0	0	0	0	0	0	7	1
Livingston	2015–16	Championship	23	0	2	0	2	0	4 (Note: Two appearances in the Scottish Challenge Cup and two in the Championship play-offs)	0	31	0
Livingston	2016–17	League One	7	0	0	0	0	0	2 (Note: Appearances in the Scottish Challenge Cup)	0	9	0
Livingston	Total		30	0	2	0	2	0	6	0	40	0
Stranraer (loan)	2016–17	League One	13	0	1	0	0	0	0	0	14	0
Stranraer	2017–18	League One	35	1	1	0	3	1	2	0	41	2
Stranraer	Total		50	1	2	0	3	1	2	0	55	2
Stenhousemuir	2018-19	League One	29	1	2	0	4	1	3	0	38	2
Dumbarton	2019–20	League One	28	3	2	0	4	1	1	0	35	4
Dumbarton	2020–21	League One	22	1	2	0	3	0	4	1	31	2
Dumbarton	Total		50	4	4	0	7	1	5	1	66	6
Cove Rangers	2021–22	League One	35	3	3	0	4	0	4	0	46	3
Cove Rangers	2022–23	Championship	20	2	1	0	2	0	1	0	25	2
Cove Rangers	Total		55	5	4	0	6	0	5	0	71	5
Alloa Athletic	2023–24	League One	33	0	2	0	4	1	3	1	42	2
Alloa Athletic	2024–25	League One	32	2	1	0	3	1	2	0	38	3
Alloa Athletic	Total		65	2	3	0	7	2	5	1	80	5
Dumbarton	2025–26	League Two	18	0	2	1	4	0	7	0	30	1
Elgin City (loan)	2025–26	League Two	0	0	0	0	0	0	0	0	0	0
Career total			301	14	19	1	30	5	31	2	388	22
