= Gary Fischer =

Gary Fischer may refer to:

- Gary Fischer, character in British/American TV series Intruders
- Gary Fischer, better known as Henchman 21, character in American TV series The Venture Bros.

== See also ==
- Gary Fisher, cyclist and bicycle maker
- Gary Fisher (footballer), British footballer
