= 2012–13 Airdrie United F.C. season =

Airdrie United
2012–13 season
- Chairman: Jim Ballantyne
- Manager: Jimmy Boyle
- Stadium: Excelsior Stadium
- First Division: Tenth place (Relegated)
- Challenge Cup: Second round, lost to East Stirlingshire
- League Cup: First round, lost to Queens Park
- Scottish Cup: Third round, lost to Raith Rovers
- Top goalscorer: John Boyle (10)
- Highest home attendance: 1,648 v Partick Thistle, 13 April 2013
- Lowest home attendance: 554 v Raith Rovers, 24 March 2013
- Average home league attendance: League: 936
Home colours	Away colours	Third colours

The 2012–13 season was Airdrie United's first season back in the Scottish First Division. Airdrie also competed in the Challenge Cup, League Cup and the Scottish Cup. Airdrie were due to compete in their third consecutive season in the Scottish Second Division, having been relegated from the Scottish First Division at the end of the 2009–10 season. On 16 July 2012, it was confirmed that Airdrie would be promoted to the Scottish First Division to fill the vacancy left by Dundee's promotion to the Scottish Premier League. This was to fill the slot vacated by Rangers, who were voted into the Scottish Third Division following their liquidation.

== Summary ==
=== Season ===
During season 2012–13 Airdrie United finished tenth in the Scottish First Division, and were relegated to the Scottish Second Division. They reached the second round of the Challenge Cup, the first round of the League Cup and the third round of the Scottish Cup.

== League table ==
Pos	Team	Pld	W	D	L	GF	GA	GD	Pts	Promotion or relegation
6	Raith Rovers	36	11	13	12	45	48	−3	46	
7	Dumbarton	36	13	4	19	58	83	−25	43	
8	Cowdenbeath	36	8	12	16	51	65	−14	36	
9	Dunfermline Athletic (R)	36	14	7	15	62	59	+3	34 (Note: Dunfermline Athletic were deducted 15 points for entering administration.)	Qualification for the First Division Play-offs
10	Airdrie United (R)	36	5	7	24	41	89	−48	22	Relegation to League One

Source: SPFL Archive
Rules for classification: 1) points; 2) goal difference; 3) number of goals scored.
(R) Relegated

== Results and fixtures ==
Win Draw Loss Postponed

=== Preseason ===
14 July 2012 Friendly	Whitley Bay	1 – 1	Airdrie United	Hillheads Park
15:00	Walker 81'	Whitley Bay Report	Stallard 45'	Attendance: 377

21 July 2012 ARR Craib Cup	Airdrie United	1 – 2	Everton XI	Firhill Stadium
14:45	Di Giacomo 63'	Report	Barkley 56'; Garbutt 63'	Attendance: 1,467; Referee: Roache

22 July 2012 ARR Craib Cup	Airdrie United	0 – 4	Celtic XI	Firhill Stadium
12:00		Report	Twardzik 7'; McGregor 71'; Eadie 75'; Watt 85'	Referee: Clancy

=== Scottish First Division ===
11 August 2012 Scottish First Division	Airdrie United	4 – 1	Dumbarton	Excelsior Stadium
15:00	Boyle 14', 25', 31'; Di Giacomo 88'	SFL Report	Lister 62'	Attendance: 897; Referee: Beaton

18 August 2012 Scottish First Division	Livingston	0 – 2	Airdrie United	Braidwood Motor Company Stadium
15:00		SFL Report	Boyle 48'; Bain 70'	Attendance: 1,170; Referee: Tumilty

25 August 2012 Scottish First Division	Airdrie United	1 – 2	Dunfermline Athletic	Excelsior Stadium
15:00	Boyle 26'	SFL Report	Dowie 80'; Husband 84'	Attendance: 1,229; Referee: O'Reilly

1 September 2012 Scottish First Division	Airdrie United	0 – 3	Cowdenbeath	Excelsior Stadium
15:00	Warren (red card) 65'	SFL Report	Miller 5'; Coult 76'; McKenzie 85'	Attendance: 816; Referee: Salmond

15 September 2012 Scottish First Division	Raith Rovers	2 – 0	Airdrie United	Stark's Park
15:00	Graham 37'; Spence 83'	SFL Report		Attendance: 1,481; Referee: Allan

22 September 2012 Scottish First Division	Falkirk	1 – 1	Airdrie United	Falkirk Stadium
15:00	Murdoch 35' (Penalty)	SFL Report	Cook 68'	Attendance: 2,951; Referee: McLean

29 September 2012 Scottish First Division	Airdrie United	2 – 3	Greenock Morton	Excelsior Stadium
15:00	Boyle 37', 80'; Lilley (red card) 85'	SFL Report; Airdrie Report	Campbell 49', 79'; O'Brien 68'	Attendance: 1,054; Referee: McKendrick

6 October 2012 Scottish First Division	Airdrie United	0 – 4	Hamilton Academical	Excelsior Stadium
15:00		SFL Report	Crawford 67'; Longridge 72'; May 82', 88' (pen.)	Attendance: 868; Referee: O'Reilly

20 October 2012 Scottish First Division	Partick Thistle	7 – 0	Airdrie United	Firhill Stadium
15:00	Erskine 4', 45'; Muirhead 11' (Penalty); Laawless 30'; Welsh 42'; Doolan 57'; Forbes 80'	SFL Report	Sally (red card) 76'	Attendance: 2,545; Referee: Norris

27 October 2012 Scottish First Division	Dumbarton	3 – 4	Airdrie United	The Bet Butler Stadium
15:00	Prunty 23'; Lister 27'; McDougall 75'	SFL Report	Stallard 65'; Watt 68'; Forsyth 89' (o.g.); Blockley 90+5'	Attendance: 774; Referee: Collum

9 November 2012 Scottish First Division	Airdrie United	1 – 3	Livingston	Excelsior Stadium
19:45	Di Giacomo 20'	SFL Report	McNulty 25'; Fox 63'; Russell 87' (Penalty)	Attendance: 1,003; Referee: McLean

17 November 2012 Scottish First Division	Cowdenbeath	1 – 1	Airdrie United	Central Park
15:00	Stewart 70'	SFL Report	Buchanan 77'	Attendance: 423; Referee: Somers

24 November 2012 Scottish First Division	Airdrie United	0 – 0	Raith Rovers	Excelsior Stadium
15:00	Boyle (yellow card) 63' (red card)	SFL Report		Attendance: 747; Referee: Beaton

8 December 2012 Scottish First Division	Airdrie United	P – P	Falkirk	Excelsior Stadium
15:00		SFL Report

15 December 2012 Scottish First Division	Greenock Morton	2 – 0	Airdrie United	Cappielow Park
15:00	Graham 43'; Hardie 83'	SFL Report		Attendance: 1,302; Referee: Colvin

22 December 2012 Scottish First Division	Airdrie United	1 – 4	Falkirk	Excelsior Stadium
15:00	Donnelly 56'; Blockley (yellow card) 79' (yellow-red card)	SFL Report	Fulton 43'; Taylor 67', 80', 90'	Attendance: 914; Referee: Clancy

26 December 2012 Scottish First Division	Hamilton Academical	3 – 0	Airdrie United	New Douglas Park
15:00	Longridge 15'; Neil 23'; Page 55'	SFL Report		Attendance: 1,179; Referee: Charleston

29 December 2012 Scottish First Division	Airdrie United	1 – 1	Partick Thistle	Excelsior Stadium
15:00	Boyle 41'	SFL Report	Erskine 79'	Attendance: 1,617; Referee: Muir

2 January 2013 Scottish First Division	Airdrie United	1 – 1	Cowdenbeath	Excelsior Stadium
15:00	Donnelly 68'	SFL Report	Brett 3'	Attendance: 776; Referee: Salmond

5 January 2013 Scottish First Division	Raith Rovers	2 – 0	Airdrie United	Stark's Park
15:00	Graham 35'; Clarke 61'	Raith Report		Attendance: 1,270; Referee: Collum

12 January 2013 Scottish First Division	Dunfermline Athletic	1 – 3	Airdrie United	East End Park
15:00	Wallace 13'	BBC Report	Donnelly 4', 59'; Di Giacomo 83' (Penalty)	Attendance: 2,823; Referee: Norris

19 January 2013 Scottish First Division	Airdrie United	1 – 2	Dumbarton	Excelsior Stadium
15:00	Donnelly 11'	SFL Report	McCusker 24'; Lister 33'	Attendance: 844; Referee: Murray

26 January 2013 Scottish First Division	Falkirk	4 – 3	Airdrie United	Falkirk Stadium
15:00	Taylor 9', 35'; Murdoch 24'; Dods 73'	SFL Report	Di Giacomo 57' (Penalty); McLaren 88'; Boyle 90'	Attendance: 2,715; Referee: Roache

9 February 2013 Scottish First Division	Airdrie United	0 – 4	Greenock Morton	Excelsior Stadium
15:00	Warren (yellow card) 83' (yellow-red card); Lamie (red card) 89'	SFL Report	O'Brien 24'; McMenamin 44'; MacDonald 52'; Wilkie 60'	Attendance: 984; Referee: Colvin

16 February 2013 Scottish First Division	Airdrie United	2 – 2	Hamilton Academical	Excelsior Stadium
15:00	Moore 64' (Penalty); Bain 90+5'	SFL Report	May 61', 90+6'	Attendance: 755; Referee: Somers

23 February 2013 Scottish First Division	Partick Thistle	1 – 0	Airdrie United	Firhill Stadium
15:00	Erskine 76'	SFL Report		Attendance: 3,021; Referee: Tumilty

2 March 2013 Scottish First Division	Livingston	4 – 1	Airdrie United	Braidwood Motor Company Stadium
15:00	Andreu 21', 39'; Russell 44'; Scougall 77'	SFL Report	Lynch (yellow card) 75' (yellow-red card); Boyle 90+1'	Attendance: 1,132; Referee: Finnie

9 March 2013 Scottish First Division	Airdrie United	3 – 3	Dunfermline Athletic	Excelsior Stadium
15:00	Blockley 11'; Donnelly 53'; McLaren 85'	SFL Report	Husband 22'; Wallace 86'; Kirk 90+1'	Attendance: 702; Referee: Allan

16 March 2013 Scottish First Division	Cowdenbeath	3 – 2	Airdrie United	Central Park
15:00	McKenzie 13'; Stewart 68'; Moore 88'	SFL Report	Moore 12'; Kirkpatrick 82'	Attendance: 407; Referee: Norris

23 March 2013 Scottish First Division	Airdrie United	1 – 2	Raith Rovers	Excelsior Stadium
15:00	Bain 7'	Raith Report	Spence 44'; G.Anderson 78'	Attendance: 554; Referee: Roache

30 March 2013 Scottish First Division	Airdrie United	0 – 1	Falkirk	Excelsior Stadium
15:00		BBC Report	Taylor 58'; Taylor (yellow card) 67' (yellow-red card)	Attendance: 790; Referee: Northcroft

6 April 2013 Scottish First Division	Greenock Morton	5 – 2	Airdrie United	Cappielow
15:00	MacDonald 5', 22', 60'; McMenamin 69' (Penalty); Warren 85' (Own goal)	SFL Report	Lynch 70'; Cook 73'; Evans (yellow card) 80' (red card)	Attendance: 1,772; Referee: Salmond

9 April 2013 Scottish First Division	Hamilton Academical	5 – 0	Airdrie United	New Douglas Park
19:45	McShane 22'; May 9' (Penalty), 37', 74'; Devlin (yellow card) 86' (yellow-red card); Brophy 87'	SFL Report		Attendance: 850; Referee: Collum

13 April 2013 Scottish First Division	Airdrie United	1 – 2	Partick Thistle	Excelsior Stadium
15:00	Watt 35'	SFL Report	Balatoni 89'; Elliott 90+1'	Attendance: 1,648; Referee: Robertson

20 April 2013 Scottish First Division	Dumbarton	4 – 1	Airdrie United	Dumbarton Football Stadium
15:00	Graham 6'; McGinn 43'; McDougall 48'; Agnew 74'	SFL Report	Buchanan 64'	Attendance: 828; Referee: Salmond

27 April 2013 Scottish First Division	Airdrie United	0 – 2	Livingston	Excelsior Stadium
15:00		SFL Report	Barr 26'; Garcia Tena 80'	Attendance: 650; Referee: Madden

4 May 2013 Scottish First Division	Dunfermline Athletic	1 – 2	Airdrie United	East End Park
15:00	Thomson 58'	SFL Report	Coogans 45'; McLaren 68'	Attendance: 4,624; Referee: Thomson

=== Scottish Challenge Cup ===
28 July 2012 Scottish Challenge Cup round 1	Hamilton Academical	0 – 1	Airdrie United	New Douglas Park
15:00		SFL Report	McLaren 85'	Attendance: 1,005; Referee: Charleston

14 August 2012 Scottish Challenge Cup round 2	East Stirlingshire	3 – 0	Airdrie United	Ochilview Park
19:45	Maxwell 23'; Turner 36'; Herd 89'	SFL Report		Attendance: 383; Referee: Somers

=== Scottish League Cup ===
4 August 2012 Scottish League Cup round 1	Queen's Park	3 – 2 (a.e.t.)	Airdrie United	Firhill Stadium
15:00	Brough 60', 104'; Shankland 88'	SFL Report	Blockley 46'; Cook 66'	Attendance: 622; Referee: Finnie

=== Scottish Cup ===
3 November 2012 Scottish Cup round 3	Airdrie United	2 – 2	Raith Rovers	Excelsior Stadium
15:00	Griffin 28'; Thomson 78' (o.g.)	BBC Report	Mensing 13'; Graham (red card) 47'; Spence 90'	Attendance: 854; Referee: Finnie

13 November 2012 Scottish Cup round 3 replay	Raith Rovers	4 – 3 (a.e.t.)	Airdrie United	Stark's Park
19:45	Spence 5'; Walker 21' (pen.); Anderson 55'; Hill 99'	BBC Report	Watt 3' di Giacomo 45' (pen.); Buchanan 86'	Attendance: 935; Referee: Finnie

== Player statistics ==
=== Squad ===
Last updated 5 May 2013

No.	Pos	Nat	Player	Total		First Division		Challenge Cup		League Cup		Scottish Cup	
No.	Pos	Nat	Player	Apps	Goals	Apps	Goals	Apps	Goals	Apps	Goals	Apps	Goals
	GK	(Scotland) SCO	Grant Adam	8	0	8+0	0	0+0	0	0+0	0	0+0	0
	GK	(Scotland) SCO	Kenny Arthur	22	0	16+1	0	2+0	0	1+0	0	2+0	0
	GK	(Scotland) SCO	Andrew Duncan	2	0	1+0	0	0+0	0	0+0	0	0+1	0
	GK	(Scotland) SCO	Robbie Thomson	11	0	11+0	0	0+0	0	0+0	0	0+0	0
	DF	(Scotland) SCO	Jamie Bain	34	2	25+6	2	1+0	0	0+0	0	2+0	0
	DF	(Scotland) SCO	Gregor Buchanan	31	3	26+2	2	0+1	0	0+0	0	2+0	1
	DF	(Scotland) SCO	Grant Drummond	5	0	4+1	0	0+0	0	0+0	0	0+0	0
	DF	(Scotland) SCO	Grant Evans	21	0	15+3	0	1+0	0	0+0	0	2+0	0
	DF	(Scotland) SCO	Graeme Goodall	0	0	0+0	0	0+0	0	0+0	0	0+0	0
	DF	(Scotland) SCO	Gavin Griffin	12	1	3+5	0	2+0	0	1+0	0	1+0	1
	DF	(Scotland) SCO	Michael Hart	13	0	9+0	0	2+0	0	1+0	0	1+0	0
	DF	(Scotland) SCO	Ricki Lamie	17	0	17+0	0	0+0	0	0+0	0	0+0	0
	DF	(Scotland) SCO	David Lilley	25	0	16+5	0	2+0	0	1+0	0	1+0	0
	DF	(Scotland) SCO	Cameron MacDonald	10	0	7+0	0	2+0	0	1+0	0	0+0	0
	DF	(Scotland) SCO	Chris O'Neil	24	0	23+1	0	0+0	0	0+0	0	0+0	0
	DF	(Scotland) SCO	Kieran Stallard	8	1	5+0	1	0+1	0	0+0	0	2+0	0
	DF	(Australia) AUS	Marc Warren	30	0	24+3	0	1+0	0	1+0	0	1+0	0
	MF	(Scotland) SCO	Jamie Barclay	10	0	6+4	0	0+0	0	0+0	0	0+0	0
	MF	(Scotland) SCO	Nathan Blockley	31	3	25+1	2	2+0	0	1+0	1	2+0	0
	MF	(England) ENG	Jack Boyle	14	1	8+4	1	0+1	0	0+0	0	0+1	0
	MF	(Scotland) SCO	Alan Cook	13	3	9+2	2	1+0	0	0+1	1	0+0	0
	MF	(Scotland) SCO	Ross Davidson	5	0	5+0	0	0+0	0	0+0	0	0+0	0
	MF	(Scotland) SCO	Andrew Gilchrist	1	0	0+0	0	0+0	0	0+1	0	0+0	0
	MF	(Scotland) SCO	Thomas Robertson	1	0	0+1	0	0+0	0	0+0	0	0+0	0
	MF	(Scotland) SCO	Fraser Keast	0	0	0+0	0	0+0	0	0+0	0	0+0	0
	MF	(Scotland) SCO	Jack Haggarty	1	0	0+1	0	0+0	0	0+0	0	0+0	0
	MF	(England) ENG	Steven Hetherington	14	0	14+0	0	0+0	0	0+0	0	0+0	0
	MF	(Scotland) SCO	Sean Lynch	22	1	15+4	1	2+0	0	1+0	0	0+0	0
	MF	(Scotland) SCO	Christian McKenna	2	0	0+2	0	0+0	0	0+0	0	0+0	0
	MF	(Scotland) SCO	Josh Watt	13	2	8+3	1	0+0	0	0+0	0	2+0	1
	MF	(Scotland) SCO	Liam Watt	13	1	11+2	1	0+0	0	0+0	0	0+0	0
	MF	(Scotland) SCO	Jordan Wright	1	0	0+1	0	0+0	0	0+0	0	0+0	0
	FW	(Scotland) SCO	Jordan Allan	1	0	0+1	0	0+0	0	0+0	0	0+0	0
	FW	(Scotland) SCO	John Boyle	29	10	23+2	10	2+0	0	1+0	0	1+0	0
	FW	(Scotland) SCO	Lee Brown	1	0	0+1	0	0+0	0	0+0	0	0+0	0
	FW	(Scotland) SCO	Liam Buchanan	6	0	5+1	0	0+0	0	0+0	0	0+0	0
	FW	(Scotland) SCO	Liam Coogans	7	1	5+2	1	0+0	0	0+0	0	0+0	0
	FW	(Scotland) SCO	Ryan Donnelly	36	6	21+11	6	0+1	0	0+1	0	1+1	0
	FW	(Scotland) SCO	Paul di Giacomo	22	5	5+12	4	1+1	0	1+0	0	2+0	1
	FW	(Scotland) SCO	Jordan Kirkpatrick	5	1	2+3	1	0+0	0	0+0	0	0+0	0
	FW	(Scotland) SCO	Willie McLaren	32	4	17+10	3	1+1	1	1+0	0	0+2	0
	FW	(Scotland) SCO	Jordan Moore	9	2	6+3	2	0+0	0	0+0	0	0+0	0
	FW	(Scotland) SCO	Scott Morton	0	0	0+0	0	0+0	0	0+0	0	0+0	0
	FW	(Scotland) SCO	Owen Ronald	2	0	0+2	0	0+0	0	0+0	0	0+0	0
	FW	(Scotland) SCO	Scott Sally	1	0	0+1	0	0+0	0	0+0	0	0+0	0

=== Disciplinary record ===
Includes all competitive matches.

Last updated 5 May 2013

Nation	Position	Name	First Division		Challenge Cup		League Cup		Scottish Cup		Total	
Nation	Position	Name	Booked	Sent off (straight red)	Booked	Sent off (straight red)	Booked	Sent off (straight red)	Booked	Sent off (straight red)	Booked	Sent off (straight red)
(Scotland)	GK	Grant Adam	1	0	0	0	0	0	0	0	1	0
(Scotland)	GK	Kenny Arthur	1	0	0	0	0	0	0	0	1	0
(Scotland)	GK	Andrew Duncan	0	0	0	0	0	0	0	0	0	0
(Scotland)	GK	Robbie Thomson	0	0	0	0	0	0	0	0	0	0
(Scotland)	DF	Jamie Bain	4	0	0	0	0	0	0	0	4	0
(Scotland)	DF	Gregor Buchanan	5	0	0	0	0	0	1	0	6	0
(Scotland)	DF	Grant Drummond	1	0	0	0	0	0	0	0	1	0
(Scotland)	DF	Grant Evans	9	1	0	0	0	0	1	0	10	1
(Scotland)	DF	Graeme Goodall	0	0	0	0	0	0	0	0	0	0
(Scotland)	DF	Gavin Griffin	1	0	0	0	0	0	0	0	1	0
(Scotland)	DF	Michael Hart	3	0	0	0	0	0	0	0	3	0
(Scotland)	DF	Ricki Lamie	9	1	0	0	0	0	0	0	9	1
(Scotland)	DF	David Lilley	6	1	0	0	0	0	1	0	7	1
(Scotland)	DF	Cameron MacDonald	2	0	0	0	0	0	0	0	2	0
(Scotland)	DF	Chris O'Neil	5	0	0	0	0	0	0	0	5	0
(Scotland)	DF	Kieran Stallard	2	0	0	0	0	0	2	0	4	0
(Australia)	DF	Marc Warren	6	2	1	0	0	0	1	0	8	2
(Scotland)	MF	Jamie Barclay	1	0	0	0	0	0	0	0	1	0
(Scotland)	MF	Nathan Blockley	5	1	0	0	0	0	1	0	6	1
(England)	MF	Jack Boyle	2	1	1	0	0	0	0	0	3	1
(Scotland)	MF	Alan Cook	0	0	0	0	0	0	0	0	0	0
(Scotland)	MF	Ross Davidson	0	0	0	0	0	0	0	0	0	0
(Scotland)	MF	Andrew Gilchrist	0	0	0	0	0	0	0	0	0	0
(Scotland)	MF	Jack Haggarty	0	0	0	0	0	0	0	0	0	0
(England)	MF	Steven Hetherington	2	0	0	0	0	0	0	0	2	0
(Scotland)	MF	Fraser Keast	0	0	0	0	0	0	0	0	0	0
(Scotland)	MF	Sean Lynch	5	1	1	0	0	0	0	0	6	1
(Scotland)	MF	Christian McKenna	0	0	0	0	0	0	0	0	0	0
(Scotland)	MF	Josh Watt	1	0	0	0	0	0	1	0	2	0
(Scotland)	MF	Liam Watt	0	0	0	0	0	0	0	0	0	0
(Scotland)	MF	Jordan Wright	0	0	0	0	0	0	0	0	0	0
(Scotland)	FW	Jordan Allan	0	0	0	0	0	0	0	0	0	0
(Scotland)	FW	John Boyle	11	0	0	0	1	0	0	0	12	0
(Scotland)	FW	Lee Brown	0	0	0	0	0	0	0	0	0	0
(Scotland)	FW	Liam Buchanan	0	0	0	0	0	0	0	0	0	0
(Scotland)	FW	Liam Coogans	1	0	0	0	0	0	0	0	1	0
(Scotland)	FW	Ryan Donnelly	2	0	0	0	0	0	1	0	3	0
(Scotland)	FW	Paul di Giacomo	0	0	0	0	0	0	0	0	0	0
(Scotland)	FW	Jordan Kirkpatrick	0	0	0	0	0	0	0	0	0	0
(Scotland)	FW	Willie McLaren	3	0	1	0	0	0	1	0	5	0
(Scotland)	FW	Jordan Moore	1	0	0	0	0	0	0	0	1	0
(Scotland)	FW	Scott Morton	0	0	0	0	0	0	0	0	0	0
(Scotland)	FW	Owen Ronald	0	0	0	0	0	0	0	0	0	0
(Scotland)	FW	Scott Sally	0	1	0	0	0	0	0	0	0	1

=== Awards ===
Last updated 28 September 2012

Nation	Name	Award	Month
(Scotland)	John Boyle	Player of the Month	August

== Division summary ==
Round	1	2	3	4	5	6	7	8	9	10	11	12	13	14	15	16	17	18	19	20	21	22	23	24	25	26	27	28	29	30	31	32	33	34	35	36
Ground	H	A	H	H	A	A	H	H	A	A	H	A	H	A	H	A	H	H	A	A	H	A	H	H	A	A	H	A	H	H	A	A	H	A	H	A
Result	W	W	L	L	L	D	L	L	L	W	L	D	D	L	L	L	D	D	L	W	L	L	L	D	L	L	D	L	L	L	L	L	L	L	L	W
Position	2	1	3	5	6	6	7	8	8	8	8	9	9	9	9	9	9	9	9	9	9	10	10	10	10	10	10	10	10	10	10	10 (Note: Dunfermline were deducted 15 points shortly prior to this fixture altering league standings. This was as a result of them entering administration.)	10	10	10	10

Updated to match(es) played on 5 May 2013. Source:
A = Away; H = Home; W = Win; D = Draw; L = Loss

== Transfers ==
Willie McLaren was initially released by the club but later re-signed.

=== Players in ===
Player	From	Fee
(Scotland) Alan Cook	(Scotland) Stirling Albion	Free
(Scotland) Grant Evans	(Scotland) Greenock Morton	Free
(Scotland) Kenny Arthur	Unattached	Free
(Scotland) Paul di Giacomo	(Scotland) Greenock Morton	Free
(Australia) Marc Warren	(England) Sheffield United	Free
(Scotland) Michael Hart	(Scotland) St Johnstone	Free
(Scotland) Gavin Griffin	(Scotland) Partick Thistle	Free
(Scotland) Christian McKenna	(Scotland) Campsie Black Watch	Free
(England) Jack Boyle	Jersey Scottish	Free
(Scotland) Josh Watt	(Scotland) Motherwell	Loan
(Scotland) Grant Adam	(Scotland) St Mirren	Loan
(Scotland) Liam Buchanan	(Republic of Ireland) Sligo Rovers	Free
(Scotland) Ross Davidson	(Scotland) Kilmarnock	Loan
(England) Steven Hetherington	(Scotland) Motherwell	Loan
(Scotland) Jordan Kirkpatrick	(Scotland) Hamilton Academical	Free
(Scotland) Robbie Thomson	(Scotland) Celtic	Loan
(Scotland) Jordan Moore	(Scotland) Dundee United	Loan

=== Players out ===
Player	To	Fee
(Scotland) Rhys Devlin	(Scotland) East Stirlingshire	Free
(England) Graeme Owens	Free agent	Free
(Scotland) Phil Johnston	(Scotland) Dumbarton	Free
(Scotland) Jamie Stevenson	(Scotland) Cowdenbeath	Free
(Scotland) Derek Holmes	(Scotland) Arbroath	Free
(Scotland) Kevin Green	(Scotland) Albion Rovers	Free
(Scotland) Ricki Lamie	(Scotland) Bathgate Thistle	Loan
(Scotland) Graeme Goodall	(Scotland) Shotts Bon Accord	Loan
(Scotland) Paul Lovering	(Scotland) Pollok	Free
(Scotland) Scott Morton	(Scotland) Montrose	Free
(Scotland) Fraser Keast	(Scotland) Broxburn Athletic	Loan
(Scotland) Kieron Stallard	Free agent	Free
(Scotland) Michael Hart	(Scotland) Huntly	Free
(Scotland) Ricki Lamie	(Scotland) Clyde	Loan
(Scotland) Cameron MacDonald	(United States) Kitsap Pumas	Free
(Scotland) Liam Buchanan	(Scotland) Ayr United	Free
(Scotland) Scott Sally	(Scotland) Albion Rovers	Free
(England) Jack Boyle	Free agent	Free
