= 2012–13 Hamilton Academical F.C. season =

Hamilton Academical
2012–13 season
- Chairman: Les Gray
- Manager: Billy Reid (Until 3 April 2013); Alex Neil (interim) (From 3 April 2013)
- Stadium: New Douglas Park
- First Division: Fifth place
- Challenge Cup: First Round, lost to Airdrie United
- League Cup: Third Round, lost to St Mirren
- Scottish Cup: Quarter-final, lost to Falkirk
- Top goalscorer: League: Stevie May (25); All: Stevie May (26)
- Highest home attendance: 3,452 vs Falkirk Scottish Cup, 2 March 2013
- Lowest home attendance: 620 vs Annan Athletic League Cup, 4 August 2012
- Average home league attendance: League: 1,273

The 2012–13 season was Hamilton Academical's second consecutive season in the Scottish First Division, having been relegated from the Scottish Premier League at the end of the 2010–11 season. Hamilton also competed in the Challenge Cup, League Cup and the Scottish Cup.

== Summary ==
=== Season ===
During season 2012–13 Hamilton finished fifth in the Scottish First Division. They reached the first round of the Challenge Cup, the third round of the League Cup and the quarter-final of the Scottish Cup.

=== Management ===
Hamilton began the season under the management of Billy Reid. On 3 April 2013, Reid left the club by mutual consent after nearly eight years in charge of the team. Club captain Alex Neil and Hamilton's Academy director Frankie McAvoy took charge of the team until the end of the season on an interim basis.

== Results and fixtures ==
Win Draw Loss Postponed

=== Preseason ===
21 July 2012 Friendly	Hamilton Academical	2–0	Bolton Wanderers	New Douglas Park
15:00	Ryan 60'; Hendrie 67'	Bolton Report; Hamilton Report

24 July 2012 Friendly	Hamilton Academical	0–3	Motherwell	New Douglas Park
19:00		Report	McHugh 9', 43'; Hateley 83' (pen.)

=== Scottish First Division ===
11 August 2012 Scottish First Division	Raith Rovers	2–0	Hamilton Academical	Stark's Park
15:00	Graham 63' (Penalty), 86'	SFL Report		Attendance: 1,868; Referee: Madden

19 August 2012 Scottish First Division	Hamilton Academical	1–1	Greenock Morton	New Douglas Park
15:00	Crawford 81'; Neil (red card) 86'	SFL Report	O'Brien 15'; Tidser (yellow card) 45+3' (red card)	Attendance: 1,572; Referee: Allan

25 August 2012 Scottish First Division	Cowdenbeath	1–0	Hamilton Academical	Central Park
15:00	Miller 12'	SFL Report		Attendance: 525; Referee: Murray

1 September 2012 Scottish First Division	Partick Thistle	4–0	Hamilton Academical	Firhill Stadium
15:00	Welsh 41'; Craig 59', 86'; Steven Lawless 64'	SFL Report		Attendance: 2,603; Referee: McLean

15 September 2012 Scottish First Division	Hamilton Academical	1–1	Falkirk	New Douglas Park
15:00	Routledge 42'	SFL Report	Taylor 5'	Attendance: 1,174; Referee: Beaton

22 September 2012 Scottish First Division	Dumbarton	3–3	Hamilton Academical	Dumbarton Football Stadium
15:00	Kilday 34' (Own goal); Lister 73'; Prunty 77'	Report	Crawford 21'; Keatings 88', 95'	Attendance: 695; Referee: McKendrick

29 September 2012 Scottish First Division	Hamilton Academical	0–3	Dunfermline Athletic	New Douglas Park
15:00		SFL Report	Wallace 46', 70'; Thomson 89'	Attendance: 1,330; Referee: Charleston

6 October 2012 Scottish First Division	Airdrie United	0–4	Hamilton Academical	Excelsior Stadium
15:00		SFL Report	Crawford 67'; Longridge 72'; May 82', 88' (pen.)	Attendance: 868; Referee: O'Reilly

20 October 2012 Scottish First Division	Hamilton Academical	1–2	Livingston	New Douglas Park
15:00	May 1'; Neil (red card) 68'	SFL Report	Scougall 3'; McNulty 9'; McCann (yellow card) 74' (red card)	Attendance: 943; Referee: Salmond

27 October 2012 Scottish First Division	Hamilton Academical	0–1	Raith Rovers	New Douglas Park
15:00		SFL Report	Walker 45'	Attendance: 1,079; Referee: Colvin

10 November 2012 Scottish First Division	Greenock Morton	0–1	Hamilton Academical	Cappielow Park
15:00		SFL Report	May 21'	Attendance: 1,815; Referee: Robertson

16 November 2012 Scottish First Division	Hamilton Academical	1–0	Partick Thistle	New Douglas Park
19:45	Smith 41' (Own goal)	BBC Report; SFL Report	Paton (red card) 75'	Attendance: 2,450; Referee: Finnie

24 November 2012 Scottish First Division	Falkirk	2–1	Hamilton Academical	Falkirk Stadium
15:00	McGrandles 83'; Small 91'	SFL Report	Page 58'	Attendance: 2,682; Referee: Tumilty

8 December 2012 Scottish First Division	Hamilton Academical	P–P	Dumbarton	New Douglas Park
15:00		BBC Report

15 December 2012 Scottish First Division	Dunfermline Athletic	1–1	Hamilton Academical	East End Park
15:00	Barrowman 33'	SFL Report	May 17'	Attendance: 2,864; Referee: Thomson

18 December 2012 Scottish First Division	Hamilton Academical	P–P	Dumbarton	New Douglas Park
19:45		SFL Report
Note: Postponed due to Scottish Cup

26 December 2012 Scottish First Division	Hamilton Academical	3–0	Airdrie United	New Douglas Park
15:00	Longridge 15'; Neil 23'; Page 55'	SFL Report		Attendance: 1,179; Referee: Charleston

29 December 2012 Scottish First Division	Livingston	P–P	Hamilton Academical	Braidwood Motor Company Stadium
15:00		SFL Report
Note: Postponed due to waterlogged pitch

2 January 2013 Scottish First Division	Partick Thistle	P–P	Hamilton Academical	Firhill Stadium
15:00		BBC Report
Note: Postponed due to waterlogged pitch

5 January 2013 Scottish First Division	Hamilton Academical	1–1	Falkirk	New Douglas Park
15:00	Mackinnon 80'	SFL Report	Taylor 13'; Flynn (yellow card) 58' (red card)	Attendance: 1,423; Referee: Colvin

12 January 2013 Scottish First Division	Hamilton Academical	2–1	Cowdenbeath	New Douglas Park
15:00	Page 61'; May 65'; Neil (yellow card) 68' (yellow-red card)	SFL Report	Hemmings 24'	Attendance: 1,021; Referee: Brines

19 January 2013 Scottish First Division	Raith Rovers	0–2	Hamilton Academical	Stark's Park
15:00	Hill (red card) 83'	SFL Report	Ellis 89' (o.g.); May 90'	Attendance: 1,194; Referee: Salmond

26 January 2013 Scottish First Division	Dumbarton	3–1	Hamilton Academical	Dumbarton Football Stadium
15:00	Turner 34'; Gilhaney 56'; Page 90+1' (Own goal)	SFL Report	May 60'	Attendance: 878; Referee: Muir

9 February 2013 Scottish First Division	Hamilton Academical	1–2	Dunfermline Athletic	New Douglas Park
15:00	Gillespie 66'	SFL Report	Kirk 37'; Kane 64'	Attendance: 1,248; Referee: Madden

16 February 2013 Scottish First Division	Airdrie United	2–2	Hamilton Academical	Excelsior Stadium
15:00	Moore 64' (Penalty); Bain 90+5'	SFL Report	May 61', 90+6'	Attendance: 755; Referee: Somers

19 February 2013 Scottish First Division	Partick Thistle	1–0	Hamilton Academical	Firhill Stadium
19:45	Muirhead 55' (Penalty)	SFL Report		Attendance: 2,046; Referee: McKendrick

23 February 2013 Scottish First Division	Hamilton Academical	1–1	Livingston	New Douglas Park
15:00	May 90+1'	SFL Report	Russell 77'	Attendance: 914; Referee: Northcroft

5 March 2013 Scottish First Division	Hamilton Academical	2–1	Greenock Morton	New Douglas Park
19:45	Fisher 35'; Gordon 58'	SFL Report	O'Brien 8'	Attendance: 1,009; Referee: Clancy

9 March 2013 Scottish First Division	Cowdenbeath	1–1	Hamilton Academical	Central Park
15:00	Moore 38'	SFL Report	May 32'	Attendance: 370; Referee: Salmond

12 March 2013 Scottish First Division	Hamilton Academical	P–P	Dumbarton	New Douglas Park
19:45		BBC Report
Note: Postponed due to frozen pitch

16 March 2013 Scottish First Division	Hamilton Academical	0–2	Partick Thistle	New Douglas Park
15:00		SFL Report	Balatoni 44'; Elliott 84'	Attendance: 1,852; Referee: Finnie

19 March 2013 Scottish First Division	Livingston	P–P	Hamilton Academical	Braidwood Motor Company Stadium
19:45		BBC Report
Note: Postponed due to snow on pitch

23 March 2013 Scottish First Division	Falkirk	0–2	Hamilton Academical	Falkirk Stadium
15:00		SFL Report	Routledge 14'; Longridge 26'	Attendance: 2,616; Referee: Tumilty

27 March 2013 Scottish First Division	Livingston	P–P	Hamilton Academical	Braidwood Motor Company Stadium
19:45		SFL Report
Note: Postponed due to snow

30 March 2013 Scottish First Division	Hamilton Academical	2–3	Dumbarton	New Douglas Park
15:00	Fisher (red card) 34'; Ryan 63'; May 87'	SFL Report	McDougall 24'; Agnew 48'; McGinn 84'	Attendance: 943; Referee: Murray

2 April 2013 Scottish First Division	Hamilton Academical	2–1	Dumbarton	New Douglas Park
19:45	May 79', 85'	SFL Report	Lister 12'	Attendance: 775; Referee: Charleston

6 April 2013 Scottish First Division	Dunfermline Athletic	2–3	Hamilton Academical	East End Park
15:00	Thomson 36'; Husband 66' (Penalty)	SFL Report	McShane 2'; Devlin 57'; Canning 77'	Attendance: 4,697; Referee: Roache

9 April 2013 Scottish First Division	Hamilton Academical	5–0	Airdrie United	New Douglas Park
19:45	McShane 22'; May 9' (Penalty), 37', 74'; Devlin (yellow card) 86' (yellow-red card); Brophy 87'	SFL Report		Attendance: 850; Referee: Collum

13 April 2013 Scottish First Division	Livingston	0–3	Hamilton Academical	Braidwood Motor Company Stadium
15:00		Report	May 41' (Penalty), 43', 84'; Page (yellow card) 80' (yellow-red card)	Attendance: 1,607; Referee: Somers

16 April 2013 Scottish First Division	Livingston	0–0	Hamilton Academical	Braidwood Motor Company Stadium
19:45	Docherty (red card) 27'	SFL Report		Attendance: 787; Referee: McLean

20 April 2013 Scottish First Division	Hamilton Academical	2–0	Raith Rovers	New Douglas Park
15:00	May 52'; Ryan 90'	SFL Report		Attendance: 969; Referee: Allan

27 April 2013 Scottish First Division	Greenock Morton	0–2	Hamilton Academical	Cappielow
15:00		SFL Report	May 39', 55'	Attendance: 1,541; Referee: Muir

4 May 2013 Scottish First Division	Hamilton Academical	1–3	Cowdenbeath	New Douglas Park
15:00	May 27'; Ryan (red card) 31'	SFL Report	Linton 48'; Moore 72'; McKenzie 84'	Attendance: 1,434; Referee: Madden

=== Scottish Challenge Cup ===
28 July 2012 Scottish Challenge Cup round 1	Hamilton Academical	0–1	Airdrie United	New Douglas Park
15:00		SFL Report	McLaren 85'	Attendance: 1,005; Referee: Charleston

=== Scottish League Cup ===
4 August 2012 Scottish League Cup round 1	Hamilton Academical	2–0	Annan Athletic	New Douglas Park
15:00	Routledge 66'; Mackinnon 80'	SFL Report		Attendance: 620; Referee: Collum

28 August 2012 Scottish League Cup round 2	Hamilton Academical	1–0 (a.e.t.)	Partick Thistle	New Douglas Park
19:45	Crawford 107'	SFL Report		Attendance: 1,268; Referee: O'Reilly

25 September 2012 Scottish League Cup round 3	St Mirren	1–0	Hamilton Academical	St Mirren Park
19:45	Mair 92'	BBC Report; SFL Report		Attendance: 1,914; Referee: Allan

=== Scottish Cup ===
1 December 2012 Scottish Cup round 4	Dumbarton	P–P	Hamilton Academical	Dumbarton Football Stadium
15:00		BBC Report

4 December 2012 Scottish Cup round 4	Dumbarton	P–P	Hamilton Academical	Dumbarton Football Stadium
19:30		BBC Report

10 December 2012 Scottish Cup round 4	Dumbarton	P–P	Hamilton Academical	Dumbarton Football Stadium
19:30		BBC Report

12 December 2012 Scottish Cup round 4	Dumbarton	P – P	Hamilton Academical	Dumbarton Football Stadium
19:30		BBC Report

17 December 2012 Scottish Cup round 4	Dumbarton	1–3	Hamilton Academical	Dumbarton Football Stadium
19:30	Turner 58' (yellow card) 78' (yellow-red card)	BBC Report	Crawford 24'; Devlin 41'; Gillespie 75'	Attendance: 469; Referee: Madden

2 February 2013 Scottish Cup round 5	Dunfermline Athletic	0–2	Hamilton Academical	East End Park
15:00		BBC Report	May 51'; Routledge 61'	Attendance: 2,588; Referee: Beaton

2 March 2013 Scottish Cup QF	Hamilton Academical	1–2	Falkirk	New Douglas Park
15:00	Ryan 74'; Page (red card) 90+3'	BBC Report	Alston 44', 71'	Attendance: 3,452; Referee: Collum

== Player statistics ==
=== Captains ===
No.	P	Name	Country	No. games	Notes
	MF	Neil	(Scotland)	25	Club captain
	DF	Canning	(Scotland)	17	Vice-captain

Last updated: 7 May 2013
Source: Competitive match reports.
Competitive matches only
Matches started as captain only
Country: FIFA nationality; No.: Squad number; P: Position; Name: Player name; No. Games: Number of games started as captain.

=== Squad ===
Last updated 7 May 2013

No.	Pos	Nat	Player	Total		First Division		Challenge Cup		League Cup		Scottish Cup	
No.	Pos	Nat	Player	Apps	Goals	Apps	Goals	Apps	Goals	Apps	Goals	Apps	Goals
	GK	(Scotland) SCO	Kevin Cuthbert	43	0	36+0	0	1+0	0	3+0	0	3+0	0
	DF	(Scotland) SCO	Martin Canning	39	1	33+0	1	1+0	0	2+0	0	3+0	0
	DF	(Scotland) SCO	Michael Devlin	27	2	17+5	1	1+0	0	2+0	0	2+0	1
	DF	(Scotland) SCO	Ryan Finnie	4	0	4+0	0	0+0	0	0+0	0	0+0	0
	DF	(Scotland) SCO	Gary Fraser	14	0	5+5	0	1+0	0	1+1	0	0+1	0
	DF	(Scotland) SCO	Grant Gillespie	37	2	24+8	1	1+0	0	2+0	0	1+1	1
	DF	(Scotland) SCO	Ziggy Gordon	36	1	31+1	1	0+0	0	1+1	0	2+0	0
	DF	(Scotland) SCO	Stephen Hendrie	29	0	20+3	0	1+0	0	3+0	0	1+1	0
	DF	(England) ENG	Jordan Jivanda	0	0	0+0	0	0+0	0	0+0	0	0+0	0
	DF	(Scotland) SCO	Lee Kilday	6	0	4+1	0	0+0	0	1+0	0	0+0	0
	DF	(Scotland) SCO	Conner McGlinchey	14	0	11+0	0	1+0	0	1+0	0	1+0	0
	DF	(Scotland) SCO	Scott McMann	1	0	1+0	0	0+0	0	0+0	0	0+0	0
	DF	(England) ENG	Jonathan Page	24	3	21+1	3	0+0	0	0+0	0	2+0	0
	DF	(Scotland) SCO	Craig Watson	0	0	0+0	0	0+0	0	0+0	0	0+0	0
	MF	(Scotland) SCO	Eamonn Brophy	1	1	0+1	1	0+0	0	0+0	0	0+0	0
	MF	(Scotland) SCO	Ali Crawford	40	5	30+3	3	1+0	0	3+0	1	2+1	1
	MF	(Scotland) SCO	Gary Fisher	32	1	18+10	1	0+0	0	2+0	0	2+0	0
	MF	(Scotland) SCO	Jordan Kirkpatrick	4	0	0+2	0	0+0	0	1+1	0	0+0	0
	MF	(Scotland) SCO	Alex Neil	27	1	21+0	1	0+0	0	2+1	0	3+0	0
	MF	(England) ENG	Jon Routledge	40	4	34+0	2	0+0	0	3+0	1	3+0	1
	MF	(Scotland) SCO	Andy Ryan	34	3	3+24	2	1+0	0	1+2	0	0+3	1
	FW	(Scotland) SCO	James Keatings	10	2	2+6	2	0+0	0	1+1	0	0+0	0
	FW	(Scotland) SCO	Louis Longridge	38	3	22+10	3	0+1	0	2+0	0	3+0	0
	FW	(Scotland) SCO	Darian MacKinnon	29	2	17+7	1	0+1	0	0+1	1	3+0	0
	FW	(Scotland) SCO	James Martin	1	0	0+0	0	1+0	0	0+0	0	0+0	0
	FW	(Scotland) SCO	Stevie May	35	26	33+0	25	0+0	0	0+0	0	2+0	1
	FW	(Scotland) SCO	Jon McShane	18	2	9+6	2	1+0	0	2+0	0	0+0	0
	FW	(Scotland) SCO	Kieran Millar	0	0	0+0	0	0+0	0	0+0	0	0+0	0

=== Disciplinary record ===
Includes all competitive matches.

Last updated 7 May 2013

Nation	Position	Name	First Division		Challenge Cup		League Cup		Scottish Cup		Total	
Nation	Position	Name	Booked	Sent off (straight red)	Booked	Sent off (straight red)	Booked	Sent off (straight red)	Booked	Sent off (straight red)	Booked	Sent off (straight red)
(Scotland)	GK	Kevin Cuthbert	5	0	0	0	0	0	0	0	5	0
(Scotland)	DF	Martin Canning	6	0	0	0	0	0	0	0	6	0
(Scotland)	DF	Michael Devlin	5	1	1	0	1	0	1	0	8	1
(Scotland)	DF	Ryan Finnie	0	0	0	0	0	0	0	0	0	0
(Scotland)	DF	Gary Fraser	0	0	0	0	0	0	0	0	0	0
(Scotland)	DF	Grant Gillespie	9	0	0	0	0	0	1	0	10	0
(Scotland)	DF	Ziggy Gordon	5	0	0	0	1	0	0	0	6	0
(Scotland)	DF	Stephen Hendrie	1	0	0	0	0	0	0	0	1	0
(England)	DF	Jordan Jivanda	0	0	0	0	0	0	0	0	0	0
(Scotland)	DF	Lee Kilday	1	0	0	0	0	0	0	0	1	0
(Scotland)	DF	Conner McGlinchey	1	0	0	0	0	0	0	0	1	0
(Scotland)	DF	Scott McMann	0	0	0	0	0	0	0	0	0	0
(England)	DF	Jonathan Page	5	1	0	0	0	0	0	1	5	2
(Scotland)	DF	Craig Watson	0	0	0	0	0	0	0	0	0	0
(Scotland)	MF	Eamonn Brophy	0	0	0	0	0	0	0	0	0	0
(Scotland)	MF	Ali Crawford	0	0	0	0	1	0	0	0	1	0
(Scotland)	MF	Gary Fisher	4	1	0	0	1	0	0	0	5	1
(Scotland)	MF	Jordan Kirkpatrick	0	0	0	0	0	0	0	0	0	0
(Scotland)	MF	Alex Neil	8	3	0	0	0	0	1	0	9	3
(England)	MF	Jon Routledge	6	0	0	0	1	0	0	0	7	0
(Scotland)	MF	Andy Ryan	6	1	0	0	1	0	0	0	7	1
(Scotland)	FW	James Keatings	0	0	0	0	0	0	0	0	0	0
(Scotland)	FW	Louis Longridge	0	0	0	0	0	0	0	0	0	0
(Scotland)	FW	Darian MacKinnon	3	0	0	0	0	0	1	0	4	0
(Scotland)	FW	James Martin	0	0	0	0	0	0	0	0	0	0
(Scotland)	FW	Stevie May	4	0	0	0	0	0	0	0	4	0
(Scotland)	FW	Jon McShane	1	0	0	0	0	0	0	0	1	0
(Scotland)	FW	Kieran Millar	0	0	0	0	0	0	0	0	0	0

== Team statistics ==
=== League table ===
Pos	Team	Pld	W	D	L	GF	GA	GD	Pts
3	Falkirk	36	15	8	13	52	48	+4	53
4	Livingston	36	14	10	12	58	56	+2	52
5	Hamilton Academical	36	14	9	13	52	45	+7	51
6	Raith Rovers	36	11	13	12	45	48	−3	46
7	Dumbarton	36	13	4	19	58	83	−25	43

Source: SPFL Archive
Rules for classification: 1) points; 2) goal difference; 3) number of goals scored.

=== Division summary ===
Round	1	2	3	4	5	6	7	8	9	10	11	12	13	14	15	16	17	18	19	20	21	22	23	24	25	26	27	28	29	30	31	32	33	34	35	36
Ground	A	H	A	A	H	A	H	A	H	H	A	H	A	A	H	H	H	A	A	H	A	A	H	H	A	H	A	H	H	A	H	A	A	H	A	H
Result	L	D	L	L	D	D	L	W	L	L	W	W	L	D	W	D	W	W	L	L	D	L	D	W	D	L	W	L	W	W	W	W	D	W	W	L
Position	8	8	9	9	9	9	9	9	9	9	9	7	8	8	7	7	7	7	7	7	7	7	7	7	7	8	7	8	7	7	5 (Note: Dunfermline were deducted 15 points shortly prior to this fixture altering league standings. This was as a result of them entering administration.)	5	5	5	4	5

Updated to match(es) played on 7 May 2013. Source:
A = Away; H = Home; W = Win; D = Draw; L = Loss

== Transfers ==
=== Players in ===
Player	From	Fee
(Scotland) Jon McShane	(Scotland) St Mirren	Undisclosed
(Scotland) Kevin Cuthbert	(Scotland) Ayr United	Free
(Scotland) Darian MacKinnon	(Scotland) Clydebank	Free
(England) Jon Routledge	(England) Stockport County	Free
(Scotland) Gary Fisher	(Scotland) Kilmarnock	Loan
(Scotland) James Keatings	(Scotland) Celtic	Loan
(Scotland) Stevie May	(Scotland) St Johnstone	Loan
(Scotland) Scott Christie	(Scotland) Bo'ness United	Undisclosed
(England) Jonathan Page	(Scotland) Motherwell	Loan
(England) Jonathan Page	(Scotland) Motherwell	Free

=== Players out ===
Player	To	Fee
(Scotland) Mark McLaughlin	(Scotland) Greenock Morton	Free
(Scotland) Grant Anderson	(Scotland) Raith Rovers	Free
(Scotland) David Hutton	(Scotland) Greenock Morton	Free
(Scotland) Andrew Gibson		Free
(Scotland) Ciaran Johnston	Free agent	Free
(Scotland) Lewis Milton	Free agent	Free
(Scotland) Kyle Wilkie	(Scotland) Greenock Morton	Free
(Scotland) Jim McAlister	(Scotland) Dundee	Free
(England) Simon Mensing	(Scotland) Raith Rovers	Free
(Scotland) Darian MacKinnon	(Scotland) Ayr United	Loan
(Scotland) Lee Kilday	(Scotland) Stenhousemuir	Loan
(Scotland) Jordan Allan	(Scotland) Bo'ness United	Loan
(Scotland) Michael Selfridge	Free agent	Free
(Scotland) Jordan Kirkpatrick	(Scotland) Airdrie United	Free
(Scotland) Conner McGlinchey	(Scotland) Peterhead	Free
