= 2013–14 Kilmarnock F.C. season =

Kilmarnock
2013–14 season
- Chairman: Michael Johnston
- Manager: Allan Johnston
- Stadium: Rugby Park
- Premiership: Ninth Place
- Scottish Cup: Fourth Round
- League Cup: Second Round
- Top goalscorer: League: Kris Boyd (22); All: Kris Boyd (22)
- Highest home attendance: 7,495 vs. Celtic, Premiership, 14 March 2014
- Lowest home attendance: 2,033 vs. Hamilton Academical, League Cup, 27 August 2013
Home colours	Away colours

The 2013–14 season was Kilmarnock's first season in the newly formed Scottish Premiership. Kilmarnock also competed in the League Cup and the Scottish Cup.

== Summary ==
=== Season ===
In their first season under Allan Johnston, Kilmarnock finished ninth in the Scottish Premiership with 39 points. They reached the second round of the League Cup, losing to Hamilton, and the fourth round of the Scottish Cup, losing to Dundee United.

== Results & fixtures ==
Win Draw Loss Postponed

=== Pre season and friendlies ===
17 July 2013 Friendly	East Fife	0 – 1	Kilmarnock	Bayview Stadium, Methil
19:45		Report	Trialist 1'

20 July 2013 Friendly	Glentoran	0 – 2	Kilmarnock	The Oval, Belfast
14:00		Report	Heffernan (pen.)

26 July 2013 Friendly	Kilmarnock	2 – 2	Carlisle United	Rugby Park, Kilmarnock
19:45	Heffernan 3', 89'	Report	Beck 16', 52'

27 July 2013 Friendly	Kilmarnock	2 – 0	Newcastle U21s	Rugby Park, Kilmarnock
15:00	Slater 70'; Trialist 87'	Report

17 September 2013 Friendly	Greenock Morton	0 – 3	Kilmarnock	Broadwood Stadium, Cumbernauld
15:00		Report

=== Scottish Premiership ===
3 August 2013 Scottish Premiership	Aberdeen	2 – 1	Kilmarnock	Pittodrie Stadium
15:00	Hayes 21'; Flood 53'	Report	Boyd 64'	Referee: Crawford Allan

11 August 2013 Scottish Premiership	Kilmarnock	0 – 0	St Johnstone	Rugby Park
15:00		Report		Attendance: 3,550; Referee: Willie Collum

17 August 2013 Scottish Premiership	St Mirren	1 – 1	Kilmarnock	St Mirren Park
15:00	Harkins 65'	Report	Boyd 49'	Attendance: 4,625; Referee: John Beaton

24 August 2013 Scottish Premiership	Kilmarnock	1 – 2	Hibernian	Rugby Park
15:00	Nicholson 23'	Report	Craig 47', 80'	Attendance: 3,807; Referee: Kevin Clancy

31 August 2013 Scottish Premiership	Motherwell	2 – 1	Kilmarnock	Fir Park
15:00	Anier 20'; Sutton 45'	Report	McManus 17' (o.g.)	Attendance: 4,353; Referee: Craig Charleston

14 September 2013 Scottish Premiership	Kilmarnock	1 – 2	Inverness CT	Rugby Park
15:00	Nicholson 51'	Report	Foran 6'; McKay 56'	Attendance: 3,063; Referee: Steven McLean

21 September 2013 Scottish Premiership	Partick Thistle	1 – 1	Kilmarnock	Firhill Stadium
15:00	Muirhead 11' (pen.)	Report	Boyd 48'	Attendance: 4,310; Referee: Bobby Madden

28 September 2013 Scottish Premiership	Kilmarnock	2 – 5	Celtic	Rugby Park
12:30	Clingan 35'; Clohessy 42'	Report	Commons 20'; Samaras 24', 27', 88'; Baldé 90'	Attendance: 6,149; Referee: Beaton

5 October 2013 Scottish Premiership	Dundee United	1 – 0	Kilmarnock	Tannadice Park
15:00	Çiftçi 56'	Report		Attendance: 5,850; Referee: Willie Collum

19 October 2013 Scottish Premiership	Kilmarnock	2 – 0	Ross County	Rugby Park
15:00	Boyd 17'; Irvine 71'	Report		Attendance: 3,582; Referee: Stephen Finnie

26 October 2013 Scottish Premiership	Kilmarnock	2 – 0	Heart of Midlothian	Rugby Park
15:00	Boyd 16', 64'	Report		Attendance: 5,090; Referee: Kevin Clancy

2 November 2013 Scottish Premiership	Inverness CT	2 – 1	Kilmarnock	Caledonian Stadium
15:00	Doran 7'; Shinnie 52'	Report	Barr 76'	Attendance: 2,948; Referee: Steven McLean

9 November 2013 Scottish Premiership	St Johnstone	3 – 1	Kilmarnock	McDiarmid Park
	Hasselbaink 24'; May 31', 54' (pen.)	BBC Report	Irvine (yellow card) 52' (yellow-red card); Clohessy 69'; Barr (yellow card) 86' (yellow-red card)	Attendance: 2,855; Referee: Finnie

23 November 2013 Scottish Premiership	Kilmarnock	0 – 2	Motherwell	Rugby Park
		BBC Report	Sutton 55'; Anier 88'	Attendance: 3,704; Referee: Finnie

7 December 2013 Scottish Premiership	Ross County	1 – 2	Kilmarnock	Victoria Park
	Kettlewell 33'	BBC Report	Johnston 7'; Boyd 43'	Attendance: 2,937; Referee: Madden

14 December 2013 Scottish Premiership	Kilmarnock	1 – 4	Dundee United	Rugby Park
15:00	Kris Boyd 89'	BBC Report	Watson 60'; Armstrong 75'; Gauld 77'; Goodwillie 90'	Attendance: 3,452; Referee: Norris

21 December 2013 Scottish Premiership	Kilmarnock	2 – 1	Partick Thistle	Rugby Park
	Johnston 42'; Boyd 73'	Report	Doolan 49'	Attendance: 3,865; Referee: Thomson

26 December 2013 Scottish Premiership	Heart of Midlothian	0 – 4	Kilmarnock	Tynecastle Stadium
15:00		BBC Report	Boyd 13', 48'; Johnston 40'; McKenzie 90'	Attendance: 13,684; Referee: Beaton

29 December 2013 Scottish Premiership	Hibernian	3 – 0	Kilmarnock	Easter Road
15:00	Hanlon 12'; Cairney 77'; Stevenson 90'	BBC Report		Attendance: 9,683; Referee: Collum

2 January 2014 Scottish Premiership	Kilmarnock	2 – 1	St Mirren	Rugby Park
	McKenzie 29'; Boyd 91'	Report	Campbell 18'	Attendance: 5,410; Referee: Colvin

5 January 2014 Scottish Premiership	Kilmarnock	0 – 1	Aberdeen	Rugby Park
15:00		BBC Report	Reynolds 83'	Attendance: 4,073; Referee: Charleston

18 January 2014 Scottish Premiership	Partick Thistle	1 – 1	Kilmarnock	Firhill Stadium
15:00	Higginbotham 3'; Taylor-Sinclair (red card) 89'	BBC Report	Muirhead 91'	Attendance: 4,092; Referee: McLean

25 January 2014 Scottish Premiership	Kilmarnock	2 – 0	Inverness Caledonian Thistle	Rugby Park
15:00	Ashcroft 16'; Boyd 74'	BBC Report		Attendance: 3,035; Referee: Collum

29 January 2014 Scottish Premiership	Celtic	4 – 0	Kilmarnock	Celtic Park
19:45	Ledley 11'; Ashcroft 21' (o.g.); Mulgrew 68'; Baldé 90+1'	BBC Report		Attendance: 44,271; Referee: Colvin

1 February 2014 Scottish Premiership	Kilmarnock	2 – 2	Ross County	Rugby Park
15:00	Boyd 48', 90+2'	BBC Report	Arquin 30'; Songo'o 36'	Attendance: 3,372; Referee: Allan

15 February 2014 Scottish Premiership	Dundee United	3 – 2	Kilmarnock	Tannadice Park
15:00	Mackay-Steven 10'; Good 65'; Rankin 71'	BBC Report	Eremenko 40'; Boyd 64'	Attendance: 6,038; Referee: Beaton

22 February 2014 Scottish Premiership	Kilmarnock	1 – 1	Hibernian	Rugby Park
15:00	McKenzie 20'	BBC Report	Haynes 56'	Attendance: 4,036; Referee: Thomson

1 March 2014 Scottish Premiership	St Mirren	2 – 0	Kilmarnock	St Mirren Park
	Newton 79'; Wylde 88'	Report		Attendance: 4,650; Referee: Allan

8 March 2014 Scottish Premiership	Kilmarnock	4 – 2	Heart of Midlothian	Rugby Park
15:00	Wilson 27' (Own goal); Boyd 49', 51'; Gardyne 72'	BBC Sport	Carrick 30'; Nicholson 69'	Attendance: 3,510; Referee: Norris

14 March 2014 Scottish Premiership	Kilmarnock	0 – 3	Celtic	Rugby Park
19:45		BBC Report	Commons 57', 59', 86'	Attendance: 7,495; Referee: Collum

22 March 2014 Scottish Premiership	Aberdeen	2 – 1	Kilmarnock	Pittodrie Stadium
15:00	Rooney 17'; Jack 72'	BBC Report	Boyd 11'	Attendance: 17,029; Referee: Thomson

29 March 2014 Scottish Premiership	Motherwell	1 – 2	Kilmarnock	Fir Park
	Vigurs 41'	BBC Report	McKenzie 66'; Slater 90+6'	Attendance: 4,467; Referee: Madden

5 April 2014 Scottish Premiership	Kilmarnock	1 – 2	St Johnstone	Rugby Park
15:00	Muirhead 5'	BBC Report	Wright 31'; Anderson 44'	Attendance: 3,665; Referee: McLean

19 April 2014 Scottish Premiership	Kilmarnock	1 – 2	Partick Thistle	Rugby Park
15:00	Maksimenko 54'	BBC Report	Higginbotham 57'; Taylor-Sinclair 85'	Attendance: 4,980; Referee: Colvin

26 April 2014 Scottish Premiership	Ross County	2 – 1	Kilmarnock	Victoria Park
	Kiss 41'; Brittain 77' (pen.)	BBC Report	Boyd 88'	Attendance: 3,401; Referee: Clancy

4 May 2014 Scottish Premiership	Heart of Midlothian	5 – 0	Kilmarnock	Tynecastle Stadium
15:00	Stevenson 11', 24', 45+1'; King 56'; Paterson 60'	BBC News		Attendance: 13,656; Referee: Murray

7 May 2014 Scottish Premiership	Kilmarnock	1 – 0	St Mirren	Rugby Park
19:45	Boyd 21'	BBC Report		Attendance: 4,911; Referee: Muir

10 May 2014 Scottish Premiership	Hibernian	0 – 1	Kilmarnock	Easter Road
12:15		BBC Report	Boyd 44'	Attendance: 15,057; Referee: Thomson

=== Scottish League Cup ===
27 August 2013 Scottish League Cup second round	Kilmarnock	0 – 1	Hamilton Academical	Rugby Park
19:45		Report	Antoine-Curier 42'	Attendance: 2,033; Referee: Calum Murray

=== Scottish Cup ===
29 November 2013 Scottish Cup round 4	Dundee United	5 – 2	Kilmarnock	Tannadice Park
19:45	Robertson 27', 76'; Armstrong 64'; Graham 82' (pen.); Mackay-Steven 84'	BBC Report	Barr 48'; Johnston 50'	Attendance: 6,979; Referee: Calum Murray

== Player statistics ==
=== Squad ===
Last updated 10 May 2014

No.	Pos	Nat	Player	Total		Premiership		League Cup		Scottish Cup	
No.	Pos	Nat	Player	Apps	Goals	Apps	Goals	Apps	Goals	Apps	Goals
1	GK	(Scotland) SCO	Craig Samson	40	0	38+0	0	1+0	0	1+0	0
2	DF	(Netherlands) NED	Jeroen Tesselaar	38	0	36+0	0	1+0	0	1+0	0
4	MF	(Scotland) SCO	James Fowler	10	0	6+3	0	0+1	0	0+0	0
5	MF	(Australia) AUS	Jackson Irvine	29	1	25+2	1	1+0	0	1+0	0
6	DF	(Scotland) SCO	Darren Barr	14	2	12+0	1	1+0	0	1+0	1
7	MF	(Scotland) SCO	Barry Nicholson	24	2	14+9	2	0+1	0	0+0	0
8	MF	(Northern Ireland) NIR	Sammy Clingan	18	1	13+5	1	0+0	0	0+0	0
9	FW	(Scotland) SCO	Kris Boyd	37	22	35+1	22	0+0	0	1+0	0
10	FW	(Scotland) SCO	Chris Johnston	22	4	15+6	3	0+0	0	1+0	1
11	FW	(France) FRA	William Gros	16	0	4+10	0	1+0	0	0+1	0
12	GK	(Spain) ESP	Antonio Reguero	0	0	0+0	0	0+0	0	0+0	0
14	MF	(Sweden) SWE	David Moberg Karlsson	4	0	2+2	0	0+0	0	0+0	0
15	DF	(Scotland) SCO	Ross Barbour	7	0	6+1	0	0+0	0	0+0	0
16	DF	(England) ENG	Sean Clohessy	26	2	24+0	2	1+0	0	1+0	0
18	FW	(Scotland) SCO	Rory McKenzie	34	4	28+5	4	0+0	0	1+0	0
20	MF	(Finland) FIN	Alexei Eremenko	13	1	9+4	1	0+0	0	0+0	0
21	MF	(Northern Ireland) NIR	Jude Winchester	4	0	0+4	0	0+0	0	0+0	0
22	DF	(Latvia) LVA	Vitālijs Maksimenko	8	1	8+0	1	0+0	0	0+0	0
23	DF	(Northern Ireland) NIR	Rory McKeown	10	0	6+3	0	1+0	0	0+0	0
25	FW	(Scotland) SCO	Michael Gardyne	23	1	17+6	1	0+0	0	0+0	0
26	DF	(Scotland) SCO	Mark O'Hara	17	0	12+3	0	1+0	0	0+1	0
27	FW	(Scotland) SCO	Ross Davidson	0	0	0+0	0	0+0	0	0+0	0
28	MF	(Scotland) SCO	Craig Slater	23	1	20+2	1	0+0	0	1+0	0
29	MF	(Italy) ITA	Manuel Pascali	32	0	29+2	0	0+0	0	1+0	0
30	DF	(Scotland) SCO	Lee Ashcroft	25	1	23+2	1	0+0	0	0+0	0
33	FW	(Scotland) SCO	Robbie Muirhead	21	2	10+11	2	0+0	0	0+0	0
36	MF	(Scotland) SCO	Greg Kiltie	5	0	3+2	0	0+0	0	0+0	0
83	DF	(Algeria) ALG	Ismaël Bouzid	4	0	4+0	0	0+0	0	0+0	0
Players who left the club during the 2013–14 season
13	MF	(Nigeria) NGA	Reuben Gabriel	3	0	2+0	0	0+0	0	1+0	0
14	FW	(Republic of Ireland) IRL	Paul Heffernan	5	0	4+0	0	0+1	0	0+0	0
14	MF	(Cape Verde) CPV	David Silva	3	0	1+2	0	0+0	0	0+0	0
19	MF	(Nigeria) NGA	Rabiu Ibrahim	11	0	6+4	0	1+0	0	0+0	0
20	MF	(South Africa) RSA	Kyle Jacobs	6	0	5+0	0	1+0	0	0+0	0
22	FW	(Scotland) SCO	Mark Stewart	5	0	1+3	0	1+0	0	0+0	0
24	DF	(Scotland) SCO	Gary Fisher	1	0	1+0	0	0+0	0	0+0	0

=== Disciplinary record ===
Includes all competitive matches.

Last updated 10 May 2014

Number	Nation	Position	Name	Premier League		League Cup		Scottish Cup		Total	
Number	Nation	Position	Name	Booked	Sent off (straight red)	Booked	Sent off (straight red)	Booked	Sent off (straight red)	Booked	Sent off (straight red)
1	(Scotland)	GK	Craig Samson	2	0	0	0	0	0	2	0
2	(Netherlands)	DF	Jeroen Tesselaar	3	0	0	0	0	0	3	0
4	(Scotland)	MF	James Fowler	3	1	0	0	0	0	3	1
5	(Australia)	DF	Jackson Irvine	4	1	0	0	0	0	4	1
6	(Scotland)	MF	Darren Barr	3	1	1	0	0	0	4	1
7	(Scotland)	MF	Barry Nicholson	0	0	0	0	0	0	0	0
8	(Northern Ireland)	MF	Sammy Clingan	1	0	0	0	0	0	1	0
9	(Scotland)	FW	Kris Boyd	1	1	0	0	0	0	1	1
10	(Scotland)	FW	Chris Johnston	3	0	0	0	0	0	3	0
11	(France)	FW	William Gros	0	0	0	0	0	0	0	0
12	(Spain)	GK	Antonio Reguero	0	0	0	0	0	0	0	0
13	(Nigeria)	MF	Reuben Gabriel	2	1	0	0	1	0	3	1
14	(Republic of Ireland)	FW	Paul Heffernan	0	0	0	0	0	0	0	0
14	(Cape Verde)	MF	David Silva	0	0	0	0	0	0	0	0
14	(Sweden)	MF	David Moberg Karlsson	1	0	0	0	0	0	1	0
15	(Scotland)	DF	Ross Barbour	2	0	0	0	0	0	2	0
16	(Scotland)	DF	Sean Clohessy	5	0	0	0	0	0	5	0
18	(Scotland)	FW	Rory McKenzie	2	0	0	0	0	0	2	0
19	(Nigeria)	MF	Rabiu Ibrahim	0	0	0	0	0	0	0	0
20	(South Africa)	MF	Kyle Jacobs	0	0	0	0	0	0	0	0
20	(Finland)	MF	Alexei Eremenko	2	0	0	0	0	0	2	0
21	(Scotland)	MF	Jude Winchester	0	0	0	0	0	0	0	0
22	(Scotland)	FW	Mark Stewart	2	0	0	0	0	0	2	0
22	(Latvia)	DF	Vitālijs Maksimenko	0	0	0	0	0	0	0	0
23	(Northern Ireland)	DF	Rory McKeown	0	0	0	0	0	0	0	0
24	(Scotland)	DF	Gary Fisher	0	0	0	0	0	0	0	0
25	(Scotland)	FW	Michael Gardyne	2	0	0	0	0	0	2	0
26	(Scotland)	DF	Mark O'Hara	2	0	0	0	1	0	3	0
27	(Scotland)	FW	Ross Davidson	0	0	0	0	0	0	0	0
28	(Scotland)	MF	Craig Slater	3	0	0	0	0	0	3	0
29	(Italy)	MF	Manuel Pascali	16	0	0	0	0	0	16	0
30	(Scotland)	DF	Lee Ashcroft	2	0	0	0	0	0	2	0
33	(Scotland)	FW	Robbie Muirhead	1	0	0	0	0	0	1	0
36	(Scotland)	MF	Greg Kiltie	0	0	0	0	0	0	0	0
83	(Algeria)	DF	Ismaël Bouzid	1	0	0	0	0	0	1	0

== Team statistics ==
=== League table ===
Pos	Team	Pld	W	D	L	GF	GA	GD	Pts	Qualification or relegation
7	Ross County	38	11	7	20	44	62	−18	40	
8	St Mirren	38	10	9	19	39	58	−19	39	
9	Kilmarnock	38	11	6	21	45	66	−21	39	
10	Partick Thistle	38	8	14	16	46	65	−19	38	
11	Hibernian (R)	38	8	11	19	31	51	−20	35	Qualification for the Premiership play-off final

Source: SPFL Archive
Rules for classification: 1) points; 2) goal difference; 3) number of goals scored.
(R) Relegated

=== Division summary ===
Round	1	2	3	4	5	6	7	8	9	10	11	12	13	14	15	16	17	18	19	20	21	22	23	24	25	26	27	28	29	30	31	32	33	34	35	36	37	38
Ground	A	H	A	H	H	H	H	H	H	H	H	A	A	H	A	H	H	H	A	H	H	A	H	A	H	A	H	A	H	H	A	A	H	H	A	A	H	A
Result	L	D	D	L	L	L	D	L	L	W	W	L	L	L	W	L	W	W	L	W	L	D	W	L	D	L	D	L	W	L	L	W	L	L	L	L	W	W
Position	8	7	7	10	10	10	10	10	11	11	10	10	11	11	10	10	9	9	9	8	8	9	8	8	8	8	8	8	8	8	8	8	8	9	11	11	10	9

Updated to match(es) played on 10 May 2014. Source:
A = Away; H = Home; W = Win; D = Draw; L = Loss

== Transfers ==
=== Players in ===
Player	From	Fee
(Spain) Antonio Reguero	(Scotland) Inverness CT	Free
(Scotland) Craig Samson	(Scotland) St Mirren	Free
(Northern Ireland) Conor Brennan	(England) Leicester City	Free
(Scotland) Darren Barr	(Scotland) Heart of Midlothian	Free
(South Africa) Kyle Jacobs	(Scotland) Livingston	Free
(England) Sean Clohessy	(England) Southend United	Free
(Australia) Jackson Irvine	(Scotland) Celtic	Loan
(Scotland) Barry Nicholson	(England) Fleetwood Town	Free
(Scotland) Mark Stewart	(Scotland) Dundee	Free
(Scotland) Michael Gardyne	(Scotland) Dundee United	Loan
(Algeria) Ismaël Bouzid	Free Agent	Free
(Cape Verde) David Silva	(Portugal) Olhanense	Free
(Latvia) Vitālijs Maksimenko	(England) Brighton & Hove Albion	Loan
(Finland) Alexei Eremenko	(Kazakhstan) FC Kairat	Free
(Sweden) David Moberg Karlsson	(England) Sunderland	Loan

=== Players out ===
Player	To	Fee
(Scotland) James Dayton	(England) Oldham Athletic	Free
(Scotland) Cammy Bell	(Scotland) Rangers	Free
(Republic of Ireland) Cillian Sheridan	(Cyprus) APOEL	Undisclosed
(Scotland) Garry Hay	(Scotland) Airdrieonians	Free
(England) Danny Racchi	(Iceland) Valur	Free
(Spain) Borja Pérez	(Spain) Tenerife	Free
(Republic of Ireland) Paul Heffernan	(Scotland) Hibernian	Free
(Finland) Anssi Jaakkola	(South Africa) Ajax Cape Town	Free
(France) Mohamadou Sissoko	(Greece) Veria	Free
(Nigeria) Papa Idris	(Nigeria) Gombe United	Free
(Scotland) Ross Fisher	(Scotland) Queen's Park	Free
(Scotland) Ryan O'Leary	(United States) Los Angeles Blues	Free
(Scotland) Gary Fisher	(Scotland) East Fife	Loan
(Nigeria) Rabiu Ibrahim	Unattached	Free
(Nigeria) Reuben Gabriel	(Belgium) Waasland-Beveren	Free
(Scotland) Gary Fisher	(Scotland) East Fife	Free
(South Africa) Kyle Jacobs	(Scotland) Livingston	Free
(Scotland) James Fowler	(Scotland) Cowdenbeath	Loan
(Scotland) Mark Stewart	(Republic of Ireland) Derry City	Free
(Northern Ireland) Jude Winchester	(Northern Ireland) Cliftonville	Loan
(Cape Verde) David Silva	Unattached	Free
