= James Martin (footballer, born 1994) =

Scottish footballer

Personal information
- Date of birth: 4 October 1994 (age 32)
- Position: Striker

Youth career
- Hamilton Academical

Senior career*
Years	Team	Apps	(Gls)
2012–2013	Hamilton Academical	1	(0)
2013–2014	Partick Thistle	0	(0)
2014	→ K.V. Turnhout (loan)		
2014–2015	East Kilbride		
2015–2016	Preston Athletic		
2016–XXXX	Fauldhouse United		
- * Club domestic league appearances and goals as of 19:31, 3 February 2014 (UTC)

James Martin (born 4 October 1994) is a Scottish professional footballer who plays as a striker for Fauldhouse United. Martin previously played for Hamilton Academical, K.V. Turnhout and Partick Thistle.

== Career ==
=== Hamilton ===
In July 2011, whilst a member of the Hamilton's under 17 squad, he signed a professional contract with the club. On 17 January 2012, whilst still a member of the under 19 squad, Martin made his first team debut as a substitute in a 1–0 defeat to St Mirren in the Scottish Cup. He went on to make his first league appearance for Hamilton on 10 March, playing from the start in a 2–0 defeat to Ross County. On 13 March 2012, he signed a new contract, extending his stay with the club until 2014. On 29 May 2013 Martin's contract was cancelled by mutual consent.

=== Partick Thistle ===
On 23 July 2013, Martin signed for Scottish Premiership side Partick Thistle. He was given the squad number 35.

=== K.V. Turnhout ===
On 31 January 2014, Martin signed for K.V. Turnhout on loan until the end of the 2013–14 season.

== Career statistics ==
As of 23 July 2013

Appearances and goals by club, season and competition
Club	Season	League		FA Cup		League Cup		Other		Total	
Club	Season	Apps	Goals	Apps	Goals	Apps	Goals	Apps	Goals	Apps	Goals
Hamilton Academical	2011–12	1	0	1	0	0	0	0	0	2	0
Hamilton Academical	2012–13	0	0	0	0	0	0	0	0	2	0
Partick Thistle	2013–14	0	0	0	0	0	0	0	0	0	0
Career total		1	0	1	0	0	0	0	0	2	0
