= 2012–13 Motherwell F.C. season =

Motherwell
2012–13 season
- Chairman: Vacant
- Manager: Stuart McCall
- Stadium: Fir Park
- Scottish Premier League: 2nd
- Scottish Cup: Fourth round vs Aberdeen
- League Cup: Third round vs Rangers
- Champions League: Third qualifying round vs Panathinaikos
- Europa League: Play-off round vs Levante
- Top goalscorer: League: Michael Higdon (26); All: Michael Higdon (27)
- Highest home attendance: 10,496 vs Celtic; 29 September 2012
- Lowest home attendance: 3,649 vs St Johnstone; 20 January 2013
- Average home league attendance: 5,118
Home colours	Away colours	Third colours

The 2012–13 season will be Motherwell's fourteenth consecutive season in the Scottish Premier League, having competed in it since its inauguration in 1998–99. Motherwell will also compete in the Champions League, Europa League, League Cup and the Scottish Cup.

== Season events ==
On 24 July, Motherwell announced the signing of Simon Ramsden to a one-year contract after his Bradford City contract had expired.

On 10 August, Motherwell announced the loan signing of Fraser Kerr from Birmingham City until January.

On 4 December, Motherwell announced that they had extended their contract with Adam Cummins until the summer of 2015.

On 4 January, Fraser Kerr extended his loan contract with Motherwell until the end of the season.

On 9 January, Motherwell announced the loan signing of Kallum Higginbotham from Huddersfield Town until the end of the season.

On 18 February, Motherwell announced the return of James McFadden on a contract until the end of the season after his short-term Sunderland contract had expired.

On 21 March, Motherwell announced that they had extended their contract with Stuart Carswell until the summer of 2015.

On 26 March, Motherwell announced that they had extended their contract with Bob McHugh until the summer of 2015.

On 17 May, Motherwell announced that they had signed a new two-year contract with Simon Ramsden.

== Squad ==
As of match played 19 May 2013

No.	Name	Nationality	Position	Date of birth (age)	Signed from	Signed in	Contract ends	Apps.	Goals
Goalkeepers
1	Darren Randolph	(Republic of Ireland)	GK	12 May 1987 (aged 26)	Unattached	2010	2013	136	0
12	Lee Hollis	(Scotland)	GK	27 March 1986 (aged 27)	Unattached	2010	2014	6	0
43	Ross Stewart	(Scotland)	GK	10 April 1995 (aged 18)	Academy	2012		1	0
Defenders
2	Steven Saunders	(Scotland)	DF	30 March 1991 (aged 22)	Academy	2008		74	2
3	Steven Hammell	(Scotland)	DF	18 February 1982 (aged 31)	Southend United	2008	2014	465	4
5	Shaun Hutchinson	(England)	DF	23 November 1990 (aged 22)	Academy	2009	2014	104	8
15	Simon Ramsden	(England)	DF	17 December 1981 (aged 31)	Unattached	2012	2015	31	0
19	Fraser Kerr	(Scotland)	DF	17 January 1993 (aged 20)	on loan from Birmingham City	2012	2013	20	0
26	Zaine Francis-Angol	(Antigua and Barbuda)	DF	30 June 1993 (aged 19)	Tottenham Hotspur	2011	2015	25	0
30	Adam Cummins	(England)	DF	3 March 1993 (aged 20)	Everton	2011	2015	29	1
Midfielders
4	Nicky Law	(England)	MF	29 March 1988 (aged 25)	Rotherham United	2011	2013	86	13
6	Tom Hateley	(England)	MF	12 September 1989 (aged 23)	Unattached	2009	2013	177	13
7	Chris Humphrey	(Jamaica)	MF	19 September 1987 (aged 25)	Unattached	2009	2012	163	9
14	Keith Lasley	(Scotland)	MF	21 September 1979 (aged 33)	Unattached	2006	2014	341	20
17	Omar Daley	(Jamaica)	MF	25 April 1981 (aged 32)	Unattached	2011	2013	44	4
26	Stuart Carswell	(Scotland)	MF	9 September 1993 (aged 19)	Academy	2011	2015	46	0
Forwards
8	Henrik Ojamaa	(Estonia)	FW	20 May 1991 (aged 21)	RoPS	2012	2014	65	13
9	Michael Higdon	(England)	FW	2 September 1983 (aged 29)	Unattached	2011	2013	83	43
11	Kallum Higginbotham	(England)	FW	15 June 1989 (aged 23)	on loan from Huddersfield Town	2013	2013	10	1
16	Bob McHugh	(Scotland)	FW	16 July 1991 (aged 21)	Academy	2007	2015	76	6
20	James McFadden	(Scotland)	FW	14 April 1983 (aged 30)	Unattached	2013	2013	83	37
Away on loan
27	Steven Hetherington	(England)	MF	9 March 1993 (aged 20)	Rangers	2011		4	0
	Adam Asghar	(Scotland)	DF	26 July 1994 (aged 18)	Academy	2012		0	0
	Nicky Devlin	(Scotland)	DF	17 October 1993 (aged 19)	Dumbarton	2011		0	0
	Dominic Green	(Scotland)	MF	13 February 1995 (aged 18)	Academy	2012		0	0
	Josh Watt	(Scotland)	MF	31 August 1993 (aged 19)	Academy	2012		0	0
	Craig Moore	(Scotland)	FW	16 August 1994 (aged 18)	Academy	2011		0	0
Left during the season
11	Jamie Murphy	(Scotland)	FW	28 August 1989 (aged 23)	Academy	2006	2013	215	50
20	Jonathan Page	(England)	DF	8 February 1990 (aged 23)	Portsmouth	2008		26	3

== Transfers ==
=== In ===
Date	Position	Nationality	Name	From	Fee	Ref
24 July 2012	DF	(England)	Simon Ramsden	Unattached	Free	
18 February 2013	FW	(Scotland)	James McFadden	Unattached	Free	

=== Out ===
Date	Position	Nationality	Name	To	Fee	Ref
3 January 2013	FW	(Scotland)	Jamie Murphy	Sheffield United	Undisclosed	

=== Loans in ===
Date from	Position	Nationality	Name	From	Date to	Ref.
10 August 2012	DF	(Scotland)	Fraser Kerr	Birmingham City	Season-Long	
9 January 2013	FW	(England)	Kallum Higginbotham	Huddersfield Town	End of Season	

=== Loans out ===
Date from	Position	Nationality	Name	To	Date to	Ref.
17 August 2012	DF	(Scotland)	Nicky Devlin	Dumbarton	3 February 2013	
27 September 2012	DF	(England)	Jonathan Page	Hamilton Academical	31 December 2012	
17 October 2012	MF	(Scotland)	Josh Watt	Airdrie United	17 January 2013	
30 January 2013	FW	(Scotland)	Craig Moore	Cowdenbeath	End of Season	
7 February 2013	MF	(England)	Steven Hetherington	Airdrie United	End of Season	
5 March 2013	MF	(Scotland)	Josh Watt	Raith Rovers	End of Season	
6 March 2013	MF	(Scotland)	Dominic Green	Partick Thistle	End of Season	
16 March 2013	DF	(Scotland)	Nicky Devlin	Stenhousemuir	End of Season	
29 March 2013	MF	(Scotland)	Adam Asghar	Dumbarton	End of Season	

=== Released ===
Date	Position	Nationality	Name	Joined	Date	Ref.
31 December 2012	DF	(England)	Jonathan Page	Hamilton Academical	3 January 2013	
31 December 2012	FW	(Scotland)	Salim Kouider-Aïssa	Stenhousemuir	29 March 2013	
31 May 2013	GK	(Republic of Ireland)	Darren Randolph	Birmingham City	1 July 2013	
31 May 2013	DF	(England)	Tom Hateley	Tranmere Rovers	21 September 2013	
31 May 2013	DF	(Scotland)	Nicky Devlin	Stenhousemuir	10 June 2013	
31 May 2013	DF	(Scotland)	Steven Saunders	Ross County	8 July 2013	
31 May 2013	MF	(England)	Steven Hetherington	Celtic Nation		
31 May 2013	MF	(England)	Nicky Law	Rangers	24 May 2013	
31 May 2013	MF	(Jamaica)	Omar Daley	Minnesota United	24 August 2013	
31 May 2013	MF	(Jamaica)	Chris Humphrey	Preston North End	1 July 2013	
20 May 2013	MF	(Scotland)	Adam Asghar	Alloa Athletic	23 July 2014	
20 May 2013	MF	(Scotland)	Dominic Green			
31 May 2013	MF	(Scotland)	Josh Watt	ÍA	24 July 2013	
31 May 2013	FW	(England)	Michael Higdon	NEC Nijmegen	8 July 2013	
31 May 2013	FW	(Scotland)	James McFadden	Re-signed	19 July 2023	

== Friendlies ==
9 July 2012	Rapid București	Cancelled	Motherwell	Grangemouth
15:00 BST (UTC+1)				Stadium: Grangemouth Stadium
Note: Match was cancelled on 9 July, due to a waterlogged pitch at the Grangemouth Stadium.

14 July 2012	Ayr United	4–0	Motherwell	Ayr
15:00 BST (UTC+1)	Robertson 19'; Moffat 24'; Campbell 47'; Sinclair 71'	Report		Stadium: Somerset Park; Attendance: 825; Referee: Steven McLean

17 July 2012	Raith Rovers	1–1	Motherwell	Kirkcaldy
19:45 BST (UTC+1)	Clarke 83'	Report	Murphy 67'	Stadium: Stark's Park

18 July 2012	Arbroath	Cancelled	Motherwell	Arbroath
19:45 BST (UTC+1)				Stadium: Gayfield Park
Note: Match was cancelled on 18 July, due to a waterlogged pitch at the Gayfield Park.

21 July 2012 Steven Hammell Testimonial	Motherwell	1–1	Everton	Motherwell
15:00 BST (UTC+1)	Law 54'	Report	Duffy 34'	Stadium: Fir Park

24 July 2012	Hamilton Academical	0–3	Motherwell	Hamilton
19:45 BST (UTC+1)		Report	McHugh 8', 43'; Hateley 82' (pen.)	Stadium: New Douglas Park

== Competitions ==
=== Overview ===
Competition	First match	Last match	Starting round	Final position	Record							
Competition	First match	Last match	Starting round	Final position	Pld	W	D	L	GF	GA	GD	Win %
Premier League	4 August 2012	19 May 2013	Matchday 1	2nd	38	18	9	11	67	51	+16	47.37
Scottish Cup	1 December 2012	11 December 2012	Fourth round	Fourth round	2	0	1	1	2	3	−1	0.00
League Cup	26 September 2012	26 September 2012	Third round	Third round	1	0	0	1	0	2	−2	0.00
UEFA Champions League	31 July 2012	8 August 2012	Third qualifying round	Third qualifying round	1	0	0	1	0	5	−5	0.00
UEFA Europa League	23 August 2012	30 August 2012	Play-off round	Play-off round	1	0	0	1	0	3	−3	0.00
Total					43	18	10	15	69	64	+5	41.86

Last updated: 19 May 2013
Source: Soccerway

=== League table ===
Pos	Team	Pld	W	D	L	GF	GA	GD	Pts	Qualification or relegation
1	Celtic (C)	38	24	7	7	92	35	+57	79	Qualification for the Champions League second qualifying round
2	Motherwell	38	18	9	11	67	51	+16	63	Qualification for the Europa League third qualifying round
3	St Johnstone	38	14	14	10	45	44	+1	56	Qualification for the Europa League second qualifying round
4	Inverness Caledonian Thistle	38	13	15	10	64	60	+4	54	
5	Ross County	38	13	14	11	47	48	−1	53	

Source: SPFL Archive
Rules for classification: 1) points; 2) goal difference; 3) number of goals scored.
(C) Champions

==== Results summary ====
Overall								Home						Away					
Pld	W	D	L	GF	GA	GD	Pts	W	D	L	GF	GA	GD	W	D	L	GF	GA	GD
38	18	9	11	67	51	+16	63	9	6	4	35	24	+11	9	3	7	32	27	+5

Source: BBC Sport

==== Results by round ====
Round	1	2	3	4	5	6	7	8	10	11	12	9	13	14	15	16	17	18	19	20	21	22	23	26	27	25	28	29	24	30	31	32	33	34	35	36	37	38
Ground	A	H	A	H	H	A	A	H	A	H	A	H	H	A	H	A	H	A	A	H	H	A	H	A	H	H	A	H	A	A	H	A	H	A	H	A	H	A
Result	D	D	W	D	W	W	D	L	L	L	W	L	D	W	D	W	W	W	L	W	D	L	W	L	W	L	L	W	W	D	W	W	D	W	W	L	W	L
Position	7	7	2	5	1	1	1	2	6	6	6	6	7	4	4	5	3	2	2	3	3	3	3	3	2	2	3	2	2	2	2	2	2	2	2	2	2	2

Source: BBC Sport
A = Away; H = Home; W = Win; D = Draw; L = Loss

==== Results ====
4 August 2012 1	Ross County	0–0	Motherwell	Dingwall
15:00 BST (UTC+1)	Brittain (yellow card) 87'	Report		Stadium: Victoria Park; Attendance: 4,828; Referee: Alan Muir

11 August 2012 2	Motherwell	1–1	St Johnstone	Motherwell
15:00 BST (UTC+1)	Ramsden (yellow card) 19'; Hammell (red card) 57'; McHugh 78'	Report	Vine (yellow card) 23' (red card) 80'; Davidson 58'; Craig (yellow card) 76'	Stadium: Fir Park; Attendance: 4,490; Referee: Iain Brines

18 August 2012 3	Kilmarnock	1–2	Motherwell	Kilmarnock
15:00 BST (UTC+1)	Kelly (yellow card) 26'; Harkins 30'; Nelson (yellow card) 90'	Report	Murphy 12', 37'; Higdon (yellow card) 23'; Hutchinson (yellow card) 86'	Stadium: Rugby Park; Attendance: 4,969; Referee: Stephen Finnie

26 August 2012 4	Motherwell	1–1	St Mirren	Motherwell
15:00 BST (UTC+1)	Higdon 2'; Hutchinson (yellow card) 84' (red card) 88'; Hetherington (yellow card) 85'	Report	Mair (yellow card) 10'; McGowan (yellow card) 74'; Carey (yellow card) 75'; Reilly 90+4'	Stadium: Fir Park; Attendance: 4,559; Referee: Euan Norris

2 September 2012 5	Motherwell	4–1	Inverness Caledonian Thistle	Motherwell
15:00 BST (UTC+1)	Hateley 11'; Higdon 12', 72', 79'; Page (yellow card) 80'	Report	Foran 28'; Shinnie (yellow card) 62'	Stadium: Fir Park; Attendance: 4,031; Referee: Stevie O'Reilly

15 September 2012 6	Dundee	1–2	Motherwell	Dundee
15:00 BST (UTC+1)	Nish 20'	Report	Higdon 74', 85'; Lasley (yellow card) 90'; Law (yellow card) 90+1'	Stadium: Dens Park; Attendance: 5,176; Referee: Kevin Clancy

23 September 2012 7	Aberdeen	3–3	Motherwell	Aberdeen
12:45 BST (UTC+1)	Rae 6'; McGinn 84'; Magennis 90+2'	Report	Kerr (yellow card) 18'; Hutchinson (yellow card) 28' (goal) 48'; Higdon 42'; Law 82'; Hammell (yellow card) 86'	Stadium: Pittodrie; Attendance: 8,557; Referee: Bobby Madden

29 September 2012 8	Motherwell	0–2	Celtic	Motherwell
15:00 BST (UTC+1)	Hutchinson (yellow card) 14'; Cummins (red card) 56'; Daley (yellow card) 85'	Report	Brown (yellow card) 26'; Hooper 32'; Cummins 35' (o.g.); Ambrose (yellow card) 84'	Stadium: Fir Park; Attendance: 10,496; Referee: Iain Brines

21 October 2012 10	Hearts	1–0	Motherwell	Edinburgh
12:45 BST (UTC+1)	Grainger 14'; Driver (yellow card) 32'; Žaliūkas (yellow card) 60'; Robinson (yellow card) 76'; Taouil (yellow card) 82'	Report		Stadium: Tynecastle Stadium; Attendance: 11,572; Referee: Willie Collum

26 October 2012 11	Motherwell	0–4	Hibernian	Motherwell
19:45 BST (UTC+1)	Randolph (yellow card) 63'; Daley (yellow card) 73'	Report	Wotherspoon 28'; Taiwo (yellow card) 39'; Cairney (yellow card) 39'; Griffiths 64' (pen.), 74' (pen.); McPake (yellow card) 71'; Handling 90+6'	Stadium: Fir Park; Attendance: 5,301; Referee: Stevie O'Reilly

3 November 2012 12	St Johnstone	1–3	Motherwell	Perth
15:00 GMT (UTC)	Wright (yellow card) 33'; Robertson 88'	Report	Murphy 1', 38'; Lasley (yellow card) 63'; Law 73'	Stadium: McDiarmid Park; Attendance: 3,112; Referee: Brian Colvin

7 November 2012 9	Motherwell	0–1	Dundee United	Motherwell
19:45 GMT (UTC)	Cummins (yellow card) 90+3'	Report	Gunning (yellow card) 61'; Rankin (yellow card) 73'; Russell 84'; Millar (yellow card) 90+4'	Stadium: Fir Park; Attendance: 3,941; Referee: Alan Muir
Note: Match originally scheduled for 6 October, but postponed due to a power failure in the area on the matchday.

10 November 2012 13	Motherwell	1–1	Dundee	Motherwell
15:00 GMT (UTC)	Higdon 45'	Report	Riley 28'; Lockwood (yellow card) 68'; Irvine (yellow card) 89'	Stadium: Fir Park; Attendance: 4,318; Referee: John Beaton

18 November 2012 14	Inverness Caledonian Thistle	1–5	Motherwell	Inverness
12:45 GMT (UTC)	Foran 47'	Report	Higdon 18'; Murphy 21'; Cummins 52'; Ojamaa 72'; Daley 89'	Stadium: Caledonian Stadium; Attendance: 2,948; Referee: Euan McLean

24 November 2012 15	Motherwell	0–0	Hearts	Motherwell
15:00 BST (UTC+1)	Hammell (yellow card) 24'	Report	Grainger (yellow card) 48'	Stadium: Fir Park; Attendance: 4,147; Referee: Crawford Allan

27 November 2012 16	Dundee United	1–2	Motherwell	Dundee
19:45 GMT (UTC)	Daly 37'	Report	Higdon 7'; Humphrey 10'; Hutchinson (yellow card) 40'	Stadium: Tannadice; Attendance: 5,289; Referee: Bobby Madden

8 December 2012 17	Motherwell	3–2	Ross County	Motherwell
15:00 GMT (UTC)	Higdon 25'; Law 46'; Lasley 82'	Report	Quinn 17', 70'; Boyd (yellow card) 31'	Stadium: Fir Park; Attendance: 3,739; Referee: Calum Murray

15 December 2012 18	Hibernian	2–3	Motherwell	Edinburgh
15:00 GMT (UTC)	McPake (yellow card) 31' (yellow-red card) 90+3'; Doyle 41', 55'; Wotherspoon (yellow card) 87'	Report	Cummins (yellow card) 17'; Murphy 64', 80'; McHugh 88'	Stadium: Easter Road; Attendance: 8,817; Referee: Euan McLean

21 December 2012 19	St Mirren	2–1	Motherwell	Paisley
19:45 GMT (UTC)	Thompson 39', 42'; McAusland (yellow card) 85'	Report	McHugh 77'	Stadium: St Mirren Park; Attendance: 4,023; Referee: Ian Brines

26 December 2012 20	Motherwell	4–1	Aberdeen	Motherwell
15:00 GMT (UTC)	Hateley 9'; Murphy 31', 45'; Higdon (yellow card) 48' (goal) 55'	Report	Hayes 34'; Robertson (yellow card) 66'	Stadium: Fir Park; Attendance: 5,093; Referee: Craig Thomson

29 December 2012 21	Motherwell	2–2	Kilmarnock	Motherwell
15:00 GMT (UTC)	Hateley (yellow card) 68'; Murphy 71'; Ojamaa 74'	Report	Perez 13'; Heffernan 62' (yellow card) 62'	Stadium: Fir Park; Attendance: 4,903; Referee: Crawford Allan

2 January 2013 22	Celtic	1–0	Motherwell	Glasgow
15:00 GMT (UTC)	Mulgrew (yellow card) 31'; Kayal (yellow card) 49'; Hooper 79'; Wanyama (yellow card) 75'; Forster (yellow card) 75'	Report	Ojamaa (yellow card) 54'; Lasley (yellow card) 88'	Stadium: Celtic Park; Attendance: 48,002; Referee: Euan McLean

20 January 2013 23	Motherwell	3–2	St Johnstone	Motherwell
14:15 GMT (UTC)	Higdon 8', 20', 69'	Report	Mackay (yellow card) 71'; Hasselbaink 77'; Craig 79'	Stadium: Fir Park; Attendance: 3,649; Referee: Willie Collum

9 February 2013 26	Kilmarnock	2–0	Motherwell	Kilmarnock
15:00 GMT (UTC)	Hammell 13' (o.g.); Tesselaar (yellow card) 52'; Gros 71'	Report	Humphrey (yellow card) 77'; Hateley (yellow card) 80'; Kerr (red card) 84'; Lasley (red card) 89'	Stadium: Rugby Park; Attendance: 4,246; Referee: Euan McLean

16 February 2013 27	Motherwell	3–0	Inverness Caledonian Thistle	Motherwell
15:00 GMT (UTC)	Higdon 30', 56'; Law 52'	Report	Warren (yellow card) 28'; Tudur Jones (yellow card) 60'	Stadium: Fir Park; Attendance: 4,179; Referee: Calum Murray

19 February 2013 25	Motherwell	0–1	Dundee United	Motherwell
19:45 GMT (UTC)	Hutchinson (yellow card) 47'	Report	Russell 17' (yellow card) 90+1'; Armstrong (yellow card) 52'	Stadium: Fir Park; Attendance: 4,633; Referee: Stephen Finnie
Note: Match originally scheduled for 29 January, but postponed due to a waterlogged pitch.

23 February 2013 28	Ross County	3–0	Motherwell	Dingwall
15:00 GMT (UTC)	Sproule 34'; Ikonomou (yellow card) 62'; Brittain 71' (yellow card) 74'; Vigurs 89'	Report	Ramsden (yellow card) 61'; Hutchinson (yellow card) 80'	Stadium: Victoria Park; Attendance: 3,797; Referee: Willie Collum

27 February 2013 29	Motherwell	2–1	Celtic	Motherwell
19:45 GMT (UTC)	Humphrey 31'; Higdon 73'	Report	Kayal (yellow card) 42'; Samaras 63'; Wanyama (yellow card) 64'	Stadium: Fir Park; Attendance: 8,641; Referee: Ian Brines

2 March 2013 24	Hearts	1–2	Motherwell	Edinburgh
12:45 GMT (UTC)	Sutton 59'	Report	Higdon 3'; McGowan 8' (o.g.); Ojamaa (yellow card) 48'; McFadden (yellow card) 70'	Stadium: Tynecastle Stadium; Attendance: 11,048; Referee: Craig Thomson

9 March 2013 30	Aberdeen	0–0	Motherwell	Aberdeen
15:00 GMT (UTC)		Report	Hateley (yellow card) 66'	Stadium: Pittodrie; Attendance: 8,210; Referee: Kevin Clancy

15 March 2013 31	Motherwell	4–1	Hibernian	Motherwell
19:45 GMT (UTC)	Higdon 48'; McFadden 54'; Ojamaa (yellow card) 58'; Higginbotham 67'; Hateley 84'	Report	Taiwo 23'; Maybury (yellow card) 82'	Stadium: Fir Park; Attendance: 5,108; Referee: Willie Collum

30 March 2013 32	Dundee	0–3	Motherwell	Dundee
15:00 GMT (UTC)	Riley (yellow card) 59'	Report	Higdon 9'; Hutchinson (yellow card) 23'; Law 63', 79'	Stadium: Dens Park; Attendance: 4,838; Referee: Euan McLean

6 April 2013 33	Motherwell	2–2	St Mirren	Motherwell
15:00 BST (UTC+1)	Higdon 34'; McFadden 84'	Report	Newton 41'; Guy 75'; Parkin (yellow card) 88'	Stadium: Fir Park; Attendance: 5,414; Referee: Brian Colvin

19 April 2013 34	Dundee United	1–3	Motherwell	Dundee
19:30 BST (UTC+1)	Daly 69'; McLean (yellow card) 85'	Report	Higdon 2', 55'; Ojamaa 8' (yellow card) 90'; Ramsden (yellow card) 75'; Hammell (yellow card) 83'	Stadium: Tannadice; Attendance: 5,634; Referee: John Beaton

28 April 2013 35	Motherwell	3–1	Celtic	Motherwell
12:45 BST (UTC+1)	Hutchinson (yellow card) 3'; Ojamaa 45'; Higdon 50' (pen.) (yellow card) 63'; Forster 55' (o.g.); Lasley (yellow card) 80'	Report	Hooper 40'; Wanyama (yellow card) 43'; Mulgrew (yellow card) 49'	Stadium: Fir Park; Attendance: 7,503; Referee: Euan Norris

4 May 2013 36	Inverness Caledonian Thistle	4–3	Motherwell	Inverness
15:00 BST (UTC+1)	Foran (yellow card) 5'; McKay 3', 27', 84'; Shinnie 25'; Draper (yellow card) 58'	Report	McFadden 36', 64'; Hammell (yellow card) 41'; Ojamaa (yellow card) 50' (yellow-red card) 73'; Law (yellow card) 57'; Higdon 49' (pen.)	Stadium: Caledonian Stadium; Attendance: 3,857; Referee: Willie Collum

12 May 2013 37	Motherwell	2–0	Ross County	Motherwell
15:00 BST (UTC+1)	McFadden 8'; Humphrey 45'	Report	Brittain (yellow card) 22'; Fotheringham (yellow card) 90'	Stadium: Fir Park; Attendance: 7,734; Referee: Craig Thomson

19 May 2013 38	St Johnstone	2–0	Motherwell	Perth
12:45 BST (UTC+1)	Craig (yellow card) 32' (goal) 36'; Hasselbaink 47'; Davidson (yellow card) 67'	Report		Stadium: McDiarmid Park; Attendance: 5,025; Referee: Euan McLean

=== Scottish Cup ===
1 December 2012 Fourth round	Aberdeen	1–1	Motherwell	Aberdeen
15:00 GMT (UTC)	Shaughnessy (yellow card) 17'; McGinn 89'	Report	Murphy 80'	Stadium: Pittodrie Stadium; Attendance: 6,061; Referee: Willie Collum

11 December 2012 Fourth round replay	Motherwell	1–2	Aberdeen	Motherwell
15:45 GMT (UTC)	Higdon 90' (pen.)	Report	Fallon 51'; Shaughnessy 61'	Stadium: Fir Park; Attendance: 4,516; Referee: Willie Collum

=== Scottish League Cup ===
26 September 2012 Third round	Rangers	2–0	Motherwell	Glasgow
19:15 BST (UTC+1)	McCulloch 50' (yellow card) 73'; Shiels 56'	Report	Hammell (yellow card) 14'; Daley (yellow card) 90+3'	Stadium: Ibrox Stadium; Attendance: 29,413; Referee: Calum Murray

=== Champions League ===
31 July 2012 Third qualifying round 1st leg	Motherwell (Scotland)	0–2	(Greece) Panathinaikos	Motherwell, Scotland
19:45 BST (UTC+1)		Report	Christodoulopoulos 14'; Zeca (yellow card) 74'; Mavrias 75'	Stadium: Fir Park; Attendance: 9,035; Referee: Pol van Boekel (Netherlands)

8 August 2012 Third qualifying round 2nd leg	Panathinaikos (Greece)	3–0 (5–0 agg.)	(Scotland) Motherwell	Athens, Greece
19:45 BST (UTC+1)	Christodoulopoulos 51'; Mavrias 75'; Sissoko 83'	Report	Hutchinson (yellow card) 65'; Cummins (yellow card) 75'	Stadium: Olympic Stadium; Attendance: 18,391; Referee: Stephan Studer (Switzerland)

=== Europa League ===
23 August 2012 Play-off round 1st leg	Motherwell (Scotland)	0–2	(Spain) Levante	Motherwell, Scotland
19:45 BST (UTC+1)	Lasley (yellow card) 25'; Hutchinson (red card) 77'; Hateley (yellow card) 80'	Report	Míchel (yellow card) 34'; Juanlu 42'; El Zhar (yellow card) 52' (goal) 62'; Iborra (yellow card) 72'	Stadium: Fir Park; Attendance: 6,286; Referee: Antti Munukka (Finland)

30 August 2012 Play-off round 2nd leg	Levante (Spain)	1–0 (3–0 agg.)	(Scotland) Motherwell	Valencia, Spain
19:45 BST (UTC+1)	Gekas 72'	Report	Hetherington (yellow card) 46'	Stadium: Estadi Ciutat de València; Attendance: 13,398; Referee: Clément Turpin (France)

== Squad statistics ==
=== Appearances ===
As of match played 19 May 2013

No.	Pos	Nat	Player	Total		Premier League		Scottish Cup		League Cup		UEFA Champions League		UEFA Europa League	
No.	Pos	Nat	Player	Apps	Goals	Apps	Goals	Apps	Goals	Apps	Goals	Apps	Goals	Apps	Goals
1	GK	(Republic of Ireland) IRL	Darren Randolph	42	0	36	0	1	0	1	0	2	0	2	0
2	DF	(Scotland) SCO	Steven Saunders	1	0	0+1	0	0	0	0	0	0	0	0	0
3	DF	(Scotland) SCO	Steven Hammell	39	0	32	0	2	0	1	0	2	0	2	0
4	MF	(England) ENG	Nicky Law	43	6	38	6	1	0	1	0	2	0	1	0
5	DF	(England) ENG	Shaun Hutchinson	36	1	31	1	1	0	1	0	2	0	1	0
6	MF	(England) ENG	Tom Hateley	40	3	34	3	2	0	1	0	2	0	1	0
7	MF	(Jamaica) JAM	Chris Humphrey	39	3	32+1	3	2	0	1	0	1	0	1+1	0
8	FW	(Estonia) EST	Henrik Ojamaa	44	4	32+5	4	2	0	1	0	2	0	2	0
9	FW	(England) ENG	Michael Higdon	44	27	37	26	2	1	1	0	1+1	0	2	0
11	FW	(England) ENG	Kallum Higginbotham	10	1	3+7	1	0	0	0	0	0	0	0	0
12	GK	(Scotland) SCO	Lee Hollis	4	0	2+1	0	1	0	0	0	0	0	0	0
14	MF	(Scotland) SCO	Keith Lasley	43	1	36	1	2	0	1	0	2	0	2	0
15	DF	(England) ENG	Simon Ramsden	31	0	28+1	0	0	0	0	0	2	0	0	0
16	FW	(Scotland) SCO	Bob McHugh	29	3	2+23	3	0+1	0	0	0	0+1	0	0+2	0
17	MF	(Jamaica) JAM	Omar Daley	17	1	2+12	1	0	0	0+1	0	1+1	0	0	0
18	MF	(Scotland) SCO	Stuart Carswell	26	0	7+16	0	1	0	0	0	0	0	1+1	0
19	DF	(Scotland) SCO	Fraser Kerr	20	0	9+6	0	1+1	0	1	0	0	0	1+1	0
20	FW	(Scotland) SCO	James McFadden	13	5	11+2	5	0	0	0	0	0	0	0	0
26	DF	(Antigua and Barbuda) ANT	Zaine Francis-Angol	25	0	7+14	0	0+1	0	0+1	0	0+1	0	0+1	0
27	MF	(England) ENG	Steven Hetherington	4	0	1+2	0	0	0	0	0	0	0	1	0
30	DF	(England) ENG	Adam Cummins	28	1	17+5	1	2	0	1	0	1	0	2	0
43	GK	(Scotland) SCO	Ross Stewart	1	0	0+1	0	0	0	0	0	0	0	0	0
Players away from the club on loan:
Players who left Motherwell during the season:
11	FW	(Scotland) SCO	Jamie Murphy	29	11	20+2	10	2	1	0+1	0	2	0	2	0
20	DF	(England) ENG	Jonathan Page	2	0	1	0	0	0	0	0	0	0	1	0

=== Goal scorers ===
As of match played 19 May 2013

Ranking	Nation	Position	Number	Name	Premier League	Scottish Cup	League Cup	UEFA Champions League	UEFA Europa League	Total
1	FW	(England)	9	Michael Higdon	26	1	0	0	0	27
2	FW	(Scotland)	11	Jamie Murphy	10	1	0	0	0	11
3	MF	(England)	4	Nicky Law	6	0	0	0	0	6
4	FW	(Scotland)	20	James McFadden	5	0	0	0	0	5
5	FW	(Estonia)	8	Henrik Ojamaa	4	0	0	0	0	4
6	DF	(England)	6	Tom Hateley	3	0	0	0	0	3
6	MF	(Jamaica)	7	Chris Humphrey	3	0	0	0	0	3
6	FW	(Scotland)	16	Bob McHugh	3	0	0	0	0	3
9				Own goal	2	0	0	0	0	2
10	DF	(England)	30	Adam Cummins	1	0	0	0	0	1
10	MF	(Jamaica)	17	Omar Daley	1	0	0	0	0	1
10	FW	(England)	11	Kallum Higginbotham	1	0	0	0	0	1
10	DF	(England)	5	Shaun Hutchinson	1	0	0	0	0	1
10	MF	(Scotland)	14	Keith Lasley	1	0	0	0	0	1
TOTALS					67	2	0	0	0	69

=== Clean sheets ===
As of match played 19 May 2013

Ranking	Nation	Position	Number	Name	Premier League	Scottish Cup	League Cup	UEFA Champions League	UEFA Europa League	Total
1	GK	(Republic of Ireland)	1	Darren Randolph	6	0	0	0	0	6
2	GK	(Scotland)	12	Lee Hollis	1	0	0	0	0	1
TOTALS					7	0	0	0	0	7

=== Disciplinary record ===
As of match played 19 May 2013

Number	Nation	Position	Name	Premier League		Scottish Cup		League Cup		UEFA Champions League		UEFA Europa League		Total	
Number	Nation	Position	Name	Yellow card	Red card	Yellow card	Red card	Yellow card	Red card	Yellow card	Red card	Yellow card	Red card	Yellow card	Red card
1	(Republic of Ireland)	GK	Darren Randolph	1	0	0	0	0	0	0	0	0	0	1	0
3	(Scotland)	DF	Steven Hammell	4	1	0	0	1	0	0	0	0	0	5	1
4	(England)	MF	Nicky Law	2	0	0	0	0	0	0	0	0	0	2	0
5	(England)	DF	Shaun Hutchinson	9	1	0	0	0	0	1	0	0	1	10	2
6	(England)	DF	Tom Hateley	3	0	0	0	0	0	0	0	1	0	4	0
7	(Jamaica)	MF	Chris Humphrey	1	0	0	0	0	0	0	0	0	0	1	0
8	(Estonia)	FW	Henrik Ojamaa	6	1	0	0	0	0	0	0	0	0	6	1
9	(England)	FW	Michael Higdon	3	0	0	0	0	0	0	0	0	0	3	0
14	(Scotland)	MF	Keith Lasley	4	1	0	0	0	0	0	0	1	0	5	1
15	(England)	DF	Simon Ramsden	3	0	0	0	0	0	0	0	0	0	3	0
17	(Jamaica)	MF	Omar Daley	2	0	0	0	1	0	0	0	0	0	3	0
19	(Scotland)	DF	Fraser Kerr	1	1	0	0	0	0	0	0	0	0	1	1
20	(Scotland)	FW	James McFadden	1	0	0	0	0	0	0	0	0	0	1	0
27	(England)	MF	Steven Hetherington	1	0	0	0	0	0	0	0	1	0	2	0
30	(England)	DF	Adam Cummins	2	1	0	0	0	0	1	0	0	0	3	1
Players away from the club on loan::
Players who left Motherwell during the season:
20	(England)	DF	Jonathan Page	1	0	0	0	0	0	0	0	0	0	1	0
			TOTALS	44	6	0	0	2	0	2	0	3	1	0	0

=== Awards ===
==== Manager of the Month ====
MONTH	Name	Award
March	(Scotland) Stuart McCall	Won

==== Player of the Month ====
MONTH	Name	Award
September	(England) Michael Higdon	Won
December	(Scotland) Jamie Murphy	Won
March	(England) Nicky Law	Won
April	(England) Michael Higdon	Won

==== Young player of the Month ====
MONTH	Name	Award
April	(Estonia) Henrik Ojamaa	Won

==== SPL Manager of the Year ====
(Scotland) Stuart McCall

==== Player of the Year ====
(England) Michael Higdon
