= Josh Watt =

Scottish footballer

Personal information
- Date of birth: 31 August 1993 (age 33)
- Place of birth: Scotland
- Position: Winger

Team information
- Current team: Queen's Park

Youth career
- 2002–2011: Motherwell

Senior career*
Years	Team	Apps	(Gls)
2011–2013	Motherwell	0	(0)
2012–2013	→ Airdrie United (loan)	11	(1)
2013	→ Raith Rovers (loan)	6	(0)
2013	ÍA	1	(0)
2013–2015	Stenhousemuir	37	(3)
2014	→ East Stirlingshire (loan)	5	(0)
2015–2016	Cumnock Juniors		
2016–2017	Queen's Park	6	(1)
- * Club domestic league appearances and goals as of 29 October 2016

Joshua Watt (born 31 August 1993) is a Scottish footballer who plays for Queen's Park. He plays as a right-sided winger.

== Career ==
Watt is a product of the Motherwell youth system. His good performances for the Under-19 side were enough to earn him a new contract with the club.

On 17 October 2012, with first-team opportunities limited, Watt joined Lanarkshire derby rivals Airdrie United on a three-month loan. He made his debut in a club-record 7–0 defeat against Partick Thistle.

On 5 March 2013, he joined Raith Rovers on loan. On 20 May 2013, Watt's contract was not extended by Motherwell.

On 24 July 2013, Watt moved to Icelandic football and joined Íþróttabandalag Akraness.

On 3 October 2013, Watt signed for Scottish League One side Stenhousemuir. On 10 January 2014, he moved to East Stirlingshire on a one-month loan deal.

== Career statistics ==
As of 4 May 2014

Club	Season	League			Cup		League Cup		Other		Total
Club	Season	Apps	Goals	Apps	Goals	Apps	Goals	Apps	Goals	Apps	Goals
Motherwell	2012–13	0	0	0	0	0	0	0	0	0	0
Airdrie United (loan)	2012–13	11	1	2	1	0	0	0	0	13	2
Raith Rovers (loan)	2012–13	6	0	0	0	0	0	0	0	6	0
ÍA	2013	1	0	0	0	0	0	0	0	1	0
Stenhousemuir	2013–14	11	1	2	0	0	0	0	0	13	1
East Stirlingshire (loan)	2013–14	5	0	0	0	0	0	0	0	5	0
Career total		19	1	2	1	0	0	0	0	21	2
