= Steven Hetherington =

English footballer (born 1993)

Personal information
- Date of birth: 9 March 1993 (age 33)
- Place of birth: Hartlepool, England
- Height: 5 ft 11 in (1.80 m)
- Position: Midfielder

Team information
- Current team: Alloa Athletic
- Number: 4

Youth career
- –2009: Hartlepool United
- 2009–2011: Rangers

Senior career*
Years	Team	Apps	(Gls)
2011–2013	Motherwell	4	(0)
2013	→ Airdrie United (loan)	14	(0)
2013	Celtic Nation	0	(0)
2013–2014	Crook Town		
2014–2021	Alloa Athletic	128	(5)
2021–2023	Falkirk	39	(0)
2023	→ Arbroath (loan)	13	(0)
2023–	Alloa Athletic	69	(0)
- * Club domestic league appearances and goals as of 4 May 2026

Steven Hetherington (born 9 March 1993) is an English professional footballer who plays as a midfielder for Alloa Athletic.

He has spent the majority of his career in Scotland and has previously played for Motherwell, Airdrie United, Arbroath and Falkirk. He has also played for English non-league sides Celtic Nation and Crook Town.

== Career ==
Hetherington started his football career at local club Hartlepool United, and was at Victoria Park up until July 2009, when SPL club Rangers signed him. He was immediately drafted into the under-19 team.

His chances at Ibrox were limited, and he was released by the club in July 2011, after not making a single first team appearance. He was then given a trial at fellow SPL club Motherwell, and did enough to earn a short-term contract at the Fir Park club. Despite not making a first team appearance in the 2011–12 season, Hetherington's good performances for the Under 19 team earned him a contract extension with the club.

After several former youth players were released by Motherwell, his chances of a first team appearance increased. Indeed, on 11 August 2012, he made his competitive first-team debut as a substitute for Keith Lasley in a 1–1 draw with St. Johnstone.

On 7 February 2013, after making just four appearances for Motherwell in the 2012–13 season, Hetherington went on a months loan to Lanarkshire derby rivals Airdrie United. That loan was then extended till the end of the season.

On 20 May 2013, Hetherington left Motherwell after failing to earn a contract extension with the Fir Park club.

After an unsuccessful trial with Crystal Palace, Steven had brief spells at English non-league clubs Celtic Nation and Crook Town before signing for Scottish Championship club Alloa Athletic on 30 July 2014.

Hetherington made the switch back to full-time football when he signed for Falkirk in June 2021. He was appointed club captain two months later.

On 15 June 2023, it was announced Hetherington has signed for his former club Alloa.

== Career statistics ==
As of match played 18 January 2020

Appearances and goals by club, season and competition
Club	Season	League			Scottish Cup		League Cup		Other		Total	
Club	Season	Division	Apps	Goals	Apps	Goals	Apps	Goals	Apps	Goals	Apps	Goals
Motherwell	2012–13	Scottish Premier League	3	0	0	0	0	0	1 (Note: Appearance in the Europa League)	0	4	0
Airdrie United (loan)	2012–13	Scottish First Division	14	0	0	0	0	0	0	0	14	0
Alloa Athletic	2014–15	Scottish Championship	7	0	1	0	1	0	5 (Note: Two appearances in the Scottish Challenge Cup and three in the Championship play-offs)	0	14	0
Alloa Athletic	2015–16	Scottish Championship	18	1	1	0	0	0	0	0	19	1
Alloa Athletic	2016–17	Scottish League One	21	0	1	0	1	0	3 (Note: Three appearances in the Championship play-offs)	0	26	0
Alloa Athletic	2017–18	Scottish League One	32	3	2	0	4	0	3 (Note: Two appearances in the Scottish Challenge Cup and one appearance in the Championship play-offs)	0	41	3
Alloa Athletic	2018–19	Scottish Championship	33	1	2	0	2	0	2 (Note: Appearances in the Scottish Challenge Cup)	0	39	1
Alloa Athletic	2019–20	Scottish Championship	17	0	1	0	3	0	1	0	22	0
Alloa Athletic	Total		128	5	8	0	11	0	14	0	161	5
Career total			145	5	8	0	11	0	15	0	179	5
