= Gavin Griffin (footballer) =

Scottish footballer

Personal information
- Date of birth: 17 September 1993 (age 33)
- Place of birth: Bellshill, North Lanarkshire, Scotland
- Position: Defender

Team information
- Current team: Airdrie United

Youth career
- 200?–2011: Motherwell

Senior career*
Years	Team	Apps	(Gls)
2011–2012	Partick Thistle	2	(0)
2012–2013	Airdrie United	15	(1)
- * Club domestic league appearances and goals as of 20 July 2012

Gavin Griffin (born 17 September 1993) is a Scottish footballer who plays as a defender.

== Career ==
=== Motherwell Football Club ===
Griffin came through the youth system at Motherwell, he would spend much of his childhood at the club before going full time at the age of 16. Griffin, the nephew of 91 Scottish Cup winning legend Jim, left the club to Join Partick Thistle at the age of 18. His career was cut short sadly after being blighted by injuries. He quit football as his profession in 2013.

=== Partick Thistle ===
Griffin joined Scottish First Division side Partick Thistle in June 2011 joining up with their under 19 squad after being released by Motherwell. He made his first team debut as a substitute against Livingston on 11 February 2012. In all he made two appearances for the club, and was released at the end of the season.

=== Airdrie ===
On 20 July 2012, Griffin joined Scottish First Division newcomers Airdrie United. He left the club in May 2013.

== Career statistics ==
As of 13 February 2012

Appearances and goals by club, season and competition
Club	Season	League		Scottish Cup		League Cup		Other		Total	
Club	Season	Apps	Goals	Apps	Goals	Apps	Goals	Apps	Goals	Apps	Goals
Partick Thistle	2011–12	2	0	0	0	0	0	0	0	2	0
Airdrie United	2012–13	0	0	0	0	0	0	0	0	0	0
Total		2	0	0	0	0	0	0	0	2	0
