= Liam Watt =

Scottish footballer

Personal information
- Date of birth: 21 January 1994 (age 32)
- Position: Midfielder

Team information
- Current team: East Kilbride

Senior career*
Years	Team	Apps	(Gls)
2012–2016	Airdrieonians	83	(11)
2016	→ Brechin City (loan)	10	(4)
2016–2017	Livingston	11	(0)
2017–2018	Brechin City	46	(1)
2018–2022	East Fife	87	(8)
2022–	East Kilbride	0	(0)
- * Club domestic league appearances and goals as of 11:30, 2 February 2022 (UTC)

Liam Watt (born 21 January 1994) is a Scottish professional footballer, who plays as a midfielder for East Kilbride.

== Youth career ==
He played for East Calder C.F.C. as a child before turning professional.

== Professional career ==
Watt has previously played for Airdrieonians, Livingston, Brechin City, and East Fife.

== Career statistics ==
As of match played 2 January 2018

Appearances and goals by club, season and competition
Club	Season	League			Scottish Cup		League Cup		Other		Total	
Club	Season	Division	Apps	Goals	Apps	Goals	Apps	Goals	Apps	Goals	Apps	Goals
Airdrie United	2012–13	Scottish First Division	5	1	0	0	0	0	0	0	5	1
Airdrieonians	2013–14	Scottish League One	25	2	1	0	0	0	0	0	26	2
Airdrieonians	2014–15	Scottish League One	28	1	2	0	1	0	1 (Note: Appearances in the Scottish Challenge Cup)	1	32	2
Airdrieonians	2015–16	Scottish League One	25	7	2	0	2	0	1	0	30	7
Airdrieonians	Total		83	11	5	0	3	0	2	1	93	12
Brechin City (loan)	2015–16	Scottish League One	10	4	—		—		—		10	4
Livingston	2016–17	Scottish League One	11	0	0	0	2	0	2	0	15	0
Brechin City	2016–17	Scottish League One	17	1	0	0	—		4 (Note: Appearances in the Championship play-offs)	2	21	3
Brechin City	2017–18	Scottish Championship	17	0	1	0	0	0	1	0	19	0
Brechin City	Total		34	1	1	0	0	0	5	2	40	3
Career total			140	16	6	0	5	0	9	3	158	19
