= Gary Fisher (footballer) =

Scottish footballer

Personal information
- Date of birth: 6 June 1992 (age 34)
- Place of birth: Scotland
- Height: 5 ft 11 in (1.80 m)
- Position: Midfielder

Senior career*
Years	Team	Apps	(Gls)
2011–2014	Kilmarnock	10	(0)
2012	→ Cowdenbeath (loan)	10	(0)
2012–2013	→ Hamilton Academical (loan)	28	(1)
2013–2014	→ East Fife (loan)	6	(1)
2014	East Fife	7	(0)
2014–2019	Albion Rovers	138	(8)
- * Club domestic league appearances and goals as of 14:18, 25 August 2020 (UTC)

Gary Fisher (born 6 June 1992) is a Scottish professional footballer who plays as a midfielder.

== Career ==
Fisher made his senior debut for Kilmarnock during the 2010–11 season, and spent a loan spell at Cowdenbeath. Fisher would sign a long-term contract, which kept him until 2015. He joined Hamilton Academical on loan in August 2012; the loan deal was extended in January 2013. Following a win at home against league leaders Morton, Fisher commented that he thought the victory would act as a "springboard" for the club in the latter stages of the season. At the end of the 2012–13 season, Fisher returned to the club.

In 2013–14 season, Fisher joined East Fife on an emergency one-month loan deal. Fisher soon made an immediate impact by scoring on his debut, in a 1–0 win over Stenhousemuir. After making a few appearances at East Fife, Kilmarnock released five players, including Fisher. Following his release, Fisher joined East Fife on a free transfer.

Fisher signed for Albion Rovers in June 2014. Fisher left Rovers in 2019.

== Career statistics ==
As of 14 April 2018

Appearances and goals by club, season and competition
Club	Season	League		FA Cup		League Cup		Other		Total	
Club	Season	Apps	Goals	Apps	Goals	Apps	Goals	Apps	Goals	Apps	Goals
Kilmarnock	2010–11	3	0	0	0	0	0	0	0	3	0
Kilmarnock	2011–12	6	0	0	0	1	0	0	0	7	0
Kilmarnock	2012–13	0	0	0	0	0	0	0	0	0	0
Kilmarnock	2013–14	1	0	0	0	0	0	0	0	1	0
Kilmarnock	Total	10	0	0	0	1	0	0	0	11	0
Cowdenbeath (loan)	2011–12	10	0	0	0	0	0	0	0	10	0
Hamilton Academical (loan)	2012–13	28	1	2	0	2	0	0	0	32	1
East Fife	2012–13	13	1	0	0	0	0	0	0	13	1
Albion Rovers	2014–15	29	3	2	0	0	0	2	0	33	3
Albion Rovers	2015–16	33	1	1	0	1	0	1	0	36	1
Albion Rovers	2016–17	32	0	2	0	4	0	2	0	40	0
Albion Rovers	2017–18	29	4	2	1	4	1	1	0	36	6
Albion Rovers	Total	123	8	7	1	9	1	6	0	145	10
Career total		184	10	9	1	12	1	6	0	211	12

== Personal life ==
Fisher and his family support Celtic.
