= Jonathan Page (footballer) =

English footballer (born 1990)

Personal information
- Full name: Jonathan Edward Page
- Date of birth: 8 February 1990 (age 36)
- Place of birth: Portsmouth, England
- Position: Defender

Team information
- Current team: Broxburn Athletic

Youth career
- 1998–2004: Southampton
- 2004–2008: Portsmouth

Senior career*
Years	Team	Apps	(Gls)
2008–2012	Motherwell	14	(0)
2010	→ Stirling Albion (loan)	16	(2)
2012	→ Hamilton Academical (loan)	11	(3)
2013	Hamilton Academical	11	(0)
2013–2014	Greenock Morton	12	(0)
2014–2015	Dunfermline Athletic	16	(0)
2014	→ East Fife (loan)	11	(1)
2014–2015	→ East Fife (loan)	17	(2)
2015–2018	East Fife	92	(6)
2018–2019	Airdrieonians	14	(0)
2019–2021	Brechin City	33	(0)
2021–2022	Clyde	19	(0)
2022–2023	East Kilbride	19	(1)
2023-2024	East Fife	22	(3)
2024-	Broxburn Athletic		
- * Club domestic league appearances and goals as of 25 February 2024

Jonathan Edward Page (born 8 February 1990) is an English professional footballer who plays as a defender for Broxburn Athletic.

== Career ==
Having started his career in the youth sides at Southampton and then Portsmouth, Page signed for Motherwell in 2008. He made his debut for Motherwell in a Europa League first qualifying round match against Llanelli on 9 July 2009. He also featured in the next round, against Flamurtari.

In February 2009, Page signed on loan for Stirling Albion until the end of the 2009–10 season. He scored his first senior goals scoring twice against East Fife in a 3–0 win for Stirling. The loan was to prove beneficial, as Page helped The Binos to the Second Division title, earning promotion to the First Division.

On his return to Motherwell, Page signed a one-year contract extension, until 2012. He scored his first goal for Motherwell in a Europa League third qualifying round second-leg match against Aalesunds of Norway, the third goal for The Steelmen in a 3–0 win. He then followed that up with a double in a 2–0 win over Brechin City in the League Cup on 21 September 2010.

On 27 September 2012, with first-team opportunities limited, Page went on a one-month loan to Lanarkshire derby rivals Hamilton Academical. That was later extended by a further month, and extended further until 27 December 2012.

On 31 December 2012, Motherwell announced that Page would be released from his contract six-months early, making him free to sign for another club. Two days later, Page signed a permanent deal with Hamilton Academical until the end of the season.

On 18 June 2013, Page signed for Morton. On 23 January 2014, he left Morton by mutual consent.

After leaving Morton, Page signed for Scottish League One club Dunfermline Athletic on 24 January 2014. He made his debut for Dunfermline in the 3–1 victory over Fife rivals East Fife on 1 February 2014

On 11 September 2014, Page signed for Scottish League Two club East Fife on a three-month loan. After the loan ended in December, Page returned to Dunfermline and featured in the loss against Airdrieonians. The following month he returned on loan to Bayview Stadium for the remainder of the season. After just one season with The Pars, Page was released by the club.

After leaving Dunfermline, Page signed a permanent deal with East Fife.

Page spent three seasons with the Methil side before joining Airdrieonians in June 2018. At the end of the 2018–19 season, he was made available for transfer by Airdrieonians.

After spending time training with Peterhead, Page signed for Brechin City on 13 August 2019.

Page then moved to Clyde in June 2021. On 3 May 2022, Page was one of ten players released by the club at the end of the 2021–22 season.

After Clyde, Page moved to East Kilbride for a season and then returned to former club East Fife in January 2023.

Page signed for Broxburn Athletic in August 2024.

== Career statistics ==
As of 15 September 2019

Appearances and goals by club, season and competition
Club	Season	League			Cup		League Cup		Other		Total	
Club	Season	Division	Apps	Goals	Apps	Goals	Apps	Goals	Apps	Goals	Apps	Goals
Motherwell	2009–10	Scottish Premier League	0	0	0	0	0	0	3 (Note: Appearances in the Europa League)	0	3	0
Motherwell	2010–11	Scottish Premier League	9	0	1	0	2	2	1	1	13	3
Motherwell	2011–12	Scottish Premier League	4	0	3	0	1	0	0	0	8	0
Motherwell	2012–13	Scottish Premier League	1	0	0	0	0	0	1	0	2	0
Motherwell	Total		14	0	4	0	3	2	5	1	26	3
Stirling Albion (loan)	2009–10	Scottish Second Division	16	2	0	0	0	0	0	0	16	2
Hamilton Academical (loan)	2012–13	Scottish First Division	11	3	0	0	0	0	0	0	11	3
Hamilton Academical	2012–13	Scottish First Division	11	0	2	0	0	0	0	0	13	0
Greenock Morton	2013–14	Scottish Championship	12	0	0	0	3	0	0	0	15	0
Dunfermline Athletic	2013–14	Scottish League One	13	0	0	0	0	0	1 (Note: Appearance in the Championship play-offs)	0	14	0
Dunfermline Athletic	2014–15	Scottish League One	3	0	0	0	0	0	1 (Note: Appearances in the Scottish Challenge Cup)	0	4	0
Dunfermline Athletic	Total		16	0	0	0	0	0	2	0	18	0
East Fife (loan)	2014–15	Scottish League Two	11	1	0	0	0	0	0	0	11	1
East Fife (loan)	2014–15	Scottish League Two	17	2	0	0	0	0	2 (Note: Appearances in the League One play-offs)	1	19	3
East Fife	2015–16	Scottish League Two	36	5	2	0	2	0	1	0	41	5
East Fife	2016–17	Scottish League One	27	0	4	0	4	1	2	1	37	2
East Fife	2017–18	Scottish League One	29	1	2	1	0	0	0	0	31	2
East Fife	Total		92	6	8	1	6	1	3	1	109	9
Airdrieonians	2018–19	Scottish League One	14	0	1	0	3	0	2	0	20	0
Airdrieonians	2019–20	Scottish League One	0	0	0	0	0	0	0	0	0	0
Airdrieonians	Total		14	0	1	0	3	0	2	0	20	0
Brechin City	2019–20	Scottish League Two	3	0	0	0	0	0	1	1	4	1
Career total			217	14	15	1	15	3	15	4	262	22

== Honours ==
=== Club ===
Stirling Albion

- Scottish Second Division: 2009–10

East Fife

- Scottish League Two: 2015–16

=== Individual ===
- Scottish League One Player of the Month: December 2016
- PFA Scotland Scottish League Two Team of the Year: 2015–16
- PFA Scotland Scottish League One Team of the Year: 2016–17
