= Jordan Moore =

Scottish footballer (born 1994)

Personal information
- Date of birth: 19 February 1994 (age 32)
- Place of birth: Glasgow, Scotland
- Position: Forward

Youth career
- 2007–2012: Dundee United

Senior career*
Years	Team	Apps	(Gls)
2012–2015	Dundee United	0	(0)
2013	→ Airdrie United (loan)	9	(2)
2013–2014	→ Dunfermline Athletic (loan)	16	(5)
2015	→ Queen's Park (loan)	8	(3)
2016	Limerick	1	(0)
2016–2017	Kelty Hearts		
- * Club domestic league appearances and goals

Jordan Moore (born 19 February 1994) is a Scottish former professional footballer.

He began his career with Dundee United, and had loan spells with Airdrieonians and Dunfermline Athletic. After overcoming skin cancer in 2014, Moore returned to football on loan at Queen's Park. He left Dundee United in 2015 and played for Irish club Limerick, before leaving full-time football in 2016 to focus on cancer awareness campaigning. Moore played for Kelty Hearts in the East of Scotland Football League after going part-time.

== Playing career ==
Moore was born in Glasgow and joined Dundee United at under-14 level. He was loaned to Scottish First Division side Airdrie United in February 2013 and scored on his debut from the penalty spot against Hamilton Academical in a 2–2 draw. He went on to make a total of nine appearances for Airdrie, scoring once more in a defeat away to Cowdenbeath before returning to Dundee United at the end of the season.

Moore was once again loaned out for the 2013–14 season, this time to Scottish League One side Dunfermline Athletic where he was joined by fellow Dundee United players Ryan Ferguson and Luke Johnston. He made his debut for the club in a Scottish League Cup match on 3 August as a substitute for Ryan Wallace in the final three minutes of a 2–0 away win. Three weeks later he was given his first start for the club and scored twice as Dunfermline beat Stenhousemuir 5–4 away. He netted another brace on 2 November, in a 5–3 win at Elgin City, with two goals in a minute, the first a penalty which he won himself when fouled by David Niven. Four days later however, he was sent off for two bookings in a 1–3 defeat to Rangers at Ibrox, the second coming for conceding a penalty with a foul on Lee McCulloch, who converted the spot-kick.

On 2 February 2015, Moore went on loan to Scottish League Two club Queen's Park until the end of the season. Six days after signing, he made his debut in a 4–1 win over Montrose, scoring two late goals, one from the penalty spot. He played seven more matches for the Glaswegian club, scoring once more, a last-minute winner as a substitute away to Elgin City on 14 March.

On 23 December 2015, Moore left Dundee United by mutual agreement. He then had a brief spell with League of Ireland side Limerick before announcing his retirement from football in August 2016, but made his comeback to the game in at the end of the same month, joining Junior side Kelty Hearts.

== Cancer and recovery ==
In April 2014, Moore revealed he had been receiving treatment for skin cancer. His teammates at Dundee United and Dunfermline wore T-shirts in support. In late May he then announced that his cancer had gone and he would soon return to playing football once his surgical wounds had healed.

Moore received support from Hibernian manager and testicular cancer survivor Alan Stubbs during his illness. He returned to football despite being told that there was only a 1% of chance of him playing the sport again. Moore was given a Special Merit Award at the PFA Scotland awards in May 2015.

== Career statistics ==
As of 2 February 2015

Club	Season	League			Cup		League Cup		Other		Total	
Club	Season	Division	Apps	Goals	Apps	Goals	Apps	Goals	Apps	Goals	Apps	Goals
Dundee United	2012–13	Scottish Premier League	0	0	0	0	0	0	0	0	0	0
Dundee United	2013–14	Scottish Premiership	0	0	0	0	0	0	0	0	0	0
Dundee United	2014–15	Scottish Premiership	0	0	0	0	0	0	0	0	0	0
Dundee United	Total		0	0	0	0	0	0	0	0	0	0
Airdrie United (loan)	2012–13	First Division	9	2	0	0	0	0	0	0	9	2
Dunfermline Athletic (loan)	2013–14	Scottish League One	16	5	2	2	2	1	1	0	21	8
Queen's Park (loan)	2014–15	Scottish League Two	1	2	0	0	0	0	0	0	1	2
Career total			26	9	2	2	2	1	1	0	31	12

== Honours ==
Individual

- PFA Scotland Special Merit Award: 2015
