= 2008–09 Motherwell F.C. season =

Motherwell
2008–09 season
- Chairman: John Boyle
- Manager: Mark McGhee
- Premier League: 7th
- Scottish Cup: Fifth Round
- League Cup: Third Round
- UEFA Cup: First Round
- Top goalscorer: David Clarkson (13)
- Highest home attendance: 11,318 vs Nancy (2 October 2008)
- Lowest home attendance: 2,818 vs Inverness (13 May 2009)
- Average home league attendance: 5,351
Home colours	Away colours

The 2008–09 season was Motherwell's 11th season in the Scottish Premier League, and their 24th consecutive season in the top division of Scottish football. As well as the SPL, the club competed in the Scottish Cup, Scottish League Cup, and the UEFA Cup for the first time in 13 years.

== Season review ==
On 10 July, Bob Malcolm signed a new one-year contract with the club.

On 8 August, Motherwell announced the signing of Jim O'Brien to a two-year contract from Celtic, and the six-month loan signing of Gunnar Nielsen from Blackburn Rovers.

On 19 August, Motherwell signed John Sutton to a three-year contract from Wycombe Wanderers.

On 1 September, Motherwell signed Maroš Klimpl on loan from Midtjylland for five-months.

On 2 January, Artur Krysiak joined Motherwell on loan from Birmingham City until the end of the season, whilst Maroš Klimpl extended his loan stay from Midtjylland until the summer.

On 19 January, Motherwell signed a pre-contract agreement with Michael Fraser, with the goalkeeper joining from Inverness Caledonian Thistle in the summer.

On 24 January, Ross Forbes joined Dumbarton for the remainder of the season.

On 2 February, Cillian Sheridan joined Motherwell on loan from Celtic for the remainder of the season, whilst Semih Aydilek joined from Birmingham City on a similar deal. The following day, 3 February, Chris Porter left the club, signing for Derby County for an undisclosed fee of around £400,000

On 12 June 2009, Mark McGhee left the club to become manager of Aberdeen with Assistant Scott Leitch and goalkeeping coach Colin Meldrum also leaving for the Pittodrie outfit.

== Squad ==
As of match played 23 May 2009

No.	Name	Nationality	Position	Date of birth (age)	Signed from	Signed in	Contract ends	Apps.	Goals
Goalkeepers
1	Graeme Smith	(Scotland)	GK	8 June 1983 (aged 25)	Rangers	2005		147	0
21	Artur Krysiak	(Poland)	GK	11 August 1989 (aged 19)	on loan from Birmingham City	2009	2009	1	0
Defenders
2	Paul Quinn	(Scotland)	DF	21 July 1985 (aged 23)	Academy	2002		184	5
3	Steven Hammell	(Scotland)	DF	18 February 1982 (aged 27)	Southend United	2008	2010	301	2
4	Mark Reynolds	(Scotland)	DF	7 May 1987 (aged 22)	Academy	2004	2010	128	2
5	Stephen Craigan (captain)	(Northern Ireland)	DF	29 October 1976 (aged 32)	Partick Thistle	2003		260	9
6	Brian McLean	(Northern Ireland)	DF	28 February 1985 (aged 24)	Rangers	2006	2009	61	6
37	Shaun Hutchinson	(England)	DF	23 November 1990 (aged 18)	Academy	2008		1	0
40	Jonathan Page	(England)	DF	8 February 1990 (aged 19)	Portsmouth	2008		3	0
43	Steven Saunders	(Scotland)	DF	30 March 1991 (aged 18)	Academy	2008		3	0
Midfielders
7	Stephen Hughes	(Scotland)	MF	14 November 1982 (aged 26)	Leicester City	2007	2009	75	3
17	Bob Malcolm	(Scotland)	MF	12 November 1980 (aged 28)	Unattached	2008	2009	24	2
12	Darren Smith	(Scotland)	MF	27 March 1988 (aged 21)	Academy	2004		71	8
13	Maroš Klimpl	(Slovakia)	MF	4 July 1980 (aged 28)	on loan from Midtjylland	2008	2009	24	1
14	Keith Lasley	(Scotland)	MF	21 September 1979 (aged 29)	Unattached	2006		197	12
16	Marc Fitzpatrick	(Scotland)	MF	11 May 1986 (aged 23)	Academy	2002	2010	132	5
17	Jim O'Brien	(Scotland)	MF	28 September 1987 (aged 21)	Celtic	2008	2010	28	1
18	Steven McGarry	(Scotland)	MF	28 September 1979 (aged 29)	Ross County	2006	2010	99	4
22	Semih Aydilek	(Germany)	MF	16 January 1989 (aged 20)	on loan from Birmingham City	2009	2009	0	0
45	Paul Slane	(Scotland)	MF	25 November 1991 (aged 17)	Academy	2007		1	0
Forwards
9	Cillian Sheridan	(Republic of Ireland)	FW	23 February 1989 (aged 20)	on loan from Celtic	2009	2009	15	2
12	David Clarkson	(Scotland)	FW	10 September 1985 (aged 23)	Academy	2002	2010	253	55
11	John Sutton	(England)	FW	26 December 1983 (aged 25)	Wycombe Wanderers	2008	2011	33	12
15	Jamie Murphy	(Scotland)	FW	28 August 1989 (aged 19)	Academy	2006		53	4
33	Mark Archdeacon	(Scotland)	FW	9 October 1989 (aged 19)	Academy	2007		0	0
35	Bob McHugh	(Scotland)	FW	16 July 1991 (aged 17)	Academy	2007		3	0
Away on loan
29	Ross Forbes	(Scotland)	MF	3 March 1989 (aged 20)	Academy	2008		0	0
Left during the season
9	Chris Porter	(England)	FW	12 December 1983 (aged 25)	Unattached	2007	2009	67	27
26	Kenny Connolly	(Scotland)	MF	4 April 1987 (aged 22)	Academy	2004		3	0
	Gunnar Nielsen	(Faroe Islands)	GK	7 October 1986 (aged 22)	on loan from Blackburn Rovers	2008	2008	0	0

== Transfers ==
=== In ===
Date	Position	Nationality	Name	From	Fee	Ref
August 2010	GK	(Poland)	Sebastian Kosiorowski	Korona Kielce		
8 August 2008	MF	(Scotland)	Jim O'Brien	Celtic	Undisclosed	
19 August 2008	FW	(England)	John Sutton	Wycombe Wanderers	Undisclosed	

=== Loans in ===
Date from	Position	Nationality	Name	From	Date to	Ref.
8 August 2008	GK	(Faroe Islands)	Gunnar Nielsen	Blackburn Rovers	30 December 2008	
1 September 2008	DF	(Slovakia)	Maroš Klimpl	Midtjylland	End of season	
2 January 2009	GK	(Poland)	Artur Krysiak	Birmingham City	End of season	
2 February 2009	FW	(Germany)	Semih Aydilek	Birmingham City	End of season	
2 February 2009	FW	(Republic of Ireland)	Cillian Sheridan	Celtic	End of season	

=== Out ===
Date	Position	Nationality	Name	To	Fee	Ref.
16 June 2008	FW	(Scotland)	Martin Grehan	Stirling Albion	Undisclosed	
3 February 2009	FW	(England)	Chris Porter	Derby County	Undisclosed	

=== Loans out ===
Date from	Position	Nationality	Name	To	Date to	Ref.
24 January 2009	MF	(Scotland)	Ross Forbes	Dumbarton	End of season	

=== Released ===
Date	Position	Nationality	Name	Joined	Date	Ref.
31 December 2008	MF	(Scotland)	Kenny Connolly	Ayr United	17 January 2009	
31 May 2009	GK	(Scotland)	Graeme Smith	Brighton	1 July 2009	
31 May 2009	DF	(Northern Ireland)	Brian McLean	Falkirk	1 July 2009	
31 May 2009	MF	(Scotland)	Stephen Hughes	Norwich City	22 July 2009	
31 May 2009	MF	(Scotland)	Bob Malcolm	Brisbane Roar	31 July 2009	

=== Trial ===
Date from	Position	Nationality	Name	Last club	Date to	Ref.
July 2008	GK	(England)	Lenny Pidgeley	Millwall		
August 2010	GK	(Poland)	Sebastian Kosiorowski	Korona Kielce		
January 2009	DF	(England)	Byron Webster	Baník Most		
January 2009	MF	(New Zealand)	Simon Elliott	Fulham		

== Competitions ==
=== Overview ===
Competition	First match	Last match	Starting round	Final position	Record							
Competition	First match	Last match	Starting round	Final position	Pld	W	D	L	GF	GA	GD	Win %
Premier League	9 August 2008	23 May 2009	Matchday 1	7th	38	13	9	16	46	51	−5	34.21
Scottish Cup	2 February 2009	19 February 2009	Fourth round	Fifth Round	3	1	1	1	4	2	+2	33.33
League Cup	24 September 2008	24 September 2008	Third round	Third round	1	0	0	1	1	2	−1	0.00
UEFA Cup	18 September 2008	2 October 2008	First round	First round	2	0	0	2	0	3	−3	0.00
Total					44	14	10	20	51	58	−7	31.82

Last updated: 23 May 2009
Source: Soccerway

=== Premier League ===
==== Table ====
Pos	Team	Pld	W	D	L	GF	GA	GD	Pts	Qualification or relegation (Note: Teams played each other three times (33 matches), before the league split into two groups (the top six and the bottom six) for the last five matches.)
5	Dundee United	38	13	14	11	47	50	−3	53	
6	Hibernian	38	11	14	13	42	46	−4	47	
7	Motherwell	38	13	9	16	46	51	−5	48	Qualification for the Europa League first qualifying round (Note: Scotland were awarded an additional Europa League place as the association finished in third place of the UEFA Fair Play ranking. Motherwell earned this place as winners of the Scottish Fair Play ranking.)
8	Kilmarnock	38	12	8	18	38	48	−10	44	
9	Hamilton Academical	38	12	5	21	30	53	−23	41	

Source: Scottish Professional Football League
Rules for classification: 1) Points; 2) Goal difference; 3) Goals scored

==== Results summary ====
Overall								Home						Away					
Pld	W	D	L	GF	GA	GD	Pts	W	D	L	GF	GA	GD	W	D	L	GF	GA	GD
38	13	9	16	46	51	−5	48	7	6	6	24	27	−3	6	3	10	22	24	−2

Source: BBC Sport

==== Results by round ====
Round	1	2	3	4	5	6	7	8	9	10	11	12	13	14	15	16	17	18	19	20	21	22	23	24	25	26	27	28	29	30	31	32	33	34	35	36	37	38
Ground	A	H	H	A	H	A	H	H	A	A	H	A	H	A	H	A	H	A	H	A	H	A	H	A	H	H	A	A	H	A	H	A	H	A	A	H	A	H
Result	L	L	D	W	L	L	W	W	L	W	W	L	D	L	L	L	L	L	W	D	W	W	D	D	W	D	W	L	D	D	L	L	L	L	W	D	W	L
Position	9	11	10	9	10	11	10	8	9	7	3	6	6	7	9	10	11	10	9	9	9	7	7	7	7	6	6	7	7	7	7	7	7	7	7	7	7	7

Source: BBC Sport
A = Away; H = Home; W = Win; D = Draw; L = Loss

==== Results ====
Date	Opponent	Venue	Result	Attendance	Motherwell Scorer(s)	Report
9 August 2008	Hearts	Tynecastle Stadium, Edinburgh (A)	2–3	14,219	Clarkson (2)	
16 August 2008	Aberdeen	Fir Park, Motherwell (H)	0–1	5,872		BBC Sport
23 August 2008	Dundee United	Fir Park, Motherwell (H)	1–1	5,149	Sutton	
30 August 2008	Hibernian	Easter Road, Edinburgh (A)	1–0	11,285	Sutton	
13 September 2008	Celtic	Fir Park, Motherwell (H)	2–4	5,872	Clarkson, Sutton	BBC Sport
21 September 2008	Rangers	Ibrox Stadium, Glasgow (A)	1–2	49,448		BBC Sport
27 September 2008	St Mirren	Fir Park, Motherwell (H)	2–1	4,786	Malcolm, Sutton	
5 October 2008	Falkirk	Fir Park, Motherwell(H)	3–2	4,509	Porter, Murphy, Sutton	
18 October 2008	Kilmarnock	Rugby Park, Kilmarnock (A)	0–1	5,113		
25 October 2008	Inverness CT	Caledonian Stadium, Inverness (A)	2–1	3,110	Malcolm (2)	
1 November 2008	Hamilton	Fir Park, Motherwell(H)	2–0	6,205	Porter (2) Sutton	
8 November 2008	Celtic	Celtic Park, Glasgow (A)	0–2	56,504		BBC Sport
12 November 2008	Rangers	Fir Park, Motherwell (H)	0–0	9,600		BBC Sport
15 November 2008	Falkirk	Falkirk Stadium, Falkirk (A)	0–1	5,279		
22 November 2008	Hibernian	Fir Park, Motherwell (H)	1–4	4,957	Malcolm	
29 November 2008	Aberdeen	Pittodrie Stadium, Aberdeen (A)	0–2	10,302		BBC Sport
15 December 2008	Kilmarnock	Fir Park, Motherwell (H)	0–2	3,339		
20 December 2008	Hamilton	New Douglas Park, Hamilton (A)	0–2	3,527		
27 December 2008	Inverness	Fir Park, Motherwell (H)	3–2	4,521	Porter (3)	
3 January 2009	St Mirren	Love Street, Paisley (A)	0–0	10,189		
7 January 2009	Hearts	Fir Park, Motherwell (H)	1–0	4,928	Porter	
17 January 2009	Dundee United	Tannadice, Dundee (A)	4–0	7,090	Klimpl, Porter, Clarkson, Fitzpatrick	
24 January 2009	Falkirk	Fir Park, Motherwell (H)	1–1	5,018	Clarkson	
31 January 2009	Hibernian	Easter Road, Edinburgh (A)	1–1	10,903	Clarkson	
14 February 2009	Hamilton	Fir Park, Motherwell (H)	1–0	5,197	Clarkson	
22 February 2009	Celtic	Fir Park, Motherwell (H)	1–1	8,593	Quinn	BBC Sport
28 February 2009	Inverness CT	Caledonian Stadium, Inverness (A)	2–1	3,611	Sutton, Sheridan	
4 March 2009	Hearts	Tynecastle, Edinburgh (A)	1–2	13,306	Hughes	BBC Sport
14 March 2009	Dundee United	Fir Park, Motherwell (H)	2–1	4,798	Clarkson, Sutton	BBC Sport
21 March 2009	Kilmarnock	Rugby Park, Kilmarnock (A)	0–0	5,434		BBC Sport
4 April 2009	Aberdeen	Fir Park, Motherwell (H)	1–1	4,686	O'Brien	BBC Sport
11 April 2009	Rangers	Ibrox Stadium, Glasgow (A)	1–3	50,080	Sutton	BBC Sport
18 April 2009	St Mirren	Fir Park, Motherwell (H)	0–2	6,626		BBC Sport
2 May 2009	Falkirk	Falkirk Stadium, Falkirk (A)	1–2	4,937	Clarkson (pen.)	BBC Sport
9 May 2009	St Mirren	St Mirren Park, Paisley (A)	3–1	4,002	Murphy, Clarkson (2)	BBC Sport
13 May 2009	Inverness CT	Fir Park, Motherwell (H)	2–2	2,818	McLean, Sutton	BBC Sport
16 May 2009	Hamilton	New Douglas Park, Hamilton (A)	3–0	3,383	Clarkson, Sheridan, Sutton	BBC Sport
23 May 2009	Kilmarnock	Fir Park, Motherwell (H)	1–2	4,186	McLean	BBC Sport

=== League Cup ===
Date	Round	Opponent	H/A	Score	Motherwell Scorer(s)	Attendance	Report
24 September 2008	3rd Round	Hamilton	H	1–2	Jamie Murphy	5,590	BBC Sport

=== UEFA Cup ===
Date	Round	Opponent	H/A	Score	Motherwell Scorer(s)	Attendance	Report
18 September 2008	1st Round	(France) AS Nancy	A	0–1		16,094	BBC Sport
2 October 2008	1st Round	(France) AS Nancy	H	0–2		11,318	BBC Sport

=== Scottish Cup ===
Date	Round	Opponent	H/A	Score	Motherwell Scorer(s)	Attendance	Report
2 February 2009	4th Round	Inverurie	A	3–0	John Sutton (2, 69), David Clarkson (57)	2,500	BBC Sport
7 February 2009	5th Round	St Mirren	H	1–1	Stephen Hughes (65)	5,695	BBC Sport
19 February 2009	5th Round Replay	St Mirren	A	0–1		4,555	BBC Sport

== Squad statistics ==
=== Appearances ===
As of match played 23 May 2009'

No.	Pos	Nat	Player	Total		Premier League		UEFA Cup		Scottish Cup		League Cup	
No.	Pos	Nat	Player	Apps	Goals	Apps	Goals	Apps	Goals	Apps	Goals	Apps	Goals
1	GK	(Scotland) SCO	Graeme Smith	43	0	37	0	2	0	3	0	1	0
2	DF	(Scotland) SCO	Paul Quinn	40	0	33+1	0	2	0	3	0	1	0
3	DF	(Scotland) SCO	Steven Hammell	43	0	37	0	2	0	3	0	1	0
4	DF	(Scotland) SCO	Mark Reynolds	42	0	36	0	2	0	3	0	1	0
5	DF	(Northern Ireland) NIR	Stephen Craigan	28	0	22	0	2	0	3	0	1	0
6	DF	(Northern Ireland) NIR	Brian McLean	12	2	12	2	0	0	0	0	0	0
7	MF	(Scotland) SCO	Stephen Hughes	40	2	35	1	2	0	2	1	1	0
8	MF	(Scotland) SCO	Bob Malcolm	16	2	11+2	2	2	0	0	0	1	0
9	FW	(Republic of Ireland) IRL	Cillian Sheridan	15	2	9+4	2	0	0	1+1	0	0	0
10	FW	(Scotland) SCO	David Clarkson	39	14	30+3	13	2	0	3	1	1	0
11	FW	(England) ENG	John Sutton	33	12	26+2	10	1+1	0	1+1	2	0+1	0
12	MF	(Scotland) SCO	Darren Smith	22	0	1+15	0	0+2	0	0+3	0	0+1	0
13	DF	(Slovakia) SVK	Maroš Klimpl	24	1	20+1	1	0	0	3	0	0	0
14	MF	(Scotland) SCO	Keith Lasley	33	0	24+4	0	2	0	2	0	1	0
15	FW	(Scotland) SCO	Jamie Murphy	34	3	11+19	2	0+2	0	0+1	0	1	1
16	MF	(Scotland) SCO	Marc Fitzpatrick	28	1	14+9	1	1	0	3	0	0+1	0
17	MF	(Scotland) SCO	Jim O'Brien	33	1	19+10	1	0	0	3	0	1	0
19	MF	(Scotland) SCO	Steven McGarry	25	0	16+7	0	1	0	0+1	0	0	0
21	GK	(Poland) POL	Artur Krysiak	1	0	1	0	0	0	0	0	0	0
35	FW	(Scotland) SCO	Bob McHugh	2	0	0+2	0	0	0	0	0	0	0
37	DF	(England) ENG	Shaun Hutchinson	1	0	1	0	0	0	0	0	0	0
43	DF	(Scotland) SCO	Steven Saunders	3	0	2+1	0	0	0	0	0	0	0
45	MF	(Scotland) SCO	Paul Slane	1	0	0+1	0	0	0	0	0	0	0
Players away from the club on loan:
Players who left Motherwell during the season:
9	FW	(England) ENG	Chris Porter	25	9	21+1	9	1+1	0	0	0	1	0

=== Goal scorers ===
As of match played 23 May 2009

Ranking	Nation	Position	Number	Name	Premier League	Scottish Cup	League Cup	UEFA Cup	Total
1	FW	(Scotland)	10	David Clarkson	13	1	0	0	14
2	FW	(England)	11	John Sutton	10	2	0	0	12
3	FW	(England)	9	Chris Porter	9	0	0	0	9
4	MF	(Scotland)	8	Bob Malcolm	3	0	0	0	3
4	FW	(Scotland)	15	Jamie Murphy	2	0	1	0	3
6	DF	(Northern Ireland)	28	Brian McLean	2	0	0	0	2
6	FW	(Republic of Ireland)	9	Cillian Sheridan	2	0	0	0	2
6	MF	(Scotland)	7	Stephen Hughes	1	1	0	0	2
9	DF	(Scotland)	16	Marc Fitzpatrick	1	0	0	0	1
9	DF	(Slovakia)	13	Maroš Klimpl	1	0	0	0	1
9	MF	(Scotland)	17	Jim O'Brien	1	0	0	0	1
9	DF	(Scotland)	12	Paul Quinn	1	0	0	0	1
TOTALS					46	4	1	0	51

=== Clean sheets ===
As of match played 23 May 2009

Ranking	Nation	Position	Number	Name	Premier League	Scottish Cup	League Cup	UEFA Cup	Total
1	GK	(Scotland)	1	Graeme Smith	9	1	0	0	10
TOTALS					9	1	0	0	10

=== Disciplinary record ===
As of match played 23 May 2009

Nation	Position	Number	Name	Premier League		Scottish Cup		League Cup		UEFA Cup		Total	
Nation	Position	Number	Name	Yellow card	Red card	Yellow card	Red card	Yellow card	Red card	Yellow card	Red card	Yellow card	Red card
(Scotland)	GK	1	Graeme Smith	3	0	0	0	0	0	0	0	3	0
(Scotland)	DF	2	Paul Quinn	5	2	0	0	0	0	0	0	5	2
(Scotland)	DF	3	Steven Hammell	4	0	0	0	1	0	0	0	5	0
(Scotland)	DF	4	Mark Reynolds	6	0	0	0	1	0	0	0	7	0
(Northern Ireland)	DF	5	Stephen Craigan	3	0	1	0	0	0	0	0	4	0
(Northern Ireland)	DF	6	Brian McLean	1	0	0	0	0	0	0	0	1	0
(Scotland)	MF	7	Stephen Hughes	2	0	0	0	0	0	0	0	2	0
(Scotland)	MF	8	Bob Malcolm	5	0	0	0	0	0	0	0	5	0
(Scotland)	FW	10	David Clarkson	6	1	0	0	0	0	0	0	6	1
(Slovakia)	DF	13	Maroš Klimpl	8	0	1	0	0	0	0	0	9	0
(Scotland)	MF	14	Keith Lasley	7	0	1	0	0	0	1	0	9	0
(Scotland)	MF	16	Marc Fitzpatrick	1	0	0	0	0	0	0	0	1	0
(Scotland)	MF	19	Steven McGarry	1	0	0	0	0	0	0	0	1	0
Players who left Motherwell during the season:
(England)	FW	9	Chris Porter	0	0	0	0	0	1	0	0	0	1
			TOTALS	52	3	3	0	2	1	1	0	58	4

== See also ==
- List of Motherwell F.C. seasons
