= 2009–10 Motherwell F.C. season =

Motherwell
2009–10 season
- Chairman: John Boyle
- Manager: Jim Gannon (Sacked), Craig Brown
- Scottish Premier League: Fifth place
- Scottish Cup: 4th Round
- League Cup: Quarter-Finals
- Europa League: Third qualifying round
- Top goalscorer: League: Lukas Jutkiewicz (12); All: John Sutton (13)
- Highest home attendance: 9,355 v Rangers, 12 September 2009
- Lowest home attendance: 3,544 v Dundee United, 18 April 2010
- Average home league attendance: 5,307
Home colours	Away colours

Motherwell competed in the Scottish Premier League, Scottish Cup, Scottish League Cup and UEFA Europa League during the 2009–10 season.

== Season events ==
- 30 June 2009 – Jim Gannon appointed new manager of the club, after he was made redundant by English League One side, Stockport
- 2 July 2009 – First competitive match of the season against Welsh Premier League side, Llanelli in the first qualifying round of the UEFA Europa League, a 1–0 defeat at Fir Park
- 6 August 2009 – Motherwell are eliminated from the UEFA Europa League in the third qualifying round by Steaua Bucharest
- 15 August 2009 – The first Scottish Premier League fixture of the season (against St Johnstone) ends in a 2–2 draw at McDiarmid Park
- 28 December 2009 – Jim Gannon is sacked by the board following continuous refusals to sign a contract with the club
- 29 December 2009 – Craig Brown is hired to fill the void as caretaker manager until a replacement for Gannon can be found
- 18 January 2010 – Motherwell are knocked out of the Scottish Cup after just one game, a 2–0 defeat to Inverness in the 4th round
- 23 March 2010 – Both St Johnstone and Falkirk play out a 1–1 draw, which confirms Motherwell's place in the top-six of the Scottish Premier League
- 5 May 2010 – Motherwell play their last home fixture of the year at Fir Park, a 6–6 draw with Hibernian, and break the league record for most goals in a single game
- 5 May 2010 – Hearts play out a 0–0 draw confirming a minimum finish of 5th place for Motherwell
- 9 May 2010 – A final day draw away to Rangers sees Motherwell fall just short of automatic qualification to the Europa League as Hibernian win at Tannadice
- 15 May 2010 – Dundee United win the Scottish Cup: Motherwell qualify for the 2010–11 UEFA Europa League second qualifying round.

== Squad ==
As of match played 9 May 2010

No.	Name	Nationality	Position	Date of birth (age)	Signed from	Signed in	Contract ends	Apps.	Goals
Goalkeepers
1	Michael Fraser	(Scotland)	GK	8 October 1983 (aged 26)	Inverness Caledonian Thistle	2009		9	0
21	John Ruddy	(England)	GK	24 October 1986 (aged 23)	on loan from Everton	2009	2010	39	0
	Ross Hyslop	(Scotland)	GK	11 October 1991 (aged 18)	Scunthorpe United	2009		0	0
Defenders
3	Steven Hammell	(Scotland)	DF	18 February 1982 (aged 28)	Southend United	2008	2010	341	2
4	Mark Reynolds	(Scotland)	DF	7 May 1987 (aged 23)	Academy	2004	2010	174	6
5	Stephen Craigan (c)	(Northern Ireland)	DF	29 October 1976 (aged 33)	Partick Thistle	2003		296	9
28	Shaun Hutchinson	(England)	DF	23 November 1990 (aged 19)	Academy	2008		10	4
43	Steven Saunders	(Scotland)	DF	30 March 1991 (aged 19)	Academy	2008		35	1
Midfielders
6	Giles Coke	(England)	MF	3 June 1986 (aged 23)	Northampton Town	2009	2010	37	2
7	Chris Humphrey	(Jamaica)	MF	19 September 1987 (aged 22)	Shrewsbury Town	2009	2012	33	0
8	Steve Jennings	(England)	MF	28 October 1984 (aged 25)	Tranmere Rovers	2009	2010	33	2
14	Keith Lasley	(Scotland)	MF	21 September 1979 (aged 30)	Unattached	2006		222	13
16	Marc Fitzpatrick	(Scotland)	MF	11 May 1986 (aged 23)	Academy	2002	2010	136	5
17	Jim O'Brien	(Republic of Ireland)	MF	28 September 1987 (aged 22)	Celtic	2008	2010	72	4
18	Michael McGlinchey	(New Zealand)	MF	7 January 1987 (aged 23)	on loan from Central Coast Mariners	2010	2010	8	0
24	Tom Hateley	(England)	MF	12 September 1989 (aged 20)	Reading	2009	2010	41	3
27	Ross Forbes	(Scotland)	MF	3 March 1989 (aged 21)	Academy	2008		37	9
32	Steven Meechan	(Scotland)	MF	30 March 1991 (aged 19)	Academy	2009		2	0
39	Jordan Halsman	(Scotland)	MF	13 June 1991 (aged 18)	Academy	2009		1	0
46	Jamie Pollock	(Scotland)	MF	20 February 1992 (aged 18)	Academy	2009		1	0
32	Steven Meechan	(Scotland)	MF	30 March 1991 (aged 19)	Academy	2009		2	0
38	Ryan Scanlon	(Scotland)	MF	25 September 1992 (aged 17)	Ross County	2009	2012	0	0
	Steven Lawless	(Scotland)	MF	12 April 1991 (aged 19)	Academy	2009		0	0
Forwards
9	Lukas Jutkiewicz	(England)	FW	28 March 1989 (aged 21)	on loan from Everton	2009	2010	36	12
11	John Sutton	(England)	FW	26 December 1983 (aged 26)	Wycombe Wanderers	2008	2011	75	26
15	Jamie Murphy	(Scotland)	FW	28 August 1989 (aged 20)	Academy	2006		97	14
33	Mark Archdeacon	(Scotland)	FW	9 October 1989 (aged 20)	Academy	2007		1	0
35	Bob McHugh	(Scotland)	FW	16 July 1991 (aged 18)	Academy	2007		18	2
	Gary Smith	(Scotland)	FW	28 May 1991 (aged 18)	Queen's Park	2009		0	0
Away on loan
29	Jonathan Page	(England)	DF	8 February 1990 (aged 20)	Portsmouth	2008		3	0
Left during the season
2	Yassin Moutaouakil	(France)	DF	18 July 1986 (aged 23)	on loan from Charlton Athletic	2009	2010	15	0
18	Steven McGarry	(Scotland)	MF	28 September 1979 (aged 30)	Ross County	2006	2010	104	4
45	Paul Slane	(Scotland)	MF	25 November 1991 (aged 18)	Academy	2007		9	1

== Transfers ==
=== In ===
Date	Position	Nationality	Name	From	Fee	Ref
1 June 2009	GK	(Scotland)	Michael Fraser	Inverness Caledonian Thistle	Free	
1 July 2009	MF	(England)	Stephen Jennings	Tranmere Rovers	Free	
15 July 2009	MF	(Jamaica)	Chris Humphrey	Shrewsbury Town	Free	
21 July 2009	MF	(England)	Giles Coke	Northampton Town	Free	
13 August 2009	MF	(England)	Tom Hateley	Reading	Free	
7 September 2009	MF	(Scotland)	Ryan Scanlon	Ross County	Undisclosed	

=== Loans in ===
Date from	Position	Nationality	Name	From	Date to	Ref.
24 July 2009	GK	(England)	John Ruddy	Everton	End of season	
26 August 2009	FW	(England)	Lukas Jutkiewicz	Everton	End of season	
1 September 2009	DF	(France)	Yassin Moutaouakil	Charlton Athletic		
2 January 2010	MF	(New Zealand)	Michael McGlinchey	Central Coast Mariners	End of season	

=== Out ===
Date	Position	Nationality	Name	To	Fee	Ref.
29 June 2009	FW	(Scotland)	David Clarkson	Bristol City	£600,000	
4 July 2009	DF	(Scotland)	Paul Quinn	Cardiff City	£300,000	
1 February 2010	MF	(Scotland)	Paul Slane	Celtic	Undisclosed	

=== Loans out ===
Date from	Position	Nationality	Name	To	Date to	Ref.
31 January 2010	DF	(England)	Jonathan Page	Stirling Albion	End of season	

=== Released ===
Date	Position	Nationality	Name	Joined	Date	Ref.
	MF	(Scotland)	Steven McGarry	Perth Glory		
31 May 2010	GK	(Poland)	Sebastian Kosiorowski			
31 May 2010	GK	(Scotland)	Ross Hyslop	Queen of the South	1 June 2010	
31 May 2010	MF	(England)	Giles Coke	Sheffield Wednesday	1 July 2010	
31 May 2010	MF	(Republic of Ireland)	Jim O'Brien	Barnsley	1 July 2010	
31 May 2010	FW	(Scotland)	Darren Smith	Ross County	23 July 2010	

== Friendlies ==
Date	Opponent	H/A	Score	Motherwell scorer(s)	Attendance	Report
27 June 2009	(Wales) Rhyl	H	1–3	Forbes (47)	0 (match was closed-doors)	
6 September 2009	(England) Manchester United XI	H	1–0	Coke (53)	3,470	Motherwell F.C.
4 January 2010	(Scotland) Bellshill Athletic	A	11–1	O'Brien, Meechan, Smith, Jutkiewicz, Sutton, McHugh, Murphy	0 (match was closed-doors)	Motherwell F.C.

== Competitions ==
=== Overall ===
Competition	Started round	Current position / round	Final position / round	First match	Last match
Scottish Premier League	—	—	5	15 August 2009	9 May 2010
League Cup	3rd Round	—	Quarter-finals	22 September 2009	27 October 2009
Scottish Cup	4th Round	—	4th Round	18 January 2010	18 January 2010
UEFA Europa League	First qualifying round	—	Third qualifying round	2 July 2009	6 August 2009

Source: Competitions

=== Premier League ===
==== Table ====
Pos	Team	Pld	W	D	L	GF	GA	GD	Pts	Qualification or relegation
3	Dundee United	38	17	12	9	55	47	+8	63	Qualification for the Europa League play-off round (Note: by winning the Scottish Cup.)
4	Hibernian	38	15	9	14	58	55	+3	54	Qualification for the Europa League third qualifying round
5	Motherwell	38	13	14	11	52	54	−2	53	Qualification for the Europa League second qualifying round
6	Heart of Midlothian	38	13	9	16	35	46	−11	48	
7	Hamilton Academical	38	13	10	15	39	46	−7	49	

Source: SPFL Archive
Rules for classification: 1) points; 2) goal difference; 3) number of goals scored.

==== Results summary ====
Overall								Home						Away					
Pld	W	D	L	GF	GA	GD	Pts	W	D	L	GF	GA	GD	W	D	L	GF	GA	GD
38	13	14	11	52	54	−2	53	8	5	5	29	25	+4	5	9	6	23	29	−6

Source: BBC Sport

==== Results by round ====
Round	1	2	3	4	5	6	7	8	9	10	11	12	13	14	15	16	17	18	19	20	21	22	23	24	25	26	27	28	29	30	31	32	33	34	35	36	37	38
Ground	A	H	A	H	A	H	H	A	A	H	A	H	H	A	H	A	H	A	A	H	A	A	H	H	A	H	H	A	A	H	A	H	A	H	A	A	H	A
Result	D	W	D	D	W	L	W	D	D	W	D	D	D	L	L	L	L	L	W	W	D	W	W	D	D	W	W	W	D	W	L	L	L	L	W	L	D	D
Position	5	3	5	5	4	6	5	5	5	4	5	5	5	5	5	5	6	6	6	6	7	5	5	5	5	5	5	5	5	4	5	5	5	5	4	4	4	5

Source: BBC Sport
A = Away; H = Home; W = Win; D = Draw; L = Loss

==== Results ====
Match Day	Date	Opponent	H/A	Score	Motherwell scorer(s)	League Position	Attendance	Report
1	15 August 2009	St Johnstone	A	2–2	Hutchinson (55), Forbes (65)	5	5,220	BBC Sport
2	22 August 2009	Kilmarnock	H	3–1	Sutton (14), Forbes (45) (pen.), Hutchinson (68)	3	5,093	BBC Sport
3	29 August 2009	Aberdeen	A	0–0		5	11,320	BBC Sport
4	12 September 2009	Rangers	H	0–0		5	9,355	BBC Sport
5	19 September 2009	Dundee United	A	1–0	Forbes (65)	4	7,196	BBC Sport
6	26 September 2009	Hibernian	H	1–3	Reynolds (35)	6	5,221	BBC Sport
7	3 October 2009	Falkirk	H	1–0	Jutkiewicz (18)	5	4,337	BBC Sport
8	17 October 2009	Celtic	A	0–0		5	58,000	BBC Sport
9	24 October 2009	St Mirren	A	3–3	Forbes (49) (pen.), Jutkiewicz (74, 81)	5	4,327	BBC Sport
10	31 October 2009	Hearts	H	1–0	Forbes (55)	4	4,830	BBC Sport
11	7 November 2009	Hamilton	A	2–2	Murphy (78), Jutkiewicz (87)	5	3,583	BBC Sport
12	21 November 2009	Aberdeen	H	1–1	Jutkiewicz (13)	5	4,662	BBC Sport
13	28 November 2009	Dundee United	H	2–2	Sutton (16), Jutkiewicz (29)	5	4,593	BBC Sport
14	5 December 2009	Hibernian	A	0–2		5	10,398	BBC Sport
15	12 December 2009	Celtic	H	2–3	Jutkiewicz (26), Reynolds (45)	5	7,807	BBC Sport
16	19 December 2009	Rangers	A	1–6	Hutchinson (67)	5	44,291	BBC Sport
17	26 December 2009	St Johnstone	H	1–3	Jennings (39)	6	4,140	BBC Sport
18	30 December 2009	Hearts	A	0–1		6	14,411	BBC Sport
19	16 January 2010	Kilmarnock	A	3–0	O'Brien (55, 70), Jutkiewicz (78)	6	5,354	BBC Sport
20	23 January 2010	St Mirren	H	2–0	Murphy (56), Sutton (76)	6	3,621	BBC Sport
21	27 January 2010	Falkirk	A	0–0		7	4,321	BBC Sport
22	30 January 2010	Aberdeen	A	3–0	Sutton (29, 53), Jutkiewicz (50)	5	9,555	BBC Sport
23	6 February 2010	Hamilton	H	1–0	Jutkiewicz (68)	5	4,777	BBC Sport
24	10 February 2010	Rangers	H	1–1	Hateley (28)	5	9,352	BBC Sport
25	13 February 2010	Hamilton	A	0–0		5	3,133	BBC Sport
26	20 February 2010	Hibernian	H	1–0	Murphy (82)	5	5,055	BBC Sport
27	27 February 2010	Kilmarnock	H	1–0	Murphy (69)	5	4,178	BBC Sport
28	6 March 2010	St Johnstone	A	2–1	Murphy (12), Sutton (86)	5	3,669	BBC Sport
29	9 March 2010	St Mirren	A	0–0		5	3,154	BBC Sport
30	13 March 2010	Hearts	H	3–1	Reynolds (2), Sutton (13), O'Brien (68)	4	4,448	BBC Sport
31	27 March 2010	Dundee United	A	0–3		5	7,609	BBC Sport
32	3 April 2010	Falkirk	H	0–1		5	4,268	BBC Sport
33	13 April 2010	Celtic	A	1–2	Reynolds (49)	5	27,750	BBC Sport
34	18 April 2010	Dundee United	H	2–3	Sutton (28, 81)	5	3,544	BBC Sport
35	24 April 2010	Hearts	A	2–0	Saunders (42), Žaliūkas (o.g.) (45)	4	13,447	BBC Sport
36	1 May 2010	Celtic	A	0–4		4	24,000	BBC Sport
37	5 May 2010	Hibernian	H	6–6	Coke (16, 67), Sutton (39, 76), Hateley (72), Jutkiewicz (90)	4	6,241	BBC Sport
38	9 May 2010	Rangers	A	3–3	Murphy (51), Jennings (90), Jutkiewicz (90) (pen.)	5	50,321	BBC Sport

Note: Due to postponements between match day 18 and match day 19 (not shown above), Motherwell's position in the Scottish Premier League dropped to 8th place. The win on match day 19 served to allow them to leapfrog the teams in 6th and 7th place while still having two games in hand.

=== UEFA Europa League ===
Date	Round	Opponent	H/A	Score	Motherwell scorer(s)	Attendance	Report
2 July 2009	FQR	(Wales) Llanelli	H	0–1		4,307	BBC Sport
9 July 2009	FQR	(Wales) Llanelli	A	3–0	Sutton (8, 24) Murphy (72)	3,025	BBC Sport
16 July 2009	SQR	(Albania) Flamurtari Vlorë	A	0–1		4,012	BBC Sport
23 July 2009	SQR	(Albania) Flamurtari Vlorë	H	8–1	Murphy (16, 19, 34) Slane (25) Forbes (pen 28, 50) Shaun Hutchinson (37) McHugh (72)	4,641	BBC Sport
30 July 2009	TQR	(Romania) Steaua Bucharest	A	0–3		25,000	BBC Sport
6 August 2009	TQR	(Romania) Steaua Bucharest	H	1–3	Forbes (17)	4,975	BBC Sport

=== Scottish League Cup ===
Date	Round	Opponent	H/A	Score	Motherwell scorer(s)	Attendance	Report
22 September 2009	3rd Round	Inverness CT	H	3–2	McHugh, Own goal, Forbes	3,905	BBC Sport
27 October 2009	Quarter-Final	St Mirren	A	0–3	—	4,325	BBC Sport

=== Scottish Cup ===
Date	Round	Opponent	H/A	Score	Motherwell scorer(s)	Attendance	Report
18 January 2010	4th Round	Inverness CT	A	0–2	—	1,450	BBC Sport

== Squad statistics ==
=== Appearances ===
As of match played 9 May 2010

No.	Pos	Nat	Player	Total		Premier League		Scottish Cup		League Cup		Europa League	
No.	Pos	Nat	Player	Apps	Goals	Apps	Goals	Apps	Goals	Apps	Goals	Apps	Goals
1	GK	(Scotland) SCO	Michael Fraser	9	0	4+1	0	0	0	0	0	4	0
2	DF	(France) FRA	Yassin Moutaouakil	15	0	13	0	0	0	2	0	0	0
3	DF	(Scotland) SCO	Steven Hammell	40	0	33	0	1	0	1	0	4+1	0
4	DF	(Scotland) SCO	Mark Reynolds	46	4	37	4	1	0	2	0	6	0
5	DF	(Northern Ireland) NIR	Stephen Craigan	36	0	28	0	1	0	1	0	6	0
6	MF	(England) ENG	Giles Coke	37	2	25+7	2	1	0	2	0	2	0
7	MF	(Jamaica) JAM	Chris Humphrey	33	0	6+22	0	1	0	0+1	0	2+1	0
8	MF	(England) ENG	Steve Jennings	33	2	21+8	2	0	0	0+1	0	2+1	0
9	FW	(England) ENG	Lukas Jutkiewicz	36	12	27+6	12	1	0	2	0	0	0
11	FW	(England) ENG	John Sutton	42	14	31+4	12	0+1	0	0	0	6	2
14	MF	(Scotland) SCO	Keith Lasley	25	1	15+5	0	1	1	0	0	3+1	0
15	FW	(Scotland) SCO	Jamie Murphy	44	10	24+11	6	0+1	0	1+1	0	3+3	4
16	MF	(Scotland) SCO	Marc Fitzpatrick	4	0	1+2	0	0	0	0	0	0+1	0
17	MF	(Scotland) SCO	Jim O'Brien	44	3	29+6	3	1	0	2	0	5+1	0
18	MF	(New Zealand) NZL	Michael McGlinchey	8	0	1+7	0	0	0	0	0	0	0
21	GK	(England) ENG	John Ruddy	39	0	34	0	1	0	2	0	2	0
23	FW	(Scotland) SCO	Mark Archdeacon	1	0	0	0	0	0	0	0	0+1	0
24	MF	(England) ENG	Tom Hateley	41	3	38	3	1	0	2	0	0	0
27	MF	(Scotland) SCO	Ross Forbes	37	9	22+6	5	0+1	0	1+1	1	6	3
28	DF	(England) ENG	Shaun Hutchinson	9	4	4+1	3	0	0	1	0	3	1
32	MF	(Scotland) SCO	Steven Meechan	2	0	1+1	0	0	0	0	0	0	0
35	FW	(Scotland) SCO	Robert McHugh	15	2	2+8	0	0	0	1+1	1	0+3	1
39	MF	(Scotland) SCO	Jordan Halsman	1	0	0+1	0	0	0	0	0	0	0
43	DF	(Scotland) SCO	Steven Saunders	32	1	22+3	1	1	0	2	0	4	0
46	MF	(Scotland) SCO	Jamie Pollock	1	0	0+1	0	0	0	0	0	0	0
Players away from the club on loan:
29	DF	(England) ENG	Jonathan Page	3	0	0	0	0	0	0	0	0+3	0
Players who left Motherwell during the season:
19	MF	(Scotland) SCO	Steven McGarry	5	0	0+1	0	0	0	0+1	0	3	0
45	MF	(Scotland) SCO	Paul Slane	8	1	0+2	0	0	0	0	0	5+1	1

=== Goal scorers ===
As of match played 9 May 2010

Ranking	Nation	Position	Number	Name	Premier League	Scottish Cup	League Cup	Europa League	Total
1	FW	(England)	11	John Sutton	12	0	0	2	14
2	FW	(England)	9	Lukas Jutkiewicz	12	0	0	0	12
3	FW	(Scotland)	15	Jamie Murphy	6	0	0	4	10
4	MF	(Scotland)	20	Ross Forbes	5	0	1	3	9
5	DF	(Scotland)	4	Mark Reynolds	4	0	0	0	4
5	DF	(England)	28	Shaun Hutchinson	3	0	0	1	4
7	MF	(England)	24	Tom Hateley	3	0	0	0	3
7	MF	(Scotland)	17	Jim O'Brien	3	0	0	0	3
9	MF	(England)	6	Giles Coke	2	0	0	0	2
9	MF	(England)	8	Steve Jennings	2	0	0	0	2
9	FW	(Scotland)	35	Bob McHugh	0	0	1	1	2
12	DF	(Scotland)	43	Steven Saunders	1	0	0	0	1
12	FW	(Scotland)	45	Paul Slane	0	0	0	1	1
12				Own goal	1	0	0	0	1
TOTALS					54	0	3	12	69

=== Clean sheets ===
Ranking	Position	Nation	Number	Name	Premier League	Scottish Cup	League Cup	Europa League	Total
1	GK	(England)	21	John Ruddy	15	0	0	0	15
2	GK	(Scotland)	1	Michael Fraser	1	0	0	1	2
				TOTALS	16	0	0	1	17

=== Disciplinary record ===
As of match played 9 May 2010

Nation	Position	Number	Name	Premier League		Scottish Cup		League Cup		Europa League		Total	
Nation	Position	Number	Name	Booked	Sent off (straight red)	Booked	Sent off (straight red)	Booked	Sent off (straight red)	Booked	Sent off (straight red)	Booked	Sent off (straight red)
(Scotland)	DF	3	Steven Hammell	4	0	0	0	0	0	1	0	5	0
(Scotland)	DF	4	Mark Reynolds	3	0	0	0	0	0	0	0	3	0
(Northern Ireland)	DF	5	Stephen Craigan	3	0	0	0	0	0	0	0	3	0
(England)	MF	6	Giles Coke	4	1	0	0	0	0	0	0	4	1
(England)	MF	8	Steve Jennings	6	0	0	0	0	0	0	0	6	0
(England)	FW	11	John Sutton	1	0	0	0	0	0	0	0	1	0
(Scotland)	FW	15	Jamie Murphy	3	0	0	0	0	0	0	0	3	0
(Scotland)	MF	17	Jim O'Brien	4	0	1	0	0	0	0	0	5	0
(England)	MF	24	Tom Hateley	5	0	1	0	1	0	0	0	7	0
(Scotland)	MF	27	Ross Forbes	0	0	0	0	0	0	2	0	2	0
(England)	DF	28	Shaun Hutchinson	0	0	0	0	0	0	1	0	1	0
(Scotland)	MF	46	Jamie Pollock	1	0	0	0	0	0	0	0	1	0
(Scotland)	DF	43	Steven Saunders	0	0	0	0	0	0	1	0	1	0
			Totals	34	1	2	0	1	0	5	0	42	1

== See also ==
- List of Motherwell F.C. seasons
