= Kosiorowski =

Kosiorowski (feminine: Kosiorowska; plural: Kosiorowscy) is a Polish surname. Notable people with this surname include:

- Piotr Kosiorowski (born 1981), Polish footballer
- Sebastian Kosiorowski (born 1990), Polish footballer
