= Mark Reynolds (footballer, born 1987) =

Scottish footballer (born 1987)

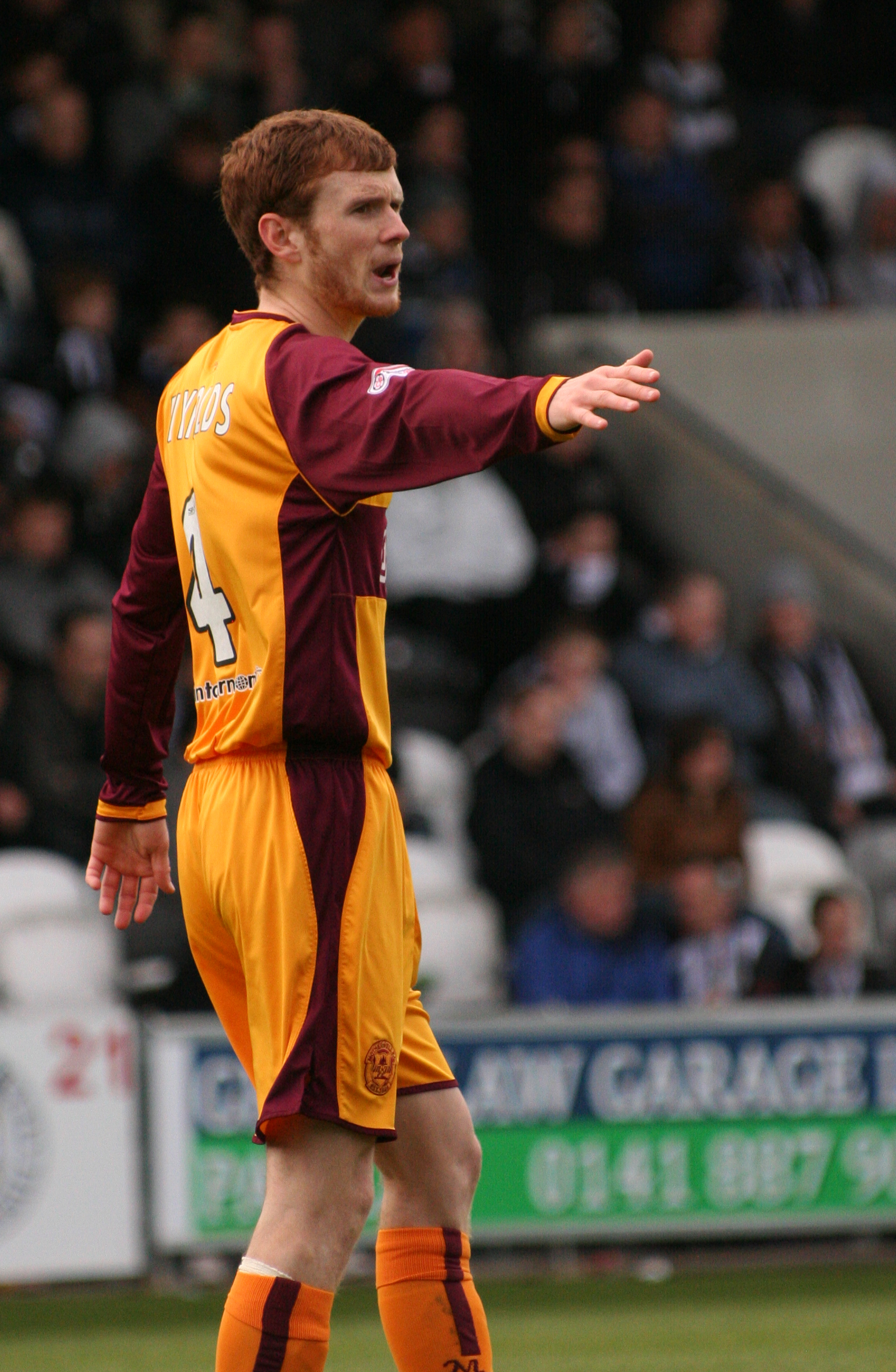
- Reynolds for Motherwell in 2009

Personal information
- Full name: Mark Reynolds
- Date of birth: 7 May 1987 (age 39)
- Place of birth: Motherwell, Scotland
- Height: 6 ft 1 in (1.85 m)
- Position: Defender

Youth career
- 2003–2005: Motherwell

Senior career*
Years	Team	Apps	(Gls)
2005–2011	Motherwell	166	(6)
2011–2013	Sheffield Wednesday	10	(0)
2012	→ Aberdeen (loan)	16	(0)
2012	→ Aberdeen (loan)	23	(1)
2013–2019	Aberdeen	147	(5)
2019	→ Dundee United (loan)	12	(0)
2019–2022	Dundee United	61	(1)
2022–2024	Cove Rangers	72	(5)
2024–	Banks o' Dee	0	(0)

International career^{‡}
2007	Scotland U20	5	(1)
2007–2008	Scotland U21	8	(0)
2009	Scotland B	1	(0)
- * Club domestic league appearances and goals as of 4 May 2024 ‡ National team caps and goals as of 23 August 2009

Mark Reynolds (born 7 May 1987) is a former Scottish professional footballer who played as a defender. He began his career at Motherwell and has also played for Sheffield Wednesday, Aberdeen, Dundee United and Cove Rangers.

== Club career ==
=== Motherwell ===
Born in Motherwell, Scotland, Reynolds started his career at Hibernian, where his Dad was working at the time when he was somewhere 9 or 10 years old. Reynolds then joined hometown club Motherwell when he was sixteen years old and progressed through the club's youth system. Reynolds then signed a two–year contract youth training scheme with Motherwell following the intervention of manager Terry Butcher. During the 2005–06 season, he was promoted to the club's first team and appeared as an unused substitute, in a 1–1 draw against Dunfermline Athletic on 28 January 2006. On 3 May 2006, Reynolds made his professional debut for Motherwell, starting a match and played 80 minutes before being substituted, in a 1–0 win over relegated Livingston.

Ahead of the 2006–07 season, newspaper The Herald expected Reynolds to make a first team breakthrough at Motherwell. On 12 August 2006, he made his first appearance of the season, starting the whole game, in a 2–0 loss against Aberdeen. Since the start of the season, Reynolds became a first team regular, forming a centre–back partnership with Stephen Craigan. On 30 September 2006, he scored his first goal of the season, in a 5–0 win over Kilmarnock. Reynolds then signed a four–year contract with the club. On 16 December 2006, he scored his second goal of the season, in a 3–2 loss against Dundee United. His performance attracted interests from Rangers. Reynolds' performance through April saw him named the league's Young Player of the Month for April. After returning from international duty, he received a red card for handball, in a 4–1 loss against Dunfermline Athletic on 7 May 2007. But Reynolds made his return to the starting line–up, in a 0–0 draw against Dundee United in the last game of the season. At the end of the 2006–07 season, he went on to make forty–one appearances and scoring two times in all competitions.

In the 2007–08 season, Reynolds continued to be a first team regular and remained partnering with Craigan in the centre–back position. His performances led to both him and David Clarkson, signed a contract extension, keeping him at Motherwell until 2011. He helped the club keep three consecutive clean sheets between 10 November 2007 and 1 December 2007. By the end of November, Reynolds signed a one–year contract with Motherwell, keeping him until 2011. On 5 April 2008, he helped the club keep a clean sheet, in a 1–0 win against defending champions, Celtic. After the match, newspaper Glasgow Times praised Reynolds' performance, saying: "He was fantastic at the heart of the Motherwell defence and Stephen Craigan wasn't far behind him." At the end of the 2007–08 season, Reynolds played in every league match, as he made forty–four appearances in all competitions.

It was reported on 5 June 2008 that Rangers had made an offer of £750,000 for Reynolds, which was turned down by Motherwell. It came after when he was linked with a move away from the club. Then-Motherwell manager Mark McGhee explained that he wanted to retain the club's better players ahead of their UEFA Cup campaign. Reynolds stayed at Motherwell for another season and stated he would prefer to play in the English Premier League than join either of a Scotland's Old Firm clubs. Despite suffering a knee injury that saw him ruled out for an international duty with Scotland, Reynolds returned to the starting line–up, in a 1–1 draw against Dundee United on 23 August 2008. In a match against Celtic on 13 September 2008, he was at fault for his role, leading to Scott McDonald to score the third goal of the game, in a 4–2 loss. Reynolds went on to make his European debut, playing in both legs against AS Nancy in the first round of the UEFA Cup, as the club were eliminated from the tournament. He continued to remain in the first team, maintaining his partnership with Craigan in the centre–back position. On 1 November 2008, Reynolds played his 100th game for Motherwell, in a 2–0 Lanarkshire derby win over Hamilton Academical. He helped the club keep three consecutive clean sheets between 3 January 2009 and 18 January 2009. At the end of the 2008–09 season, Reynolds had made forty–two appearances in all competitions. Despite the criticisms for his performance during the season, he reflected on manager Mark McGhee, crediting him for putting his career on track from "the lowest point in his career".

In the 2009–10 season, Reynolds played in all six games of Motherwell's Europa League campaign where Motherwell was eventually eliminated by Steaua București. He helped the club keep three consecutive clean sheets between 29 August 2009 and 1 September 2009. Reynolds continued to remain in the first team, maintaining his partnership with Craigan in the centre–back position. But he also began to play in the holding midfield position under the management of Jim Gannon. On 26 September 2009, Reynolds scored his first goal of the season, in a 3–1 loss against Hibernian. He reflected on the 2009–10 season so far, saying: "I'm still only 22 but I feel like a veteran in that defence. I've been given more responsibility with the captain's armband and I'm trying to be more vocal but the team is so strong that we're all fighting for ourselves." On 12 December 2009, Reynolds scored his second goal of the season, in a 3–2 loss against Celtic. He, once again, helped Motherwell keep five consecutive clean sheets in the league between 16 January 2010 and 6 February 2010. Reynolds then helped the club keep three consecutive clean sheets between 13 February 2010 and 27 February 2010. On 13 March 2010, he scored his third goal of the season, in a 3–1 win against Heart of Midlothian. A month later on 13 April 2010, Reynolds scored his fourth goal of the season, in a 2–1 loss against Celtic. At the end of the 2009–10 season, he went on to make forty–six appearances and scoring four times in all competitions.

Throughout the summer transfer window of 2010, Reynolds was linked with a move away from Motherwell, as clubs from Europe, such as, Bari, Nottingham Forest and PSV Eindhoven were interested in signing him. Manager Craig Brown admitted the club need to sell Reynolds to improve their finances. On 31 August 2010, it was reported that Swansea City had put in a bid for the defender, which was turned down by Motherwell as it did not meet their valuation for the player, who was in the final year of his contract. Following the end of the summer transfer window, he remained at the club throughout the first half of the season. At the start of the 2010–11 season, Reynolds played in all six Motherwell's European matches in the UEFA Europa League, winning both matches against Breiðablik and Aalesunds before the club was eliminated by Odense BK. He continued to remain in the first team, maintaining his partnership with Craigan in the centre–back position. On 14 December 2010, Reynolds scored an own goal in a 2–1 loss against Hearts. On 1 January 2011, he played his 200th game for Motherwell in a Lanarkshire derby, as the match ended in a 0–0 draw. When the January transfer window opened, Reynolds continued to be linked a move away from the club. By the time he left Motherwell, Reynolds made twenty–seven appearances in all competitions. He also went on to play more than 200 games for Motherwell,

=== Sheffield Wednesday ===
An offer of £100,000 plus additional clauses from Sheffield Wednesday was accepted on 15 January 2011. The deal was completed a day later. After his move, Reynolds said he had made the right decision to join the club and was looking forward to making an impact in English football. Reynolds also stated that a reason for joining the Owls was to play in front of 20,000 supporters.

He made his debut for the club, starting a match and played 76 minutes before being substituted, in a 2–2 draw against Yeovil Town on 25 January 2011. In his first half-season, Reynolds made seven appearances for Sheffield Wednesday in all competitions. The 2011–12 season saw Reynolds find himself out of the first team and began to struggle to get his place back. He made only ten league appearances for the club throughout 2011.

Ahead of the 2012–13 season, Reynolds was told by Sheffield Wednesday manager Dave Jones that he was surplus to requirements and won't get first team guarantee, Upon returning to the Owls from his second loan spell with Aberdeen, he left Sheffield Wednesday by mutual consent on 31 January 2013.

==== Aberdeen (loan spells) ====
On 6 January 2012, Reynolds was loaned out to Scottish Premier League club Aberdeen for the rest of the 2011–12 season, joining up with manager Craig Brown who had previously been his manager at Motherwell.

Having been brought in as a replacement for Richard Foster, he made his debut for the club, starting the whole game, in a 0–0 draw against Kilmarnock on 14 January 2012. Reynolds helped Aberdeen keep three consecutive clean sheets between 28 January 2012 and 19 February 2012. Since joining the club, he became a first team regular, forming a centre–back partnership with Andrew Considine. Reynolds then played twice against his former club on 11 March 2012 and 17 March 2012, as Aberdeen won in the Scottish Cup and loss in the league respectively. On 2 May 2012, he scored an own goal early on in a game with Hibernian at Pittodrie, which the visitors went on to win 2–1. At the end of the 2011–12 season, Reynolds had made twenty–one appearances in all competitions.

On 9 August 2012, Reynolds returned to Aberdeen on loan for the 2012–13 season. Upon arriving for the second time, Reynolds said he joined Aberdeen instead of Rangers as "it's a strange situation there at the moment", as the Glasgow team had been re-admitted to the third tier of the Scottish leagues. Reynolds played his first match of his second loan spell as a substitute in a 2–1 win over St Johnstone on 18 August 2012. Since joining the club on loan for the second time, he continued to remain in the first team, maintaining his partnership with Considine and Russell Anderson. On 3 November 2012. Reynolds scored an own goal, in a 2–1 loss against Ross County. A week later on 10 November 2012, he scored his first goal for Aberdeen, in a 4–1 win over St Mirren. The following month, Aberdeen chief executive Duncan Fraser announced that the club had opened negotiations to sign Reynolds on a permanent deal, with a possible three-year contract on the table. Throughout his second loan spell at Aberdeen, Reynolds made twenty–eight appearances and scored once in all competitions.

=== Aberdeen (permanent transfer) ===
On 31 January 2013, Reynolds immediately rejoined Aberdeen on a free transfer, signing a four-and-a-half-year contract.

Reynolds' first game after signing for the club on a permanent basis came on 3 February 2013, in a 1–0 loss against Hibernian in the last 16 of the Scottish Cup. In a follow–up match against St Mirren, he received a red card for a second bookable offence, in a 0–0 draw. After serving a one match suspension, Reynolds returned to the starting line–up against Kilmarnock on 9 March 2013. At the end of the 2012–13 season, he went on to make forty–one appearances and scored once in all competitions.

Reynolds was appointed vice-captain of Aberdeen for the 2013–14 season. On 10 August 2013, he scored his first goal of the season, in a 3–1 win against his former club Motherwell. In a match against Alloa Athletic in the Scottish League Cup, Reynolds scored a winning penalty to help the club advance to the next round. He helped Aberdeen keep four consecutive clean sheets between 31 August 2013 and 25 September 2013. Reynolds, once again, helped the club keep another four consecutive clean sheets between 19 October 2013 and 4 November 2013. Reynolds continued to remain in the first team, maintaining his partnership with Considine and Anderson, though he began to play in the left–back position. However, during a match against Inverness Caledonian Thistle on 21 December 2013, Reynolds suffered a facial injury and was substituted in the 64th minute, as the club won 4–3. After missing one match with an injury, he returned to the starting line–up as captain, in a 1–0 win against Ross County on 29 December 2013. On 5 January 2014, Reynolds scored the only goal of the game, in a 1–0 win against Kilmarnock. A month later on 25 February 2014, he captained Aberdeen against Celtic and helped the club win 2–1, giving the opposition team their first league loss of the season. Three days later on 28 February 2014, he signed a new four-year contract extension with Aberdeen, keeping him until 2018. At that time, former Aberdeen captain Willie Miller compared Reynolds's central defensive partnership with Russell Anderson to his own successful pairing with Alex McLeish. On 16 March 2014, he started in the 2014 Scottish League Cup Final victory against Inverness Caledonian Thistle, his first domestic honour and Aberdeen's first piece of silverware in 19 years. In the last game of the season, Reynolds helped the club finish third place in the league after losing 1–0 against his former club, Motherwell. At the end of the 2013–14 season, he went on to make forty–six appearances in all competitions. For his performance, Reynolds was named PFA Scotland Team of the Year. He also won Aberdeen's Player of the Year.

At the start of the 2014–15 season, Reynolds played all six matches in Aberdeen's matches in the UEFA Europa League that saw the club progress through to the third qualifying round of the tournament. He played in both legs in the third round qualifying round of the UEFA Europa League against Real Sociedad and scored first European goal in the second leg, in a 3–2 loss and Aberdeen were eliminated from the tournament. Since the start of the 2014–15 season, Reynolds continued to remain in the first team, maintaining his partnership with Considine and Ash Taylor. He also captained Aberdeen matches in the absence of Anderson for most of the 2014–15 season. On 30 September 2014, Reynold scored his first goal of the season against St Mirren, but he then gave away a penalty for the opposition team to successfully converted the penalty, as the match ended in a 2–2 draw. After the match, teammate Peter Pawlett defended Reynolds' performance, saying he will bounce back. Reynolds led the club to keeping an eight match consecutive clean sheets in the league between 23 November 2014 and 10 January 2015. Reynolds, once again, helped Aberdeen keep three consecutive clean sheets between 7 February 2015 and 21 February 2015 (during which, he scored his second goal of the season, in a 3–0 win against St Mirren). Despite failing to challenge Celtic as a title contender, he, nevertheless, led the club to a second-place finish and again qualified for UEFA Europa League next season. Despite missing one match during the 2014–15 season, Reynolds had made forty–seven appearances and scoring three times in all competitions.

Ahead of the 2015–16 season, Reynolds remained as Aberdeen's vice–captain after Ryan Jack was appointed as the new captain. However, in the first leg of the UEFA Europa League's first qualifying round against KF Shkëndija, he suffered a shoulder injury and was substituted in the 69th minute, as the match ended in a 1–1 draw. After the match, it was announced that Reynolds would be out for three months. By October, he made his return to training. On 16 October 2015, Reynolds made his return to the starting line–up and played 45 minutes before being substituted, in a 2–0 loss against Ross County. Since returning from injury, he regained his first team place for the club's next six matches. This lasted until Reynolds suffered a broken nose against Heart of Midlothian on 12 December 2015 and was substituted at half–time, as Aberdeen won 1–0. After missing two matches with an injury, he returned to the starting line–up, in a 0–0 draw against Partick Thistle on 30 December 2015. However, in a match against Ross County on 17 January 2016, Reynolds received a straight red card in the 26th minute for a foul on Alex Schalk, in a 3–2 win. After serving a one match suspension, he returned to the starting line–up and helped the club win 2–1 on 3 February 2016. Following his return from suspension, Reynolds regained his first team place, maintaining his partnership with Taylor in the centre–back position. Despite expressing his optimism of Aberdeen becoming title contender once again, the club finished second place in the league for the second time in a row. At the end of the 2015–16 season, he went on to make twenty–four appearances in all competitions.

At the start of the 2016–17 season, Reynolds played all three matches in Aberdeen's matches in the UEFA Europa League that saw the club progress through to the third qualifying round of the tournament. However, he was unable to help Aberdeen overcome to beat NK Maribor after losing 2–1 on aggregate. Manager Derek McInnes hoped that Reynolds will be at his best after recovering from a shoulder injury. However in a match against Partick Thistle on 27 August 2016, he received a red card for a second bookable offence, in a 4–1 loss against Celtic. After missing two matches, Reynolds returned to the starting line–up, in a 2–1 win against Rangers on 25 September 2016. Since returning from suspension, he found himself behind the pecking order in the centre–back position behind Considine, Anthony O'Connor and Taylor. On 25 October 2016, Reynolds made his 400th appearance in his professional football career, in a 1–0 loss against Hamilton Academical. By November, he soon won his first team place, starting several matches for the club following the absence of Taylor. Reynolds appeared as an unused substitute against Celtic in the Scottish League Cup final, as Aberdeen loss 3–0. However by February, he suffered two injuries on two separate occasions that saw him out for two months. On 22 April 2017, Reynolds made his return from injury, starting the whole game, against Hibernian in the semi–finals of the Scottish Cup and helped the club win 3–2 to reach the Scottish Cup final. On 7 May 2017, he started the whole game to help Aberdeen beat Heart of Midlothian to finish second place in the league. In a follow–up match against Celtic, Reynolds captained the club for the first time this season, in a 3–1 loss. In the Scottish Cup final, he started the whole game, as Aberdeen loss 2–1. At the end of the 2016–17 season, Reynolds had made thirty–eight appearances in all competitions.

At the start of the 2017–18 season, Reynolds played all four matches in Aberdeen's matches in the UEFA Europa League that saw the club progress through to the third qualifying round of the tournament before being eliminated by Apollon Limassol. On 12 August 2017, he scored his first goal of the season, scoring from a volley, in a 2–1 win against Ross County. On 5 September 2017, Reynolds extended his contract with Aberdeen to the summer of 2019. To that date he had made 226 appearances and scored seven goals for the club. However, Reynolds found himself placed on the substitute bench, due to Kári Árnason and Scott McKenna being Aberdeen's first choice centre–backs. In the last game of the season, he started the match against Celtic and helped the club win 1–0 to finish second place in the league. At the end of the 2017–18 season, Reynolds had made twenty appearances and scored once in all competitions.

Ahead of the 2018–19 season, Reynolds underwent knee surgery in July 2018, requiring him to stop playing for the rest of the calendar year. It came after when he suffered the injury during Aberdeen's pre–season friendly match against Cove Rangers. On 13 January 2019, Reynolds made his return from injury, coming on as a second–half substitute, in a 2–0 win against Dibba Al Hisn. He later criticised playing on the artificial pitches and would not play in the condition, due to the injury he sustained earlier in the season. Reynolds left Aberdeen in January 2019, initially on loan, with McInnes stating that he wanted to go out on loan to get first team football.

=== Dundee United ===
On 31 January 2019, Reynolds moved to Dundee United on loan until the end of the 2018–19 season.

He made his debut for the club, starting the whole game as captain in absence of Fraser Fyvie, in a 2–1 win against Greenock Morton on 2 February 2019. However, Reynolds missed the next two matches, due to his refusal on the artificial pitches. On 26 February 2019, he made his return to the starting line–up against Inverness Caledonian Thistle as captain and helped Dundee United win 1–0. Following this, Reynolds became a first team regular as captain, forming a centre–back partnership with Mark Connolly. On 4 April 2019, he signed a pre-contract agreement with the club. Reynolds' first game after signing for Dundee United on a permanent basis came on 5 April 2019, in a 1–1 draw against Ross County. Shortly after, he was given all clear to play on the artificial pitches. Reynolds led the club to the Scottish Premiership play-offs' final after beating Inverness Caledonian Thistle in both legs and keeping three clean sheets along the way, including the first leg play-offs final against St Mirren. However in the return leg play-offs final, he started the whole game all the way to the penalty shootout following a 1–1 draw, as Dundee United went on to lose in a shootout. After the match, Reynolds said he's determined to help the club to get promoted to the Scottish Premiership. At the end of the 2018–19 season, Reynolds made eighteen appearances in all competitions. It was announced on 20 June 2019 that he signed a three-year contract with Dundee United.

At the start of the 2019–20 season, Reynolds continued to remain in the first team, maintaining his partnership with Connolly. He also retained his Dundee United's captaincy under the management of Robbie Neilson and helped the club maintain a good start to the season. Reynolds led Dundee United to keep five consecutive clean sheets between 26 October 2019 and 16 November 2019, including one against local rivals, Dundee. In a follow–up match against Alloa Athletic, he ended the club's five consecutive clean sheets when his header led to an own goal, in an eventual 2–1 win. By January, Reynolds was soon dropped from the starting line–up and was placed on the substitute bench. On 22 February 2020, he made his 500th career appearance, coming on as a late substitute, in a 2–1 win against Inverness Caledonian Thistle. But Reynolds made his return to the starting line–up, playing in the left–back position against Ayr United and Partick Thistle. However, the COVID-19 pandemic was curtailed, which saw Dundee United was promoted to the Scottish Premiership after leading the club to the Scottish Championship title. At the end of the 2019–20 season, he went on to make thirty–one appearances in all competitions. For his performance, Reynolds was named Ladbrokes Championship team of the season.

In the opening game of the 2020–21 season, Reynolds made his 50th appearance for Dundee United, in a 1–1 draw against St Johnstone. He scored his first goal for the club on 8 August 2020, in a 1–0 win away to his former club Motherwell. Since the start of the 2020–21 season, Reynolds continued to remain in the first team, maintaining his partnership with Connolly and Ryan Edwards. He also retained his Dundee United's captaincy under the management of Micky Mellon. In a match against St Mirren on 19 September 2020, Reynolds was at fault when his misplaced control of the ball led to Dylan Connolly scoring, though the club won 2–1. On 10 November 2020, against St Johnstone in the Scottish League Cup, he successfully converted the penalty in the shootout to help Dundee United win 4–3. Reynolds said he missed playing in front of crowds, saying: "One of the biggest things is…feeling that lift of the whole stadium losing it and you don't have that". Reynolds led the club to the semi–finals of the Scottish Cup, as they were eliminated by Hibernian.

At the start of the 2021–22 season, Reynolds captained three times for Dundee United; twice in the Scottish League Cup and once in the league. However, he soon lost his first team place, due to Edwards and Charlie Mulgrew being preferred as the club's first choice centre–backs. On 23 November 2021, Reynolds was replaced as captain by manager Tam Courts and was given to Edwards. On 14 January 2022, it was confirmed that he had left Dundee United in order to pursue his career elsewhere. By the time Reynolds left the club, he made four appearances in all competitions.

After leaving Dundee United, Reynolds spoke positively about manager Courts and rejected suggestions that he had a fallen out with him.

=== Cove Rangers ===
Following his release from Dundee United, Reynolds returned to Aberdeenshire, signing an 18-month contract with Scottish League One side Cove Rangers. He said: "I've been planning for some time to make the transition from full-time to part-time football. I'm grateful to get the chance to do that with a club as ambitious as Cove are. I'm really looking forward to working with them and taking on what I see as the next exciting chapter in my career. The move also allows me to concentrate on developing my other career as an engineer, I did all my qualifications while I was playing for Aberdeen. Even though I was born down in the central belt, Aberdeen is very much my home now."

He made his debut for the club the next day, coming on as a 68th-minute substitute, against Hibernian in the fourth round of the Scottish Cup and played all the way to extra time, as Cove Rovers went on to lose 1–0. Since joining the club, Reynolds became a first team regular, forming a centre–back partnership with Morgyn Neill and Scott Ross. On 13 March 2022, Reynolds scored his first goal for Cove Rangers, in a 4–1 win against Clyde. On 23 April 2022, he started the match against Dumbarton and helped the club win 1–0 to seal their promotion to the Scottish Championship. In the last game of the season against East Fife, Reynolds scored his second goal of the season, in a 3–2 win. At the end of the 2021–22 season, he went on to make sixteen appearances and scoring two times in all competitions.

At the start of the 2022–23 season, Reynolds scored an own goal in the group stage match of the Scottish League Cup against Albion Rovers, as Cove Rangers won 2–1. He continued to remain in the first team, maintaining his partnership with Neill and Ross in the centre–back position. On 17 September 2022, Reynolds scored a brace for the first time in his professional career, in a 2–2 draw against Partick Thistle. In a follow–up match against Raith Rovers in the Scottish Challenge Cup, he captained Cove Rangers for the first time, as the club went on to lose 1–0 and was eliminated from the tournament. After being dropped from the starting line–up for the next three league matches, Reynolds returned to the starting line–up, in a 1–0 loss against Inverness Caledonian Thistle. On 29 October 2022, he scored his third goal of the season, in a 4–4 draw against Hamilton Academical. After missing one match with an illness, Reynolds made his return to the starting line–up as captain, in a 2–2 draw against Raith Rovers on 14 January 2023. In the second half of the season, he alternated between the starting line–up and substitute bench. On the last game of the season against Greenock Morton, Reynolds started the whole game, in a 1–1 draw, which resulted in the club relegated back to Scottish League One. At the end of the 2022–23 season, Reynolds had made thirty–five appearances and scoring three times in all competitions. Following Cove Rangers' transition to a full-time operation, he stayed on at the club for another season, but remained as a part–time player.

At the start of the 2023–24 season, Reynolds scored his first goal of the season, in a 3–2 win against Brechin City in the group stage of the Scottish League Cup. After missing one match with an illness, he returned to the starting line–up, in a 3–2 win against Annan Athletic on 7 October 2023. This was followed up by helping Cove Rangers keeping four clean sheets between 28 October 2023 and 14 November 2023. After missing one match due to illness, Reynolds returned to the starting line–up as captain, in a 2–0 win against Stirling Albion in the third round of the Scottish Cup. Following this, he regained his first team place, maintaining his partnership with William Gillingham and in the centre–back position. However in a match against Annan Athletic on 24 February 2024, Reynolds suffered a facial knock and was substituted in the early first half, as the club won 1–0. After missing one match, he returned to the starting line–up, in a 1–0 loss against Falkirk on 5 March 2024. At the end of the 2023–24 season, Reynolds made thirty–seven appearances and scored once in all competitions.

On 29 May 2024, Reynolds was released by the club, along with Iain Vigurs.

=== Banks o' Dee ===
On 20 June 2024, Reynolds moved to the Highland League when he joined Banks o' Dee and joined up with Vigurs once again. Upon joining the club, Reynolds said: "I'm based in Aberdeen and settled here and the only playing experience I don't have up here is in the Highland League. Looking to the future, that's experience I want to get and there's no better place to do it at than Banks o' Dee."

He made his debut for the club, in a 2–0 win against Formartine United in the opening game of the season. On 10 August 2024, Reynolds scored his first goal for Banks o' Dee, in a 4–0 win against Nairn County. He was in the squad for the club, in a 1–0 win against Huntly to win the Aberdeenshire Cup. However, Reynolds suffered injuries on three separate occasions throughout the 2024–25 season. At the end of the 2024–25 season, he signed a contract with Banks o' Dee for another season.

In the 2025–26 season, Reynolds continued to remain involved in the first team at Banks o' Dee. However, he found him out of the first team on four occasions due to his work commitments. On 28 February 2026, Reynolds started the whole game against Formartine United in the semi–finals of the Highland League Cup, as the club lose 3–1 in a penalty shootout following a 1–1 draw, in what turned out to be his last game as a professional footballer. Shortly after the match, he announced his retirement from professional football with immediate effect.

== International career ==
In May 2006, Reynolds was called up to the Scotland U19 squad and appeared as an unused substitute twice that saw the under-19 team qualify for the UEFA European Under-19 Championship in Poland. He was then called up to the UEFA European Under-19 Championship squad. Reynolds made his only appearance of the tournament, in a 4–0 loss against Spain U19 on 20 July 2006. Scotland U19 went on to reach the UEFA European Under-19 Championship final, where the under–19 team lost 2–1. On 2 May 2007, he scored his first Scotland U19 goal, in a 3–1 win against Austria U19.

Reynolds represented Scotland at the 2007 FIFA U-20 World Cup in Canada when he was called up for the under–20 squad. Reynolds scored Scotland's U20 first goal, in a 2–1 loss against Costa Rica and was out of the tournament.

In January 2007, Reynolds was called up to the Scotland U21 squad for the first time. On 6 February 2007, he made his debut for the under-21 side, starting the whole game, in a 2–0 loss against Germany U21. In August 2007, Reynolds was called up to the Scotland U21 once again. He helped the under-21 side kept a clean sheet and was impressive throughout the match, in a 1–0 win against Czech Republic on 22 August 2007. Reynolds had made eight appearances for Scotland U21.

In April 2009, Reynolds was called up to the Scotland B squad for the first time. On 6 May 2009, he played once for the Scotland B side.

On 16 May 2014, Reynolds was called into the senior Scotland squad for the first time, for the friendly against Nigeria. He previously stated his determination to get call–up from the Tartan Army. Reynolds appeared as an unused substitute, in a 2–2 draw against Nigeria on 28 May 2014. Later in the year, he was called up to the Scotland's squad for the UEFA Euro 2016 qualifying on two separate occasions for the matches against Germany and Poland. In May 2015, Reynolds was called up to the Tartan Army's squad for the matches against Qatar and Republic of Ireland, but he did not play either of the matches. Reynolds acknowledged about getting a Scotland call–up, saying: "I was being brought in when the manager was carrying a 26-man or 27-man squad and, in terms of defenders, I was probably one of the last in. He cut back the squad by a couple of players for the last couple of games, and I dropped out. Before I got the first couple of call-ups you never knew how far away you were from the squad. He could have had a list of 30 defenders, and I could have been 30th on the list and I would never have known. It is nice to know I am a lot nearer the top than I maybe thought before." He was recalled to the squad for a 2018 FIFA World Cup qualifier against England in June 2017.

== Personal life ==
His father Brian is a former football player and current coach who has also worked at Motherwell as well as at Queen's Park, where his son joined in training sessions at Hampden Park as a child. Reynolds is the youngest of the three brothers.

Reynolds attended Our Lady's High School in Motherwell, where he passed his Higher examinations with five As. Reynolds revealed that he almost quit football when he was "accepted into almost every top university in Scotland." He was held up as an example to aspiring local footballers (such as future Aberdeen teammate Mikey Devlin who lived on the same street) for achieving academically as well as in sport. During his time at Motherwell, Reynolds has become involved in a project to encourage literacy. During the pandemic, Reynolds, Connolly, Calum Butcher and Dillon Powers were part of Dundee United's leadership group to help and monitor their teammates' well-being. The club were also placed their players (including Reynolds) on Furlough.

In June 2019, while still playing, Reynolds completed a degree course in mechanical and offshore engineering. Since playing part–time, he began working in a full-time job as a mechanical engineer with firm Katoni Engineering.

Reynolds is married and together, they have two children. They currently reside in Aberdeen, Scotland, due to his job.

== Career statistics ==
As of 31 December 2021

Appearances and goals by club, season and competition
Club	Season	League			National cup		League cup		Europe		Other		Total	
Club	Season	Division	Apps	Goals	Apps	Goals	Apps	Goals	Apps	Goals	Apps	Goals	Apps	Goals
Motherwell	2005–06	Scottish Premier League	1	0	0	0	0	0	0	0	0	0	1	0
Motherwell	2006–07	Scottish Premier League	35	2	3	0	3	0	0	0	0	0	41	2
Motherwell	2007–08	Scottish Premier League	38	0	3	0	3	0	0	0	0	0	44	0
Motherwell	2008–09	Scottish Premier League	36	0	3	0	1	0	2	0	0	0	42	0
Motherwell	2009–10	Scottish Premier League	37	4	1	0	2	0	6	0	0	0	46	4
Motherwell	2010–11	Scottish Premier League	19	0	1	0	2	0	6	0	0	0	22	0
Motherwell	Total		166	6	11	0	11	0	14	0	0	0	202	6
Sheffield Wednesday	2010–11	League One	7	0	1	0	0	0	0	0	0	0	8	0
Sheffield Wednesday	2011–12	League One	3	0	0	0	2	0	0	0	1	0	6	0
Sheffield Wednesday	2012–13	Championship	0	0	0	0	0	0	0	0	0	0	0	0
Sheffield Wednesday	Total		10	0	1	0	2	0	0	0	1	0	14	0
Aberdeen (loan)	2011–12	Scottish Premier League	16	0	5	0	0	0	0	0	0	0	21	0
Aberdeen (loan)	2012–13	Scottish Premier League	23	1	2	0	3	0	0	0	0	0	28	1
Aberdeen	2012–13	Scottish Premier League	12	0	1	0	0	0	0	0	0	0	13	0
Aberdeen	2013–14	Scottish Premiership	37	2	4	0	5	0	0	0	0	0	46	2
Aberdeen	2014–15	Scottish Premiership	37	2	1	0	3	0	6	1	0	0	47	3
Aberdeen	2015–16	Scottish Premiership	22	0	1	0	0	0	1	0	0	0	24	0
Aberdeen	2016–17	Scottish Premiership	26	0	4	0	3	0	5	0	0	0	38	0
Aberdeen	2017–18	Scottish Premiership	13	1	1	0	2	0	4	0	0	0	20	1
Aberdeen	2018–19	Scottish Premiership	0	0	0	0	0	0	0	0	0	0	0	0
Aberdeen	Total		147	5	12	0	13	0	16	1	0	0	188	6
Dundee United (loan)	2018–19	Scottish Championship	12	0	2	0	0	0	0	0	4 (Note: Appearances in the Scottish Premiership playoffs)	0	18	0
Dundee United	2019–20	Scottish Championship	26	0	1	0	4	0	0	0	0	0	31	0
Dundee United	2020–21	Scottish Premiership	34	1	4	0	3	0	0	0	0	0	41	1
Dundee United	2021–22	Scottish Premiership	1	0	0	0	4	0	0	0	0	0	5	0
Dundee United	Total		61	1	5	0	11	0	0	0	0	0	77	1
Career total			435	13	38	0	40	0	30	1	5	0	548	14

== Honours ==
Aberdeen

- Scottish League Cup: 2013–14; runner-up 2016–17
- Scottish Cup runner-up: 2016–17

Dundee United

- Scottish Championship: 2019–20

Cove Rangers

- Scottish League One: 2021–22

Individual

- SPL Young Player of the Month: April 2007
- PFA Scotland Team of the Year: 2013–14
- Aberdeen's Player of the Year: 2013–14
