= Semih Aydilek =

Footballer (born 1989)

Personal information
- Full name: Semih Aydilek
- Date of birth: 16 January 1989 (age 37)
- Place of birth: Frankfurt am Main, West Germany
- Height: 1.91 m (6 ft 3 in)
- Position: Forward

Youth career
- 199x–2007: Eintracht Frankfurt
- 2007–2008: Birmingham City

Senior career*
Years	Team	Apps	(Gls)
2008–2009	Birmingham City	0	(0)
2009	→ Motherwell (loan)	0	(0)
2009–2012	Kayserispor	24	(0)
2012–2014	Konyaspor	3	(0)
2015–2016	SpVgg 05 Oberrad		
2016	Hanauer SC		
2019–2020	Türk Gücü Friedberg	3	(0)

International career
2006	Turkey U17	4	(1)
2006	Turkey U18	2	(0)
2008	Germany U19	7	(3)
2008–2009	Germany U20	5	(2)
- * Club domestic league appearances and goals as of 4 October 2015

Semih Aydilek (born 16 January 1989) is a former professional footballer who played as a forward. Internationally, Aydilek represented Turkey, the country of his parents, at under-17 and under-18 level, but later chose to represent the country of his birth, and played for Germany at under-19 and under-20 level.

== Club career ==
=== Birmingham ===
Aydilek was born in Frankfurt am Main, Germany, to Turkish parents, and spent ten years in the youth system of home-town club Eintracht Frankfurt. While playing in a youth tournament in 2006, he was spotted by Terry Westley, youth academy manager at English club Birmingham City, who persuaded the player that a move to England would benefit his career. Aydilek agreed to join Birmingham, then in the Premier League, in October 2007, though the move could not be completed until his German passport came through in December. He played regularly with their reserve team, with whom he won the 2007–08 Birmingham Senior Cup. He was given a squad number prior to being named as a substitute for the League Cup defeat to Southampton in August 2008, but took no part in the game.

In February 2009, Aydilek joined Motherwell of the Scottish Premier League on loan for the remainder of the 2008–09 season, where he linked up with fellow loanee and Birmingham team-mate Artur Krysiak. Motherwell manager Mark McGhee had not seen the player, but signed him on the recommendation of his Birmingham counterpart, former Scotland national manager Alex McLeish, who felt he had potential but needed to play in competitive football to develop his game. He was an unused substitute in the SPL draw with Celtic in February 2009, but never appeared for the first team.

=== In Turkey ===
When his contract expired at the end of the 2008–09 season, Aydilek signed a four-year contract with Turkish club Kayserispor. An unused substitute in the opening game of the Süper Lig season, he made his debut in the next, on 16 August as a 76th-minute substitute in a 1–1 draw at home to Gaziantepspor. He made his first start for the club on 29 November as Kayserispor beat Manisaspor 1–0 away from home, and finished the season with 13 Süper Lig appearances, mostly as a substitute, without scoring. During the 2010–11 season, Aydilek made ten appearances for the Süper Lig side, four starts and six as a substitute.

=== Later career ===
In May 2016, while at German lower-league side Hanauer SC, received a 14-match ban.

== International career ==
Aydilek represented Turkey at under-17 and under-18 level while an Eintracht Frankfurt player. However, having received a German passport, he accepted a call-up to the German under-19 team in January 2008. He made his debut in a friendly against Poland under-19, and made a significant contribution to their qualification for the final stages of the 2008 UEFA under-19 championships. At the pre-tournament training camp, he suffered a severe tear to his ankle ligaments, so missed the final tournament which Germany went on to win, and was still recovering from the injury while his team-mates were in pre-season training at the start of the 2008–09 season.

In September 2008 he appeared for the German under-20 team, and, despite feeling pressure to commit to Turkey, he accepted selection for the German team to compete at the 2009 FIFA U-20 World Cup. In their opening game in the tournament, Aydilek was fouled to earn his side a penalty kick, which he converted himself to open the scoring in a 3–0 defeat of the United States. He scored the second goal of the final group game, a 3–0 defeat of Cameroon, but was sent off a few minutes later, which brought a suspension for the round of 16. Germany were eliminated in the quarter-finals by Brazil 2–1 after extra time; Aydilek missed a chance when one-on-one with the goalkeeper and set up the opening goal for Lewis Holtby, but had been substituted by the time Brazil equalised.

== Honours ==
Birmingham City

- Birmingham Senior Cup: 2008
