= Maroš Klimpl =

Slovak footballer

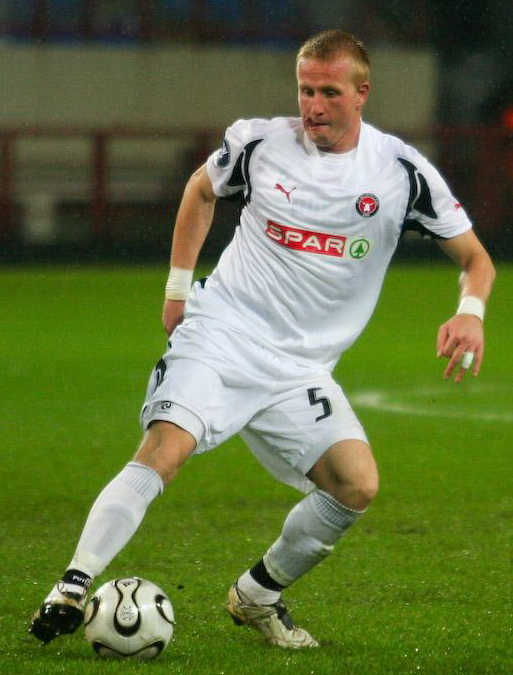

Personal information
- Full name: Maroš Klimpl
- Date of birth: 4 July 1980 (age 46)
- Place of birth: Martin, Czechoslovakia
- Height: 1.81 m (5 ft 11 in)
- Positions: Defensive midfielder; centre back

Team information
- Current team: FK Kolín

Youth career
- 1987–1997: Dolný Kubín

Senior career*
Years	Team	Apps	(Gls)
1997–1998	Ružomberok		
1998–1999	Banská Bystrica	15	(1)
1999–2001	Ružomberok	53	(0)
2001–2004	Viktoria Žižkov	66	(3)
2005–2007	Baník Ostrava	66	(2)
2007–2008	Midtjylland	14	(1)
2008–2009	→ Motherwell (loan)	21	(1)
2009–2010	Dundee FC	18	(0)
2010	Viktoria Žižkov	15	(0)
2011	Sloboda Sevojno	12	(0)
2011–2012	Aris Limassol	26	(1)
2013	Chomutov		
2014	Teplice	9	(0)
2014–	Kolín	2	(0)

International career^{‡}
2002–2007	Slovakia	19	(1)
- * Club domestic league appearances and goals as of 15 August 2014 ‡ National team caps and goals as of 15 August 2014

Maroš Klimpl (born 4 July 1980) is a Slovak professional footballer who plays as a midfielder for FK Kolín.

== Club career ==
Born in Martin, Slovakia, back then still part of Czechoslovakia, Klimpl played with Dukla Banská Bystrica and MFK Ružomberok for 6 seasons in the Slovak top tier before moving to the Czech Republic during the winter break of the 2001–02 season to join FK Viktoria Žižkov. The first two seasons with Viktoria were successful as they finished third in the Czech championship, however in the 2003–04 season they finished 15th and Klimpl moved to FC Baník Ostrava who had just been Czech champions in that season. He stayed in Ostrava three years and, although Baník failed to conquer the Czech championship in those years, they did win the Czech Cup in the first season Klimpl was with them.

In summer 2007, as an already established Slovak international, he left Czech Republic after six consecutive seasons in the Gambrinus liga, and joined Danish side FC Midtjylland. At the end of the 2007–08 season they finished runners-up in the Danish Superliga however Klimpl was loaned to Scottish Premier League side Motherwell F.C. for the next season. He adapted well in Scotland and in July 2009, he joined Football League Championship side Cardiff City on trial. On 31 August 2009, he agreed a deal to join Scottish First Division side Dundee. On 4 May 2010, he was informed along with 3 other players that he was no longer wanted and was free to look for another club. On 28 June 2010, it was announced that he has been released from his contract. He subsequently rejoined Viktoria Žižkov for the 2010/2011 season. In February 2011 after a successful trial Klimpl signed with Serbian club Sloboda Užice.

In summer 2011 he moved to Cyprus joining Aris Limassol. Next summer he returned to the Czech Republic and for a season and a half played with third-level side FC Chomutov. During the 2013–14 season winter break he moved to Gambrinus liga side FK Teplice. In summer 2014 he joined FK Kolín.

== International ==
He was member of the Slovak national football team between 2002 and 2007 and holds nineteen games and one goal.

== Honours ==
Banik Ostrava

- Czech Cup: 2005

Dundee FC

- Scottish Challenge Cup: 2009–10
