= Steven Meechan =

Scottish footballer

Personal information
- Date of birth: 30 March 1991 (age 35)
- Place of birth: Glasgow, Scotland
- Position: Midfielder

Team information
- Current team: Kilbirnie Ladeside

Youth career
- 2007–2009: Motherwell

Senior career*
Years	Team	Apps	(Gls)
2009–2011	Motherwell	4	(0)
2010	→ Albion Rovers (loan)	2	(0)
2011–2012	Kettering Town	20	(0)
2012–2013	Kirkintilloch Rob Roy		
2013–2014	Linlithgow Rose		
2014–	Kilbirnie Ladeside		
- * Club domestic league appearances and goals as of 21:50, 22 July 2014

Steven Meechan (born 30 March 1991) is a Scottish footballer who plays as a midfielder for Kilbirnie Ladeside in the Scottish Junior Football Association, West Region. He has previously played in the Scottish Premier League for Motherwell.

== Playing career ==
Signed by Motherwell for the 2007–08 season, Meechan played several matches for the team's U19s side, eventually earning a place on the Motherwell Reserves late on the same season. In 2008, he was awarded his first appearance in the first team line-up, but remained an unused substitute in that match. Three more of these games were to follow, Meechan was also an influential part of the Under 19s at Motherwell often captaining the side. He has also represented Scotland at under 17 and under 19 level.

His first team début in a league match (and his first start in a first team match) came in late 2009 under Jim Gannon, a narrow 3–2 defeat by Celtic at Fir Park. Since then, he made only 3 further appearances including coming on as a substitute in a 6–1 drubbing versus Rangers at Ibrox. On Tuesday 31 August 2010, Meechan, along with team-mates Peter Innes and Steven Lawless, agreed a six-month loan deal at Albion Rovers. Meechan made his first start for Rovers in a 1–0 win over East Stirlingshire on 2 October 2010, a win which meant the Rovers went top. Meechan got injured playing in his only other match for the club.

Despite Meechan's club manager, Paul Martin, indicating that agreement has been reached with Motherwell to extend the loan deals of Meechan, along with team-mates Innes and Lawless, until the end of the season, Meechan decided to turn down the chance to stay on at Rovers in favour of a return to Fir Park to impress new manager Stuart McCall.

On 1 June 2011, Meechan was released by Motherwell. On 26 July 2011, Meechan signed for Kettering Town.

Meechan cancelled his Kettering contract in February 2012 and eventually signed with Junior side Kirkintilloch Rob Roy in August that year. He moved on to East Superleague champions Linlithgow Rose in July 2013, before returning West to join Kilbirnie Ladeside a year later.
