= Paul Slane =

Scottish footballer and media personality

Personal information
- Full name: Paul Slane
- Date of birth: 25 November 1991 (age 34)
- Place of birth: Glasgow, Scotland
- Height: 5 ft 10 in (1.78 m)
- Position: Right midfielder

Youth career
- 2003–2009: Motherwell

Senior career*
Years	Team	Apps	(Gls)
2009–2010	Motherwell	3	(0)
2010–2013	Celtic	1	(0)
2012	→ Milton Keynes Dons (loan)	5	(0)
2012	→ Partick Thistle (loan)	4	(0)
2014–2015	Ayr United	12	(0)
2015–2016	Clyde	11	(0)
2022–2023	Broomhill	4	(0)

International career
2008	Scotland U17	5	(0)
- * Club domestic league appearances and goals as of 16:07, 24 June 2022 (UTC)

Paul Slane (born 25 November 1991) is a Scottish media personality and former professional footballer. He has played for Motherwell, Celtic, Partick Thistle, Milton Keynes Dons, Ayr United, Clyde and Broomhill. Slane also represented the Scotland under-17 team.

== Club career ==
=== Motherwell ===
Slane made his debut for Motherwell on 16 May 2009 in a league match at Hamilton Academical. He was an 86th-minute substitute during the 3–0 win.

Slane played in Motherwell's Europa League matches against Llanelli and Flamurtari in the summer of 2009, scoring the third goal in the 8–1 second round, second leg win over Flamurtari. Slane was a trainee at Motherwell, but refused to sign a contract. When he signed a contract with Celtic in February 2010, Slane was criticised by Motherwell chairman John Boyle for showing a lack of loyalty to the club.

=== Celtic ===
On 1 February 2010, Slane signed a four-year contract with Celtic. He made his reserve debut in a 4–1 win over Queen of the South's first team. Slane missed the entire 2010–11 season due to a cruciate ligament injury to his knee.

On 31 January 2012, Slane signed with English League One club Milton Keynes Dons on loan until the end of the season.

Slane made his SPL debut for Celtic on 18 August 2012, as a substitute against Ross County. He was loaned to Scottish First Division club Partick Thistle in October 2012.

After discussions with Celtic manager Neil Lennon, Slane was released from his contract in January 2013. Lennon stated, "...he was doing really well but he got a bad injury in a bounce game and that set him back for a while. He had loans at MK Dons and Partick Thistle but it didn't quite work out for him. With his talent it should have gone well but it didn't. It came to January and I told him he could stay on with our development side but he's better than that level. He had the option to stay or go and he decided to go." Lennon also added that Slane "... still has a bit of growing to do. He has to find his niche in life and the game. I really hope he finds that."

=== Ayr United ===
On 25 September 2014, Slane signed for Ayr United, having played in the club's previous two fixtures as a trialist. Slane was released by Ayr on 2 February 2015.

=== Clyde ===
Having already played twice for the club as a trialist, Slane signed for Clyde on 27 February 2015. Twenty minutes into Clyde's League Two match at Elgin City the following month, Slane was forced to come off as a result of eating a large amount of Mars bars on the coach journey up to the game. "Ten minutes in, I'm looking at him and he's just walking about," explained Clyde manager Barry Ferguson. "I'm thinking, 'What's up with this guy now?' He just looked across and said, 'I can't play'. I went mental." After he was substituted, the Elgin team doctor examined Slane and said he needed hospital treatment. Having sent the team home on the coach, Ferguson and his assistant Bob Malcolm picked up Slane (and Ross Fisher, who followed Slane to the hospital with a broken nose) in a rental car and drove them home at 2.00 am.

Slane's final career appearance occurred on 16 April 2016, a goalless home draw against East Fife. Immediately after coming on as a 74th-minute substitute, Slane asked the referee how long was left in the match. "I never heard that, but Bob heard it," said Barry Ferguson four years later, "and Bob never said anything to me until after the game. Bob says he's run on, he's run past the ref — he's not even been on for two minutes here — 'How long to go?' I would have taken him straight off." Slane explained: "I had taken co-codamol right before I went on, and when I was running I felt like I was running in slow motion. I remember thinking, 'I'm the final sub here; there's nobody who can come on for me.'"

=== Open Goal Broomhill ===
After six years of retirement, during which he began a career as a media personality with Open Goal, Slane returned to football to play for their new side, Lowland League club Open Goal Broomhill, on a one-year deal under manager and fellow Open Goal podcaster Simon Ferry.

== Media career ==
In 2019, Slane began appearing in videos for Open Goal's YouTube channel, and would soon become a regular to the channel, having previously appeared in the channel's podcast Keeping the Ball on the Ground, along with his former Celtic teammate Simon Ferry, Kevin Kyle and Andy Halliday. Open Goal has received a large cult following in Scotland, and won 'Best Podcast' at the 2019 Football Blogging Awards. Slane has received praise for his 'maverick' personality, earning a cult following of his own as a "horny winger".

== Personal life ==
A couple of months after leaving Celtic with a £10,000 pay-off, Slane appeared in the Scottish tabloid press as a result of a four-day bender in Amsterdam with friends. Compromising pictures of him appeared on Twitter which he initially claimed were faked but later admitted were real. Slane had initially intended to spend his pay-off from Celtic to fund a hip operation, but ended spending most of it on nights out and the trip to Amsterdam.

In 2017, he had been on the dole and delivering parcels with a friend around Lanark. "There was a forest there with caravans, and I used to say to him, 'Drop me off there. You deliver the parcels and I'll meet you back here'. So I used to just sit there, enjoying the nature, and always prayed that people came out of the caravans, just so that I could talk to somebody." While there, Slane received a call from Simon Ferry, who asked if he wanted to join the Keeping the Ball on the Ground podcast. "My mate came back, and I was partying in his van on the way home, going wild."
