= Sebastian Kosiorowski =

Polish footballer

Personal information
- Date of birth: 21 May 1990 (age 36)
- Place of birth: Kolbuszowa, Poland
- Height: 1.97 m (6 ft 6 in)
- Position: Goalkeeper

Team information
- Current team: Germania Wernigerode

Youth career
- Kolbuszowianka Kolbuszowa
- –2004: Orły Rzeszów
- 2004–2006: Stal Mielec

Senior career*
Years	Team	Apps	(Gls)
2006–2008	Korona Kielce	0	(0)
2008–2010	Motherwell	0	(0)
2010–2011	Jagiellonia Białystok	0	(0)
2011	Garbarnia Kraków	0	(0)
2011–2012	LKS Mogilany	12	(0)
2012	Górnik Wieliczka	8	(1)
2012–2013	Sandecja Nowy Sącz	0	(0)
2013–2014	Helmond Sport	2	(0)
2014–2015	Korona Kielce	1	(0)
2014–2015	Korona Kielce II	9	(0)
2020	Gwarek Ornontowice	0	(0)
2023	KS Kutno	5	(0)
2023	→ Zryw Wygoda (loan)	5	(0)
2023–2024	Marcovia 2000 Marki	14	(0)
2024	LKS Chlebnia	13	(0)
2024–	Germania Wernigerode	0	(0)
- * Club domestic league appearances and goals as of 18 August 2024

Sebastian Kosiorowski (born 21 May 1990) is a Polish professional footballer who plays as a goalkeeper for German club Germania Wernigerode.

== Career ==
Kosiorowski started his senior career with Korona Kielce in 2006. In the summer of 2008, he joined Scottish side Motherwell. He left the club in mid-2010 without making a single appearance.

After returning to Poland, Kosiorowski held short spells at Jagiellonia Białystok, Garbarnia Kraków, LKS Mogilany, Górnik Wieliczka, and Sandecja Nowy Sącz.

In 2013, he signed for Helmond Sport in the Dutch Eerste Divisie and made two appearances. On 24 January 2014, he re-signed with Korona Kielce. After leaving the club in June 2015, he trialed with several teams, but remained a free agent until 2020, when he joined Gwarek Ornontowice.

Kosiorowski took another break in his career in 2020 and returned to professional football in February 2023 after joining IV liga club KS Kutno.

On 4 August 2023, he signed with Marcovia 2000 Marki.
