= List of twin teammates in sports =

This is a list of notable people who played team sports on the same team as their twin (identical or fraternal) at some point in their career, generally above the youth sports level.

The matching career paths play into a trope of a bond between twins that starts with their shared time before birth.

== Doubles and tandems ==
Names	Identical?	Year of birth	Nationality	Sport	Source
Maryna and Vladyslava Aleksiyiva		2001	Ukraine	Synchronised swimming	
Herbert and Wilfred Baddeley		1872	United Kingdom	Tennis	
Antonia and Ferdinand Becherer	No	1963	West Germany	Ice dancing	
Bob and Mike Bryan (the Bryan brothers)	Yes	1978	United States	Tennis	
Bregje and Noortje de Brouwer		1999	Netherlands	Synchronised swimming	
Bia and Branca Feres	Yes	1988	Brazil	Synchronised swimming	
Tim and Tom Gullikson	Yes	1951	United States	Tennis	
Pavol and Peter Hochschorner		1979	Slovakia	Canoe slalom	
Jiang Tingting and Jiang Wenwen		1986	China	Synchronised swimming	
Karen and Sarah Josephson		1964	United States	Synchronised swimming	
Daniela and Sandra Klemenschits		1982	Austria	Tennis	
Bernd and Jörg Landvoigt		1951	East Germany	Coxless pair rowing	
Paula Andrea and María Paulina Pérez		1996	Colombia	Tennis	
Karolina and Kristýna Plíšková	Yes	1992	Czech Republic	Tennis	
Sanchai and Sonchat Ratiwatana		1982	Thailand	Tennis	
Ivan and Matej Sabanov		1992	Serbia	Tennis	
Pavel and Petr Štercl		1966	Czech Republic	Canoe slalom	
Wang Liuyi and Wang Qianyi		1997	China	Synchronised swimming	

== Team sports ==
Names	Identical?	Year of birth	Nationality	Sport	Team(s)	Source
Zaquan Adha and Aidil Zafuan	Yes	1987	Malaysia	Association football	Armed Forces F.C., Johor Darul Ta'zim F.C., Negeri Sembilan FC	
Stanislav and Yaroslav Alshevsky		1991	Russia	Ice hockey	HC Neftekhimik Nizhnekamsk, Admiral Vladivostok, Kunlun Red Star	
Halil and Hamit Altıntop	Yes	1982	Turkey	Association football	FC Schalke 04, SG Wattenscheid 09	
Archil and Shota Arveladze		1973	Georgia	Association football	FC Dinamo Tbilisi, Trabzonspor	
Ronde and Tiki Barber	Yes	1975	United States	American football	Virginia Cavaliers	
Diego and Diogo Barcelos	Yes	1985	Brazil	Association football	SC Internacional	
Guillermo and Gustavo Barros Schelotto		1973	Argentina	Association football	Boca Juniors, Gimnasia La Plata	
Alec and Eric Bedser	Yes	1918	England	Cricket	Surrey County Cricket Club	
Lars and Sven Bender		1989	Germany	Association football	Bayer Leverkusen	
Aleksei and Vasili Berezutski	Yes	1982	Russia	Association football	CSKA Moscow	
Unni and Åse Birkrem		1966	Norway	Handball	IK Våg, Kristiansand IF	
Alex and Kate Blackwell	Yes	1983	Australia	Cricket	New South Wales Breakers	
Cameron and Cayden Boozer	No	2007	United States	Basketball	Duke Blue Devils	
François and Gilles Brisson		1958	France	Association football	Paris Saint-Germain	
Chase and Sydney Brown	Yes	2000	Canada	American football	Illinois Fighting Illini	
Daniel and Josh Bullocks	Yes	1983	United States	American football	Nebraska Cornhuskers	
Heather and Heidi Burge	Yes	1971	United States	Basketball	Virginia Cavaliers	
George and Tom Burgess		1992	England	Rugby league	South Sydney Rabbitohs	
Chris and Nicky Cadden		1996	Scotland	Association football	Hibernian F.C.	
Dick and Ian Campbell		1953	Scotland	Association football	Brechin City F.C., Dunfermline Athletic F.C.	
Jose and Ozzie Canseco	Yes	1964	Cuba	Baseball	Huntsville Stars, Laredo Broncos, Newark Bears, Oakland Athletics, Yuma Scorpions	
Jose and Ozzie Canseco	Yes	1964	United States	Baseball	Huntsville Stars, Laredo Broncos, Newark Bears, Oakland Athletics, Yuma Scorpions	
Delphine and Estelle Cascarino		1997	France	Association football	OL Lyonnes	
Keith and Kerry Cash	Yes	1969	United States	American football	Texas Longhorns	
Haley and Hanna Cavinder	No	2001	United States	Basketball	Fresno State Bulldogs, Miami Hurricanes	
Adam and James Chambers		1980	England	Association football	West Bromwich Albion, Walsall	
Stan and Stew Cliburn	Yes	1956	United States	Baseball	Buffalo Bisons, Edmonton Trappers, Southern Miss Golden Eagles	
Jarron and Jason Collins	Yes	1978	United States	Basketball	Stanford Cardinal	
Chris and Paul Dawson		1948	Australia	Rugby league	Newtown Jets	
Frank and Ronald de Boer		1970	Netherlands	Association football	Ajax, Al-Rayyan, Al-Sbamal, Barcelona, Rangers	
Dennis and Gérard de Nooijer		1969	Netherlands	Association football	Sparta Rotterdam, SC Heerenveen, FC Dordrecht	
David and Philipp Degen		1983	Switzerland	Association football	FC Basel	
Jorge and Julio Dely Valdés		1967	Panama	Association football		
Brandon and Brian Dixon	Yes	1990	United States	American football	Northwest Missouri State Bearcats	
Lukáš and Tomáš Došek		1978	Czech Republic	Association football	FC Viktoria Plzeň, SK Slavia Prague	
Caden and Taco Dowler		2003	United States	American football	Montana State Bobcats	
Henrico and Jeroen Drost		1987	Netherlands	Association football	SC Heerenveen	
James and Jason Dunn		1971	United States	Association football	Seattle Sounders	
Todd and Troy Dusosky		1976	United States	Indoor soccer	Cleveland Crunch, Milwaukee Wave	
Marshall and Mike Edwards	Yes	1952	United States	Baseball	Los Angeles City Cubs, UCLA Bruins	
José and Vinicio Espinal		1982	Dominican Republic	Association football		
José and Vinicio Espinal		1982	Italy	Association football		
Mat and Max Feagai	Yes	2001	New Zealand	Rugby league	St. George Illawarra Dragons	
Matthew and Steven Febey		1969	Australia	Australian rules football	Melbourne	
Chris and Peter Ferraro		1973	United States	Ice hockey	Atlanta Knights, Binghamton Rangers, DEG Metro Stars, Las Vegas Wranglers, Maine Black Bears, New York Rangers, Pittsburgh Penguins, Portland Pirates, Providence Bruins, Södertälje SK, Springfield Falcons, Syracuse Crunch, Washington Capitals	
Daniel and Paco Figueroa	Yes	1983	Spain	Baseball	Bowie Baysox, Miami Hurricanes	
Daniel and Paco Figueroa	Yes	1983	United States	Baseball	Bowie Baysox, Miami Hurricanes	
Antonio and Emanuele Filippini		1973	Italy	Association football	Brescia Calcio, Ospitaletto, Palermo FC, SS Lazio, Treviso, Livorno	
Javier and Miguel Flaño		1984	Spain	Association football	CA Osasuna	
Blake and Eric Frohnapfel		1992	United States	American football	Marshall Thundering Herd	
Ramiro and Rogelio Funes Mori	Yes	1991	Argentina	Association football	Club Atlético River Plate	
Paul and Ron Futcher		1956	England	Association football	Chester City, Luton Town, Manchester City, Barnsley	
Gary and Paul Gait		1967	Canada	Lacrosse	Detroit Turbos, Philadelphia Wings, Syracuse Orangemen, Washington Power	
Bernardo and Francisco Gomes		2004	Portugal	Association football	Marítimo	
Chris and James Gowans		1977	Australia	Australian rules football	Central District Bulldogs	
Joey and Stephen Graham		1982	United States	Basketball	Oklahoma State Cowboys, UCF Golden Knights	
Harvey and Horace Grant	Yes	1965	United States	Basketball	Clemson Tigers	
Marcus and Michael Griffin	No	1985	United States	American football	Texas Longhorns	
Shaquem and Shaquill Griffin	Yes	1995	United States	American football	UCF Knights, Seattle Seahawks	
Adam and Joel Griffiths		1979	Australia	Association football	Newcastle Jets FC	
Ray and Roy Grimes		1893	United States	Baseball	Bridgeport Americans, Columbus Senators, Durham Bulls	
Arnar and Bjarki Gunnlaugsson		1973	Iceland	Association football		
Aaron and Andrew Harrison		1994	United States	Basketball	Kentucky Wildcats	
Hossam and Ibrahim Hassan		1966	Egypt	Association football		
Hayden and Hogan Hatten	Yes	2000	United States	American football	Idaho Vandals	
David and Dean Holdsworth		1968	England	Association football	Watford, Bolton Wanderers	
Karen and Sara Holmgaard		1999	Denmark	Association football	Fortuna Hjørring, Turbine Potsdam, Everton	
Jess and Sarah Hosking	Yes	1995	Australia	Australian rules football	Carlton Football Club, Richmond Football Club	
Tomislav and Zvonimir Ivišić		2003	Croatia	Basketball	Šibenka, Studentski centar, Illinois Fighting Illini	
David and Peter Jackson		1937	England	Association football	Wrexham, Bradford City, Tranmere Rovers	
Duan and Marco Jansen		2000	South Africa	Cricket	North West	
Ignacio and Juan Jeraldino		1995	Chile	Association football	Unión San Felipe	
Martin and Michael Johansen		1972	Denmark	Association football	F.C. Copenhagen	
Bubber and Claude Jonnard	Yes	1897	United States	Baseball	Fort Worth Cats, Nashville Volunteers, Talladega Tigers	
Dora and Larissa Kalaus	Yes	1996	Croatia	Handball	Lokomotiva Zagreb, Podravka Koprivnica	
Laura and Orlane Kanor	Yes	1997	France	Handball	Metz Handball, Rapid București	
Arman and Artavazd Karamyan		1979	Armenia	Association football		
Alby and Lukas Kelly-Heald		2005	New Zealand	Association football	Wellington Phoenix FC	
Gözde and Özge Kırdar		1985	Turkey	Volleyball		
Michael and Nigel Kol		1962	Australia	Australian rules football	Geelong	
Gianluca and Raffael Korte	Yes	1990	Germany	Association football	Eintracht Braunschweig, SV Waldhof Mannheim, TuS Mechtersheim	
Erwin and Helmut Kremers		1949	West Germany	Association football	Borussia Mönchengladbach, Kickers Offenbach, FC Schalke 04	
Ali and Qassem Lajami	Yes	1996	Saudi Arabia	Association football	Al Fateh, Al-Khaleej	
Jocelyne and Monique Lamoureux		1989	United States	Ice hockey		
Darjuš and Kšyštof Lavrinovič		1979	Lithuania	Basketball	Lietkabelis, SkyCop Prienai, UNICS Kazan, Vytis, London City Royals	
Li Guangwen and Li Shangwen		1992	China	Association football		
Li Long and Li Qiang		1998	China	Association football	Yanbian Funde, Yanbian Longding	
Jacqui and Skylar Little	Yes	1978	United States	Association football	Washington Freedom	
Liu Huan and Liu Le		1989	China	Association football	Anhui Jiufang, Shenyang Zhongze	
Lo Chih-an and Lo Chih-en		1988	Taiwan	Association football	Tatung F.C.	
Brook and Robin Lopez	Yes	1988	United States	Basketball	Stanford Cardinal, Milwaukee Bucks	
Alistair and Stewart Lord	Yes	1940	Australia	Australian rules football	Geelong	
Katrine Lunde and Kristine Lunde-Borgersen	Yes	1980	Norway	Handball	Aalborg DH, Viborg HK, Vipers Kristiansand	
Henrik and Joel Lundqvist		1982	Sweden	Ice hockey	Västra Frölunda	
Hamish and James Marshall	Yes	1979	New Zealand	Cricket	Northern Districts	
Caleb and Cody Martin	No	1995	United States	Basketball	Charlotte Hornets, NC State Wolfpack, Nevada Wolf Pack	
Tristin and Zyon McCollum	Yes	1999	United States	American football	Sam Houston State Bearkats	
Devin and Jason McCourty	Yes	1987	United States	American football	Rutgers Scarlet Knights, New England Patriots	
Pamela and Paula McGee	Yes	1962	United States	Basketball	USC Trojans, Dallas Diamonds	
Marlin and Mike McKeever		1940	United States	American football	USC Trojans	
Pat and Paul McQuistan	Yes	1983	United States	American football	Weber State Wildcats	
Elissa and Ibrahim Meer		1967	United Arab Emirates	Association football	Sharjah FC	
Coco and Kelly Miller		1978	United States	Basketball	Georgia Lady Bulldogs, Atlanta Dream	
Damon and Ryan Minor	No	1974	United States	Baseball	Oklahoma Sooners	
Aleksei and Anton Miranchuk		1995	Russia	Association football	Lokomotiv Moscow	
A.J. and C.J. Moore	Yes	1995	United States	American football	Ole Miss Rebels	
Kazuyuki and Kōji Morisaki		1981	Japan	Association football		
Brett and Josh Morris		1986	Australia	Rugby league		
Marcus and Markieff Morris	No	1989	United States	Basketball	Kansas Jayhawks, Phoenix Suns	
Roddery and Rolddy Muñoz	Yes	2000	Dominican Republic	Baseball	Augusta GreenJackets, Dominican Summer League Braves, Rome Braves	
Gabriel and Grayson Murphy	Yes	2000	United States	American football	North Texas Mean Green, UCLA Bruins	
Jacob and Josh Murphy		1995	England	Association football	Norwich City	
Keegan and Kris Murray	Yes	2000	United States	Basketball	Iowa Hawkeyes	
Manuel and Nuno Namora	Yes	1998	Portugal	Association football	Rio Ave	
Rio and Riri Noro	No	2004	Japan	Ice hockey	Japan women's national ice hockey team, Daishin IHC	
Kévynn and Olivier Nyokas		1986	France	Handball	Paris HB	
Kévynn and Olivier Nyokas		1986	DR Congo	Handball	Paris HB	
Eddie and Johnny O'Brien	Yes	1930	United States	Baseball	Seattle Chieftains, Pittsburgh Pirates	
Becky and Jessie O'Donohue	Yes	1980	United States	Basketball	Niagara Purple Eagles	
Amanda and Tess Oliveira		1987	Brazil	Water polo		
Edu and Joan Oriol		1986	Spain	Association football		
Flávio and Marco Paixão		1984	Portugal	Association football	Hamilton Academical, Śląsk Wrocław, Lechia Gdańsk	
Ashley and Courtney Paris		1987	United States	Basketball	Oklahoma Sooners	
Maksym and Pavel Pashayev		1988	Ukraine	Association football	Dnipro Dnipropetrovsk	
Maksym and Pavel Pashayev		1988	Azerbaijan	Association football	Dnipro Dnipropetrovsk	
Blake and Logan Pietila	Yes	2000	United States	Ice hockey	Michigan Tech Huskies	
Elisabeth and Patricia Pinedo		1981	Spain	Handball		
Paula and Stela Posavec		1996	Croatia	Handball		
Maurkice and Mike Pouncey	Yes	1989	United States	American football	Florida Gators	
Antonio and Simón Ramírez		1998	Chile	Association football	Universidad de Concepción	
Andreas and Thomas Ravelli		1959	Sweden	Association football	Östers IF, IFK Göteborg	
Jonathan and Simon Richter	Yes	1985	Denmark	Association football	Nordsjælland	
Jonathan and Simon Richter	Yes	1985	Gambia	Association football	Nordsjælland	
Taylor and Tyler Rogers	Yes	1990	United States	Baseball	San Francisco Giants	
Leonardo and Maxi Rolón		1995	Argentina	Association football	Arsenal de Sarandí	
Ángel and Óscar Romero		1992	Paraguay	Association football	Cerro Porteño, San Lorenzo	
François and Maurice Rozenthal	Yes	1975	France	Ice hockey	Corsaires de Dunkerque, Gothiques d'Amiens, Hockey Club de Reims, IF Björklöven, LHC Les Lions, Pingouins de Morzine-Avoriaz	
Rex and Rob Ryan	No	1962	United States	American football	Southwestern Oklahoma State Bulldogs	
Jesús and José Sagredo		1994	Bolivia	Association football	Club Blooming, Club Bolívar	
Daniel and Jacob Saifiti	Yes	1996	Australia	Rugby league	Newcastle Knights	
Borja and Fede San Emeterio	Yes	1997	Spain	Association football	Racing de Santander, Sevilla Atlético	
Rich and Ron Saul	Yes	1948	United States	American football	Michigan State Spartans	
Andy and Walt Schmetzer		1967	United States	Indoor soccer	Cleveland Force, Tacoma Stars	
Brad and Chris Scott	Yes	1976	Australia	Australian rules football	Brisbane Lions	
Daniel and Henrik Sedin	Yes	1980	Sweden	Ice hockey	Modo Hockey, Vancouver Canucks	
Anthony and David Semerad		1991	Australia	Basketball		
Anthony and David Semerad		1991	Philippines	Basketball		
Kato and Wasswa Serwanga	Yes	1976	Uganda	American football	Pacific Tigers, Sacramento State Hornets	
Kato and Wasswa Serwanga	Yes	1976	United States	American football	Pacific Tigers, Sacramento State Hornets	
Sphumelele and Thubelihle Shamase	Yes	2002	South Africa	Association football	UJ Ladies, FC Gintra	
Joe and Red Shannon		1897	United States	Baseball	Asbury Park Sea Urchins, Boston Braves, Columbus Senators	
Fabio and Rafael da Silva		1990	Brazil	Association football	Manchester United	
Hrvoje and Ivan Smolčić	Yes	2000	Croatia	Association football	Rijeka	
Sanna Solberg-Isaksen and Silje Solberg-Østhassel		1990	Norway	Handball		
Sun Ji and Sun Xiang	Yes	1982	China	Association football	Shanghai Shenhua F.C.	
Patrik and Peter Sundström		1961	Sweden	Ice hockey	IF Björklöven, New Jersey Devils	
Rich and Ron Sutter		1963	Canada	Ice hockey	Lethbridge Broncos, Philadelphia Flyers, Red Deer Rustlers, St. Louis Blues	
Charles and Philip Tabet	Yes	1987	Lebanon	Basketball	South Alabama Jaguars	
Charles and Philip Tabet	Yes	1987	United States	Basketball	South Alabama Jaguars	
Tang Miao and Tang Xin		1990	China	Association football	Chengdu Rongcheng F.C.	
Kenny and Yordi Teijsse	Yes	1992	Netherlands	Association football	Amsterdamsche FC	
Carl and Charles Thomas		1969	United States	Basketball	Eastern Michigan Eagles	
Jurriën and Quinten Timber	Yes	2001	Netherlands	Association football	Jong Ajax	
Borislav and Radoslav Tsonev		1995	Bulgaria	Association football	Levski Sofia	
Dick and Tom Van Arsdale		1943	United States	Basketball	Indiana Hoosiers, Phoenix Suns	
René and Willy van de Kerkhof	Yes	1951	Netherlands	Association football	Twente, PSV Eindhoven	
Zlatko and Zoran Vujović		1958	Yugoslavia	Association football	Bordeaux, Cannes, Nice	
Darryl and Shane Wakelin	Yes	1974	Australia	Australian rules football	St Kilda Football Club	
Ray and Rod Wallace		1969	England	Association football	Leeds United, Southampton	
Kerrod and Kevin Walters		1967	Australia	Rugby league	Brisbane Broncos	
Mark and Steve Waugh		1965	Australia	Cricket	New South Wales	
Lilli and Luisa Welcke	Yes	2002	Germany	Ice hockey	Germany women's national ice hockey team, Boston University Terriers, Maine Black Bears	
Emelie and Johanna Westberg		1990	Sweden	Handball	Skuru IK, Nykøbing HK	
Alan and Gary Whetton		1959	New Zealand	Rugby union	All Blacks	
Cristian and Damiano Zenoni		1977	Italy	Association football	Atalanta, Pistolese	
Marcin and Michał Żewłakow		1976	Poland	Association football	Polonia Warsaw, KSK Beveren, Royal Excelsior Mouscron	

In 2024 MLB published a list of ten sets of twins who had both reached Major League Baseball, four of those pairs as teammates.

== Other twins in sports ==
Footballers who did not necessarily play for the same club as teammates:

- Cristián and Iván Álvarez (1980–)
- Carlos and Hernán Alzamora (1986–)
- José and Martín Belforti (1981–)
- Mikhail and Vladimir Beschastnykh (1974–)
- Edison and Jonathan Bilbao (1987–)
- Franco and Pablo Calderón (1998–)
- José Maria and Juan Miguel "Juanmi" Callejón (1987–)
- Cui Qi and Cui Lin (1997–)
- Fernando and Patricio D'Amico (1975–)
- José and Vinicio Espinal (1982–)
- Juan and Luis Fuentes (1995–)
- Suzanne and Shelley Grant (1984–)
- Emilio and Javi Guerra (1982–)
- Cristián and Diego Gutiérrez (1997–)
- Michael and Will Keane (1993–)
- Germán and Gustavo Lanaro (1986–)
- Robby and Ross McCrorie (1998–)
- Donnie and Ronnie McKinnon (1940–)
- Federico and Salomón Obama (2000–)
- Diego and Matías Plaza (2001–)
- Ebbe and Peter Sand (1972–)
- Hisato and Yūto Satō (1982–)
- André and Anderson Silva (1997–)
- Romário and Ronaldo Vieira (1998–)
- Nicolás and Santiago Villafañe (1988–)
- Martín and Matías Zbrun (1985–)

Twins in other sports who were not teammates as professionals:

- Brett and Garrett Festerling (1986–) (ice hockey)
- Nathan and Ryan Lonie (1983–) (Australian rules football)
- Devon and Ricardo McDonald (1969–) (American football)
- Callum and Matt Parkinson (1996–) (cricket)
- Adam and Troy Selwood (1984–) (Australian rules football)

== See also ==
- For twins who competed in individual sports, see List of twins.
- List of triplets includes several sets who participated in sports, both individually and together.
