= Jeraldino =

Jeraldino is a surname. Notable people with the surname include:

- Ignacio Jeraldino (born 1995), Chilean footballer
- Juan Jeraldino (born 1995), Chilean footballer
