= Kieran Kennedy =

English footballer (born 1993)

Personal information
- Full name: Kieran James Kennedy
- Date of birth: 23 September 1993 (age 33)
- Place of birth: Manchester, England
- Height: 6 ft 0 in (1.83 m)
- Position: Defender

Youth career
- 2000–2014: Manchester City
- 2013–2014: → Leicester City (loan)
- 2014–2015: Leicester City

Senior career*
Years	Team	Apps	(Gls)
2015–2017	Motherwell	22	(0)
2017	AFC Fylde	2	(0)
2017–2018	Macclesfield Town	32	(1)
2018–2019	Shrewsbury Town	1	(0)
2019	Wrexham	12	(2)
2019–2020	Port Vale	1	(0)
2019–2020	→ Wrexham (loan)	16	(1)
2020–2021	York City	7	(0)
2021	Macclesfield	3	(0)
2021–2022	Stockport Town	13	(0)

International career
2011	England U19	7	(0)
- * Club domestic league appearances and goals as of 12:01, 27 December 2021 (UTC)

Kieran James Kennedy (born 23 September 1993) is an English former professional footballer who played as a defender. He is the grandson of Paddy Kennedy.

A former England under-19 international, he began his career in the academies at Manchester City and Leicester City before signing with Scottish Premiership side Motherwell in July 2015. He left the club to join AFC Fylde in March 2017 before moving on to Macclesfield Town four months later. He won the National League title with Macclesfield during the 2017–18 season and was bought by Shrewsbury Town in June 2018. He failed to break into the first team with Shrewsbury, however, and was allowed to sign with Wrexham in January 2019 before he returned to the English Football League with Port Vale in June 2019. However, he returned to Wrexham on loan in November 2019. Port Vale released him, and he went on to sign with York City in August 2020, Macclesfield in June 2021 and then Stockport Town in September 2021.

== Club career ==
=== Early career ===
Kennedy started his career at Manchester City and spent a total of 14 years at the club's Academy. He was given the squad number 54 by manager Roberto Mancini for the 2012–13 season. He joined Leicester City on loan during the 2013–14 season, mainly playing in their under-21 squad, before he was signed by manager Nigel Pearson permanently in the summer. He was released by Leicester after the "Foxes" retained their Premier League place at the end of the 2014–15 season.

=== Motherwell ===
Kennedy initially joined Motherwell on a trial basis, but impressed in pre-season games against Borussia Mönchengladbach and SC Heerenveen to convince boss Ian Baraclough to sign him on a two-year deal on 16 July 2015; in doing so Kennedy rejected the offer of a trial game at Southend United. Kennedy made his first-ever start in competitive football in the Scottish League Cup, in a 3–1 extra time win at East Fife on 25 August. He made his first league start four days later, in a 1–0 victory over Kilmarnock at Fir Park. Stephen McManus remained first-choice centre-back under new manager Mark McGhee, whilst Kennedy competed with Louis Laing and Ben Hall to play alongside him. He went on to feature 25 times for the "Well" during the 2015–16 season, helping the club to a fifth-place finish in the Scottish Premiership. However, after struggling with illness and injuries, he did not make a first-team appearance during the 2016–17 campaign. He left the club by mutual consent in March 2017 after he asked to leave the "Steelmen" to find first-team football elsewhere.

=== AFC Fylde ===
On 23 March 2017, Kennedy returned to England and joined National League North side AFC Fylde. He made two substitute appearances for Dave Challinor's "Coasters" as Fylde secured promotion as league champions at the end of the 2016–17 season.

=== Macclesfield Town ===
On 21 July 2017, Kennedy signed a one-year contract with National League side Macclesfield Town after impressing during a trial game against Derby County. He scored his first competitive goal in a 2–0 win at Chester City on 28 August. He helped the "Silkmen" to keep a total of 14 clean sheets in his 35 appearances as Macclesfield won promotion to the English Football League as champions of the National League in 2017–18. Manager John Askey said that "it took us about six months to get him properly fit because he had been out ill for six months, but once he was fit he was a completely different player who has got a lot of ability".

=== Shrewsbury Town ===
On 10 June 2018, Kennedy followed John Askey out of Moss Rose and signed for League One side Shrewsbury Town on a one-year deal; Shrewsbury paid Macclesfield an undisclosed fee. He left the New Meadow after being released on 10 January 2019 as new "Shrews" manager Sam Ricketts preferred Mat Sadler, Omar Beckles and Luke Waterfall ahead of him.

=== Wrexham ===
On 10 January 2019, Kennedy signed a six-month contract with Wrexham. With Manny Smith and Doug Tharme injured, leaving only Shaun Pearson and Jake Lawlor available at centre-back, manager Graham Barrow said that "it gives us depth and would also allow us to play with three at the back if needs be." He made 13 appearances for the "Red Dragons" in the second half of the 2018–19 season, scoring goals against Barrow and Sutton United at the Racecourse Ground. Wrexham qualified for the National League play-off quarter-finals, but Kennedy had a goal ruled out as Wrexham were beaten 1–0 by Eastleigh; manager Bryan Hughes disagreed with the officials, saying "it was definitely a goal". Kennedy was offered a new deal at the end of the season, however, chose to reject it.

=== Port Vale ===
On 3 June 2019, Kennedy joined League Two side Port Vale on a one-year deal. Having coached Kennedy at Macclesfield and Shrewsbury, manager John Askey said that he would provide competition for established centre-backs Nathan Smith and Leon Legge. He scored an own goal on his debut for the "Valiants" on 3 September, in 2–1 victory over Shrewsbury Town in an EFL Trophy tie at Vale Park. He also scored an own goal on his league debut on 17 September, as Vale fell to a 2–0 at league leaders Exeter City. Having failed to break into the first-team at Vale, he rejoined Wrexham on loan on 20 November. The loan deal was later extended until the end of the 2019–20 season. He was released by Port Vale at the end of the season.

=== York City ===
On 13 August 2020, Kennedy joined National League North side York City on a one-year deal; he had previously worked under manager Steve Watson at Macclesfield Town. He played seven league games before the 2020–21 season was curtailed early due to the COVID-19 pandemic in England and was not retained at the end of his contract.

=== Macclesfield ===
On 4 June 2021, Kennedy was announced as the first signing for the new Macclesfield Town phoenix club Macclesfield. It was announced that he had signed a two-year deal with the North West Counties League Premier Division club. However, he featured just five times for Macclesfield.

=== Stockport Town ===
On 10 September 2021, Kennedy joined Stockport Town, who were a division below Macclesfield in the North West Counties League Division One South. He was sent off after the final whistle in a 3–1 defeat at Alsager Town. He played a total of 14 games for Stockport Town in the 2021–22 season.

== International career ==
Kennedy has been capped by the England under-19 team.

== Style of play ==
Kennedy is a right-footed left-sided centre-half who can also play with his left foot and as a left-back, right-back or central defensive midfielder. Port Vale manager John Askey described him as a "footballing centre-half" who combined athletic ability with composure on the ball. Macclesfield coach George Pilkington concurred, saying "he's quick, he's strong in the air, he's aggressive and he's got all the ingredients to go on and kick on again".

== Personal life ==
He graduated from Staffordshire University in 2022 with a degree in Professional Sports Writing and Broadcasting.

His grandfather, Paddy Kennedy, was one of the "Busby Babes", though he only played a handful of games in a seven-year career for Manchester United, Southampton and Blackburn Rovers.

== Career statistics ==
Appearances and goals by club, season and competition
Club	Season	League			National Cup (Note: Includes FA Cup and Scottish Cup)		League Cup (Note: Includes EFL Cup and Scottish League Cup)		Other		Total	
Club	Season	Division	Apps	Goals	Apps	Goals	Apps	Goals	Apps	Goals	Apps	Goals
Motherwell	2015–16	Scottish Premiership	22	0	1	0	2	0	—		25	0
Motherwell	2016–17	Scottish Premiership	0	0	0	0	0	0	—		0	0
Motherwell	Total		22	0	1	0	2	0	0	0	25	0
AFC Fylde	2016–17	National League North	2	0	0	0	—		0	0	2	0
Macclesfield Town	2017–18	National League	32	1	2	0	—		1 (Note: Appearances in the FA Trophy)	0	35	1
Shrewsbury Town	2018–19	League One	1	0	0	0	0	0	5 (Note: Appearances in the EFL Trophy)	0	6	0
Wrexham	2018–19	National League	12	2	0	0	—		1 (Note: Appearances in the play-offs)	0	13	2
Port Vale	2019–20	League Two	1	0	0	0	0	0	3	0	4	0
Wrexham (loan)	2019–20	National League	16	1	0	0	—		0	0	16	1
York City	2020–21	National League North	7	0	0	0	—		0	0	7	0
Macclesfield	2021–22	NWCL; Premier Division	3	0	2	0	—		0	0	5	0
Stockport Town	2021–22	NWCL; Division One South	13	0	0	0	—		1 (Note: Appearances in the Cheshire Senior Cup)	0	14	0
Career total			109	4	5	0	2	0	11	0	127	4

== Honours ==
Macclesfield Town

- National League: 2017–18
