= Birkrem =

Birkrem is a Norwegian surname. Notable people with the surname include:

- Åse Birkrem, Norwegian handball player
- Unni Birkrem, Norwegian handball goalkeeper
