= 2015–16 Motherwell F.C. season =

Motherwell
2015–16 season
- Chairman: Brian McCafferty
- Manager: Ian Baraclough (until 23 September); Stephen Craigan (interim) (23 September – 13 October); Mark McGhee (from 13 October)
- Stadium: Fir Park
- Scottish Premiership: 5th
- Scottish Cup: Fifth round
- League Cup: Third round
- Top goalscorer: League: Louis Moult (15); All: Louis Moult (18)
- Average home league attendance: 4,912
Home colours	Away colours

The 2015–16 season is Motherwell's thirty-first consecutive season in the top flight of Scottish football and the third in the newly established Scottish Premiership, having been promoted from the Scottish First Division at the end of the 1984–85 season. Motherwell will also compete in the League Cup and the Scottish Cup.

== Important Events ==
On 3 June, Motherwell announced the permanent signing of Joe Chalmers from Celtic, on a contract until the summer of 2017.

On 12 June, Motherwell announced their first batch of Pre-season Friendlies.

On 24 June, Motherwell announced that Lionel Ainsworth had signed a new two-year contract with the club.

On 25 June, Motherwell announced the return of David Clarkson to the club, on a contract until the end of the season.

On 27 June, Motherwell announced the permanent signing of Wes Fletcher from York City to a one-year contract.

On 29 June, Motherwell announced that Marvin Johnson had signed a new three-year contract with the club.

On 30 June, Motherwell announced the permanent signing of Louis Laing from Nottingham Forest, on a contract until the summer of 2017, and the signing of Louis Moult from Wrexham until the summer of 2018.

On 16 July, Motherwell announced the permanent signing of Kieran Kennedy from Leicester City, on a contract until the summer of 2017.

On 21 July, Motherwell announced that Scott McDonald had signed a new one-year contract with the club, with the option of an additional year.

On 31 July, Motherwell announced the signing of Connor Ripley on loan from Middlesbrough until January.

On 11 August, Motherwell announced the season-long loan signing of Jake Taylor from Reading.

On 28 August, Motherwell announced the signing of free-agent Theo Robinson to a one-year contract.

On 1 September, Motherwell announced the loan signing of Liam Grimshaw from Manchester United until January.<

On 15 September, Motherwell announced the signing of free-agent Craig Samson on a contract until the end of the season.

On 23 September 2015, Motherwell parted ways with manager Ian Baraclough.

On 13 October 2015, Mark McGhee returned to the club as manager.

On 18 December, Motherwell announced the return of James McFadden to the club on a short-term contract until the end of January.

On 2 January, Motherwell announced that they had extended their loan deal with Connor Ripley from Middlesbrough until the end of the season.

On 12 January, Motherwell announced that Manchester United had ended Liam Grimshaw's loan deal the day before and that he had returned to his parent club.

On 25 January, Motherwell announced that Jake Taylor's loan deal had been ended early and the player had returned to Reading with the view to joining Exeter City permanently.

On 1 February, Motherwell announced the signing of Morgaro Gomis on loan from Heart of Midlothian until the end of the season.

On 13 February, Motherwell announced that James McFadden had extended his contract with the club until the end of the season.

On 14 March, Motherwell extended their contract with Chris Cadden until the summer of 2018.

On 16 May, Motherwell announced that they had offered new contracts to Stevie Hammell, Stephen McManus, Craig Samson, Keith Lasley, Craig Moore, James McFadden, David Ferguson, Ben Hall, Scott McDonald, Dylan Mackin, Robbie Leith, Jack McMillan, Ross MacLean and Ryan Watters, whilst also announcing that Wes Fletcher, David Clarkson, Jack Leitch and Brett Long would all be leaving the club on the expiration of their contracts.

On 26 May, Motherwell announced that Craig Samson, David Ferguson and Craig Moore had all signed new one-year contracts with the club.

== Squad ==
As of match played 15 May 2016

No.	Name	Nationality	Position	Date of birth (age)	Signed from	Signed in	Contract ends	Apps.	Goals
Goalkeepers
1	Connor Ripley	(England)	GK	13 February 1993 (aged 23)	on loan from Middlesbrough	2015	2016	40	0
13	Craig Samson	(Scotland)	GK	1 April 1984 (aged 32)	Unattached	2015	2017	2	0
31	Brett Long	(Northern Ireland)	GK	11 April 1997 (aged 19)	Cliftonville	2014		0	0
41	P. J. Morrison	(Scotland)	GK	27 February 1998 (aged 18)	Academy	2015		0	0
Defenders
3	Steven Hammell	(Scotland)	DF	18 February 1982 (aged 34)	Southend United	2008	2016	547	5
5	Louis Laing	(England)	DF	6 March 1993 (aged 23)	Nottingham Forest	2015	2017	29	2
6	Stephen McManus	(Scotland)	DF	2 September 1982 (aged 33)	Unattached	2013	2016	124	6
15	Joe Chalmers	(Scotland)	DF	3 January 1994 (aged 22)	Celtic	2015	2017	19	0
16	Kieran Kennedy	(England)	DF	23 September 1993 (aged 22)	Leicester City	2015	2017	25	0
28	Luke Watt	(Scotland)	DF	20 June 1997 (aged 18)	Academy	2014		8	0
32	Ben Hall	(Northern Ireland)	DF	16 January 1997 (aged 19)	Dungannon Swifts	2013		19	1
33	Jack McMillan	(Scotland)	DF	18 December 1997 (aged 18)	Academy	2015		0	0
38	Adam Livingstone	(Scotland)	DF	22 February 1998 (aged 18)	Academy	2015		0	0
Midfielders
7	Lionel Ainsworth	(England)	MF	1 October 1987 (aged 28)	Rotherham United	2014	2017	103	23
8	Stephen Pearson	(Scotland)	MF	2 October 1982 (aged 33)	Kerala Blasters	2015	2017	131	23
11	Marvin Johnson	(England)	MF	1 December 1990 (aged 25)	Kidderminster Harriers	2015	2018	55	7
14	Keith Lasley	(Scotland)	MF	21 September 1979 (aged 36)	Unattached	2006	2016	454	23
17	Morgaro Gomis	(Senegal)	MF	14 July 1985 (aged 30)	on loan Heart of Midlothian	2016	2016	11	0
18	Josh Law	(England)	MF	19 August 1989 (aged 26)	Alfreton Town	2014	2017	73	2
21	Jack Leitch	(Scotland)	MF	17 July 1995 (aged 20)	Academy	2013		32	0
23	Dom Thomas	(Scotland)	MF	14 February 1996 (aged 20)	Academy	2013		32	0
26	Chris Cadden	(Scotland)	MF	19 September 1996 (aged 19)	Academy	2013	2018	27	2
30	Robbie Leitch	(Scotland)	MF	1 April 1998 (aged 18)	Academy	2014		0	0
35	Allan Campbell	(Scotland)	MF	4 July 1998 (aged 17)	Academy	2015		0	0
37	Jake Hastie	(Scotland)	MF	18 March 1999 (aged 17)	Academy	2015		0	0
39	Ross MacLean	(Scotland)	MF	13 March 1997 (aged 19)	Academy	2014		1	0
40	Barry Maguire	(Scotland)	MF	27 April 1998 (aged 18)	Academy	2015		0	0
42	Josh Moore	(Scotland)	MF	26 March 1998 (aged 18)	Academy	2015		0	0
43	David Turnbull	(Scotland)	MF	10 July 1999 (aged 16)	Academy	2015		0	0
Forwards
9	Wes Fletcher	(England)	FW	28 February 1991 (aged 25)	York City	2015	2016	14	1
20	Louis Moult	(England)	FW	14 May 1992 (aged 24)	Wrexham	2015	2018	42	18
24	James McFadden	(Scotland)	FW	14 April 1983 (aged 33)	Unattached	2015	2016	117	42
36	Ryan Watters	(Scotland)	FW	12 May 1998 (aged 18)	Academy	2015		0	0
39	Dylan Falconer	(Scotland)	FW	23 May 1999 (aged 16)	Academy	2015		0	0
77	Scott McDonald	(Australia)	FW	21 August 1983 (aged 31)	Millwall	2015	2016	179	64
Away on loan
19	David Clarkson	(Scotland)	FW	16 August 1994 (aged 21)	Academy	2015	2016	261	56
22	Craig Moore	(Scotland)	FW	16 August 1994 (aged 21)	Academy	2011	2017	29	1
30	David Ferguson	(Scotland)	DF	24 March 1996 (aged 20)	Academy	2013	2017	5	0
34	Dylan Mackin	(Scotland)	FW	15 January 1997 (aged 19)	Academy	2013		1	0
Left during the season
2	Craig Reid	(Scotland)	DF	26 February 1986 (aged 30)	Unattached	2014	2016	38	1
4	Liam Grimshaw	(England)	MF	2 February 1995 (aged 21)	on loan Manchester United	2015	2016	16	0
17	Theo Robinson	(Jamaica)	FW	22 January 1989 (aged 27)	Unattached	2015	2016	11	0
12	Dan Twardzik	(Germany)	GK	13 April 1991 (aged 25)	Dundee	2014	2016	30	0
25	Jake Taylor (Note: Taylor was born in Ascot, England, and but chose to represent Wales, qualifying through his grandfather who has born in Barry. Taylor has represented Wales at U-17, U-19, U-21 and Senior level..)	(Wales)	MF	1 December 1991 (aged 24)	on loan Reading	2015	2016	8	0

== Transfers ==
=== In ===
Date	Position	Nationality	Name	From	Fee	Ref.
3 June 2015	DF	(Scotland)	Joe Chalmers	Celtic	Undisclosed	
25 June 2015	FW	(Scotland)	David Clarkson	Dundee	Undisclosed	
27 June 2015	FW	(England)	Wes Fletcher	York City	Undisclosed	
30 June 2015	DF	(England)	Louis Laing	Nottingham Forest	Undisclosed	
30 June 2015	FW	(England)	Louis Moult	Wrexham	Undisclosed	
16 July 2015	DF	(England)	Kieran Kennedy	Leicester City	Free	
28 August 2015	FW	(Jamaica)	Theo Robinson	Unattached	Free	
15 September 2015	GK	(Scotland)	Craig Samson	Unattached	Free	
18 December 2015	FW	(Scotland)	James McFadden	Unattached	Free	

=== Loans in ===
Date from	Position	Nationality	Name	From	Date to	Ref.
31 July 2015	GK	(England)	Connor Ripley	Middlesbrough	31 May 2016	
11 August 2015	MF	(Wales)	Jake Taylor	Reading	25 January 2016	
1 September 2015	MF	(England)	Liam Grimshaw	Manchester United	11 January 2015	
1 February 2016	MF	(Senegal)	Morgaro Gomis	Heart of Midlothian	31 May 2016	

=== Out ===
Date	Position	Nationality	Name	To	Fee	Ref.
25 January 2016	FW	(Jamaica)	Theo Robinson	Port Vale	Undisclosed	
1 February 2016	DF	(Scotland)	Craig Reid	Dunfermline Athletic	Undisclosed	

=== Loans out ===
Date from	Position	Nationality	Name	To	Date to	Ref.
30 July 2015	FW	(Scotland)	Craig Moore	Ayr United	31 May 2016	
30 October 2015	DF	(Scotland)	Craig Reid	St Mirren	4 January 2016	
6 January 2016	DF	(Scotland)	David Ferguson	Airdrieonians	31 May 2016	
6 January 2016	FW	(Scotland)	Dylan Mackin	Airdrieonians	31 May 2016	
27 January 2016	FW	(Scotland)	David Clarkson	St Mirren	31 May 2016	

=== Released ===
Date	Position	Nationality	Name	Joined	Date	Ref.
26 January 2016	GK	(Germany)	Dan Twardzik	VSG Altglienicke	2018	
31 May 2016	GK	(Northern Ireland)	Brett Long			
31 May 2016	DF	(Northern Ireland)	Ben Hall	Brighton & Hove Albion	14 June 2016	
31 May 2016	MF	(Scotland)	Jack Leitch	Airdrieonians	2 September 2016	
31 May 2016	FW	(Scotland)	David Clarkson	St Mirren	1 June 2016	
31 May 2016	FW	(England)	Wes Fletcher	The New Saints	30 August 2016	

== Friendlies ==
7 July 2015	Motherwell	1–1	Borussia Mönchengladbach U-23	Rheden, Netherlands
18:00 BST (UTC+1)	Fletcher 49'	Report	Pisano 70'	Stadium: VV Rheden

9 July 2015	Motherwell	0–0	Heerenveen	Drachten, Netherlands
18:00 BST (UTC+1)		Report		Stadium: Sportvereniging Langezwaag

14 July 2015	Motherwell	0–3	Bradford City	Grangemouth
14:00 BST (UTC+1)		Report	Leigh 45+1'; Sheehan 63'; Hanson 70'	Stadium: Grangemouth Stadium
Note: Motherwell played their home friendly at Grangemouth Stadium due to on going renovation works delayed by the previous seasons play-off matches.

18 July 2015	Livingston	0–2	Motherwell	Livingston
15:00 BST (UTC+1)		Report	Ainsworth; Watt	Stadium: The Energy Assets Arena
Note: Motherwell played their home friendly at The Energy Assets Arena due to on going renovation works delayed by the previous seasons play-off matches.

21 July 2015	Sligo Rovers	1–2	Motherwell	Sligo
19:45 BST (UTC+1)	K.Ward 11'	Report	Thomas 8'; Fletcher 90'	Stadium: The Showgrounds

24 July 2015	Motherwell	1–2	Preston North End	Livingston
19:00 BST UTC+1	Moult 89'	Report	Garner 28'; Kilkenny 30'	Stadium: The Energy Assets Arena; Attendance: 483; Referee: J Beaton
Note: Motherwell played their home friendly at The Energy Assets Arena due to on going renovation works delayed by the previous seasons play-off matches.

== Competitions ==
=== Overview ===
Competition	First match	Last match	Starting round	Final position	Record							
Competition	First match	Last match	Starting round	Final position	Pld	W	D	L	GF	GA	GD	Win %
Premiership	1 August 2015	15 May 2016	Matchday 1	5th	38	15	5	18	47	63	−16	39.47
Scottish Cup	9 January 2016	6 February 2016	Fourth round	Fifth round	2	1	0	1	6	2	+4	50.00
League Cup	25 August 2015	3022 September 2015	Fourth round	Third round	2	1	0	1	2	3	−1	50.00
Total					42	17	5	20	55	68	−13	40.48

Last updated: 15 May 2016
Source: Soccerway

=== Premiership ===
==== Table ====
Pos	Team	Pld	W	D	L	GF	GA	GD	Pts	Qualification or relegation (Note: Teams play each other three times (33 matches), before the league is split into two groups (the top six and the bottom six).)
3	Heart of Midlothian	38	18	11	9	59	40	+19	65	Qualification for the Europa League first qualifying round
4	St Johnstone	38	16	8	14	58	55	+3	56	
5	Motherwell	38	15	5	18	47	63	−16	50	
6	Ross County	38	14	6	18	55	61	−6	48	
7	Inverness Caledonian Thistle	38	14	10	14	54	48	+6	52	

Source: Scottish Premiership, Soccerway (first phase), Soccerway (second phase)
Rules for classification: 1) Points; 2) Goal difference; 3) Goals scored; 4) Play-off (only if deciding champion, UEFA competitions qualification and second stage group allocation).

==== Results by round ====
Round	1	2	3	4	5	6	7	8	9	10	11	12	13	14	15	16	17	18	19	20	21	22	23	24	25	26	27	28	29	30	31	32	33	34	35	36	37	38
Ground	A	H	A	H	A	H	H	A	H	A	H	A	A	H	A	H	H	A	H	H	A	H	A	A	H	A	A	H	A	H	H	A	H	H	A	H	A	A
Result	W	L	L	L	L	W	D	L	W	L	L	D	W	L	L	D	W	W	W	D	L	L	D	L	L	W	L	W	W	W	W	W	L	W	L	L	W	L
Position	5	7	7	9	9	7	8	9	9	9	10	10	10	10	11	11	10	10	8	8	8	9	9	10	11	8	8	8	7	6	5	4	4	4	5	5	5	5

Source: BBC Sport
A = Away; H = Home; W = Win; D = Draw; L = Loss

==== Results summary ====
Overall								Home						Away					
Pld	W	D	L	GF	GA	GD	Pts	W	D	L	GF	GA	GD	W	D	L	GF	GA	GD
38	15	5	18	47	63	−16	50	8	3	8	27	27	0	7	2	10	20	36	−16

Source: BBC Sport

==== Results ====
1 August 2015 1	Inverness Caledonian Thistle	0–1	Motherwell	Inverness
15:00 BST (UTC+1)	Warren (yellow card) 1'	BBC; Motherwell	Fletcher 4'; Pearson (yellow card) 38'	Stadium: Caledonian Stadium; Attendance: 3,307; Referee: Allan Crawford

8 August 2015 2	Motherwell	0–2	Dundee United	Motherwell
15:00 BST (UTC+1)	Leitch (yellow card) 64'; Hammell (yellow card) 89'; Ripley (yellow card) 90+1'	BBC; Motherwell	Laing 83' (o.g.); Fraser (yellow card) 90+3'; Murray 90+5'	Stadium: Fir Park; Attendance: 4,859; Referee: Bobbie Madden

12 August 2015 3	Heart of Midlothian	2–0	Motherwell	Edinburgh
19:45 BST (UTC+1)	Reilly 32' (pen.); King 64'	BBC; Motherwell	Laing (yellow card) 28'; Taylor (yellow card) 59'	Stadium: Tynecastle Stadium; Attendance: 16,645; Referee: Brian Colvin

15 August 2015 4	Motherwell	1–2	Aberdeen	Motherwell
15:00 BST (UTC+1)	Johnson 5'; Hammell (yellow card) 50'	BBC; Motherwell	McGinn 25'; Logan (yellow card) 40'; Taylor (yellow card) 61' (goal) 62'	Stadium: Fir Park; Attendance: 5,437; Referee: Willie Collum

22 August 2015 5	St Johnstone	2–1	Motherwell	Perth
15:00 BST (UTC+1)	MacLean 62', 79'	BBC	Moult 11'; Taylor (yellow card) 28' (yellow-red card) 86'; Chalmers (yellow card) 68'	Stadium: McDiarmid Park; Attendance: 3,361; Referee: Craig Thomson

29 August 2015 6	Motherwell	1–0	Kilmarnock	Motherwell
15:00 BST (UTC+1)	Moult 13' (pen.); Chalmers (yellow card) 90+2'	BBC		Stadium: Fir Park; Attendance: 4,136; Referee: Steven McLean

12 September 2015 7	Motherwell	1–1	Ross County	Motherwell
15:00 BST (UTC+1)	Moult 90+1'	BBC	Gardyne 33'; Reckord (yellow card) 57'; Quinn (yellow card) 68'; Foster (yellow card) 80'	Stadium: Fir Park; Attendance: 3,545; Referee: Don Robertson

19 September 2015 8	Hamilton Academical	1–0	Motherwell	Hamilton
15:00 BST (UTC+1)	Docherty (yellow card) 57'; Imrie 72'	BBC	Lasley (yellow card) 43'; McManus (yellow card) 74'	Stadium: New Douglas Park; Attendance: 3,325; Referee: Craig Thomson

26 September 2015 9	Motherwell	2–1	Partick Thistle	Motherwell
15:00 BST (UTC+1)	Frans 22' (o.g.); Moult (yellow card) 45'; McDonald 69'; Lasley (yellow card) 71'; Ripley (yellow card) 89'	BBC Report	Osman (yellow card) 36'; Frans (yellow card) 44'; Welsh (yellow card) 58'; Amoo 78'; Seaborne (yellow card) 89'	Stadium: Fir Park; Attendance: 3,963; Referee: Tony Harrington

3 October 2015 10	Dundee	2–1	Motherwell	Dundee
15:00 BST (UTC+1)	Konrad (yellow card) 36'; Loy 58'; Holt 70'	BBC Report	Moult (yellow card) 23'; Kennedy (yellow card) 54'; Pearson 83'	Stadium: Dens Park; Attendance: 5,152; Referee: Steven McLean

17 October 2015 11	Motherwell	0–1	Celtic	Motherwell
15:00 BST (UTC+1)	McDonald (yellow card) 78'	Report	Çiftçi 15'	Stadium: Fir Park; Attendance: 8,888; Referee: Alan Muir

24 October 2015 12	Aberdeen	1–1	Motherwell	Aberdeen
15:00 BST (UTC+1)	Rooney 43'	BBC Report	Pearson (yellow card) 57'; McDonald 73'	Stadium: Pittodrie Stadium; Attendance: 12,389; Referee: Crawford Allan

31 October 2015 13	Kilmarnock	0–1	Motherwell	Kilmarnock
15:00 GMT (UTC)	McHattie (yellow card) 36'; Findlay (yellow card) 56'; McKenzie (yellow card) 67'; Magennis (yellow card) 77'	BBC Report	Ainsworth (yellow card) 36'; Chalmers (yellow card) 60'; Moult 87'	Stadium: Rugby Park; Attendance: 3,931; Referee: Bobby Madden

7 November 2015 14	Motherwell	1–3	Inverness Caledonian Thistle	Motherwell
15:00 GMT (UTC)	Pearson (yellow card) 13'; Kennedy (yellow card) 56'; Moult 58'; McManus (yellow card) 65' (yellow-red card) 90+5'	BBC Report	Tansey 11' (pen.); Vigurs (yellow card) 18' (goal) 53'; Storey 45'; Devine (yellow card) 52'	Stadium: Fir Park; Attendance: 3,569; Referee: Craig Thomson

21 November 2015 15	Ross County	3–0	Motherwell	Dingwall
15:00 GMT (UTC)	Curran 22'; Dingwall 69'; Boyce 90+2' (pen.)	BBC Report	Law (yellow card) 27'; Pearson (yellow card) 53'	Stadium: Global Energy Stadium; Attendance: 3,378; Referee: Crawford Allan

28 November 2015 16	Motherwell	2–2	Heart of Midlothian	Motherwell
15:00 GMT (UTC)	Moult 2'; Hammell (yellow card) 29'; Johnson 65'; Grimshaw (yellow card) 80'; Pearson (yellow card) 90+1'	BBC Report	Alexander (yellow card) 3'; Juanma 9'; Pallardó (yellow card) 23'; Sow 69'	Stadium: Fir Park; Attendance: 5,141; Referee: Steven McLean

5 December 2015 17	Partick Thistle	Postponed	Motherwell	Glasgow
15:00 GMT (UTC)		BBC Report		Stadium: Firhill Stadium

12 December 2015 18	Motherwell	3–1	Dundee	Motherwell
15:00 GMT (UTC)	McDonald 6' (yellow card) 60'; Moult 32'; Pearson 90+1'	BBC Report	Irvine (yellow card) 57'; McGowan (yellow card) 67'; Harkins 68'	Stadium: Fir Park; Attendance: 3,512; Referee: Euan Anderson

19 December 2015 19	Celtic	1–2	Motherwell	Glasgow
15:00 GMT (UTC)	Bitton 49' (yellow card) 78'	BBC Report	Moult 53', 59' (pen.)	Stadium: Celtic Park; Attendance: 42,603; Referee: Bobby Madden

26 December 2015 20	Dundee United	Postponed	Motherwell	Dundee
15:00 GMT (UTC)				Stadium: Tannadice Stadium; Referee: Andrew Dallas

30 December 2015 21	Motherwell	2–0	St Johnstone	Motherwell
19:45 GMT (UTC)	Hall 38'; Pearson 45'	BBC Report	Easton (yellow card) 48'; Fisher (yellow card) 90+2'	Stadium: Fir Park; Referee: Crawford Allan

2 January 2016 22	Motherwell	3–3	Hamilton Academical	Motherwell
15:00 GMT (UTC)	McDonald 9', 46'; Grimshaw (yellow card) 38'; Law (yellow card) 49'; Moult 57'; Lasley (yellow card) 70' (yellow-red card) 90+5'; McManus (yellow card) 87'	BBC Report	Lucas 25'; MacKinnon 28'; Imrie (yellow card) 50'; Crawford (yellow card) 52' (goal) 90+6'; Kurakins (yellow card) 78'	Stadium: Fir Park; Attendance: 5,734; Referee: Greg Aitken

16 January 2016 23	Heart of Midlothian	6–0	Motherwell	Edinburgh
15:00 GMT (UTC)	Rossi 11'; Sow 16'; Reilly 22' (pen.); Buaben (yellow card) 52'; Paterson 77'; Augustyn (yellow card) 81'; Juanma 87'; Djoum 90+1' (pen.)	BBC Report	Ripley (yellow card) 22'; McManus (yellow card) 37'; Moult (yellow card) 56'; Law (yellow card) 77'; Hammell (yellow card) 82'	Stadium: Tynecastle Stadium; Attendance: 16,574; Referee: Kevin Clancy

23 January 2016 24	Motherwell	1–2	Ross County	Motherwell
15:00 GMT (UTC)	Pearson 87'	BBC Report	Irvine 20'; Graham 69'; Curran (yellow card) 90+2'	Stadium: Fir Park; Attendance: 3,279; Referee: Willie Collum

30 January 2016 25	Dundee	2–2	Motherwell	Dundee
15:00 GMT (UTC)	McGowan 6'; Hemmings 88' (pen.)	BBC Report	Cadden 4' (yellow card) 87'; Pearson 23'; Law (yellow card) 78'	Stadium: Dens Park; Attendance: 4,960; Referee: John Beaton

2 February 2016 17	Partick Thistle	1–0	Motherwell	Glasgow
19:45 GMT (UTC)	Miller (yellow card) 23'; Seaborne (yellow card) 29'; Bannigan (yellow card) 35'; Osman (yellow card) 38'; Lawless 90+1'	BBC Report	Pearson (yellow card) 41'	Stadium: Firhill Stadium; Attendance: 2,487; Referee: Barry Cook

13 February 2016 26	Motherwell	0–2	Kilmarnock	Motherwell
15:00 GMT (UTC)	Hammell (yellow card) 33'; Pearson (yellow card) 45'; McManus (yellow card) 70'	BBC Report	Obadeyi (yellow card) 51'; Dicker (yellow card) 53'; Kiltie 56'; Slater 61'	Stadium: Fir Park; Attendance: 3,764; Referee: Andrew Dallas

16 February 2016 20	Dundee United	0–3	Motherwell	Dundee
19:45 GMT (UTC)	Demel (yellow card) 64'; Dillon (yellow card) 84'	BBC Report	McManus 45+1'; McDonald 72', 80' (yellow card) 77'	Stadium: Tannadice Stadium; Attendance: 6,251; Referee: Greg Aitken

20 February 2016 27	St Johnstone	2–1	Motherwell	Perth
15:00 GMT (UTC)	Wotherspoon 43'; Fisher (yellow card) 60'; Scobbie (yellow card) 84' (goal) 90+1'	BBC Report	Moult 33'; Hall (yellow card) 90'	Stadium: McDiarmid Park; Attendance: 3,006; Referee: Bobby Madden

27 February 2016 28	Motherwell	3–1	Partick Thistle	Motherwell
15:00 GMT (UTC)	Moult 37' (pen.), 52'; Johnson 69'	Report	Nesbitt (yellow card) 36'; Booth 76'	Stadium: Fir Park; Attendance: 4,302; Referee: Stephen Finnie

5 March 2016 29	Hamilton Academical	0–1	Motherwell	Hamilton
15:00 GMT (UTC)	Gordon (yellow card) 7'; Kurakins (yellow card) 9'; Kurtaj (yellow card) 10'; McGovern (yellow card) 79'; Morris (yellow card) 85'	report	Laing 45'; Johnson (yellow card) 77'	Stadium: New Douglas Park; Attendance: 3,755; Referee: Kevin Clancy

11 March 2016 30	Motherwell	2–1	Dundee United	Motherwell
19:45 GMT (UTC)	Johnson 45+1'; Lasley (yellow card) 54'; Moult 65'	Report	Anier 22'; Donaldson (yellow card) 42'; Dillon (yellow card) 72'; Morris (yellow card) 74'; Paton (yellow card) 90+3'	Stadium: Fir Park; Attendance: 4,210; Referee: Crawford Allan

19 March 2016 31	Motherwell	2–1	Aberdeen	Motherwell
15:00 GMT (UTC)	Gomis (yellow card) 34'; Kennedy (yellow card) 44'; Leitch (yellow card) 51'; McDonald 73'; Moult 75'	Report	McLean 44' (pen.); Robson (red card) 79'	Stadium: Fir Park; Attendance: 6.251; Referee: Don Robertson

2 April 2016 32	Inverness Caledonian Thistle	1–2	Motherwell	Inverness
15:00 BST (UTC+1)	Tremarco (yellow card) 41'; Vigurs 70' (pen.); Draper (yellow card) 83'	Report	Ainsworth 62'; McDonald (yellow card) 90'; Johnson 90+4'	Stadium: Caledonian Stadium; Attendance: 3,348; Referee: John Beaton

9 April 2016 33	Motherwell	1–2	Celtic	Motherwell
12:30 BST (UTC+1)	McDonald 60'; McManus (yellow card) 83'	Report	Griffiths 44', 75' (yellow card) 45'; Kazim-Richards (yellow card) 75'	Stadium: Fir Park; Attendance: 9,123; Referee: Willie Collum

23 April 2016 34	Motherwell	1–0	Heart of Midlothian	Motherwell
15:00 BST (UTC+1)	Hammell (yellow card) 22'; Ainsworth 28'; Cadden (yellow card) 62'	Report	Kitchen (yellow card) 68'; Smith (yellow card) 70'	Stadium: Fir Park; Attendance: 5,125; Referee: Andrew Dallas

30 April 2016 35	Aberdeen	4–1	Motherwell	Aberdeen
15:00 BST (UTC+1)	McLean 6' (pen.) (yellow card) 77'; Shinnie (yellow card) 21'; McGinn 26'; Rooney 54'; Logan (yellow card) 66'; Hayes 78'	Report	Laing (yellow card) 45'; Cadden 64'; Moult (yellow card) 65'; Lasley (red card) 88'	Stadium: Pittodrie Stadium; Attendance: 10,259; Referee: Bobby Madden

7 May 2016 36	Motherwell	1–2	St Johnstone	Motherwell
15:00 BST (UTC+1)	McDonald 4'; Pearson (yellow card) 67'; Leitch (yellow card) 89'	Report	MacLean 34'; Fisher (yellow card) 39'; Swanson 45'	Stadium: Fir Park; Attendance: 4,441; Referee: Greg Aitken

11 May 2016 37	Ross County	1–3	Motherwell	Dingwall
19:45 BST (UTC+1)	Murdoch (yellow card) 33'; Irvine (yellow card) 35'; Quinn (yellow card) 68'; Boyce 69'	Report	Pearson 4', 90+2'; Lasley 16'; McDonald (yellow card) 38'; Hammell (yellow card) 64'	Stadium: Global Energy Stadium; Attendance: 2,976; Referee: John Beaton

15 May 2016 38	Celtic	7–0	Motherwell	Glasgow
12:30 BST (UTC+1)	Tierney 21'; Rogić 26'; Lustig 28'; Armstrong 50'; Roberts 54'; Christie 59'; Aitchison 77'	Report	Gomis (yellow card) 52'	Stadium: Celtic Park; Attendance: 49,050; Referee: Euan Anderson

=== Scottish Cup ===
9 January 2016 Fourth Round	Motherwell	5–0	Cove Rangers	Motherwell
15:00 GMT (UTC)	Moult 2'; McDonald 6'; Johnson 34'; Pearson 44', 61'	BBC Report		Stadium: Fir Park; Attendance: 3,833; Referee: Euan Anderson

6 February 2016 Fifth Round	Motherwell	1–2	Inverness Caledonian Thistle	Motherwell
15:00 GMT (UTC)	McDonald 67'; Pearson (yellow card) 77'	BBC Report	Storey 39'; Mbuyi-Mutombo (yellow card) 54'; Devine (yellow card) 66'; Roberts 90+1'	Stadium: Fir Park; Attendance: 3,907; Referee: Steven McLean

=== League Cup ===
25 August 2015 Second Round	East Fife	1–3 (a.e.t.)	Motherwell	Methil
19:45 BST (UTC+1)	Austin 60'; Naysmith (yellow card) 119'	BBC Report	Lasley (yellow card) 51'; Moult 80' (yellow card) 110'; McDonald 103'; Ainsworth 107'	Stadium: Bayview Stadium; Attendance: 1,158; Referee: Barry Cook

22 September 2015 Third Round	Greenock Morton	3–2 (a.e.t.)	Motherwell	Greenock
19:45 BST (UTC+1)	Samuel 11', 100'; Pepper (yellow card) 44'; Miller (yellow card) 76'; Kilday (yellow card) 108'; Tidser 112'	BBC Report	Moult (yellow card) 72' (goal) 116'; Law (yellow card) 61'; Chalmers (yellow card) 61'; McDonald 90+1'	Stadium: Cappielow; Attendance: 2,539; Referee: Greg Aitken

== Squad statistics ==
=== Appearances ===
As of match played 15 May 2016

No.	Pos	Nat	Player	Total		Premiership		Scottish Cup		League Cup	
No.	Pos	Nat	Player	Apps	Goals	Apps	Goals	Apps	Goals	Apps	Goals
1	GK	(England) ENG	Connor Ripley	40	0	36	0	2	0	2	0
3	DF	(Scotland) SCO	Steven Hammell	29	0	25+2	0	2	0	0	0
5	DF	(England) ENG	Louis Laing	16	1	13+2	1	0	0	1	0
6	DF	(Scotland) SCO	Stephen McManus	40	1	37	1	2	0	1	0
7	MF	(England) ENG	Lionel Ainsworth	33	3	17+12	2	0+2	0	1+1	1
8	MF	(Scotland) SCO	Stephen Pearson	28	9	25+1	7	2	2	0	0
9	FW	(England) ENG	Wes Fletcher	14	1	5+9	1	0	0	0	0
11	MF	(England) ENG	Marvin Johnson	42	6	34+4	5	2	1	2	0
13	GK	(Scotland) SCO	Craig Samson	2	0	2	0	0	0	0	0
14	MF	(Scotland) SCO	Keith Lasley	33	1	30	1	2	0	1	0
15	DF	(Scotland) SCO	Joe Chalmers	19	0	11+6	0	0	0	2	0
16	DF	(England) ENG	Kieran Kennedy	25	0	18+4	0	1	0	2	0
17	MF	(Senegal) SEN	Morgaro Gomis	11	0	8+2	0	1	0	0	0
18	MF	(England) ENG	Josh Law	33	0	28+1	0	2	0	2	0
19	FW	(Scotland) SCO	David Clarkson	8	0	0+7	0	0	0	1	0
20	FW	(England) ENG	Louis Moult	42	18	34+4	15	1+1	1	1+1	2
21	MF	(Scotland) SCO	Jack Leitch	13	0	3+8	0	0	0	2	0
23	MF	(Scotland) SCO	Dom Thomas	17	0	2+12	0	0+1	0	1+1	0
24	FW	(Scotland) SCO	James McFadden	4	0	2+1	0	0+1	0	0	0
26	MF	(Scotland) SCO	Chris Cadden	21	2	16+4	2	1	0	0	0
28	DF	(Scotland) SCO	Luke Watt	3	0	1+1	0	0	0	0+1	0
32	DF	(Northern Ireland) NIR	Ben Hall	19	1	16+2	1	1	0	0	0
34	FW	(Scotland) SCO	Dylan Mackin	1	0	0+1	0	0	0	0	0
77	FW	(Australia) AUS	Scott McDonald	41	14	34+3	10	2	2	0+2	2
Players away from the club on loan:
Players who left Motherwell during the season:
4	MF	(England) ENG	Liam Grimshaw	16	0	13+1	0	1	0	1	0
17	FW	(Jamaica) JAM	Theo Robinson	11	0	2+8	0	0	0	1	0
25	MF	(Wales) WAL	Jake Taylor	9	0	6+1	0	1	0	1	0

=== Goal scorers ===
As of match played 15 May 2016

Ranking	Position	Nation	Number	Name	Premiership	Scottish Cup	League Cup	Total
1	FW	(England)	20	Louis Moult	15	1	2	18
2	FW	(Australia)	77	Scott McDonald	10	2	2	14
3	MF	(Scotland)	8	Stephen Pearson	7	2	0	9
4	MF	(England)	11	Marvin Johnson	5	1	0	6
5	MF	(England)	7	Lionel Ainsworth	2	0	1	3
6	MF	(Scotland)	26	Chris Cadden	2	0	0	2
7	FW	(England)	9	Wes Fletcher	1	0	0	1
7	DF	(Northern Ireland)	32	Ben Hall	1	0	0	1
7	DF	(Scotland)	6	Stephen McManus	1	0	0	1
7	DF	(England)	5	Louis Laing	1	0	0	1
7	MF	(Scotland)	14	Keith Lasley	1	0	0	1
7				Own goal	1	0	0	1
TOTALS					47	6	5	55

=== Clean sheets ===
As of match played 15 May 2016

Ranking	Position	Nation	Number	Name	Premiership	Scottish Cup	League Cup	Total
1	GK	(England)	1	Connor Ripley	6	0	1	1
2	GK	(Scotland)	13	Craig Samson	1	0	0	1
TOTALS					7	0	1	8

=== Disciplinary record ===
As of match played 15 May 2016

Number	Nation	Position	Name	Premiership		Scottish Cup		League Cup		Total	
Number	Nation	Position	Name	Yellow card	Red card	Yellow card	Red card	Yellow card	Red card	Yellow card	Red card
1	(England)	GK	Connor Ripley	3	0	0	0	0	0	3	0
3	(Scotland)	DF	Steven Hammell	7	0	0	0	0	0	7	0
5	(England)	DF	Louis Laing	2	0	0	0	0	0	2	0
6	(Scotland)	DF	Stephen McManus	7	1	0	0	0	0	7	1
7	(England)	MF	Lionel Ainsworth	1	0	0	0	0	0	1	0
8	(Scotland)	MF	Stephen Pearson	8	0	1	0	0	0	9	0
11	(England)	MF	Marvin Johnson	1	0	0	0	0	0	1	0
14	(Scotland)	MF	Keith Lasley	5	2	0	0	1	0	6	2
15	(Scotland)	DF	Joe Chalmers	3	0	0	0	1	0	4	0
16	(England)	DF	Kieran Kennedy	3	0	0	0	0	0	3	0
17	(Senegal)	MF	Morgaro Gomis	2	0	0	0	0	0	2	0
18	(England)	MF	Josh Law	4	0	0	0	1	0	5	0
20	(England)	FW	Louis Moult	4	0	0	0	2	0	6	0
21	(Scotland)	MF	Jack Leitch	3	0	0	0	0	0	3	0
26	(Scotland)	MF	Chris Cadden	2	0	0	0	0	0	2	0
32	(Northern Ireland)	DF	Ben Hall	1	0	0	0	0	0	1	0
77	(Australia)	FW	Scott McDonald	5	0	0	0	0	0	5	0
Players away on loan:
Players who left Motherwell during the season:
4	(England)	MF	Liam Grimshaw	2	0	0	0	0	0	2	0
25	(Wales)	MF	Jake Taylor	3	1	0	0	0	0	3	1
			TOTALS	66	4	1	0	5	0	72	4

== Awards ==
=== Manager of the Month ===
Month	Name	Award	Ref
December	Mark McGhee	Won
March	Mark McGhee	Won

== See also ==
- List of Motherwell F.C. seasons
