= Cui Qi =

Cui Qi may refer to:

- Cui Qi (footballer, born 1993), Chinese footballer
- Cui Qi (footballer, born 1997), Chinese footballer
- Daniel C. Tsui, Chinese-born American physicist, also known as Cui Qi
