= Antonio Ramírez =

Antonio Ramírez may refer to:

- Antonio Ramírez (footballer), Chilean footballer
- Antonio Ramírez Ramos (born 1987), Mexican politician
- Toño Ramírez (Antonio Ramírez Martínez; born 1986), Spanish football goalkeeper
- Antonio Ramírez de Haro (died 1549), Spanish prelate, bishop of the Roman Catholic Diocese of Ciudad Rodrigo
- Antonio Ramírez (artist) (1926–2010), member of the Salón de la Plástica Mexicana
- Antonio Ramírez Jiménez (1939–2023), Venezuelan jurist, member of the Supreme Tribunal of Justice
