= Jake Taylor (footballer, born 1991) =

Wales international footballer (born 1991)

Personal information
- Full name: Jake William Trevor Taylor
- Date of birth: 1 December 1991 (age 34)
- Place of birth: Ascot, England
- Height: 1.78 m (5 ft 10 in)
- Positions: Midfielder; winger

Team information
- Current team: Sutton United
- Number: 8

Youth career
- 1999–2009: Reading

Senior career*
Years	Team	Apps	(Gls)
2009–2016	Reading	31	(2)
2011	→ Aldershot Town (loan)	3	(0)
2011–2012	→ Exeter City (loan)	30	(3)
2012–2013	→ Cheltenham Town (loan)	8	(1)
2013	→ Crawley Town (loan)	4	(0)
2015	→ Leyton Orient (loan)	3	(0)
2015–2016	→ Motherwell (loan)	7	(0)
2016–2021	Exeter City	226	(27)
2021–2023	Stevenage	85	(3)
2023–2025	Eastleigh	90	(10)
2025–	Sutton United	0	(0)

International career^{‡}
2007–2008	Wales U17	4	(1)
2008–2009	Wales U19	9	(3)
2010–2012	Wales U21	10	(0)
2014	Wales	1	(0)
- * Club domestic league appearances and goals as of 10:06, 5 November 2025 (UTC) ‡ National team caps and goals as of 19:00, 26 June 2016 (UTC)

Jake William Trevor Taylor (born 1 December 1991) is a professional footballer who plays as a midfielder for National League club Sutton United. He attained one international cap for Wales.

== Club career ==
=== Reading ===
Taylor joined Reading at the age of eight. Having scored 20 goals for the club's academy and under-18 sides during the 2009–10 season, he was handed his debut for the Royals in a League Cup game against Northampton Town at the Madejski Stadium on 24 August 2010, which ended in a 3–3 draw, with Northampton winning on penalties. He came on as a second-half substitute for Julian Kelly. He made his Football League debut on 9 May 2011 as a second-half substitute for Michail Antonio in the home game against Derby County.

==== Aldershot Town ====
On 28 July 2011, it was agreed that Taylor would go on a one-month loan to Aldershot Town, to take effect from 1 August.

==== Exeter City ====
On 21 September 2011, Taylor was loaned to Exeter City on a one-month loan which was subsequently renewed on a monthly basis until the end of the season.

==== Cheltenham Town ====
On 22 November 2012, Taylor joined Reading teammate Lawson D'Ath on loan at Cheltenham Town until 2 January 2013. He made his Cheltenham debut in a 1–0 win over Barnet on 24 November and scored his first goal for the club on 27 December in the win over Wycombe Wanderers. Taylor appeared regularly on the left wing during his initial stay at the club and on 4 January 2013 his loan was extended for another month.

He was recalled by Reading on 28 January, having started just one of Cheltenham's four matches since his loan was extended.

==== Crawley Town ====
The following month Taylor joined League One side Crawley Town on an initial one-month loan. He made his debut in the 2–0 win over Bury on 2 March playing in a central midfield role and made a further three appearances before returning to Reading at the end of March.

=== Return to Reading ===
On 5 October 2013, Taylor made his first Reading appearance for nearly two-and-a-half years as a second-half substitute in a 2–1 defeat to Burnley. After his return to the side, Taylor was selected in several match day squads, including the defeats to Leicester City and Middlesbrough, though he remained an unused substitute in both games.

In May 2014 Taylor signed a new two-year contract with the option of a third. That season he scored his first goal for Reading in a 1–0 win over Ipswich. Taylor then went on to score the winner in the League Cup in a 1–0 victory over Scunthorpe.

==== Leyton Orient ====
On 26 March 2015, Taylor joined League One side Leyton Orient on loan for the remainder of the 2014–15 season.

==== Motherwell ====
On 11 August 2015, Taylor joined Scottish Premiership side Motherwell on loan for the remainder of the 2015–16 season. Taylor made 8 appearances for Motherwell before being recalled by Reading in January 2016.

=== Exeter City ===
On 25 January 2016, Taylor joined League Two side Exeter City on a free transfer. He served as club captain between 2018 and 2021. On 12 May 2021, Taylor announced his intention to leave Exeter.

=== Stevenage ===
Taylor signed for fellow League Two club Stevenage on 21 May 2021. Following their promotion to League One, he was released at the end of the 2022–23 season.

=== Eastleigh ===
On 20 May 2023, he was announced to be joining National League club Eastleigh upon the expiration of his contract. Taylor won the Eastleigh Manager's Player of the Year award for the 2023-24 season and was named captain ahead of 2024-25.

=== Sutton United ===
On 4 November 2025, Taylor joined fellow National League club Sutton United.

== International career ==
Born in England, Taylor is eligible to play for Wales through his grandfather who was born in Barry.

Taylor has represented Wales at under-17 and under-19 level. On 18 May 2010, Taylor made his debut for the Wales under-21 side in a 1–0 defeat to Austria. In his last game for the under-21s, he captained the side against the Czech Republic in a 5–0 defeat.

In September 2014 Taylor was called up to the senior Wales squad for a match against Andorra. Taylor made his senior debut as an 84th-minute substitute for match winner Hal Robson-Kanu in a 2–1 European qualification victory against Cyprus on 13 October 2014.

== Career statistics ==
=== Club ===
As of end of 2022–23 season

Appearances and goals by club, season and competition
Club	Season	League			National cup (Note: Includes FA Cup)		League cup (Note: Includes Football League Cup, Scottish League Cup)		Other		Total	
Club	Season	Division	Apps	Goals	Apps	Goals	Apps	Goals	Apps	Goals	Apps	Goals
Reading	2010–11	Championship	1	0	0	0	1	0	—		2	0
Reading	2011–12	Championship	0	0	0	0	0	0	—		0	0
Reading	2012–13	Premier League	0	0	0	0	0	0	—		0	0
Reading	2013–14	Championship	8	0	1	0	0	0	—		9	0
Reading	2014–15	Championship	22	2	0	0	3	1	—		25	3
Reading	2015–16	Championship	0	0	0	0	0	0	—		0	0
Reading	Total		31	2	1	0	4	1	0	0	36	3
Aldershot Town (loan)	2011–12	League Two	3	0	0	0	1	0	0	0	4	0
Exeter City (loan)	2011–12	League One	30	3	0	0	0	0	0	0	30	3
Cheltenham Town (loan)	2012–13	League Two	8	1	3	0	0	0	0	0	11	1
Crawley Town (loan)	2012–13	League One	4	0	0	0	0	0	0	0	4	0
Leyton Orient (loan)	2014–15	League One	3	0	0	0	0	0	0	0	3	0
Motherwell (loan)	2015–16	Scottish Premiership	7	0	0	0	1	0	—		8	0
Exeter City	2015–16	League Two	16	4	0	0	0	0	0	0	16	4
Exeter City	2016–17	League Two	43	4	1	0	2	1	5 (Note: Two appearances in the Football League Trophy & three in the League Two play-offs)	0	51	5
Exeter City	2017–18	League Two	44	8	4	0	1	0	5	0	54	8
Exeter City	2018–19	League Two	46	3	1	0	2	0	0	0	49	3
Exeter City	2019–20	League Two	33	2	2	0	0	0	8 (Note: Five appearances in the Football League Trophy & three in the League Two play-offs)	1	43	3
Exeter City	2020–21	League Two	44	6	3	0	1	0	2 (Note: Appearances in the Football League Trophy)	0	50	6
Exeter City	Total		226	27	11	0	6	1	20	1	263	29
Stevenage	2021–22	League Two	42	3	3	0	2	0	4	0	51	3
Stevenage	2022–23	League Two	43	0	3	0	3	0	4	1	53	1
Stevenage	Total		85	3	6	0	5	0	8	1	104	4
Career total			397	36	21	0	17	2	28	2	463	40

=== International ===
As of match played 13 October 2014

Appearances and goals by national team and year
National team	Year	Apps	Goals
Wales	2014	1	0
Total		1	0
