= Chris Cadden =

Scottish footballer (born 1996)

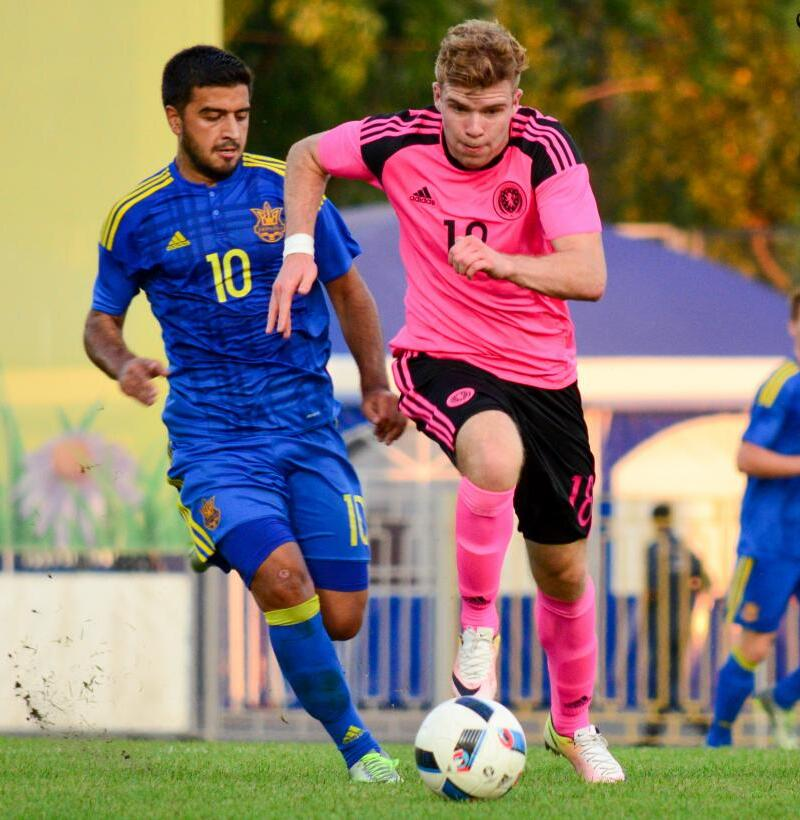
- Cadden (right) playing for Scotland U21s, 2016

Personal information
- Full name: Christopher Cadden
- Date of birth: 19 September 1996 (age 30)
- Place of birth: Bellshill, North Lanarkshire, Scotland
- Position: Right-back

Team information
- Current team: Aberdeen

Youth career
- 2006–2014: Motherwell

Senior career*
Years	Team	Apps	(Gls)
2013–2019	Motherwell	115	(6)
2015	→ Albion Rovers (loan)	10	(2)
2019–2020	Columbus Crew	8	(0)
2019–2020	→ Oxford United (loan)	21	(0)
2021–2026	Hibernian	138	(5)
2026–	Aberdeen	0	(0)

International career^{‡}
2016–2018	Scotland U21	12	(1)
2018	Scotland	2	(0)
- * Club domestic league appearances and goals as of 20 May 2026 ‡ National team caps and goals as of 16:22, 27 May 2023 (UTC)

Christopher Cadden (born 19 September 1996) is a Scottish professional footballer who plays as a right-back for Aberdeen. Cadden, who is a product of the Motherwell Academy, has previously played for Motherwell, Albion Rovers, Columbus Crew, Oxford United, and Hibernian. He made two full international appearance for Scotland in May 2018.

== Club career ==
=== Motherwell ===
Cadden made his Motherwell debut as a substitute in a 4–1 win against Hearts on 1 March 2014. On 6 March 2015, Cadden joined Scottish League Two club Albion Rovers on loan until the end of the season. Cadden scored his first career goal on 4 April 2015, as Albion Rovers beat Berwick Rangers 2–0, and another in Albion Rovers' league-winning match against Clyde. His loan spell concluded with the club being promoted as divisional winners. On 30 January 2016, Cadden scored his first goal for Motherwell in a 2–2 draw away to Dundee. In March 2016, he signed a new contract with the club to run until the summer of 2018. By now establishing himself in the first team, he also contributed to Motherwell's Under-20s winning the Scottish Youth Cup for the first time. Cadden signed another contract with Motherwell in November 2016, extending its term by another year. He played in the finals of the 2017–18 League Cup and the 2017–18 Scottish Cup, both of which resulted in 2–0 defeats for Motherwell at the hands of Celtic.

=== Columbus Crew SC ===
On 23 July 2019, free agent Cadden signed for Major League Soccer side Columbus Crew SC; it was announced that he would be immediately loaned to English club Oxford United and would join the Crew in advance of the 2020 season. Motherwell stated they would negotiate for a training compensation fee, due to no formal arrangement being in place with MLS in respect of clubs which had developed a young player receiving a payment when they left out of contract.

==== Loan to Oxford United ====
Cadden made his Oxford debut in a 1–1 draw at Sunderland on the opening day of the 2019–20 season. During Cadden's loan spell, he made 21 appearances for Oxford and was widely considered one of the best right backs in EFL League One. Oxford manager Karl Robinson looked to make the loan permanent, but had its advances rejected by the Crew.

==== Return to Columbus ====
Cadden started the 2020 season as depth at both the wing and wing-back positions, but was widely considered the successor to 33-year-old Ghanaian Harrison Afful. Cadden made his debut for the Crew against New York City FC in the first game of the season. He came on in the 87th minute for fellow debutant Lucas Zelarayán. In December 2020 he was part of the squad that won the MLS Cup. In January, it was reported that Cadden would likely leave the club in a bid to gain more playing time; it was noted that his transition to America was made difficult by the COVID-19 pandemic. Cadden was linked with a return to Great Britain with Hibernian, Aberdeen, and Oxford United.

=== Hibernian ===
On 15 January 2021, Cadden returned home to Scotland, signing for Hibernian on a two-and-a-half-year deal for an undisclosed fee. He signed a new contract with Hibs in August 2022, which is due to run until the end of the 2024–25 season. Cadden suffered an achilles tendon injury during the last game of the 2022–23 season, which prevented him from playing for several months. He made his first appearance since the injury on 10 February 2024, in a Scottish Cup tie against Inverness.

=== Aberdeen ===
Cadden signed a two-year contract with Aberdeen on 31 July 2026.

== International career ==
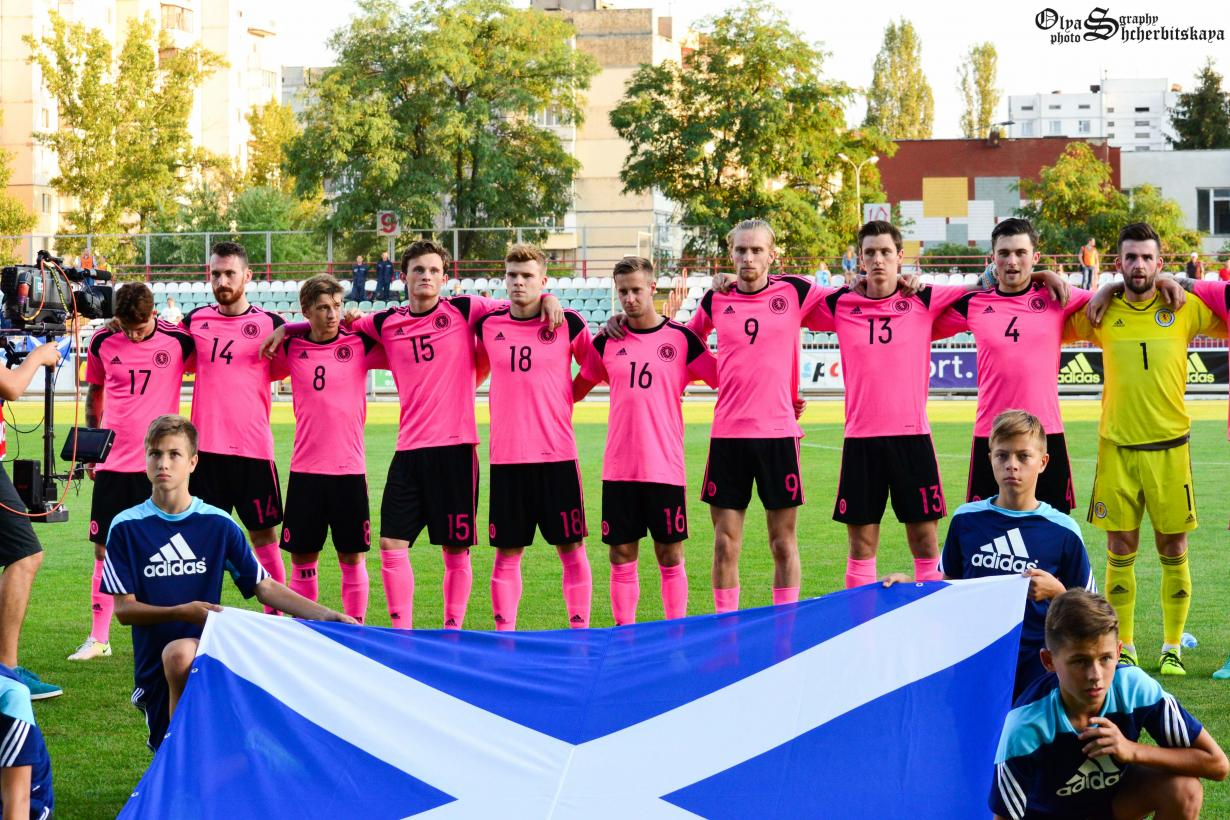
Cadden (No 18) with Scotland U21s in Ukraine, 2016

In August 2016, Cadden was named in the Scotland under-21 squad for the first time ahead of the European Under-21 Championship qualifiers against Macedonia and Ukraine, receiving the call having initially been left out the squad. He made his debut against Ukraine on 6 September 2016.

On 17 May 2018, Cadden was called up to the Scotland squad for the first time ahead of their friendlies against Peru and Mexico; he made his full Scotland debut on 29 May, in a 2–0 defeat to Peru.

== Personal life ==
His twin brother, Nicky, is also a professional footballer; he plays for Hibernian after moving from Barnsley in 2024. The brothers attended Our Lady's High School, Motherwell, one year group ahead of fellow footballer Kieran Tierney. Their father Steve also won a lower division title with Albion Rovers and appeared in a Youth Cup final for Motherwell.

== Career statistics ==
=== Club ===
As of match played on 16 May 2026

Appearances and goals by club, season and competition
Club	Season	League			Domestic Cup (Note: All appearances in the Scottish Cup) (Note: All appearances in the FA Cup) (Note: All appearances in the U.S. Open Cup)		League Cup (Note: All appearances in the Scottish League Cup) (Note: All appearances in the MLS Playoffs)		Continental		Other (Note: Includes ALL appearances in the MLS is Back Tournament)		Total	
Club	Season	Division	Apps	Goals	Apps	Goals	Apps	Goals	Apps	Goals	Apps	Goals	Apps	Goals
Motherwell	2013–14	Scottish Premiership	3	0	0	0	0	0	0	0	—		3	0
Motherwell	2014–15	Scottish Premiership	3	0	0	0	0	0	0	0	0	0	3	0
Motherwell	2015–16	Scottish Premiership	20	2	1	0	0	0	—		—		21	2
Motherwell	2016–17	Scottish Premiership	36	3	1	0	5	2	—		—		42	5
Motherwell	2017–18	Scottish Premiership	33	0	4	0	8	4	—		—		45	4
Motherwell	2018–19	Scottish Premiership	20	1	0	0	5	0	—		—		25	1
Motherwell	Total		115	6	6	0	18	6	0	0	0	0	139	12
Albion Rovers (loan)	2014–15	Scottish League Two	10	2	0	0	0	0	—		0	0	10	2
Columbus Crew SC	2019	MLS	0	0	0	0	—		—		—		0	0
Columbus Crew SC	2020	MLS	8	0	— (Note: The 2020 U.S. Open Cup was not played due to the COVID-19 pandemic)		2	0	—		1	0	11	0
Columbus Crew SC	Total		8	0	0	0	2	0	0	0	1	0	11	0
Oxford United (loan)	2019–20	League One	21	0	2	0	0	0	—		0	0	23	0
Hibernian	2020–21	Scottish Premiership	10	0	1	0	1	0	—		—		12	0
Hibernian	2021–22	Scottish Premiership	28	2	4	1	2	0	0	0	—		34	3
Hibernian	2022–23	Scottish Premiership	37	1	1	0	4	0	—		—		42	1
Hibernian	2023–24	Scottish Premiership	11	1	2	0	0	0	0	0	—		13	1
Hibernian	2024–25	Scottish Premiership	32	0	3	0	2	0	—		—		37	0
Hibernian	2025–26	Scottish Premiership	20	1	0	0	1	0	6	1	—		27	2
Hibernian	Total		138	5	11	1	10	0	6	1	—		165	7
Career total			292	13	19	1	30	6	6	1	1	0	348	21

=== International ===
As of 2 June 2018

Scotland
Year	Apps	Goals
2018	2	0
Total	2	0

== Honours ==
Albion Rovers

- Scottish League Two: 2014–15

Columbus Crew

- MLS Cup: 2020

== See also ==
- List of Hibernian F.C. players
- List of Motherwell F.C. players
- List of Scottish football families
- List of twin teammates in sports
