= Unni Birkrem =

Norwegian handball goalkeeper

Personal information
- Nationality: Norwegian
- Born: April 2, 1966 (age 60)

Sport
- Sport: Handball
- Position: Goalkeeper

Senior clubs
- Years: Team
- 1981–1983: IK Våg
- 1983–1985: Kristiansand IF
- 1985–1990: Byåsen IL
National team
| Years | Team | Apps |
| 1985–1989 | Norway | 31 |
Medal record
Representing Norway
World championship
| Bronze medal – third place | 1986 Netherlands | Team |

Unni Birkrem (born 2 April 1966) is a Norwegian handball goalkeeper. She played 31 matches for the national handball team from 1985 to 1989, and participated at the 1986 World Women's Handball Championship, where the Norwegian team won a bronze medal. She is a twin sister of Åse Birkrem.

She made her senior debut for IK Våg in 1981 in the 4. division together with her sister. Two years later they both joined Kristiansand IF in the 2nd division. She then played for the top division club Byåsen IL from 1985 to 1990, where she retired. She won the Norwegian Cup once in 1988.

She is educated as a nurse.
