= Åse Birkrem =

Norwegian handball player

Medal record

Representing Norway

Women's handball

World championship
Bronze medal – third place	1986 Netherlands	Team

Åse Birkrem (born 2 April 1966) is a Norwegian handball player. She played 21 matches for the national handball team in 1986, and participated at the 1986 World Women's Handball Championship, where the Norwegian team won a bronze medal. She is a twin sister of Unni Birkrem.

She made her senior debut for IK Våg in 1981 in the 4. division together with her sister. Two years later they both joined Kristiansand IF in the 2nd division.
