= Cui Lin (footballer) =

Chinese footballer

Cui Lin 崔麟
Personal information
- Date of birth: 26 October 1997 (age 29)
- Place of birth: Fushun, Liaoning, China
- Height: 1.76 m (5 ft 9 in)
- Position: Full-back

Youth career
- Changchun Yatai
- 2013–2014: Shenyang Zhongze
- 2013–2014: → Loures (loan)
- 2015–2016: Loures

Senior career*
Years	Team	Apps	(Gls)
2016–2017	Loures	21	(1)
2018–2022	Hebei FC	58	(0)
2023–2025	Shanghai Shenhua	12	(0)
- * Club domestic league appearances and goals as of 25 August 2025

Cui Lin (Chinese: 崔麟; pinyin: Cuī lín; born 26 October 1997) is a Chinese professional footballer who plays as a full-back. His twin elder brother Cui Qi is also a footballer.

== Career ==
Cui Lin moved aboard in 2013 and joined Campeonato de Portugal side Loures. He was promoted to the first team in the summer of 2016. He made his senior debut on 28 August 2016, playing the whole match in a 2–1 away win against Real S.C. On 19 February 2017, he scored his first senior goal in a 5–1 away win over Fabril Barreiro.

On 28 February 2018, Cui transferred to Chinese Super League side Hebei China Fortune (later renamed as Hebei). On 24 April 2018, he made his debut for the club in a 4–0 away win over Suzhou Dongwu in the 2018 Chinese FA Cup, coming on as a substitute for Zhao Mingjian at the half time. He made his Super League debut four days later on 28 April 2018 in a 3–0 away win over Tianjin Quanjian, coming on for Xu Tianyuan at the 85th minute. After the game he would gradually go on to establish himself as a regular within the team. At the end of the 2022 Chinese Super League campaign he was part of the team that was relegated at the end of the campaign. On 7 April 2023, Hebei announced that operations were going to cease immediately due to financial difficulties.

On 11 April 2023, Cui joined top tier club Shanghai Shenhua for the start of the 2023 Chinese Super League campaign. He would make his debut for the club in a league game on 16 April 2023 against Shandong Taishan in a 1–0 victory.

== Career statistics ==
As of 16 April 2023.

Appearances and goals by club, season and competition
Club	Season	League			National Cup		Continental		Other		Total	
Club	Season	Division	Apps	Goals	Apps	Goals	Apps	Goals	Apps	Goals	Apps	Goals
Loures	2016–17	Campeonato de Portugal	21	1	1	0	-		-		22	1
Hebei China Fortune/ Hebei FC	2018	Chinese Super League	6	0	2	0	-		-		8	0
Hebei China Fortune/ Hebei FC	2019	Chinese Super League	6	0	1	0	-		-		7	0
Hebei China Fortune/ Hebei FC	2020	Chinese Super League	2	0	0	0	-		-		2	0
Hebei China Fortune/ Hebei FC	2021	Chinese Super League	20	0	0	0	-		-		20	0
Hebei China Fortune/ Hebei FC	2022	Chinese Super League	24	0	1	0	-		-		25	0
Hebei China Fortune/ Hebei FC	Total		58	0	4	0	0	0	0	0	62	0
Shanghai Shenhua	2023	Chinese Super League	1	0	0	0	-		-		1	0
Career total			80	1	5	0	0	0	0	0	85	1
