= Stanislav Alshevsky =

Russian ice hockey player (born 1991)

- Born: 9 May 1991 (age 33); Nizhnekamsk, Soviet Union
- Height: 5 ft 10 in (178 cm)
- Weight: 154 lb (70 kg; 11 st 0 lb)
- Position: Forward
- Shoots: Left
- VHL team Former teams: Neftyanik Almetievsk; Neftekhimik Nizhnekamsk; Admiral Vladivostok; Kunlun Red Star
- Playing career: 2011–present

Stanislav Alshevsky (born 9 May 1991) is a Russian professional ice hockey player. He is currently playing with Neftyanik Almetievsk of the Supreme Hockey League (VHL). He is a teammate with his twin brother, Yaroslav Alshevsky.

Alshevsky made his Kontinental Hockey League (KHL) debut playing with HC Neftekhimik Nizhnekamsk during the 2012–13 KHL season.
