= Santiago Villafañe =

Argentine footballer

Personal information
- Full name: Santiago Hernán Villafañe
- Date of birth: 19 May 1988 (age 38)
- Place of birth: Mar del Plata, Argentina
- Height: 1.79 m (5 ft 10 in)
- Positions: Right-back; centre-back

Youth career
- –2001: Club Deportivo Norte
- 2001–2007: Boca Juniors

Senior career*
Years	Team	Apps	(Gls)
2006–2011	Boca Juniors	7	(0)
2007–2009	→ Real Madrid Castilla (loan)	22	(0)
2011–2012	Independiente Rivadavia	11	(0)
2012–2014	Midtjylland	11	(0)
2014	Alimos	11	(0)
2015	Panthrakikos	4	(0)
2015	OFI		
2016	Colón	7	(0)
2016	RNK Split	1	(0)
2017	Montana	7	(0)
2017–2018	Ruch Chorzów	18	(0)
2019	Thesprotos	11	(0)
2020–2021	JJ Urquiza	20	(0)
- * Club domestic league appearances and goals

Santiago Hernán Villafañe (born 19 May 1988) is an Argentine former professional footballer who played as a defender.

== Career ==
=== Boca Juniors ===
Santiago Hernán Villafañe began his playing career in Argentina with Boca Juniors, with whom he debuted in the First Division. A predominantly left sided player, he is known for his tough tackling and speed.

=== Real Madrid Castilla ===
In 2007, he joined Real Madrid from Boca Juniors, where he played as a wingback or midfielder for Real Madrid Castilla. Villafañe trained with the first team on several occasions but did not play for Real Madrid in La Liga.

=== Boca Juniors, return ===
In 2009 Villafañe returned to Boca Juniors.

=== FC Midtjylland ===
In July 2012 he signed a five-year contract with the Danish Superliga-side FC Midtjylland.

=== RNK Split ===
In summer 2016, he signed for the Croatian club of RNK Split, in order to help the team to achieve the team's wish to win the Croatian First Football League.

=== Montana ===
On 23 February 2017, Villafañe signed with Bulgarian club Montana until the rest of the season.

=== Ruch Chorzów ===
On 18 July 2017, Villafañe signed a 1-year contract with Polish I liga side Ruch Chorzów with an option for a further year.

== Personal life ==
Santiago is the twin brother of the also footballer Nicolás Villafañe.
