= Louis Laing =

English footballer

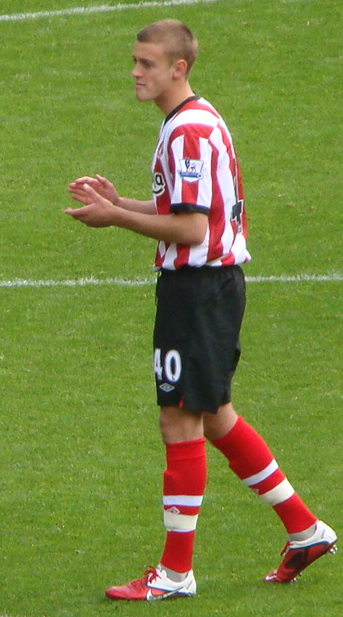
- Laing playing for Sunderland

Personal information
- Full name: Louis Mark Laing
- Date of birth: 6 March 1993 (age 33)
- Place of birth: Newcastle upon Tyne, England
- Position: Defender

Youth career
- 2009–2011: Sunderland

Senior career*
Years	Team	Apps	(Gls)
2011–2014	Sunderland	1	(0)
2012	→ Wycombe Wanderers (loan)	11	(0)
2014–2015	Nottingham Forest	0	(0)
2014	→ Notts County (loan)	10	(0)
2015	→ Motherwell (loan)	11	(1)
2015–2017	Motherwell	15	(1)
2016–2017	→ Notts County (loan)	21	(1)
2017	Inverness Caledonian Thistle	14	(0)
2017–2018	Hartlepool United	40	(1)
2018–2019	Blyth Spartans	18	(1)
2019–2021	Darlington	36	(0)
Total		178	(5)

International career
2008	England U16	3	(0)
2009–2010	England U17	9	(0)
2011	England U18	1	(0)
2010–2011	England U19	5	(0)
- * Club domestic league appearances and goals as of 15:59, 19 December 2022 (UTC)

Louis Mark Laing (born 6 March 1993) is an English former footballer who played as a defender. He started his career at Sunderland and also played for Wycombe Wanderers, Nottingham Forest, Notts County, Motherwell, Inverness Caledonian Thistle, Hartlepool United, Blyth Spartans and Darlington.

== Club career ==
=== Sunderland ===
Laing was born in Newcastle upon Tyne, and grew up supporting Newcastle United. Laing started at youth level with Montague B.C. before he joined Newcastle's arch-rivals Sunderland in summer 2009. In his first year at the Sunderland academy, he made 18 appearances, scoring once, despite injuries during the 2009–10 season.

Laing made his Sunderland debut on 14 May 2011, coming on as a late substitute for John Mensah in a 3–1 defeat at home to Wolverhampton Wanderers. Although manager Steve Bruce was normally keen to let young players out on loan to play first-team football, the Sunderland Echo speculated that Laing might "have a part to play" for his parent club.

On 16 January 2012, Laing signed for League One club Wycombe Wanderers on a one-month loan. On 21 January, he made his debut in a 3–0 win against Rochdale at Adams Park. The loan was extended until the end of the season.

On his return from loan, Laing signed a new contract with Sunderland. His next two seasons were overshadowed by injuries, and he was released at the end of the 2013–14 season.

=== Nottingham Forest ===
Despite interest from Blackburn Rovers, Newcastle United and Manchester United, Laing signed a one-year deal with Nottingham Forest.

Having only featured in Forest's reserves and under-21 sides, Laing joined Notts County on a one-month emergency loan on 12 September 2014. He made his County debut the next day in a 0–0 draw with Peterborough United. After helping the club keep four clean sheets in seven matches, Laing's loan spell with Notts County was extended to the maximum 93 days. After making ten appearances for the club, Laing's loan spell with Notts County came to an end, as he made his last appearance against Swindon Town on 13 December.

On 30 January 2015, Laing moved on loan to Motherwell until the end of the 2014–15 season. He made his debut the following day against St Johnstone, but was sent off after 25 minutes. Laing scored his first Motherwell goal in a 2–1 win over Inverness Caledonian Thistle on 28 February. He played in both legs of the Scottish Premiership play-off final as Motherwell maintained their top-flight status with a 6–1 win on aggregate against Rangers. At the end of the season, Laing returned to his parent club, although he said he hoped he would be able to come back to Motherwell.

Laing was released by Nottingham Forest at the end of the season, having never made an appearance for the club.

=== Motherwell ===
On 30 June 2015, Laing returned to Motherwell, signing a two-year contract with the club. In March 2016, Laing revealed that earlier in the season, while out of the first team at Motherwell, he had considered giving up football.

On 15 August 2016, Laing moved on loan to Notts County until 16 January 2017. He was released by Motherwell on 31 January.

=== Inverness ===
Laing signed for Inverness Caledonian Thistle on 16 February 2017 on a contract due to run until the end of the 2016–17 season.

=== Hartlepool United ===
Laing signed for Hartlepool United on 10 July 2017. His contract was terminated by mutual consent in October 2018; he made 40 league appearances for the club.

=== Blyth Spartans ===
Shortly after his release from Hartlepool, Laing signed for National League North club Blyth Spartans on 18 October.

=== Darlington ===
Laing signed for another National League North club, Darlington, in 2019.

== International career ==
Laing played for England at all levels from under-16 to under-19.

== Personal life ==
Laing now works for a financial adviser in Hexham.

== Career statistics ==
Appearances and goals by club, season and competition
Club	Season	League			National Cup (Note: Includes FA Cup, Scottish Cup)		League Cup (Note: Includes Football League Cup/EFL Cup, Scottish League Cup)		Other		Total	
Club	Season	Division	Apps	Goals	Apps	Goals	Apps	Goals	Apps	Goals	Apps	Goals
Sunderland	2010–11	Premier League	1	0	0	0	0	0	—		1	0
Sunderland	2011–12	Premier League	0	0	0	0	0	0	—		0	0
Sunderland	2012–13	Premier League	0	0	0	0	0	0	—		0	0
Sunderland	2013–14	Premier League	0	0	0	0	0	0	—		0	0
Sunderland	Total		1	0	0	0	0	0	—		1	0
Wycombe Wanderers (loan)	2011–12	League One	11	0	—		—		—		11	0
Nottingham Forest	2014–15	Championship	0	0	0	0	0	0	—		0	0
Notts County (loan)	2014–15	League One	10	0	0	0	—		2 (Note: Appearances in Football League Trophy)	0	12	0
Motherwell (loan)	2014–15	Scottish Premiership	11	1	—		—		2 (Note: Appearances in Premiership play-offs)	0	13	1
Motherwell	2015–16	Scottish Premiership	15	1	0	0	1	0	—		16	1
Motherwell	2016–17	Scottish Premiership	0	0	0	0	0	0	—		0	0
Motherwell	Total		26	2	0	0	1	0	2	0	29	2
Notts County (loan)	2016–17	League Two	21	1	3	1	—		3 (Note: Appearances in EFL Trophy)	0	27	2
Inverness Caledonian Thistle	2016–17	Scottish Premiership	14	0	0	0	—		—		14	0
Hartlepool United	2017–18	National League	39	1	2	0	—		1 (Note: Appearance(s) in FA Trophy)	0	42	1
Hartlepool United	2018–19	National League	1	0	—		—		—		1	0
Hartlepool United	Total		40	1	2	0	—		1	0	43	1
Blyth Spartans	2018–19	National League North	18	1	1	0	—		1	0	20	1
Darlington	2019–20	National League North	30	0	4	0	—		4	0	38	0
Darlington	2020–21	National League North	6	0	1	0	—		2	0	9	0
Darlington	Total		36	0	5	0	—		6	0	47	0
Career total			178	5	11	1	1	0	15	0	205	6
