= Simón Ramírez (footballer, born 1998) =

Chilean footballer

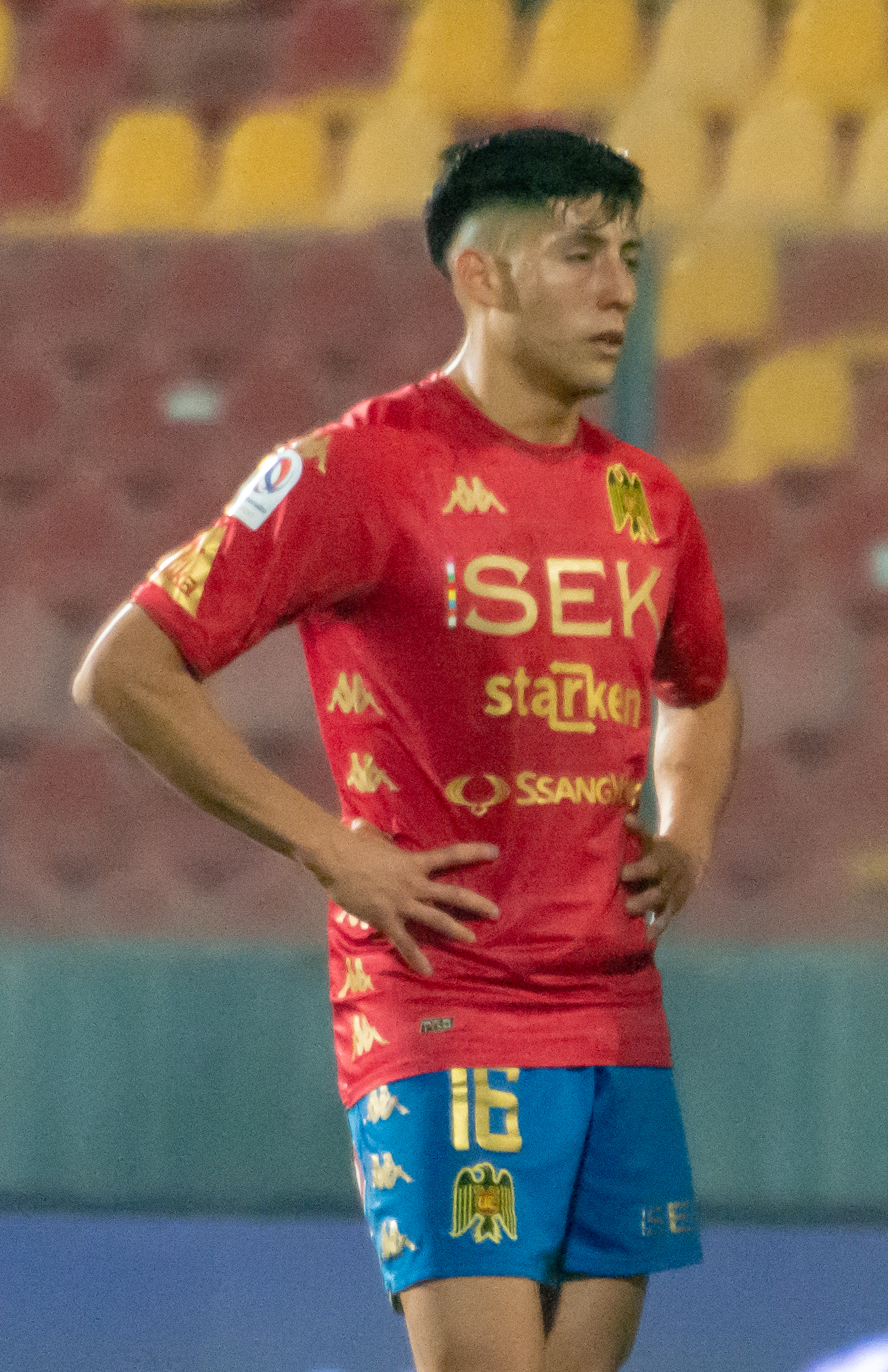
- Ramírez with Unión Española in 2023

Personal information
- Full name: Simón Alonso Ramírez Cuevas
- Date of birth: 3 November 1998 (age 28)
- Place of birth: Concepción, Chile
- Height: 1.78 m (5 ft 10 in)
- Position: Right-back

Team information
- Current team: Deportes Antofagasta

Youth career
- 2014–2016: Huachipato
- 2016–2017: Benfica

Senior career*
Years	Team	Apps	(Gls)
2016	Huachipato	18	(0)
2017–2019	Benfica B	24	(0)
2019	Belenenses	1	(0)
2020	Universidad de Concepción	30	(1)
2021–2022	Unión La Calera	21	(1)
2023–2025	Unión Española	59	(0)
2026–	Deportes Antofagasta	0	(0)

International career^{‡}
2015	Chile U17	5	(0)
- * Club domestic league appearances and goals as of 15 December 2025 ‡ National team caps and goals as of 23 July 2018

Simón Alonso Ramírez Cuevas (born 3 November 1998) is a Chilean professional footballer who plays as a right-back for Deportes Antofagasta.

== Career ==
Ramírez spent three seasons with Unión Española from 2023 to 2025.

In March 2026, Ramírez joined Deportes Antofagasta in the Primera B de Chile.

== Personal life ==
His twin brother, Antonio Ramírez, is also a professional footballer. Along with Simón, he has played for Huachipato, Chile U17 and Universidad de Concepción.
