= Garrett Festerling =

Canadian ice hockey player

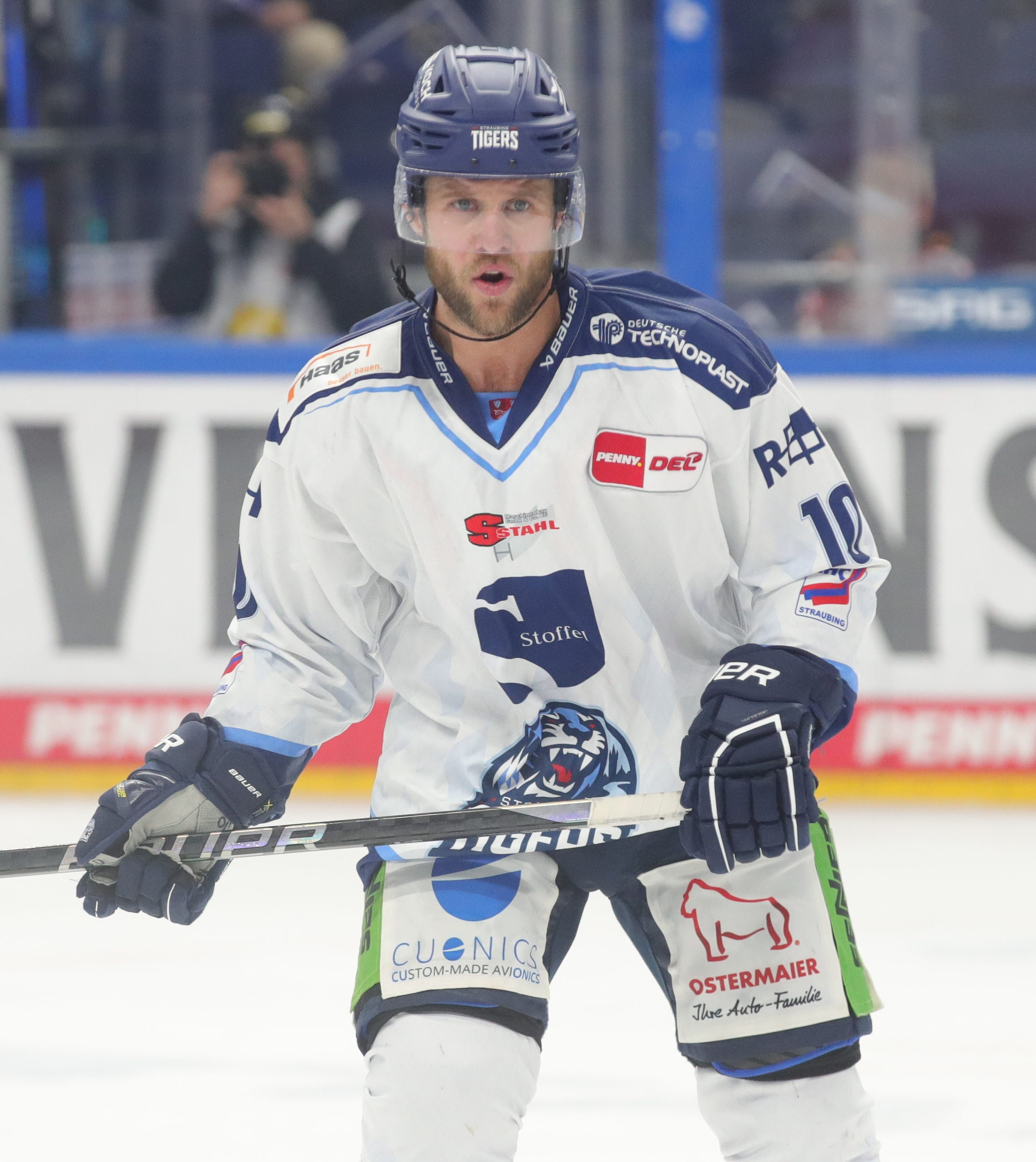
- Born: March 3, 1986 (age 39) Quesnel, British Columbia, Canada
- Height: 5 ft 10 in (178 cm)
- Weight: 172 lb (78 kg; 12 st 4 lb)
- Position: Center
- Shoots: Right
- DEL team Former teams: Free Agent; Hannover Scorpions; Hamburg Freezers; Adler Mannheim; Grizzlys Wolfsburg; Straubing Tigers
- National team: Germany
- NHL draft: Undrafted
- Playing career: 2007–present

Garrett Festerling (born March 3, 1986) is a professional ice hockey forward who is currently an unrestricted free agent. He most recently played under contract with the Straubing Tigers of the Deutsche Eishockey Liga (DEL). He is a dual citizen of Canada and Germany.

== Playing career ==
Festerling played for the Vernon Vipers of the BCHL before making the move to the WHL. He first represented the Portland Winter Hawks and then joined the Regina Pats.

In 2007, Festerling headed over the pond to play professionally in Germany and spent the 2007-08 season with EV Füssen, a team from the third division in Germany. Festerling excelled as the league's leading scorer, recording 50 goals and 70 assists in 45 games, while being named Oberliga Player of the Year by eishockeynews.de.

His outstanding performances with the Füssen team drew the attention of teams from the German elite league Deutsche Eishockey Liga (DEL). Festerling eventually signed with the Hannover Scorpions in 2008, joining the DEL side on a three-year contract. In his second year in Hannover, Festerling saw action in 18 contests en route to winning the German championship with the Scorpions.

He left the team after the championship season to pursue more playing time and joined the Hamburg Freezers for the 2010–11 campaign. Festerling developed into a key member of the Freezers’ squad and was joined by his twin brother Brett who signed with the Freezers in April 2014. Garrett inked a four-year contract extension with the Freezers in June 2014. The Freezers folded in May 2016, which made Festerling a free agent. Only a couple of days later, he was picked up by another DEL team, Adler Mannheim. He signed a three-year deal with the Adler organization.

During the final season of his contract with Adler in 2018–19, Festerling signed in advance for the 2019–20 season, agreeing to a two-year contract with rival club Grizzlys Wolfsburg on January 19, 2019. He proceeded to contribute offensively with Adler, enjoying his most productive season with the club with 33 points in 52 games and helping claim the DEL championship in the playoffs.

On May 5, 2022, Festerling was signed to a one-year contract in joining his fifth DEL club, Straubing Tigers, for the 2022–23 season.

== International play ==
In December 2011, Festerling made his debut on the German Men's National Team in an exhibition game against Russia.

== Personal life ==
His twin brother Brett Festerling previously played in the Winnipeg Jets organization of the National Hockey League.

Festerling's grandfather emigrated from Hamburg, Germany, to Canada after World War II.

== Career statistics ==
=== Regular season and playoffs ===
			Regular season					Playoffs
Season	Team	League	GP	G	A	Pts	PIM	GP	G	A	Pts	PIM
2002–03	Vernon Vipers	BCHL	43	7	5	12	10	—	—	—	—	—
2003–04	Portland Winterhawks	WHL	37	4	12	16	37	5	0	1	1	0
2004–05	Portland Winterhawks	WHL	72	14	20	34	45	7	1	1	2	4
2005–06	Regina Pats	WHL	72	22	36	58	51	6	3	4	7	6
2006–07	Regina Pats	WHL	67	22	51	73	46	10	5	7	12	16
2006–07	Oklahoma City Blazers	CHL	—	—	—	—	—	1	0	0	0	0
2007–08	EV Füssen	3.GBun	45	50	70	120	46	11	5	8	13	16
2008–09	Hannover Scorpions	DEL	43	1	4	5	14	8	0	2	2	4
2009–10	Hannover Scorpions	DEL	18	2	3	5	2	11	1	0	1	0
2010–11	Hamburg Freezers	DEL	50	4	15	19	18	—	—	—	—	—
2011–12	Hamburg Freezers	DEL	52	11	22	33	40	5	0	0	0	14
2012–13	Hamburg Freezers	DEL	52	14	22	36	24	6	2	1	3	0
2013–14	Hamburg Freezers	DEL	52	8	29	37	14	12	4	3	7	10
2014–15	Hamburg Freezers	DEL	40	14	18	32	45	7	1	2	3	6
2015–16	Hamburg Freezers	DEL	30	7	16	23	33	—	—	—	—	—
2016–17	Adler Mannheim	DEL	37	11	16	27	29	7	1	1	2	2
2017–18	Adler Mannheim	DEL	45	10	19	29	4	10	2	4	6	2
2018–19	Adler Mannheim	DEL	52	16	17	33	24	14	2	6	8	8
2019–20	Grizzlys Wolfsburg	DEL	52	13	22	35	14	—	—	—	—	—
2020–21	Grizzlys Wolfsburg	DEL	32	8	11	19	14	9	3	2	5	0
2021–22	Grizzlys Wolfsburg	DEL	51	4	14	18	6	8	0	3	3	12
2022–23	Straubing Tigers	DEL	30	6	4	10	31	—	—	—	—	—
DEL totals			636	129	232	361	312	97	16	24	40	58

=== International ===
Year	Team	Event	Result	GP	G	A	Pts	PIM
2013	Germany	OGQ	NQ	3	0	1	1	0
Senior totals				3	0	1	1	0

== Awards and honours ==
Award	Year
DEL
Champion (Hannover Scorpions)	2010
Champion (Adler Mannheim)	2019
