= Nicolás Villafañe =

Argentine footballer (born 1988)

Personal information
- Full name: Nicolás Villafañe
- Date of birth: 19 May 1988 (age 38)
- Place of birth: Mar del Plata, Argentina
- Height: 1.78 m (5 ft 10 in)
- Position: Midfielder

Youth career
- 2001–2009: Boca Juniors

Senior career*
Years	Team	Apps	(Gls)
2008–2009	Boca Juniors	0	(0)
2010	Figline	10	(2)
2011	Olaria	4	(0)
2012	San Marcos	31	(4)
2013	Santiago Morning	10	(0)
2013	Atlético Sanluqueño	13	(0)
2014	Panachaiki	10	(3)
2014–2015	Episkopi	30	(5)
2015	Panelefsiniakos	8	(0)
2016	Sparti		
2016–2017	AEZ Zakakiou	9	(1)
2017	Estudiantes de Mérida	10	(0)
2017	Asteras Vlachioti		
2018	Cooma Tigers		
2018	AEZ Zakakiou	11	(2)
2019	Ierapetra		
2019–2020	AO Diavolitsiou		
2020	Fokikos		
2021–2022	CD Toledo	9	(1)
2022–2023	Estudiantes Unidos	4	(0)
- * Club domestic league appearances and goals

Nicolás Gastón Villafañe (born May 19, 1988, in Buenos Aires, Argentina) is an Argentine former footballer who played as a midfielder.

== Teams ==
- (Argentina) Boca Juniors 2008–2009
- (Italy) Figline 2010
- (Brazil) Olaria 2011
- (Chile) San Marcos de Arica 2012
- (Chile) Santiago Morning 2013
- (Spain) Atlético Sanluqueño 2013
- (Greece) Panachaiki 2014
- (Greece) Episkopi 2014–2015
- (Greece) Panelefsiniakos 2015
- (Greece) Sparti 2016
- (Cyprus) AEZ Zakakiou 2016–2017
- (Venezuela) Estudiantes de Mérida 2017
- (Greece) Asteras Vlachioti 2017
- (Australia) Cooma 2018
- (Cyprus) AEZ Zakakiou 2018
- (Greece) Ierapetra 2019
- (Greece) AO Diavolitsiou 2019–2020
- (Greece) Fokikos 2020
- (Spain) CD Toledo 2021–2022
- (Argentina) Estudiantes Unidos 2022–2023

== Personal life ==
Nicolás is the twin brother of the also footballer Santiago Villafañe.
