= Brett Festerling =

Canadian ice hockey player (born 1986)

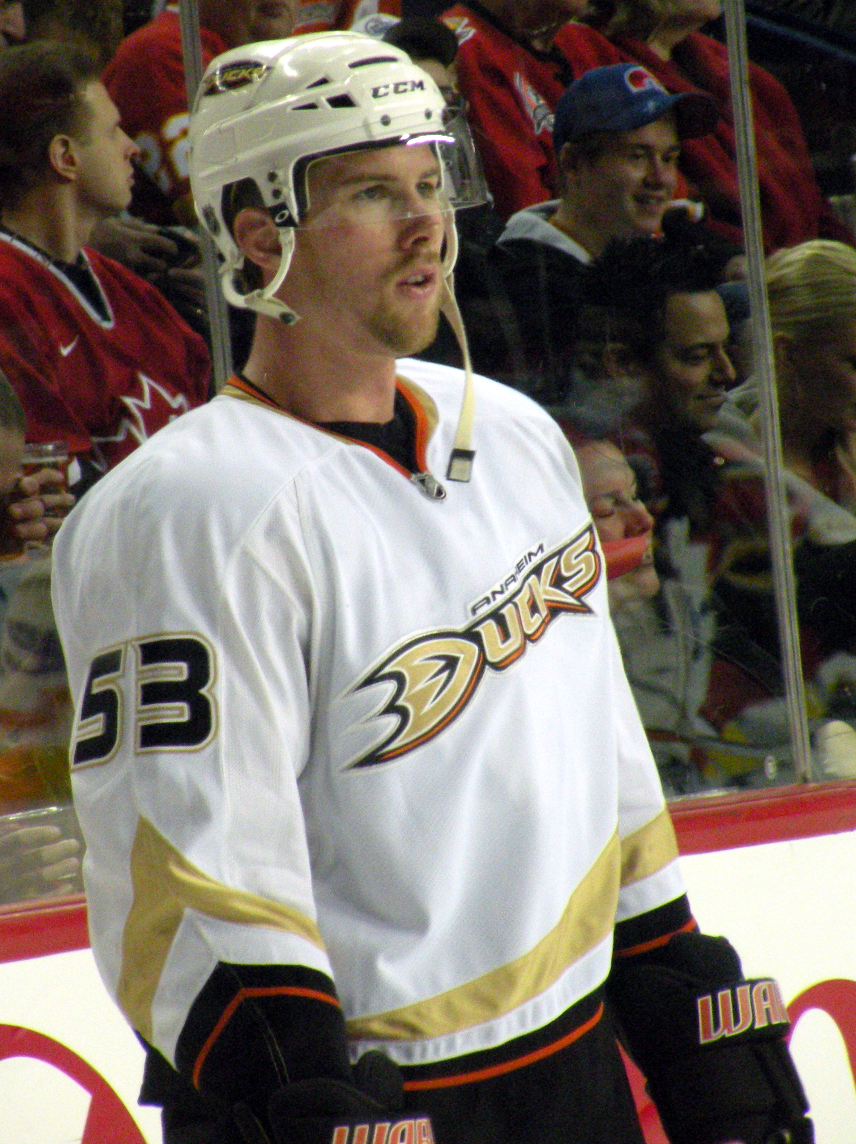
- Born: March 3, 1986 (age 40) Quesnel, British Columbia, Canada
- Height: 6 ft 1 in (185 cm)
- Weight: 210 lb (95 kg; 15 st 0 lb)
- Position: Defence
- Shoots: Left
- team Former teams: Free Agent; Anaheim Ducks; Winnipeg Jets; Thomas Sabo Ice Tigers; Hamburg Freezers
- NHL draft: Undrafted
- Playing career: 2007–present

Brett Festerling (born March 3, 1986) is a Canadian professional ice hockey defenceman and hockey broadcaster. He most recently played under contract with the then Thomas Sabo Ice Tigers in the German Deutsche Eishockey Liga (DEL), and has transitioned to analysis for the Seattle Kraken. His twin brother Garrett also plays hockey in the DEL and is under contract with Grizzlys Wolfsburg.

== Playing career ==
Known primarily as a defensive defenceman, Festerling began his major junior career with the Tri-City Americans of the Western Hockey League (WHL), initially appearing in three games in 2001–02. He was the Americans' fifth overall pick in the 2001 WHL Bantam Draft. After breaking his wrist in his NHL draft-eligible year, Festerling was traded midway through the 2004–05 season to the Vancouver Giants (along with forward Ryan Costanzo) in exchange for forward Shaun Vey and defenceman Mike McDonald.

After winning the President's Cup as WHL champions with the Giants in 2006 and subsequently appearing in the Memorial Cup, Festerling was named team captain for the 2006–07 season. Festerling put up a major junior career-high 21 points in 70 games as captain. However, the Giants were defeated in the WHL finals by the Medicine Hat Tigers in seven games. As 2007 Memorial Cup hosts, the Giants met the Tigers in the final game once more and captured the franchise's first CHL title with a 3–1 victory.

Undrafted by a National Hockey League (NHL) team, Festerling was invited to the Mighty Ducks of Anaheim's training camp ahead of the 2005–06 and was subsequently signed to a three-year, entry-level contract. Coming off his Memorial Cup victory with the Giants, he was assigned to the Ducks' minor league affiliate, the Portland Pirates of the American Hockey League (AHL), for the 2007–08 season. He posted 14 points in his first professional season.

Festerling started the 2008–09 season with the Iowa Chops. When Ducks defenceman François Beauchemin was placed on the long-term injured reserve with a knee injury, Festerling was called up by Anaheim. He made his NHL debut in a 2–0 win against the Los Angeles Kings on November 16, 2008, logging 17 minutes of ice-time paired with Scott Niedermayer. He played 40 games total in his NHL rookie season, recording five assists. In the off-season, on August 20, 2009, he signed a two-year contract extension with Anaheim.

On October 14, 2010, Festerling was demoted to the Ducks' new AHL affiliate, the Syracuse Crunch. After starting the 2010–11 season with the Crunch, on December 31, 2010, he was traded (along with the Ducks' fifth-round pick in the 2012 NHL entry draft) to the Montreal Canadiens in exchange for Maxim Lapierre. Festerling was then immediately assigned to the Canadiens' AHL affiliate, the Hamilton Bulldogs.

On February 28, 2011, Festerling was traded to the Atlanta Thrashers in exchange for goaltender Drew MacIntyre.

On July 23, 2012, Festerling signed with the Nürnberg Ice Tigers of the German top-flight Deutsche Eishockey Liga (DEL). In two seasons with the Ice Tigers, he provided a physical defensive presence and totalled 20 points in 72 games.

On April 24, 2014, Festerling signed with DEL rivals Hamburg Freezers on a four-year contract. The move re-united him with twin brother Garrett, who had played with Hamburg since 2010. After the Freezers folded in May 2016, Festerling became a free agent. On June 24, 2016, he returned for a second stint in Nürnberg with the Ice Tigers, where he played for four more seasons.

Festerling provided in-game analysis on the Vancouver Canucks' radio affiliate, Sportsnet 650 AM in Vancouver, and is now an on-air analyst for the Kraken Hockey Network.

== Career statistics ==
| | | | Regular season | | | | | Playoffs |
| Season | Team | League | GP | G | A | Pts | PIM | GP | G | A | Pts | PIM |
|---|---|---|---|---|---|---|---|---|---|---|---|---|
| 2001–02 | Tri-City Americans | WHL | 3 | 0 | 0 | 0 | 0 | — | — | — | — | — |
| 2002–03 | Tri-City Americans | WHL | 55 | 3 | 8 | 11 | 26 | — | — | — | — | — |
| 2003–04 | Tri-City Americans | WHL | 54 | 1 | 9 | 10 | 34 | 11 | 1 | 1 | 2 | 2 |
| 2004–05 | Tri-City Americans | WHL | 33 | 3 | 11 | 14 | 20 | — | — | — | — | — |
| 2004–05 | Vancouver Giants | WHL | 32 | 2 | 4 | 6 | 10 | 5 | 0 | 0 | 0 | 6 |
| 2005–06 | Vancouver Giants | WHL | 67 | 1 | 6 | 7 | 35 | 18 | 0 | 1 | 1 | 10 |
| 2006–07 | Vancouver Giants | WHL | 70 | 5 | 16 | 21 | 80 | 22 | 1 | 6 | 7 | 24 |
| 2007–08 | Portland Pirates | AHL | 74 | 3 | 11 | 14 | 64 | 15 | 1 | 3 | 4 | 6 |
| 2008–09 | Iowa Chops | AHL | 34 | 0 | 7 | 7 | 31 | — | — | — | — | — |
| 2008–09 | Anaheim Ducks | NHL | 40 | 0 | 5 | 5 | 18 | 1 | 0 | 0 | 0 | 0 |
| 2009–10 | San Antonio Rampage | AHL | 17 | 0 | 1 | 1 | 19 | — | — | — | — | — |
| 2009–10 | Toronto Marlies | AHL | 11 | 0 | 4 | 4 | 8 | — | — | — | — | — |
| 2009–10 | Anaheim Ducks | NHL | 42 | 0 | 3 | 3 | 15 | — | — | — | — | — |
| 2010–11 | Syracuse Crunch | AHL | 32 | 3 | 9 | 12 | 41 | — | — | — | — | — |
| 2010–11 | Anaheim Ducks | NHL | 1 | 0 | 0 | 0 | 0 | — | — | — | — | — |
| 2010–11 | Hamilton Bulldogs | AHL | 16 | 0 | 4 | 4 | 15 | — | — | — | — | — |
| 2010–11 | Chicago Wolves | AHL | 5 | 0 | 0 | 0 | 0 | — | — | — | — | — |
| 2011–12 | St. John's IceCaps | AHL | 52 | 3 | 15 | 18 | 50 | 14 | 0 | 2 | 2 | 10 |
| 2011–12 | Winnipeg Jets | NHL | 5 | 0 | 0 | 0 | 2 | — | — | — | — | — |
| 2012–13 | Thomas Sabo Ice Tigers | DEL | 41 | 1 | 8 | 9 | 50 | 3 | 0 | 0 | 0 | 10 |
| 2013–14 | Thomas Sabo Ice Tigers | DEL | 31 | 2 | 9 | 11 | 83 | 6 | 0 | 0 | 0 | 4 |
| 2014–15 | Hamburg Freezers | DEL | 44 | 0 | 6 | 6 | 80 | 2 | 0 | 0 | 0 | 0 |
| 2015–16 | Hamburg Freezers | DEL | 18 | 0 | 1 | 1 | 22 | — | — | — | — | — |
| 2016–17 | Thomas Sabo Ice Tigers | DEL | 50 | 2 | 11 | 13 | 46 | 13 | 0 | 1 | 1 | 4 |
| 2017–18 | Thomas Sabo Ice Tigers | DEL | 43 | 1 | 4 | 5 | 44 | 12 | 0 | 0 | 0 | 4 |
| 2018–19 | Thomas Sabo Ice Tigers | DEL | 39 | 0 | 4 | 4 | 32 | — | — | — | — | — |
| 2019–20 | Thomas Sabo Ice Tigers | DEL | 41 | 2 | 12 | 14 | 18 | — | — | — | — | — |
| NHL totals | | | 88 | 0 | 8 | 8 | 35 | 1 | 0 | 0 | 0 | 0 |
