= Ben Hall (footballer, born 1997) =

Northern Irish footballer

Personal information
- Full name: Ben Hall
- Date of birth: 16 January 1997 (age 29)
- Place of birth: Enniskillen, Northern Ireland
- Height: 1.85 m (6 ft 1 in)
- Position: Defender

Team information
- Current team: Linfield
- Number: 15

Youth career
- 2012–2013: Dungannon Swifts
- 2013–2015: Motherwell

Senior career*
Years	Team	Apps	(Gls)
2015–2016	Motherwell	18	(1)
2016–2019	Brighton & Hove Albion	0	(0)
2018–2019	→ Notts County (loan)	11	(0)
2019	Partick Thistle	2	(0)
2020–2022	Falkirk	40	(4)
2022–	Linfield	92	(4)

International career^{‡}
	Northern Ireland U15	2	(0)
	Northern Ireland U16	1	(0)
2013	Northern Ireland U17	2	(0)
2015–2016	Northern Ireland U19	5	(0)
2017–2018	Northern Ireland U21	3	(0)
- * Club domestic league appearances and goals as of 29 April 2026 ‡ National team caps and goals as of 20:47, 26 March 2018 (UTC)

Ben Hall (born 16 January 1997) is a Northern Irish footballer who plays as a defender for NIFL Premiership side Linfield.

== Club career ==
=== Motherwell ===
Born in Enniskillen, Hall started his career at Mountjoy United then moved to Irish League side Dungannon Swifts. In the summer of 2013, Hall signed a two-year contract with Scottish Premiership club Motherwell. In his first two seasons, Hall had become a regular in the Motherwell Under-20 setup. Hall made a surprise first team debut on 12 December 2015, starting at centre-back in a 3–1 home win over Dundee. He scored his first Motherwell goal on 30 December 2015, in a 2–0 win over St Johnstone.

=== Brighton & Hove Albion ===
On 14 June 2016, Hall signed a two-year contract with Brighton & Hove Albion FC, initially linking up with the Seagulls' U21 team. He was released from Brighton at the end of the 2018–19 season. In January 2018, he went on loan to Notts County until the end of the season, in order to get more experience of senior football. On 14 May 2018, Brighton announced that they were taking up the option of extending his contract by another year.

=== Partick Thistle ===
Hall signed a short-term contract with Partick Thistle in August 2019.

=== Falkirk ===
Hall moved to Falkirk in January 2020. He made his debut for the Bairns on 25 January 2020, scoring two goals in the 6-0 win over Forfar Athletic. Ben left Falkirk by mutual consent on the 31st January 2022.

=== Linfield ===
On the same day he left Falkirk, it was reported that Hall had returned to Northern Ireland, signing a two-and-a-half-year contract with Linfield.

== International career ==
Hall has appeared for the Northern Ireland, at every age level from Under-15 to Under-21.

== Career statistics ==
=== Club ===
As of 9 August 2024

Appearances and goals by club, season and competition
Club	Season	League			National Cup		League Cup		Continental		Other		Total	
Club	Season	Division	Apps	Goals	Apps	Goals	Apps	Goals	Apps	Goals	Apps	Goals	Apps	Goals
Motherwell	2015-16	Scottish Premiership	18	1	1	0	—		—		—		19	1
Brighton & Hove Albion U23	2016-17	—			—		—		—		3 (Note: Appearance(s) in EFL Trophy)	0	3	0
Notts County (loan)	2017-18	League Two	11	0	—		—		—		—		11	0
Notts County (loan)	2018-19	League Two	0	0	0	0	—		—		0	0	0	0
Notts County (loan)	Total		11	0	0	0	—		—		0	0	11	0
Partick Thistle	2019-20	Scottish Championship	2	0	1	0	0	0	—		2 (Note: Appearance(s) in Scottish Challenge Cup)	0	5	0
Falkirk	2019-20	Scottish League One	6	2	0	0	—		—		—		6	2
Falkirk	2020-21	Scottish League One	16	2	1	0	4	0	—		—		21	2
Falkirk	2021-22	Scottish League One	18	0	1	0	1	0	—		2	0	22	0
Falkirk	Total		40	4	2	0	5	0	—		2	0	49	4
Linfield	2021-22	NIFL Premiership	11	1	1	0	—		—		—		12	1
Linfield	2022-23	NIFL Premiership	2	0	1	0	0	0	7 (Note: Four appearances in UEFA Champions League, One appearance in UEFA Europa League, Two appearances in UEFA Europa Conference League)	0	—		10	0
Linfield	2023-24	NIFL Premiership	34	2	3	0	4	1	4 (Note: Appearance(s) in UEFA Europa Conference League)	1	—		45	4
Linfield	2024-25	NIFL Premiership	—		—		—		0	0	—		0	0
Linfield	Total		47	3	5	0	4	1	11	1	—		67	5
Career Total			118	8	9	0	9	1	11	1	7	0	154	10
