= IK Våg =

Norwegian sports club

Football logo.

Idrettsklubben Våg is a Norwegian sports club from Vågsbygd in Kristiansand.

It has sections for association football, team handball, badminton and athletics. The club was founded on 12 January 1938, and the club colors are green and white.

The women's handball team played until January 2025 in the highest Norwegian league where they had to withdraw due bankruptcy. The club had also won several champions leagues. The twin sisters and international handballstars Kristine Lunde-Borgersen and Katrine Lunde originally played for "Våg Vipers". The club later changed its name to "Vipers Kristiansand", and which the club was called until its dissolution in 2025.

The Norwegian heptathlete Ida Marcussen represents IK Våg, after changing in 2005 after a disagreement with her club Kristiansands IF.

The football section is called Våg FK, and played in the Third Division from 1997 to 2010.
