= Ignacio Jeraldino =

Chilean footballer (born 1995)

Personal information
- Full name: Ignacio Alejandro Jeraldino Jil
- Date of birth: 6 December 1995 (age 30)
- Place of birth: Llay-Llay, Chile
- Height: 1.80 m (5 ft 11 in)
- Position: Striker

Team information
- Current team: Ñublense (on loan from Unión Española)

Youth career
- Unión San Felipe

Senior career*
Years	Team	Apps	(Gls)
2011–2017	Unión San Felipe	65	(13)
2012	Unión San Felipe B	16	(4)
2014–2015	→ Parma (loan)	0	(0)
2015–2016	→ Unión La Calera (loan)	20	(1)
2017–2019	Audax Italiano	57	(19)
2020	Atlas	26	(3)
2021–2023	Santos Laguna	36	(1)
2022	→ Coquimbo Unido (loan)	14	(4)
2023	→ Sporting Gijón (loan)	8	(0)
2023–2024	Sporting Gijón	3	(0)
2024–2025	Audax Italiano	29	(12)
2025–	Unión Española	27	(6)
2026–	→ Ñublense (loan)	0	(0)

International career^{‡}
2015	Chile U20	4	(0)
2018–	Chile	4	(0)
- * Club domestic league appearances and goals as of 19 January 2026 ‡ National team caps and goals as of 15 October 2018 (UTC)

Ignacio Alejandro Jeraldino Jil (born 6 December 1995) is a Chilean professional footballer who plays as a striker for Ñublense on loan from Unión Española.

== Club career ==
In February 2015 Jeraldino joined on loan from Unión San Felipe to Italian club Parma of the Serie A, but he failed to complete his move to Europe after the club's bankruptcy.

On 7 December 2019, Jeraldino joined to Mexican club Atlas from Audax Italiano.

In 2022, he played on loan at Coquimbo Unido.

In 2023, he moved to Spain and joined Sporting Gijón on loan. In June 2023, he renewed his contract on a deal for three seasons, but it was rescinded in January 2024.

Back in Chile, Jeraldino rejoined Audax Italiano.

In 2025, Jeraldino ended his contract with Audax Italiano and signed with Unión Española. On 19 January 2026, he was loaned out to Ñublense.

== Personal life ==
His twin brother Juan is also a footballer.

Due to his Italian heritage, he holds Italian passport.
