= Antonio Ramírez (footballer) =

Chilean footballer

Personal information
- Full name: Antonio Esteban Ramírez Cuevas
- Date of birth: 3 November 1998 (age 27)
- Place of birth: Concepción, Chile
- Height: 1.78 m (5 ft 10 in)
- Position: Winger

Team information
- Current team: Curicó Unido
- Number: 20

Youth career
- Huachipato

Senior career*
Years	Team	Apps	(Gls)
2016–2018	Huachipato	0	(0)
2018–2019	Universidad de Concepción	5	(0)
2019	Naval	1	(0)
2020–2022	Universidad de Concepción	26	(1)
2023–2024	Fernández Vial	37	(4)
2026–	Curicó Unido	0	(0)

International career
2015	Chile U17	3	(0)
- * Club domestic league appearances and goals as of 26 January 2026

Antonio Esteban Ramírez Cuevas (3 November 1998) is a Chilean footballer who plays as a winger for Curicó Unido.

== Club career ==
A product of Huachipato, Ramírez moved to Universidad de Concepción in the second half of 2018 in the Chilean Primera División. After a stint with Naval, he rejoined Universidad de Concepción in 2020 until the end of 2022.

In 2023 and 2024, Ramírez played for Fernández Vial.

After a trial, Ramírez signed with Curicó Unido on 23 January 2026.

== International career ==
Ramírez represented Chile at under-17 level in the 2015 South American Championship.

== Personal life ==
His twin brother, Simón, is also a professional footballer. They coincided in Huachipato, Chile U17 and Universidad de Concepción.
