= Juan Jeraldino =

Chilean footballer (born 1995)

Personal information
- Full name: Juan Gabriel Jeraldino Jil
- Date of birth: 6 December 1995 (age 30)
- Place of birth: Llay-Llay, Chile
- Height: 1.80 m (5 ft 11 in)
- Position: Forward

Youth career
- Unión San Felipe

Senior career*
Years	Team	Apps	(Gls)
2013–2018	Unión San Felipe	71	(0)
2018	Deportes Vallenar	8	(0)
2019	Deportes Rengo	–	(–)
2020–2021	Colchagua	18	(1)
Total		97	(1)
- * Club domestic league appearances and goals

Juan Gabriel Jeraldino Jil (born 6 December 1995) is a Chilean former footballer who played as a forward. He has played for Colchagua and Deportes Rengo in the Segunda División Profesional de Chile.

== Personal life ==
His twin brother, Ignacio, is a Chilean international footballer. They are of Italian descent.
