= Cui Qi (footballer, born 1997) =

Chinese association football player

Personal information
- Date of birth: 26 October 1997 (age 29)
- Place of birth: Fushun, Liaoning, China
- Height: 1.80 m (5 ft 11 in)
- Position: Full-back

Team information
- Current team: Yunnan Yukun
- Number: 35

Youth career
- –2015: Changchun Yatai
- 2015–2016: Loures

Senior career*
Years	Team	Apps	(Gls)
2016–2017	Tourizense	29	(0)
2018	Cova da Piedade	0	(0)
2018–2019	Loures	8	(0)
2019–2024	Changchun Yatai	82	(0)
2025	Dalian Yingbo	5	(0)
2026	Palamós CF		
2026–	Yunnan Yukun	0	(0)
- * Club domestic league appearances and goals as of 26 August 2025

Cui Qi (Chinese: 崔麒; pinyin: Cuī Qí; born 26 October 1997) is a Chinese footballer currently playing as a full-back for Yunnan Yukun. He is the twin brother of fellow footballer Cui Lin.

== Club career ==
Cui Qi along with his younger twin brother would play for the Changchun Yatai youth team before going on to training camps in Portugal before joining Campeonato de Portugal side Tourizense. He would immediately be promoted to the senior team and go on to make his debut on 21 August 2016 in a league game against Mortágua in a 1-1 draw. After a personally successful spell with the club where he established himself as regular within the team he would move to second tier club Cova da Piedade and then Loures before returning back Changchun Yatai.

On 12 September 2020 he would make his debut in the first league game for the club of the season that ended in a 2-1 victory against Heilongjiang Lava Spring. He would go on to establish himself as a vital member of the team and at the end of the 2020 league campaign he would go on to win the division title with the club. He would go on to make his top tier Chinese Super League debut on 17 May 2021 against Shanghai Shenhua in a 1-0 victory.

On 2 July 2026, Cui joined Chinese Super League side Yunnan Yukun.

== Career statistics ==
As of 31 December 2023.

Club	Season	League			Cup		Continental		Other		Total	
Club	Season	Division	Apps	Goals	Apps	Goals	Apps	Goals	Apps	Goals	Apps	Goals
Tourizense	2016–17	Campeonato de Portugal	29	0	0	0	–		–		29	0
Cova da Piedade	2018–19	LigaPro	0	0	0	0	–		–		0	0
Loures	2018–19	Campeonato de Portugal	8	0	3	0	–		–		8	0
Changchun Yatai	2019	China League One	0	0	0	0	–		–		0	0
Changchun Yatai	2020	China League One	15	0	2	0	–		–		17	0
Changchun Yatai	2021	Chinese Super League	14	0	1	0	–		–		15	0
Changchun Yatai	2022	Chinese Super League	30	0	0	0	–		–		19	0
Changchun Yatai	2023	Chinese Super League	23	0	1	0	–		–		24	0
Changchun Yatai	Total		82	0	4	0	0	0	0	0	86	0
Career total			119	0	7	0	0	0	0	0	126	0

== Honours ==
=== Club ===
Changchun Yatai

- China League One: 2020.
