= Kristiansands IF =

Norwegian sports club

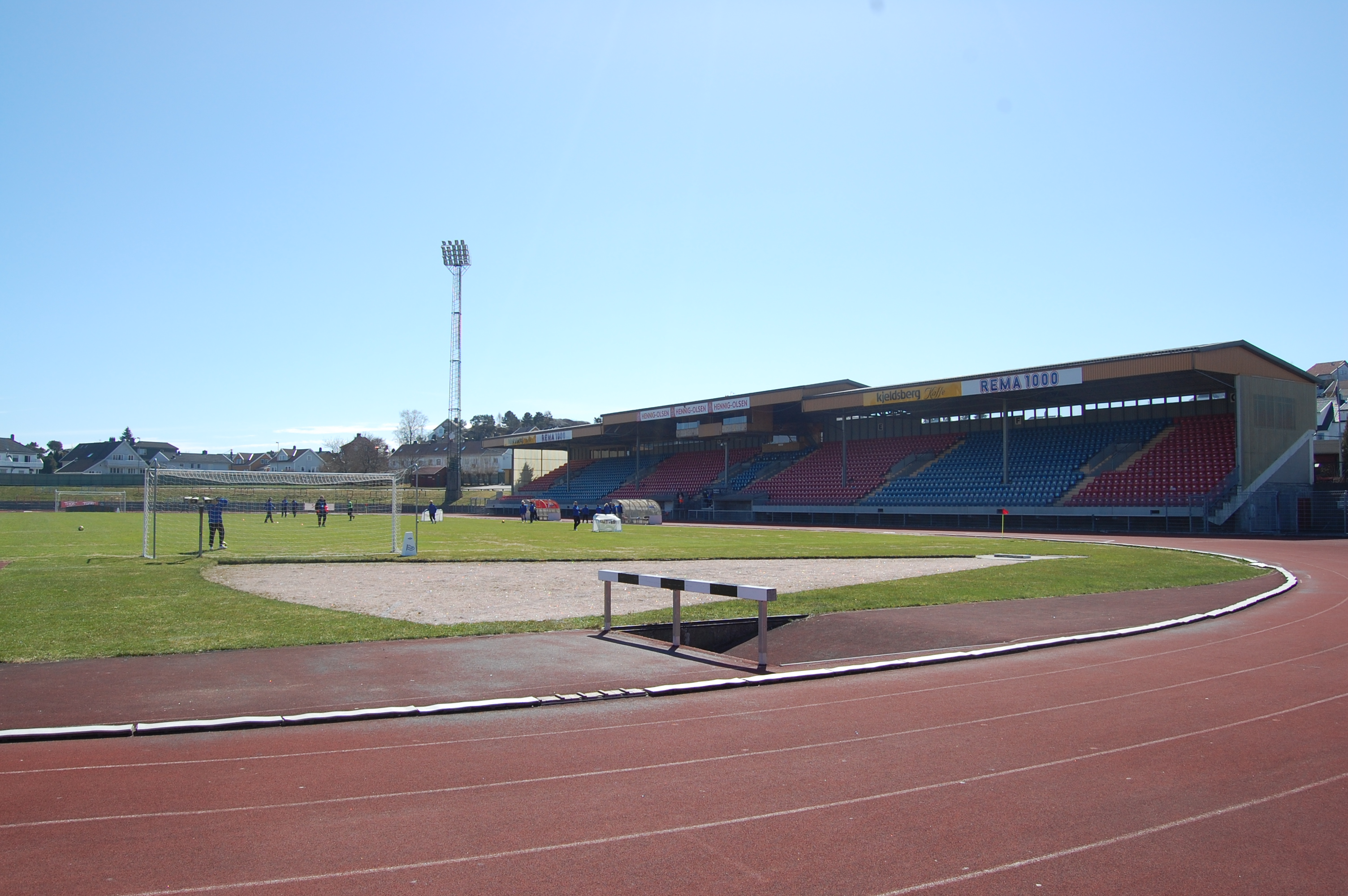
- Full name: Kristiansands Idrettsforening
- Founded: January 19, 1921; 105 years ago
- Ground: Kristiansand Stadion; Kristiansand

Kristiansands Idrettsforening, often just called KIF, is a Norwegian sports club from Kristiansand, founded in 1921. It has sections for athletics and handball. The handball team plays in top Norwegian division REMA 1000-Ligaen.

The athletics team uses the stadium Kristiansand Stadion.

Its most prominent member is Andreas Thorkildsen, 2004 Olympic champion in javelin throw. Haakon Tranberg, 1946 European Championships silver medalist and Kristen Fløgstad, Norwegian record holder in long jump with 8.02 metres and 1972 Olympic participant, also represented Kristiansand.

== Handball Department ==
The handball department was founded in 1945 as a women's handball team. During the German occupation of Norway the team played illegally, and after the end of the second world war, a men's and a women's handball team were officially founded. In 1980-81 they won the Norwegian Men's Handball Cup.

The women's team was later transferred to IK Våg, and became Vipers Kristiansand. They have later won several Norwegian Women's Championship as well as the 2022-23 Women's EHF Champions League.

=== Notable former players ===
- (Norway) Steinar Ege
- (Norway) Preben Vildalen
- (Norway) André Jørgensen
- (Denmark) Keld Nielsen
