= 2016–17 Aberdeen F.C. season =

Aberdeen
2016–17 season
- Chairman: Stewart Milne
- Manager: Derek McInnes
- Ground: Pittodrie Stadium
- Scottish Premiership: Runner-up
- Scottish League Cup: Runner-up
- Scottish Cup: Runner-up
- Europa League: Third qualifying round
- Top goalscorer: League: Adam Rooney (12); All: Adam Rooney (20)
- Highest home attendance: 19,332 vs Rangers, Premiership, 9 April 2017
- Lowest home attendance: 8,195 vs Kilmarnock, Premiership, 6 December 2016
- Average home league attendance: 12,640
Home colours	Away colours

The 2016–17 season was Aberdeen's 104th season in the top flight of Scottish football and the fourth in the Scottish Premiership. Aberdeen also competed in the League Cup and the Scottish Cup.

Aberdeen also competed in qualifying for the 2016–17 UEFA Europa League.

== Summary ==
=== August ===
Aberdeen were knocked out of the Europa League by Maribor in the Third qualifying round.

They were then boosted when top-scorer from last season Adam Rooney signed a new contract, keeping him at the club until 2020.

=== November ===
Aberdeen reached the League Cup Final but lost 3–0 to Celtic.

=== December ===
After the Cup final loss, McInnes became under pressure after a poor run of results in December which included an abandoned match at home against Motherwell.

However, the Dons ended 2016 with 3 wins out of their last 3 matches in the year, keeping the same starting line-up in all 3 matches, easing pressure on McInnes.

=== January ===
Graeme Shinnie boosted the Dons signing on an extra year to his contract.

=== February ===
On 6 February, Niall McGinn was awarded SPFL January Goal of the Month for his goal against Dundee.

After 3 bids were rejected in the January transfer window by Cardiff City, on 7 February Jonny Hayes signed a new contract extension to keep him at the club until 2019.

On 14 February, Andrew Considine signed a new contract to also keep him at the club until 2019.

=== March ===
On 9 March, English League One side Milton Keynes Dons announced that Peter Pawlett had signed a pre-contract deal to join the club at the end of the 2016–17 season.

On 29 March, Jonny Hayes earned his first start for Ireland in a 1-0 friendly defeat to Iceland.

On 30 March, Greg Tansey signed a pre-contract 3-year deal to join the club from Inverness Caledonian Thistle at the end of the 2016–17 season.

=== April ===
On 7 April, manager Derek McInnes won SPFL March Manager of the Month after reaching the Scottish Cup Semi-final and beating Dundee 7-0.

On 15 April, Aberdeen secured Europa League football for next season with a hard-fought win over St Johnstone in Perth.

On 22 April, Aberdeen reached the Scottish Cup final for the first time in 17 years with victory over holders Hibernian.

=== May ===
On 2 May, Jonny Hayes was shortlisted for player of the year in the PFA Scotland awards.

On 4 May, Derek McInnes was shortlisted for manager of the year in the PFA Scotland awards.

On 5 May, Joe Lewis, Shay Logan, Kenny McLean and Jonny Hayes all made the PFA Scotland's Premiership team of the year.

On 7 May, Aberdeen all but secured the Runners-up spot in the Premiership with a 2-1 win against Heart of Midlothian at Tynecastle Stadium.

On 12 May, Dean Campbell was introduced as a substitute against Celtic, becoming the club's youngest-ever player (a record previously held by Jack Grimmer).

On 17 May, Aberdeen defeated Rangers 2-1 at Ibrox Stadium, their first victory at that stadium since 1991. The result also mathematically confirmed Aberdeen's second place in the final league table.

On 21 May, teenager Scott Wright scored his first senior hat-trick to end the league season with a 6-0 win against Partick Thistle at Firhill.

On 24 May, Derek McInnes announced that Graeme Shinnie would captain the Dons in the Scottish Cup Final, after it was announced that Ryan Jack was leaving the club.

On 27 May, the Dons lost the Scottish Cup Final to Celtic, their sixth, in total, defeat to them this season against what was "The Invincibles".

== Results and fixtures ==
Win Draw Loss Postponed

=== Pre-season and friendlies ===
26 June 2016 Friendly	Brechin City	0–3	Aberdeen	Brechin
14:00 BST		AFC Twitter	Stockley 20'; Shankland 30'; Jack 89'	Stadium: Glebe Park; Attendance: 1,283 (AFC Twitter)

11 July 2016 Friendly	East Fife	2–4	Aberdeen	Methil
15:00 BST	Jack 53' (o.g.); McManus 55' (pen.)	AFC	Rooney 3'; O'Connor 39'; Stockley 65', 84'	Stadium: Bayview Stadium; Attendance: 574 (East Fife FC); Referee: Bobby Madden

15 January 2017 Friendly	Bunyodkor	1–2	Aberdeen	Dubai, United Arab Emirates
12:00	Javokhir 33'		Hayes 1'; Shinnie 75'	Stadium: Jebal Ali Resort; Attendance: 200

=== Scottish Premiership ===
7 August 2016 1	St Johnstone	0–0	Aberdeen	McDiarmid Park
12:15	Craig (yellow card) 34'; Cummins (yellow card) 37'	BBC Report; SPFL Report		Attendance: 5,728; Referee: Collum

13 August 2016 2	Aberdeen	0–0	Heart of Midlothian	Pittodrie Stadium
15:00	Shinnie (yellow card) 44'; Pawlett (yellow card) 50'	BBC Report; SPFL Report	Watt (yellow card) 31'; Rherras (yellow card) 37'; Bauben (yellow card) 43'; Djoum (yellow card) 53'; Rossi (yellow card) 78'	Attendance: 13,559; Referee: Clancy

20 August 2016 3	Aberdeen	2–1	Partick Thistle	Pittodrie Stadium
15:00	McGinn 28' (yellow card) 66'; Storey 58'	BBC Report; SPFL Report	Osman (yellow card) 27'; Devine (yellow card) 83'; Welsh (yellow card) 52' (yellow-red card) 87'; Erskine 90+3'	Attendance: 11,049; Referee: Beaton

27 August 2016 4	Celtic	4–1	Aberdeen	Celtic Park
15:00	Griffiths 13'; Forrest 42'; Sinclair 87' (pen.); Rogic 90'	BBC Report; SPFL Report	Rooney 32'; Reynolds (yellow card) 83' (yellow-red card) 87'; Shinnie (yellow card) 90+3'	Attendance: 57,758; Referee: Madden

10 September 2016 5	Aberdeen	1–1	Inverness Caledonian Thistle	Pittodrie Stadium
15:00	McGinn 51'	BBC Report; SPFL Report	Tansey (yellow card) 31'; Tremarco (yellow card) 45'; King (yellow card) 45+1'; Vigurs 68'	Attendance: 11,356; Referee: Allan

18 September 2016 6	Dundee	1–3	Aberdeen	Dens Park
12:00	Holt 13'; Kerr (yellow card) 22'; O'Dea (yellow card) 53'; O'Hara (yellow card) 64' (yellow-red card) 90+2'; Etxabeguren (yellow card) 87'	BBC Report; SPFL Report	Maddison 19'; O'Connor (yellow card) 44'; Shinnie (yellow card) 54'; Hayes (yellow card) 62'; Stockley 77'; McLean 88' (pen.)	Attendance: 6,321; Referee: McLean

25 September 2016 7	Aberdeen	2–1	Rangers	Pittodrie Stadium
13:00	Shinnie (yellow card) 14'; Hayes 46' (yellow card) 79'; Reynolds (yellow card) 53'; O'Connor (yellow card) 64'; McLean (yellow card) 83'; Maddison 90'	BBC Report; SPFL Report	Garner (yellow card) 22'; Wilson (yellow card) 48'; Halliday 79' (pen.); Kranjcar (yellow card) 81'; Tavernier (yellow card) 90'	Attendance: 19,263; Referee: Beaton

1 October 2016 8	Kilmarnock	0–4	Aberdeen	Rugby Park
15:00	MacDonald (yellow card) 24'; Burn (yellow card) 65'	BBC Report; SPFL Report	Rooney 25' (pen.), 72'; Considine 50'; Taylor 67'	Attendance: 4,592; Referee: Collum

15 October 2016 9	Aberdeen	4–0	Ross County	Pittodrie Stadium
15:00	Hayes 20'; Logan 32'; Reynolds (yellow card) 67'; McGinn 68'; Stockley 78'	BBC Report; SPFL Report	Fraser (yellow card) 12'; Chow (red card) 21'; Davies (yellow card) 73'	Attendance: 10,091; Referee: Thomson

25 October 2016 11	Hamilton Academical	1–0	Aberdeen	New Douglas Park
19:45	D'Acol 6' (pen.)	BBC Report; SPFL Report		Attendance: 2,315; Referee: Collum

29 October 2016 12	Aberdeen	0–1	Celtic	Pittodrie Stadium
12:00	Shinnie (yellow card) 47'; Hayes (yellow card) 79'	BBC Report; SPFL Report	Sviatchenko (yellow card) 2'; Rogic 23'; Brown (yellow card) 79'; Lustig (yellow card) 79'	Attendance: 17,105; Referee: McLean

4 November 2016 13	Partick Thistle	1–2	Aberdeen	Firhill Stadium
19:45	Barton 51'; Devine (yellow card) 56'; Welsh (yellow card) 81'	BBC Report; SPFL Report	O'Connor 39'; Stockley 53'	Attendance: 3,974; Referee: Madden

19 November 2016 14	Inverness Caledonian Thistle	1–3	Aberdeen	Caledonian Stadium
15:00	Doumbouya 15'; Vigurs (yellow card) 54'	BBC Report; SPFL Report	McLean 28', 89'; Rooney 33' (pen.); Maddison (yellow card) 68'	Attendance: 4,867; Referee: Clancy

3 December 2016 16	Rangers	2–1	Aberdeen	Ibrox Stadium
15:00	Kiernan (yellow card) 23'; Miller 52'; Halliday (yellow card) 53'; Hodson 70'; Hill (yellow card) 79' (yellow-red card) 90+1'; Wallace (yellow card) 90+2'; Waghorn (yellow card) 90+4'	BBC Report; SPFL Report	Considine (yellow card) 82' (goal) 90+4'; Pawlett (yellow card) 90+3'; Jack (yellow card) 60' (yellow-red card) 90+5'	Attendance: 50,003; Referee: McLean

6 December 2016 15 (Note: Rearranged game after postponement)	Aberdeen	5–1	Kilmarnock	Pittodrie Stadium
19:45	Pawlett 20'; Maddison (yellow card) 25'; O'Connor 30'; Hayes 37', 85'; Considine (yellow card) 43'; McGinn 69'	BBC Report; SPFL Report	Boyd (yellow card) 76'; McKenzie 77'	Attendance: 8,195; Referee: Finnie

10 December 2016 17	Aberdeen	0–0	St Johnstone	Pittodrie Stadium
15:00	McLean (yellow card) 87'	BBC Report; SPFL Report	Davidson (yellow card) 58'; Kane (yellow card) 67'; MacLean (yellow card) 68'	Attendance: 11,501; Referee: Clancy

13 December 2016 10 (Note: Rearranged game after postponement) (Note: Match abandoned due to floodlight failure)	Aberdeen	A–A	Motherwell	Pittodrie Stadium
19:45	Considine (yellow card) 5'	BBC Report; Evening Express	McManus (yellow card) 7'	Referee: Muir

17 December 2016 18	Ross County	2–1	Aberdeen	Victoria Park
15:00	Boyce 26'; Chow (yellow card) 39'; Routis (yellow card) 71' van der Weg (red card) 82'; Dow 88'	Report; SPFL Report	Considine (yellow card) 35'; McGinn 68'; Hayes (yellow card) 87'	Attendance: 4,467; Referee: Thomson

23 December 2016 19	Motherwell	1–3	Aberdeen	Fir Park
19:45	McDonald 16' (yellow card) 77'; Clay (yellow card) 63'	BBC Report; SPFL Report	Shinnie 6'; Rooney 25' (pen.); Reynolds (yellow card) 70'; Jack (yellow card) 73'; McGinn 90'	Attendance: 3,428; Referee: Madden

27 December 2016 20	Aberdeen	2–1	Hamilton Academical	Pittodrie Stadium
15:00	Taylor 34'; Lewis (yellow card) 37'; Rooney 68'; Maddison (yellow card) 90'	BBC Report; SPFL Report	Imrie 38' (pen.) (yellow card) 45+2'; Sarris (yellow card) 58'; Devlin (yellow card) 87'; McMann (red card) 90+2'	Attendance: 13,131; Referee: Dallas

30 December 2016 21	Heart of Midlothian	0–1	Aberdeen	Tynecastle Stadium
19:45	Johnsen (yellow card) 67'; Smith (yellow card) 89'	BBC Report; SPFL Report	Logan (yellow card) 8'; Taylor (yellow card) 18'; Hayes 66'	Attendance: 16,630; Referee: Collum

27 January 2017 22	Aberdeen	3–0	Dundee	Pittodrie Stadium
19:45	Jack 29'; McGinn 45', 80'; Shinnie (yellow card) 73'	BBC Report; SPFL Report	Etxabeguren (yellow card) 65'	Attendance: 10,512; Referee: Clancy

1 February 2017 23	Celtic	1–0	Aberdeen	Celtic Park
19:45	Boyata 57'; Brown (yellow card) 86'	BBC Report; SPFL Report	Logan (yellow card) 35'; Taylor (yellow card) 59'; Shinnie (yellow card) 71'	Attendance: 53,958; Referee: Beaton

4 February 2017 24	Aberdeen	2–0	Partick Thistle	Pittodrie Stadium
15:00	Jack (yellow card) 40'; Considine (yellow card) 54'; Stockley 72'; Christie 90+2'	BBC Report; SPFL Report		Attendance: 10,094; Referee: Greg Aitken

15 February 2017 10	Aberdeen	7–2	Motherwell	Pittodrie Stadium
19:45	Hayes 2'; Considine 32' (yellow card) 50'; Rooney 34', 64' (pen.), 69'; Christie 40'; Taylor (yellow card) 59'; Pawlett 83'	BBC Report; SPFL Report	Lucas (yellow card) 30'; Bowman 73'; Pearson 82'	Attendance: 10,384; Referee: Muir

19 February 2017 25	Kilmarnock	1–2	Aberdeen	Rugby Park
13:00	McKenzie 41' (yellow card) 67'; Dicker (yellow card) 79'	BBC Report; SPFL Report	Hayes (yellow card) 59'; Stockley 83'; Pawlett 85'; McLean (yellow card) 87'	Attendance: 3,972; Referee: Dallas

25 February 2017 26	Aberdeen	1–0	Ross County	Pittodrie Stadium
15:00	Reynolds (yellow card) 27'; Rooney 69'	BBC Report; SPFL Report	Gardyne (yellow card) 23'	Attendance: 11,774; Referee: Collum

28 February 2017 27	Hamilton Academical	1–0	Aberdeen	New Douglas Park
19:45	Devlin 9'; Skondras (yellow card) 52'; MacKinnon (yellow card) 83' (yellow-red card) 83'	BBC Report; SPFL Report	Shinnie (yellow card) 72'	Attendance: 2,006; Referee: McLean

11 March 2017 28	Aberdeen	1–0	Motherwell	Pittodrie Stadium
15:00	Stockley (yellow card) 82'; McGinn 90+2'	BBC Report; SPFL Report	Heneghan (yellow card) 13'; Bowman (yellow card) 32'; Pearson (yellow card) 69'; Hammell (yellow card) 72'; Ferguson (yellow card) 75'; Cadden (yellow card) 90'	Attendance: 12,524; Referee: Euan Anderson

18 March 2017 29	Aberdeen	2–0	Heart of Midlothian	Pittodrie Stadium
12:15	Logan 21'; Hayes 60'; Stockley (red card) 89'; Shinnie (yellow card) 90'	BBC Report	Tziolis (yellow card) 13'; Walker (yellow card) 78'; Martin (yellow card) 90+1'	Attendance: 12,178; Referee: McLean

31 March 2017 30	Dundee	0–7	Aberdeen	Dens Park
19:45	Kerr (yellow card) 81'	BBC Sport; SPFL Report	Considine 17', 39', 83'; Rooney 25'; McLean 34'; Jack 51'; McGinn 73'	Attendance: 7,314; Referee: Muir

4 April 2017 31	Aberdeen	1–0	Inverness Caledonian Thistle	Pittodrie Stadium
19:45	Taylor 22'	BBC Sport; SPFL Report	W McKay (yellow card) 40'; Tremarco (yellow card) 66'	Attendance: 11,507; Referee: Dallas

9 April 2017 32	Aberdeen	0–3	Rangers	Pittodrie Stadium
12:30	Jack (yellow card) 4'; Taylor (yellow card) 24'; Shinnie (yellow card) 33'	BBC Report; SPFL Report	Garner (yellow card) 4'; Holt (yellow card) 53'; Miller 79', 81'; Dodoo 83'	Attendance: 19,332; Referee: Clancy

15 April 2017 33	St Johnstone	1–2	Aberdeen	McDiarmid Park
15:00	Craig (yellow card) 22'; Swanson 48' (pen.); Wotherspoon (yellow card) 67'; MacLean (yellow card) 84'	BBC Report; SPFL Report	Christie 19'; Scobbie 32' (o.g.); Lewis (yellow card) 57'	Attendance: 5,132; Referee: Madden

29 April 2017 34	Aberdeen	0–2	St Johnstone	Pittodrie Stadium
15:00	Logan (yellow card) 18'; Hayes (yellow card) 19'; Stockley (yellow card) 90+3'	BBC Report; SPFL Report	Anderson (yellow card) 28'; Shaughnessy (yellow card) 33'; Swanson 80'; Thomson 80'; Craig (yellow card) 90+3'	Attendance: 10,606; Referee: Muir

7 May 2017 35	Heart of Midlothian	1–2	Aberdeen	Tynecastle Stadium
15:00	Buaben (yellow card) 27'; Gonçalves 61'; Walker (yellow card) 44' (yellow-red card) 90'	BBC Report; SPFL Report	Rooney 21'; Lewis (yellow card) 23'; O'Connor 64'; Reynolds (yellow card) 88'	Attendance: 16,522; Referee: Collum

12 May 2017 36	Aberdeen	1–3	Celtic	Pittodrie Stadium
19:45	Hayes 12'; Shinnie (yellow card) 85'; Logan (yellow card) 89'	BBC Sport	Boyata 3'; Armstrong 8'; Griffiths 11' (yellow card) 72'; Tierney (yellow card) 54'	Attendance: 16,015; Referee: McLean

17 May 2017 37	Rangers	1–2	Aberdeen	Ibrox Stadium
19:45	Miller (yellow card) 50'; Waghorn 61'; Bates (yellow card) 90'	BBC Sport	Shinnie 9'; Christie 53'; Considine (yellow card) 87'; Stockley (yellow card) 85' (yellow-red card) 89'	Attendance: 48,289; Referee: Beaton

21 May 2017 38	Partick Thistle	0–6	Aberdeen	Firhill Stadium
12:30	Edwards (yellow card) 34'; Lamont (yellow card) 70'	BBC Sport	Christie 7', 45'; Wright 11', 17', 51'; Hayes 26'; Considine (yellow card) 44'; Pawlett (yellow card) 56'	Attendance: 3,924; Referee: Euan Anderson

=== UEFA Europa League ===
Aberdeen qualified for the first preliminary round of the UEFA Europa League by finishing second in the 2015–16 Scottish Premiership.

==== Qualifying phase ====
30 June 2016 First qualifying round 1st leg	Aberdeen	3–1	Fola Esch (Luxembourg)	Aberdeen, Scotland
19:45	Logan 68'; McGinn 90+3'; Rooney 90+7' (pen.)	BBC; UEFA	Klein 70'	Stadium: Pittodrie Stadium; Attendance: 12,570; Referee: Kristoffersen (Denmark)

7 July 2016 First qualifying round 2nd leg	(Luxembourg) Fola Esch	1–0 (2–3 agg.)	Aberdeen	Luxembourg City, Luxembourg
17:30	Hadji 45'	BBC; UEFA		Stadium: Stade Josy Barthel; Attendance: 1,789; Referee: Nilsen (Norway)

14 July 2016 Second qualifying round 1st leg	Aberdeen	3–0	Ventspils (Latvia)	Aberdeen, Scotland
19:45	Stockley 71'; Rooney 75'; Burns 90+1'	BBC; UEFA		Stadium: Pittodrie Stadium; Attendance: 10,672; Referee: Pinheiro (Portugal)

21 July 2016 Second qualifying round 2nd leg	(Latvia) Ventspils	0–1 (0–4 agg.)	Aberdeen	Ventspils, Latvia
16:00		BBC; UEFA	Rooney 79'	Stadium: Olimpiskais Stadions; Attendance: 2,100; Referee: Grujić (Serbia)

28 July 2016 Third qualifying round 1st leg	Aberdeen	1–1	Maribor (Slovenia)	Aberdeen, Scotland
19:45	Hayes 88'	BBC; UEFA	Novaković 83'	Stadium: Pittodrie Stadium; Attendance: 17,105; Referee: Hansen (Norway)

4 August 2016 Third qualifying round 2nd leg	(Slovenia) Maribor	1–0 (2–1 agg.)	Aberdeen	Maribor, Slovenia
19:15	Shinnie 90+3' (o.g.)	BBC; UEFA		Stadium: Ljudski vrt Attendance: 9,796; Referee: Popov (Bulgaria)

=== Scottish League Cup ===
10 August 2016 Second Round	Ayr United	1–2	Aberdeen	Ayr
19:45	Forrest 41'; Adams (yellow card) 29'; Devlin (yellow card) 68'	BBC Report; SPFL Report	Meggatt 3' (o.g.); McGinn 30'; Jack (yellow card) 37'	Stadium: Somerset Park; Attendance: 2,653; Referee: Muir

22 September 2016 Quarter Final	Aberdeen	1–0	St Johnstone	Aberdeen
19:45	Maddison (yellow card) 7'; Shinnie (yellow card) 34'; Rooney 90'	BBC Report; SPFL Report	Shaughnessy (yellow card) 11'; Wotherspoon (yellow card) 45'; Paton (yellow card) 51'; Swanson (yellow card) 67'; Davidson (yellow card) 80'	Stadium: Pittodrie Stadium; Attendance: 8,829; Referee: Thomson

22 October 2016 Semi Final	Greenock Morton	0–2	Aberdeen	Glasgow
12:15	Lindsay (yellow card) 57'	BBC Report; SPFL Report	McGinn (yellow card) 47'; Rooney 69'; Considine (yellow card) 84'; McLean 88'	Stadium: Hampden Park; Attendance: 16,183; Referee: Clancy

27 November 2016 Final	Aberdeen	0–3	Celtic	Glasgow
15:00		BBC Report; SPFL Report	Rogic 16'; Forrest 37'; Brown (yellow card) 48'; Dembélé 64' (pen.); Bitton (yellow card) 73'	Stadium: Hampden Park; Attendance: 49,629; Referee: Beaton

=== Scottish Cup ===
21 January 2017 Fourth Round	Aberdeen	4–0	Stranraer	Pittodrie Stadium
15:00	Rooney 30', 50' (pen.); McGinn 35', 54'	BBC Report		Attendance: 8,960; Referee: Don Robertson

11 February 2017 Fifth Round	Ross County	0–1	Aberdeen	Victoria Park
15:00		BBC Report	Logan 87'	Attendance: 4,671; Referee: Madden

5 March 2017 Quarter-final	Aberdeen	1–0	Partick Thistle	Pittodrie Stadium
15:00	Shinnie 43'	BBC Report	Erskine (yellow card) 37'; Edwards (yellow card) 45+1'; Devine (yellow card) 70' (yellow-red card) 90+3'; Osman (yellow card) 82'	Attendance: 11,333; Referee: Thomson

22 April 2017 Semi-final	Hibernian	2–3	Aberdeen	Hampden Park
12:15	Fyvie (yellow card) 24'; Holt 36' (yellow card) 78'; McGeouch 60'	BBC Report	Rooney 1'; Christie 25'; Shinnie (yellow card) 82'; McGregor 86' (o.g.)	Attendance: 31,969; Referee: Beaton

27 May 2017 Final	Celtic	2–1	Aberdeen	Hampden Park
15:00	Armstrong 11'; Rogic 90+2'	BBC Report	Hayes 9'; Taylor (yellow card) 61'	Attendance: 48,713; Referee: Madden

== Squad statistics ==
Joe Lewis was the only player to have played every minute of this season.

=== Appearances ===
No.	Pos	Nat	Player	Total		Premiership		Europa League		League Cup		Scottish Cup	
No.	Pos	Nat	Player	Apps	Goals	Apps	Goals	Apps	Goals	Apps	Goals	Apps	Goals
1	GK	(England) ENG	Joe Lewis	53	0	38	0	6	0	4	0	5	0
2	DF	(England) ENG	Shay Logan	53	4	37+1	2	6	1	4	0	5	1
3	DF	(Scotland) SCO	Graeme Shinnie	52	3	36+1	2	6	0	4	0	5	1
4	DF	(Scotland) SCO	Andrew Considine	51	6	36	6	6	0	4	0	5	0
5	DF	(Wales) WAL	Ash Taylor	44	3	28+3	3	6	0	2	0	5	0
6	DF	(Scotland) SCO	Mark Reynolds	38	0	22+4	0	4+1	0	2+1	0	4	0
7	MF	(Scotland) SCO	Kenny McLean	53	5	37+1	4	5+1	0	4	1	5	0
8	MF	(Scotland) SCO	Ryan Christie	15	7	7+6	6	0	0	0	0	1+1	1
9	FW	(Republic of Ireland) IRL	Adam Rooney	53	20	32+6	12	4+2	3	3+1	2	4+1	3
10	MF	(Northern Ireland) NIR	Niall McGinn	50	14	30+6	10	5	1	3+1	1	4+1	2
11	MF	(Republic of Ireland) IRL	Jonny Hayes	44	11	32	9	5	1	2	0	5	1
15	DF	(Republic of Ireland) IRL	Anthony O'Connor	41	3	25+7	3	1	0	4	0	0+4	0
16	MF	(Scotland) SCO	Peter Pawlett	21	3	6+11	3	1	0	0+1	0	1+1	0
17	FW	(England) ENG	Jayden Stockley	39	6	8+19	5	4+2	1	1+2	0	2+1	0
22	MF	(Scotland) SCO	Ryan Jack (c)	37	2	23+1	2	6	0	2+1	0	4	0
25	GK	(Scotland) SCO	Neil Alexander	0	0	0	0	0	0	0	0	0	0
26	FW	(Scotland) SCO	Scott Wright	8	3	1+4	3	0+1	0	0	0	0+2	0
27	MF	(Scotland) SCO	Frank Ross	4	0	0+3	0	0	0	0	0	0+1	0
29	FW	(Scotland) SCO	Connor McLennan	0	0	0	0	0	0	0	0	0	0
34	DF	(Scotland) SCO	Bruce Anderson	0	0	0	0	0	0	0	0	0	0
36	DF	(Scotland) SCO	Sebastian Ross	0	0	0	0	0	0	0	0	0	0
39	FW	(England) ENG	Miles Storey	18	1	2+12	1	0+2	0	0+1	0	0+1	0
47	MF	(Scotland) SCO	Dean Campbell	1	0	0+1	0	0	0	0	0	0	0
Players who left the club during the 2016–17 season
8	MF	(Republic of Ireland) IRL	Willo Flood (contract terminated - joined Dundee United)	2	0	0	0	1+1	0	0	0	0	0
8	FW	(Wales) WAL	Wes Burns (end of loan spell)	21	1	7+6	0	1+3	1	2+2	0	0	0
18	DF	(Republic of Ireland) IRL	Callum Morris (released - joined Dunfermline Athletic)	0	0	0	0	0	0	0	0	0	0
23	MF	(England) ENG	James Maddison (end of loan spell)	17	2	10+4	2	0	0	3	0	0	0
Players who left the club on loan during the 2016–17 season
14	FW	(Scotland) SCO	Cammy Smith (on loan to St Mirren)	0	0	0	0	0	0	0	0	0	0
19	MF	(Scotland) SCO	Craig Storie (on loan to St Mirren)	2	0	0+2	0	0	0	0	0	0	0
20	FW	(England) ENG	Joe Nuttall (on loan to Dumbarton)	0	0	0	0	0	0	0	0	0	0
21	FW	(Scotland) SCO	Lawrence Shankland (on loan to Greenock Morton)	0	0	0	0	0	0	0	0	0	0
24	DF	(Scotland) SCO	Scott McKenna (on loan to Ayr United)	1	0	0	0	0	0	0+1	0	0	0
28	DF	(Scotland) SCO	Daniel Harvie (on loan to Dumbarton)	0	0	0	0	0	0	0	0	0	0
30	GK	(Republic of Ireland) IRL	Danny Rogers (on loan to Falkirk)	0	0	0	0	0	0	0	0	0	0
40	GK	(Australia) AUS	Aaron Lennox (on loan to Raith Rovers)	0	0	0	0	0	0	0	0	0	0
50	GK	(Scotland) SCO	Robbie Mutch (on loan to Arbroath)	0	0	0	0	0	0	0	0	0	0

=== Goalscorers ===
Ranking	Nation	Number	Name	Scottish Premiership	Europa League	League Cup	Scottish Cup	Total
1	(Republic of Ireland)	9	Adam Rooney	12	3	2	3	20
2	(Northern Ireland)	10	Niall McGinn	10	1	1	2	14
3	(Republic of Ireland)	11	Jonny Hayes	9	1	0	1	11
4	(Scotland)	8	Ryan Christie	6	0	0	1	7
5	(Scotland)	4	Andrew Considine	6	0	0	0	6
5	(England)	17	Jayden Stockley	5	1	0	0	6
7	(Scotland)	7	Kenny McLean	4	0	1	0	5
8	(England)	2	Shay Logan	2	1	0	1	4
9	(Scotland)	3	Graeme Shinnie	2	0	0	1	3
9	(Wales)	5	Ash Taylor	3	0	0	0	3
9	(Republic of Ireland)	15	Anthony O'Connor	3	0	0	0	3
9	(Scotland)	16	Peter Pawlett	3	0	0	0	3
9	(Scotland)	26	Scott Wright	3	0	0	0	3
14	(Scotland)	22	Ryan Jack	2	0	0	0	2
14	(England)	23	James Maddison	2	0	0	0	2
16	(Wales)	8	Wes Burns	0	1	0	0	1
16	(England)	39	Miles Storey	1	0	0	0	1
16			Own goal	1	0	1	1	3
TOTALS				74	8	5	10	97

=== Disciplinary record ===
Number	Nation	Position	Name	Premiership		Europa League		League Cup		Scottish Cup		Total	
Number	Nation	Position	Name	Yellow card	Red card	Yellow card	Red card	Yellow card	Red card	Yellow card	Red card	Yellow card	Red card
1	(England)	GK	Joe Lewis	3	0	1	0	0	0	0	0	4	0
2	(England)	DF	Shay Logan	4	0	1	0	0	0	0	0	5	0
3	(Scotland)	DF	Graeme Shinnie	11	0	2	0	1	0	1	0	15	0
4	(Scotland)	DF	Andrew Considine	7	0	0	0	1	0	0	0	8	0
5	(Wales)	DF	Ash Taylor	4	0	1	0	0	0	1	0	6	0
6	(Scotland)	DF	Mark Reynolds	5	1	0	0	0	0	0	0	5	1
7	(Scotland)	MF	Kenny McLean	3	0	2	0	0	0	0	0	5	0
8	(Wales)	MF	Wes Burns	1	0	0	0	0	0	0	0	1	0
8	(Republic of Ireland)	MF	Willo Flood	0	0	1	0	0	0	0	0	1	0
9	(Republic of Ireland)	FW	Adam Rooney	0	0	2	0	0	0	0	0	2	0
10	(Northern Ireland)	MF	Niall McGinn	1	0	0	0	1	0	0	0	2	0
11	(Republic of Ireland)	MF	Jonny Hayes	6	0	1	0	0	0	0	0	7	0
15	(Republic of Ireland)	DF	Anthony O'Connor	2	0	0	0	0	0	0	0	2	0
16	(Scotland)	MF	Peter Pawlett	3	0	0	0	0	0	0	0	3	0
17	(England)	FW	Jayden Stockley	3	2	0	1	0	0	0	0	3	3
22	(Scotland)	MF	Ryan Jack	3	1	1	0	1	0	1	0	6	1
23	(England)	MF	James Maddison	3	0	0	0	1	0	0	0	4	0
26	(Scotland)	FW	Scott Wright	0	0	1	0	0	0	0	0	1	0
			TOTALS	58	4	13	1	5	0	3	0	79	5

== Team statistics ==
=== League table ===
Pos	Team	Pld	W	D	L	GF	GA	GD	Pts	Qualification or relegation (Note: Teams played each other three times (33 matches), before the league split into two groups (the top six and the bottom six) for the last five matches.)
1	Celtic (C)	38	34	4	0	106	25	+81	106	Qualification for the Champions League second qualifying round (Note: Since the winners of the 2016–17 Scottish Cup, Celtic, qualified for European competition based on league position, the spot awarded to the Scottish cup winners (Europa League second qualifying round) was passed to the second-placed team and the spot awarded to the second-placed team (Europa League first qualifying round) was passed to the fourth-placed team.)
2	Aberdeen	38	24	4	10	74	35	+39	76	Qualification for the Europa League second qualifying round
3	Rangers	38	19	10	9	56	44	+12	67	Qualification for the Europa League first qualifying round
4	St Johnstone	38	17	7	14	50	46	+4	58	Qualification for the Europa League first qualifying round
5	Heart of Midlothian	38	12	10	16	55	52	+3	46	

Source: Scottish Premiership, Soccerway
Rules for classification: 1) Points; 2) Goal difference; 3) Goals scored; 4) Play-off (only if deciding champion, UEFA competitions qualification and second stage group allocation).
(C) Champions

== Transfers ==
=== Players in ===
Dates	Position	Nationality	Player	From	Fee
11 May 2016	FW	(England)	Jayden Stockley	(England) Bournemouth	Free
15 June 2016	GK	(England)	Joe Lewis	(England) Cardiff City	Free
15 June 2016	GK	(Scotland)	Neil Alexander	(Scotland) Heart of Midlothian	Free
15 June 2016	DF	(Republic of Ireland)	Callum Morris	(Scotland) Dundee United	Free
25 June 2016	DF	(Republic of Ireland)	Anthony O'Connor	(England) Burton Albion	Free
1 July 2016	FW	(England)	Miles Storey	(England) Swindon Town	Free

=== Players out ===
Dates	Position	Nationality	Player	To	Fee
16 May 2016	GK	(England)	Scott Brown	(England) Wycombe Wanderers	Free
16 May 2016	MF	(Scotland)	Barry Robson	Retired	N/A
18 June 2016	DF	(Scotland)	Michael Rose	(Scotland) Ayr United	Free
29 June 2016	FW	(Scotland)	David Goodwillie	(England) Plymouth Argyle	Free
14 July 2016	MF	(Republic of Ireland)	Willo Flood	(Scotland) Dundee United	Free
31 December 2016	DF	(Republic of Ireland)	Callum Morris	(Scotland) Dunfermline Athletic	Free

=== Loans in ===
Date	Position	Nationality	Name	From	Fee
14 July 2016	FW	(Wales)	Wes Burns	(England) Bristol City	Loan
31 August 2016	MF	(England)	James Maddison	(England) Norwich City	Loan
24 January 2017	MF	(Scotland)	Ryan Christie	(Scotland) Celtic	Loan

=== Loans out ===
Date	Position	Nationality	Name	To	Fee
20 June 2016	GK	(Australia)	Aaron Lennox	(Scotland) Raith Rovers	Loan
8 July 2016	GK	(Republic of Ireland)	Danny Rogers	(Scotland) Falkirk	Loan
13 July 2016	MF	(Scotland)	Cammy Smith	(Scotland) Dundee United	Loan
19 July 2016	FW	(Scotland)	Lawrence Shankland	(Scotland) St Mirren	Loan
3 August 2016	DF	(Scotland)	Daniel Harvie	(Scotland) Dumbarton	Loan
10 November 2016	FW	(England)	Joe Nuttall	(Scotland) Stranraer	Loan
11 November 2016	DF	(Scotland)	Scott McKenna	(Scotland) Ayr United	Loan
16 December 2016	FW	(Scotland)	Connor McLennan	(Scotland) Brechin City	One-month Loan
3 January 2017	MF	(Scotland)	Craig Storie	(Scotland) St Mirren	Loan
11 January 2017	FW	(Scotland)	Lawrence Shankland (Note: Second loan spell)	(Scotland) Greenock Morton	Loan
26 January 2017	MF	(Scotland)	Cammy Smith	(Scotland) St Mirren	Loan
31 March 2017	FW	(England)	Joe Nuttall	(Scotland) Dumbarton	Loan

== See also ==
- List of Aberdeen F.C. seasons
