= Luka Belić =

Luka Belić may refer to:

- Luka Belić (tennis) (born 1988), former tennis player from Croatia
- Luka Belić (footballer) (born 1996), Serbian football midfielder
