= 2016–17 Motherwell F.C. season =

Motherwell
2016–17 season
- Chairman: Brian McCafferty
- Manager: Mark McGhee (until 28 February 2017); Steve Robinson (caretacker) (28 February-15 March 2017); Steve Robinson (from 15 March)
- Stadium: Fir Park
- Scottish Premiership: 9th
- Scottish Cup: Fourth round vs Rangers
- League Cup: Last 16 vs Celtic
- Top goalscorer: League: Louis Moult (15); All: Louis Moult (18)
- Average home league attendance: 4,450
Home colours	Away colours	Third colours

The 2016–17 season is Motherwell's thirty-second consecutive season in the top flight of Scottish football and the fourth in the newly established Scottish Premiership, having been promoted from the Scottish First Division at the end of the 1984–85 season. Motherwell will also compete in the League Cup and the Scottish Cup.

== Season review ==
Following the conclusion of the 2015–16 season, Brett Long, Jack Leitch, David Clarkson and Wes Fletcher were released by the club following the end of their contracts, whilst loan players Connor Ripley and Morgaro Gomis returned to their parent clubs. Also at the end of the 2015–16 season, first team players Steven Hammell, Stephen McManus, Craig Samson, Keith Lasley, Craig Moore, James McFadden, David Ferguson, Ben Hall and Scott McDonald were all offered new contracts, as were Under 20 players Dylan Mackin, Robbie Leith, Jack McMillan, Ross MacLean and Ryan Watters. Lasley signed a new one-year contract on 22 June 2016.

On 2 June 2016, Motherwell were drawn into Group F of the 2016–17 Scottish League Cup, resulting in matches against Rangers, Annan Athletic, East Stirlingshire and Stranraer at the end of July. On 5 June 2016, Motherwell announced their first 4 pre-season friendlies, with another two to be confirmed at a later date. Steven Hammell signed a new two-year contract with Motherwell on 29 June, with Scott McDonald signing a new one-year on 1 July 2016.

On 9 July 2015, Motherwell announced that assistant manager Steve Robinson had left the club to take up the vacant Oldham Athletic managers job.

On 7 December 2016, Ross MacLean signed a new two-and-a-half-year deal with Motherwell, keeping him at the club until the summer of 2019.

=== Transfers ===
On 23 June 2016, Motherwell announced their first signings of the season, with Ben Heneghan, Richard Tait and Jacob Blyth all joining the club. Motherwell announced Dean Brill as their fourth summer signing on 27 June. Two days later, 29 June, Stephen Pearson left the club and returned to the Indian Super League with Atlético de Kolkata. On 5 July, Motherwell announced the signing of Carl McHugh on a free-transfer after his Plymouth Argyle contract had expired. Craig Clay became Motherwells sixth summer signing on 10 August, signing a two-year contract.

On 15 August 2016, Louis Laing joined Notts County on loan until 16 January 2017.

On 31 August, transfer deadline day, Motherwell saw the departure of Marvin Johnson to Oxford United for an undisclosed fee, and Luke Watt to Stranraer on loan until January 2017. Also on the 31st, Motherwell signed Ryan Bowman on a two-year contract from Gateshead for an undisclosed fee, and Luka Belić on a six-month loan deal from West Ham United.

On 14 September, Lee Lucas, who had been on trial early in the summer, signed a short-term deal with the club until January 2017.

=== January Transfers ===
On 1 January 2017, Motherwell announced that Dom Thomas had moved to Queen of the South on loan until the end of the season.

On 26 January, Motherwell signed midfielder Elliott Frear from Forest Green Rovers, with Russell Griffiths joining the club on loan for the remainder of the season from Everton the following day. Also on the 27th, Luka Belić loan came to an end, Dean Brill was released by the club, Dylan Mackin joined Alloa Athletic on loan for the remainder of the season, and Zak Jules joined until the end of the season from Reading.

On 31 January 2017, Motherwell signed Sunderland goalkeeper Oliver Pain on loan until the end of the season, whilst Luke Watt joined East Fife for the remainder of the season.

=== February ===
On 1 February, Motherwell announced that Shea Gordon had joined their U20's.

On 2 February, Stephen Pearson returned to the club, signing a contract until the end of the season.

On 28 February, manager Mark McGhee was sacked by the club, with Steve Robinson being put in temporary charge.

=== March ===
On 15 March, Robinson was given a permanent contract as the club's manager. On 23 March, Kieran Kennedy left the club by mutual consent.

== Squad ==
As of match played 20 May 2017

No.	Name	Nationality	Position	Date of birth (age)	Signed from	Signed in	Contract ends	Apps.	Goals
Goalkeepers
1	Craig Samson	(Scotland)	GK	1 April 1984 (aged 33)	Kilmarnock	2015	2017	42	0
13	Russell Griffiths	(England)	GK	13 April 1996 (aged 21)	on loan from Everton	2017	2017	4	0
31	Oliver Pain	(Australia)	GK	28 October 1997 (aged 19)	on loan from Sunderland	2017	2017	0	0
41	P. J. Morrison	(Scotland)	GK	1 January 1998 (aged 19)	Academy	2015		0	0
Defenders
2	Richard Tait	(Scotland)	DF	24 March 1996 (aged 21)	Grimsby Town	2016	2019	31	1
3	Steven Hammell	(Scotland)	DF	18 February 1982 (aged 35)	Southend United	2008	2018	574	5
4	Ben Heneghan	(England)	DF	19 September 1993 (aged 23)	Chester	2016	2018	43	0
6	Stephen McManus	(Scotland)	DF	10 September 1982 (aged 34)	Middlesbrough	2013	2018	155	6
15	Joe Chalmers	(Scotland)	DF	3 January 1994 (aged 23)	Celtic	2015	2017	32	0
21	Zak Jules	(Scotland)	DF	2 July 1997 (aged 19)	on loan from Reading	2017	2017	10	1
25	David Ferguson	(Scotland)	DF	24 March 1996 (aged 21)	Academy	2013	2017	16	0
30	Jack McMillan	(Scotland)	DF	18 December 1997 (aged 19)	Academy	2015		15	0
43	Adam Livingstone	(Scotland)	DF	22 February 1998 (aged 19)	Academy	2015		2	0
Midfielders
7	Lionel Ainsworth	(England)	MF	1 October 1987 (aged 29)	Rotherham United	2014	2017	127	23
8	Carl McHugh	(Republic of Ireland)	MF	5 February 1993 (aged 24)	Unattached	2018	2018	22	2
12	Chris Cadden	(Scotland)	MF	19 September 1996 (aged 20)	Academy	2013	2018	69	7
14	Keith Lasley	(Scotland)	MF	21 September 1979 (aged 37)	Plymouth Argyle	2006	2017	485	23
17	Elliott Frear	(England)	MF	11 September 1990 (aged 26)	Forest Green Rovers	2017	2019	15	1
18	Lee Lucas	(Wales)	MF	10 June 1992 (aged 24)	Unattached	2016	2017	11	0
20	Craig Clay	(England)	MF	5 May 1992 (aged 25)	Grimsby Town	2018	2018	39	1
26	Allan Campbell	(Scotland)	MF	4 July 1997 (aged 19)	Academy	2015		7	1
27	Ross MacLean	(Scotland)	MF	13 March 1997 (aged 20)	Academy	2014	2019	8	0
32	David Turnbull	(Scotland)	MF	10 July 1999 (aged 17)	Academy	2015		0	0
33	Barry Maguire	(Scotland)	MF	2 December 1985 (aged 31)	Academy	2015		0	0
34	Jake Hastie	(Scotland)	MF	18 March 1999 (aged 18)	Academy	2016		3	0
36	Shea Gordon	(Northern Ireland)	MF	16 May 1998 (aged 19)	Stalybridge Celtic	2017		4	0
88	Stephen Pearson	(Scotland)	MF	2 October 1982 (aged 34)	Unattached	2017	2017	142	24
Forwards
9	Louis Moult	(England)	FW	14 May 1992 (aged 25)	Wrexham	2015	2018	76	36
11	Ryan Bowman	(England)	FW	30 November 1991 (aged 25)	Gateshead	2018	2018	24	2
19	Jacob Blyth	(England)	FW	14 August 1992 (aged 24)	Leicester City	2016	2018	9	0
24	James McFadden	(Scotland)	FW	14 April 1983 (aged 34)	Unattached	2015	2017	123	44
35	Dylan Falconer	(Scotland)	FW	23 May 1999 (aged 17)	Academy	2015		0	0
77	Scott McDonald	(Australia)	FW	21 August 1983 (aged 33)	Millwall	2015	2017	215	74
Away on loan
22	Craig Moore	(Scotland)	FW	16 August 1994 (aged 22)	Academy	2011	2017	29	1
23	Dom Thomas	(Scotland)	MF	14 February 1996 (aged 21)	Academy	2013	2018	39	0
28	Luke Watt	(Scotland)	DF	20 June 1997 (aged 19)	Academy	2014		8	0
34	Dylan Mackin	(Scotland)	FW	15 January 1997 (aged 20)	Academy	2013		3	0
Left during the season
5	Louis Laing	(England)	DF	6 March 1993 (aged 24)	Nottingham Forest	2015	2017	29	2
11	Marvin Johnson	(England)	MF	1 December 1990 (aged 26)	Kidderminster Harriers	2015	2018	64	11
13	Dean Brill	(Northern Ireland)	GK	2 December 1985 (aged 31)	Inverness Caledonian Thistle	2016	2017	0	0
16	Kieran Kennedy	(England)	DF	23 September 1993 (aged 23)	Leicester City	2015	2017	25	0
21	Luka Belić	(Serbia)	FW	18 April 1996 (aged 21)	on loan from West Ham United	2016	2017	0	0
42	Josh Moore	(Scotland)	MF	26 March 1998 (aged 19)	Academy	2015		0	0

== Transfers ==
=== In ===
Date	Position	Nationality	Name	From	Fee	Ref.
23 June 2016	DF	(England)	Ben Heneghan	Chester	Undisclosed	
23 June 2016	DF	(Scotland)	Richard Tait	Grimsby Town	Undisclosed	
23 June 2016	FW	(England)	Jacob Blyth	Leicester City	Undisclosed	
27 June 2016	GK	(England)	Dean Brill	Inverness Caledonian Thistle	Undisclosed	
5 July 2016	MF	(Republic of Ireland)	Carl McHugh	Unattached	Free	
10 August 2016	MF	(England)	Craig Clay	Grimsby Town	Undisclosed	
31 August 2016	FW	(England)	Ryan Bowman	Gateshead	Undisclosed	
14 September 2016	MF	(Wales)	Lee Lucas	Unattached	Free	
26 January 2017	MF	(England)	Elliott Frear	Forest Green Rovers	Undisclosed	
31 January 2017	MF	(Northern Ireland)	Shea Gordon	Stalybridge Celtic	Undisclosed	
2 February 2017	MF	(Scotland)	Stephen Pearson	Unattached	Free	

=== Loans in ===
Date from	Position	Nationality	Name	From	Date to	Ref.
31 August 2016	FW	(Serbia)	Luka Belić	West Ham United	Six-month	
27 January 2017	GK	(England)	Russell Griffiths	Everton	31 May 2017	
27 January 2017	DF	(Scotland)	Zak Jules	Reading	31 May 2017	
31 January 2017	GK	(Australia)	Oliver Pain	Sunderland	31 May 2017	

=== Out ===
Date	Position	Nationality	Name	To	Fee	Ref.
29 June 2016	MF	(Scotland)	Stephen Pearson	Atlético de Kolkata	Undisclosed	
9 July 2016	MF	(England)	Josh Law	Oldham Athletic	Free	
31 August 2016	MF	(England)	Marvin Johnson	Oxford United	Undisclosed	

=== Loans out ===
Date from	Position	Nationality	Name	To	Date to	Ref.
19 July 2016	FW	(Scotland)	Craig Moore	Ayr United	31 May 2017	
15 August 2016	DF	(England)	Louis Laing	Notts County	16 January 2017	
31 August 2016	DF	(Scotland)	Luke Watt	Stranraer	January 2017	
1 January 2017	MF	(Scotland)	Dom Thomas	Queen of the South	31 May 2017	
27 January 2017	FW	(Scotland)	Dylan Mackin	Alloa Athletic	31 May 2017	
31 January 2017	DF	(Scotland)	Luke Watt	East Fife	31 May 2017	

=== Released ===
Date	Position	Nationality	Name	Joined	Date	Ref.
8 September 2016	MF	(Scotland)	Josh Moore			
27 January 2017	GK	(Northern Ireland)	Dean Brill	Colchester United	31 January 2017	
31 January 2017	DF	(England)	Louis Laing	Inverness Caledonian Thistle	16 February 2017	
23 March 2017	DF	(England)	Kieran Kennedy	AFC Fylde	23 March 2017	
31 May 2017	GK	(Scotland)	Jordan Pettigrew			
31 May 2017	GK	(Scotland)	Craig Samson	St Mirren	7 June 2017	
31 May 2017	DF	(Scotland)	Joe Chalmers	Inverness Caledonian Thistle	14 July 2017	
31 May 2017	DF	(Scotland)	David Ferguson	Ayr United	13 July 2017	
31 May 2017	MF	(Scotland)	Stephen Pearson			
31 May 2017	MF	(Wales)	Tom Fry			
31 May 2017	MF	(Wales)	Lee Lucas	Merthyr Town	August 2018	
31 May 2017	FW	(Australia)	Scott McDonald	Dundee United	24 July 2017	
31 May 2017	FW	(Scotland)	Craig Moore	Ayr United	1 June 2017	
31 May 2017	FW	(Scotland)	Dylan Mackin	Livingston	20 June 2017	
31 May 2017	MF	(England)	Lionel Ainsworth	Plymouth Argyle	1 June 2017	

=== Trial ===
Date From	Position	Nationality	Name	Last club	Date To	Ref.
23 July 2016	MF	(Wales)	Lee Lucas	Swansea City	31 August 2016	
26 July 2016	MF	(England)	Craig Clay	Grimsby Town	10 August 2016	

== Friendlies ==
2 July 2016 Friendly	Albion Rovers	1–3	Motherwell	Coatbridge
15:00 BST	Willis 25'	Report	Moult 40'; Johnson 44'; Lasley 71'	Stadium: Cliftonhill; Attendance: 445

3 July 2016 Friendly	Arbroath	1–0	Motherwell	Coatbridge
15:00 BST	Doris 88'	Report		Stadium: Cliftonhill

5 July 2016 Friendly	Cowdenbeath	3–1	Motherwell	Cowdenbeath
19:30 BST	Brett 54' (pen.); Kennedy 66' (o.g.); Trialist 71'	Report	Johnson 44'	Stadium: Central Park

9 July 2016 Friendly	Dumbarton	1–2	Motherwell	Dumbarton
15:00 BST	Thomson	Report	MacLean 63'; Moore 76'	Stadium: The Cheaper Insurance Direct Stadium

10 July 2016 Friendly	Hibernian	4–1	Motherwell	Edinburgh
15:00 BST	Boyle 4'; Holt 17'; McGinn 23'; Keatings 66'	Report	Johnson 2'	Stadium: Easter Road

== Competitions ==
=== Premiership ===
==== League table ====
Pos	Team	Pld	W	D	L	GF	GA	GD	Pts	Qualification or relegation (Note: Teams played each other three times (33 matches), before the league split into two groups (the top six and the bottom six) for the last five matches.)
7	Ross County	38	11	13	14	48	58	−10	46	
8	Kilmarnock	38	9	14	15	36	56	−20	41	
9	Motherwell	38	10	8	20	46	69	−23	38	
10	Dundee	38	10	7	21	38	62	−24	37	
11	Hamilton Academical (O)	38	7	14	17	37	56	−19	35	Qualification for the Premiership play-off final

Source: Scottish Premiership, Soccerway
Rules for classification: 1) Points; 2) Goal difference; 3) Goals scored; 4) Play-off (only if deciding champion, UEFA competitions qualification and second stage group allocation).
(O) Play-off winners

==== Results by round ====
Round	1	2	3	4	5	6	7	8	9	10	11	12	13	14	15	16	17	18	19	20	21	22	23	24	25	26	27	28	29	30	31	32	33	34	35	36	37	38
Ground	A	H	A	H	A	H	A	H	A	H	H	A	H	A	H	H	A	H	A	A	H	A	H	A	A	H	A	A	H	A	H	A	H	H	H	A	H	A
Result	W	L	L	D	D	W	D	L	L	L	W	L	W	L	L	D	D	L	W	D	L	W	L	L	L	L	W	L	L	D	D	L	W	L	L	W	W	L
Position	4	7	9	8	8	5	5	6	6	11	9	10	6	6	9	9	8	10	7	9	10	6	6	6	10	10	10	10	10	10	10	11	10	11	11	10	9	9

Source: See results
A = Away; H = Home; W = Win; D = Draw; L = Loss

==== Results summary ====
Overall								Home						Away					
Pld	W	D	L	GF	GA	GD	Pts	W	D	L	GF	GA	GD	W	D	L	GF	GA	GD
38	10	8	20	46	69	−23	38	5	3	11	27	37	−10	5	5	9	19	32	−13

Source: See Results

==== Results ====
6 August 2016 1	Kilmarnock	1–2	Motherwell	Kilmarnock
15:00 BST (UTC+1)	M Smith 81'	BBC Report	Ainsworth 41'; Johnson (yellow card) 45' (goal) 46'; McHugh (yellow card) 54'; Heneghan (yellow card) 90+4'	Stadium: Rugby Park; Attendance: 4.308; Referee: Craig Thomson

13 August 2016 2	Motherwell	1–2	St Johnstone	Motherwell
15:00 BST (UTC+1)	Tait (yellow card) 39'; Cadden 47'; Clay (yellow card) 74'; McDonald (yellow card) 82'	BBC Report	Kane (yellow card) 42'; Swanson (yellow card) 50' (goal) 56'; MacLean 75'; Davidson (yellow card) 90+2'	Stadium: Fir Park; Attendance: 3,739; Referee: Euan Anderson

20 August 2016 3	Rangers	2–1	Motherwell	Glasgow
15:00 BST (UTC+1)	Forrester 64'; Miller 90+1'	BBC Report	McDonald 19'	Stadium: Ibrox Stadium; Attendance: 48,716; Referee: Bobby Madden

27 August 2016 4	Motherwell	0–0	Dundee	Motherwell
15:00 BST (UTC+1)	Heneghan (yellow card) 84'	BBC Report	O'Hara (yellow card) 27'; McGowan (yellow card) 31'	Stadium: Fir Park; Attendance: 4,078; Referee: Andrew Dallas

10 September 2016 5	Ross County	1–1	Motherwell	Dingwall
15:00 BST (UTC+1)	McEveley (yellow card) 24' (yellow-red card) 70'; Boyce 61'; Fox (yellow card) 66'	BBC Report	Lasley 22'; Tait (yellow card) 31'; Moult 67' (pen.)	Stadium: Global Energy Stadium; Attendance: 3,019; Referee: Alan Muir

17 September 2016 6	Motherwell	4–2	Hamilton Academical	Motherwell
15:00 BST (UTC+1)	Moult 8', 13', 21', 50' (pen.); McManus (yellow card) 79'; Lasley (yellow card) 88'; Clay (yellow card) 90'	BBC Report	Donati (yellow card) 23'; Crawford 36', 64'; Gillespie (yellow card) 54'; Imrie (yellow card) 75'; Devlin (yellow card) 80'	Stadium: Fir Park; Attendance: 4,514; Referee: William Collum

24 September 2016 7	Partick Thistle	1–1	Motherwell	Glasgow
15:00 BST (UTC+1)	Erskine 31'; Lindsay (yellow card) 63'	BBC Report	McDonald 83'; Cadden (yellow card) 86'	Stadium: Firhill Stadium; Attendance: 3,227; Referee: Craig Thomson

30 September 2016 8	Motherwell	1–3	Heart of Midlothian	Motherwell
19:45 BST (UTC+1)	McFadden 90+2'	BBC Report	Nicholson 45'; Rossi (yellow card) 63'; Paterson 67'; Djoum 84'	Stadium: Fir Park; Attendance: 4,666; Referee: Steven McLean

15 October 2016 9	Celtic	2–0	Motherwell	Glasgow
15:00 BST (UTC+1)	Sinclair 18'; Henderson (yellow card) 23'; Brown (yellow card) 70'; Dembélé 87' (pen.)	BBC Report	Tait (yellow card) 46'; Moult (yellow card) 79'	Stadium: Celtic Park; Attendance: 54,159; Referee: John Beaton

26 October 2016 11	Motherwell	0–3	Inverness Caledonian Thistle	Motherwell
19:45 BST (UTC+1)		BBC Report	Tremarco 57' (yellow card) 86'; Doumbouya 71'; Polworth 83'	Stadium: Fir Park; Attendance: 3,131; Referee: Don Robertson

29 October 2016 12	Motherwell	4–1	Ross County	Motherwell
15:00 BST (UTC+1)	McDonald 8' van der Weg 32' (o.g.); Heneghan (yellow card) 49'; Tait 51'; Ainsworth 62'	BBC Report	van der Weg (yellow card) 39'; Quinn (yellow card) 53'; Schalk 78'	Stadium: Fir Park; Attendance: 3,177; Referee: Nick Walsh

5 November 2016 13	Dundee	2–0	Motherwell	Dundee
15:00 GMT (UTC)	Kerr 40'; Haber 80'; Williams (yellow card) 90+4'	BBC Report	Hammell (yellow card) 42'; McManus (yellow card) 54'	Stadium: Dens Park; Attendance: 5,471; Referee: John Beaton

19 November 2016 14	Motherwell	2–0	Partick Thistle	Motherwell
15:00 GMT (UTC)	Moult 14'; McDonald 38'; Tait (yellow card) 90+2'	BBC Report	Devine (yellow card) 15'; Welsh (yellow card) 45+1'; Osman (yellow card) 86'; Booth (yellow card) 90+2'	Stadium: Fir Park; Attendance: 3,759; Referee: Andrew Dallas

26 November 2016 15	Heart of Midlothian	3–0	Motherwell	Edinburgh
15:00 GMT (UTC)	Johnsen 31', 49'; Smith (yellow card) 45+2'; Walker 66'	BBC Report	Tait (yellow card) 10'	Stadium: Tynecastle Stadium; Attendance: 16,199; Referee: Bobby Madden

3 December 2016 16	Motherwell	3–4	Celtic	Motherwell
12:15 GMT (UTC)	Moult 3', 35' (yellow card) 28'; MacLean (yellow card) 43'; McManus (yellow card) 63'; Ainsworth 71' (yellow card) 74'	BBC Report	Izaguirre (yellow card) 25'; McGregor 48'; Brown (yellow card) 56'; Roberts 70'; Armstrong 72'; Rogic 90' (yellow card) 90+1'	Stadium: Fir Park; Attendance: 8,535; Referee: Kevin Clancy

10 December 2016 17	Motherwell	0–0	Kilmarnock	Motherwell
15:00 GMT (UTC)	Lucas (yellow card) 59'; Lasley (yellow card) 71'	BBC Report	S.Boyd (yellow card) 51'; Dicker (yellow card) 84'; Boyle (yellow card) 88'	Stadium: Fir Park; Attendance: 3,684; Referee: Steven McLean

13 December 2016 10	Aberdeen	0–0; Abandoned after 8 minutes due to floodlight failure	Motherwell	Aberdeen
19:45 GMT (UTC)		BBC Report		Stadium: Pittodrie Stadium; Referee: Alan Muir

17 December 2016 18	St Johnstone	1–1	Motherwell	Perth
15:00 GMT (UTC)	Kane 62'; Foster (yellow card) 90'	BBC Report	Clark 12' (o.g.); Moult (yellow card) 77'	Stadium: McDiarmid Park; Attendance: 2,836; Referee: Willie Collum

23 December 2016 19	Motherwell	1–3	Aberdeen	Motherwell
19:45 GMT (UTC)	McDonald 16' (yellow card) 77'; Clay (yellow card) 63'	BBC Report	Shinnie 6'; Rooney 25'; Reynolds (yellow card) 70'; Jack (yellow card) 73'; McGinn 90'	Stadium: Fir Park; Attendance: 3,428; Referee: Bobby Madden

28 December 2016 20	Inverness Caledonian Thistle	1–2	Motherwell	Inverness
19:45 GMT (UTC)	Cole (yellow card) 36'; McKay (yellow card) 40'; Fisher (yellow card) 77'; Vigurs (yellow card) 89'; Tansey 90'	BBC Report	Clay 50'; Moult (yellow card) 59'; McDonald 87'	Stadium: Caledonian Stadium; Attendance: 3,097; Referee: Barry Cook

31 December 2016 21	Hamilton Academical	1–1	Motherwell	Hamilton
13:00 GMT (UTC)	Sarris (yellow card) 24'; D'Acol 54'; Kurtaj (yellow card) 56'	BBC Report	Lucas (red card) 27'; McDonald (yellow card) 56'; Moult 90+3' (yellow card) 90+4'	Stadium: New Douglas Park; Attendance: 3,526; Referee: Euan Anderson

28 January 2017 22	Motherwell	0–2	Rangers	Motherwell
12:30 GMT (UTC)	McDonald (red card) 27'	BBC Report	O'Halloran (red card) 5'; Kiernan (yellow card) 12'; Miller 72'; Hill (yellow card) 80'; Hyndman 87'	Stadium: Fir Park; Attendance: 7,902; Referee: Willie Collum

31 January 2017 23	Ross County	1–2	Motherwell	Dingwall
19:45 GMT (UTC)	McEveley 34'; Chow (yellow card) 60'; Lalkovič (yellow card) 90+3'	BBC Report	McDonald 28'; Samson (yellow card) 34'; Moult 54'; McManus (yellow card) 67'	Stadium: Global Energy Stadium; Attendance: 2,511; Referee: Steven McLean

4 February 2017 24	Motherwell	0–3	Heart of Midlothian	Motherwell
12:15 GMT (UTC)	Tait (yellow card) 17'; Lasley (yellow card) 28'; McHugh (red card) 53'; Heneghan (yellow card) 72'	BBC Sport	Walker (yellow card) 33'; Martin (yellow card) 43'; Tziolis 59'; Gonçalves 84', 88' (yellow card) 85'	Stadium: Fir Park; Attendance: 4,651; Referee: Andrew Dallas

15 February 2017 10	Aberdeen	7–2	Motherwell	Aberdeen
19:45 GMT (UTC)	Hayes 2'; Considine 32' (yellow card) 50'; Rooney 34', 64' (pen.), 69'; Christie 40'; Taylor (yellow card) 59'; Pawlett 83'	BBC Report	Lucas (yellow card) 30'; Bowman 73'; Pearson 82'	Stadium: Pittodrie Stadium; Attendance: 10,384; Referee: Alan Muir

18 February 2017 25	Celtic	2–0	Motherwell	Glasgow
15:00 GMT (UTC)	Dembélé 34' (pen.); Forrest 41'	BBC Report	Bowman (yellow card) 65'	Stadium: Celtic Park; Attendance: 56,366; Referee: Don Robertson

25 February 2017 26	Motherwell	1–5	Dundee	Motherwell
15:00 GMT (UTC)	Moult 22' (yellow card) 69'; Heneghan (yellow card) 45+1'; McDonald (yellow card) 84'	BBC Report	Jules 7' (o.g.); Haber 27', 45+1'; O'Hara 31'; Wighton 35'; Vincent (yellow card) 74'	Stadium: Fir Park; Attendance: 4,002; Referee: Stephen Finnie

4 March 2017 27	Kilmarnock	1–2	Motherwell	Kilmarnock
15:00 GMT (UTC)	Boyd 32'	BBC Report	Lasley (yellow card) 22'; McHugh 51' (yellow card) 90+1'; Heneghan (yellow card) 69'; Jules 76'; Cadden (yellow card) 90+1'	Stadium: Rugby Park; Attendance: 4,726; Referee: Bobby Madden

11 March 2017 28	Aberdeen	1–0	Motherwell	Aberdeen
15:00 GMT (UTC)	Stockley (yellow card) 82'; McGinn 90+2'	BBC Report	Heneghan (yellow card) 13'; Bowman (yellow card) 32'; Pearson (yellow card) 69'; Hammell (yellow card) 72'; Ferguson (yellow card) 75'; Cadden (yellow card) 90'	Stadium: Pittodrie Stadium; Attendance: 12,524; Referee: Euan Anderson

18 March 2017 29	Motherwell	1–2	St Johnstone	Motherwell
15:00 GMT (UTC)	McDonald 44'	BBC Report	Craig 8', 66'; Davidson (yellow card) 78'	Stadium: Fir Park; Attendance: 3,588; Referee: Greg Aitken

1 April 2017 30	Rangers	1–1	Motherwell	Glasgow
15:00 BST (UTC+1)	Waghorn (yellow card) 22'; Toral (yellow card) 43'; Garner 61'	BBC Report	Moult 3'; Pearson (yellow card) 31'; McHugh (yellow card) 66'; Lasley (yellow card) 74'; McDonald (yellow card) 88'	Stadium: Ibrox Stadium; Attendance: 49,198; Referee: Steven McLean

5 April 2017 31	Motherwell	0–0	Hamilton Academical	Motherwell
19:45 BST (UTC+1)	Pearson (yellow card) 45+1'	BBC Report	Skondras (yellow card) 59'; MacKinnon (red card) 74'; Sarris (yellow card) 80'	Stadium: Fir Park; Attendance: 4,644; Referee: Kevin Clancy

8 April 2017 32	Partick Thistle	1–0	Motherwell	Glasgow
15:00 BST (UTC+1)	Doolan 11'	BBC Report		Stadium: Firhill Stadium; Attendance: 3,920; Referee: John Beaton

15 April 2017 33	Motherwell	3–2	Inverness Caledonian Thistle	Motherwell
15:00 BST (UTC+1)	Cadden 7'; Moult 9'; McDonald 65'; Campbell 70'	BBC Report	Fisher 21', 54'; McKay (yellow card) 89'	Stadium: Fir Park; Attendance: 3,696; Referee: Willie Collum

29 April 2017 34	Motherwell	2–3	Dundee	Motherwell
15:00 GMT (UTC)	Moult 50'; Cadden 80'; McHugh (yellow card) 90+3'	BBC Report	Gomis (yellow card) 29'; O'Hara 45', 56'; Haber 49' (yellow card) 90+3'	Stadium: Fir Park; Attendance: 4,919; Referee: Steven McLean

6 May 2017 35	Motherwell	0–1	Ross County	Motherwell
15:00 GMT (UTC)		BBC Report	van der Weg (yellow card) 44'; O'Brien (yellow card) 61'; Routis 72'	Stadium: Fir Park; Attendance: 3,870; Referee: Bobby Madden

13 May 2017 36	Hamilton Academical	0–1	Motherwell	Hamilton
15:00 GMT (UTC)	Devlin (yellow card) 11'; Crawford (yellow card) 30'; Matthews (yellow card) 56'; Docherty (yellow card) 69'; MacKinnon (yellow card) 77'; Templeton (yellow card) 88'	Report	McDonald (yellow card) 34'; Lasley (yellow card) 36'; McHugh (yellow card) 41'; Campbell (yellow card) 43'; Moult 66'	Stadium: New Douglas Park; Attendance: 4,173; Referee: Kevin Clancy

16 May 2017 37	Motherwell	3–1	Kilmarnock	Motherwell
19:45 GMT (UTC)	McHugh 1'; Lasley (yellow card) 11'; Ferguson (yellow card) 31'; Clay (yellow card) 48'; Ainsworth 53'; Cadden (yellow card) 76'; Frear 78'; Moult (yellow card) 82'	Report	Frizzell 17'; Ajer (yellow card) 49'; Taylor (yellow card) 52'; Dicker (yellow card) 90+2'	Stadium: Fir Park; Attendance: 5,246; Referee: Nick Walsh

20 May 2017 38	Inverness Caledonian Thistle	3–2	Motherwell	Inverness
15:00 GMT (UTC)	Tansey 64'; Fisher 66', 67'	Report	McFadden 73'; Bowman 90+3'	Stadium: Caledonian Stadium; Attendance: 5,351; Referee: Craig Thomson

=== Scottish Cup ===
21 January 2017 Fourth round	Rangers	2–1	Motherwell	Glasgow
12:30 GMT (UTC)	Miller 84', 89'	BBC Report	Chalmers (yellow card) 59'; Moult 74'; McDonald (yellow card) 78'; McHugh (yellow card) 90+5'	Stadium: Ibrox Stadium; Attendance: 31,921; Referee: Craig Thomson

=== League Cup ===
==== Group stage ====
Pos	Team	Pld	W	PW	PL	L	GF	GA	GD	Pts	Qualification	RAN	MOT	STR	ANN	EST
1	Rangers (Q)	4	4	0	0	0	10	0	+10	12	Qualification for the Second Round	—	—	3–0	2–0	—
2	Motherwell (Q)	4	3	0	0	1	9	3	+6	9	Qualification for the Second Round	0–2	—	—	—	3–0
3	Stranraer	4	2	0	0	2	5	8	−3	6		—	0–3	—	—	3–1
4	Annan Athletic	4	1	0	0	3	4	7	−3	3		—	1–3	1–2	—	—
5	East Stirlingshire	4	0	0	0	4	1	11	−10	0		0–3	—	—	0–2	—

Source: SPFL
(Q) Qualified to the phase indicated

16 July 2016 1	Motherwell	0–2	Rangers	Motherwell
15:00 BST (UTC+1)	McDonald (yellow card) 62'; McHugh (yellow card) 77'	Report	Tavernier 48'; Forrester (yellow card) 52'; Windass (yellow card) 82'; Waghorn 90+1'	Stadium: Fir Park; Attendance: 6,951; Referee: Steven McLean

23 July 2016 2	Annan Athletic	1–3	Motherwell	Annan
15:00 BST (UTC+1)	R.Krissian (yellow card) 4'; R.Omar 44'; P.Watson (yellow card) 55'; McKenna (yellow card) 66'	Report	Johnson 16'; Moult 61', 63'; McHugh (yellow card) 70'	Stadium: Galabank; Attendance: 956; Referee: Nick Walsh

26 July 2016 3	Motherwell	3–0	East Stirlingshire	Motherwell
19:45 BST (UTC+1)	Johnson 53'; McDonald 76'; Cadden 87'	Report		Stadium: Fir Park; Attendance: 2,503; Referee: Craig Charleston

30 July 2016 4	Stranraer	0–3	Motherwell	Stranraer
15:00 BST (UTC+1)	Dick (yellow card) 42'	Report	Cadden 51'; Johnson 84'; McDonald 86'	Stadium: Stair Park; Attendance: 953; Referee: Don Robertson

==== Knockout stage ====
9 August 2016 Last 16	Celtic	5–0	Motherwell	Glasgow
19:45 BST (UTC+1)	Rogic 20', 76'; Dembélé 34' (pen.), 64'; Sinclair 61'	Report		Stadium: Celtic Park; Attendance: 20,165; Referee: Kevin Clancy

=== Challenge Cup ===
2 August 2016 First Round	Motherwell U-20	2–1	Edinburgh City	Motherwell
19:45 BST (UTC+1)	Mackin 37'; T.Fry 60'	Report	J. Dunn (yellow card) 48'; Cummings 73'; I.McFarland (yellow card) 84'; G.Donaldson (yellow card) 90+1'	Stadium: Fir Park; Attendance: 402; Referee: Lloyd Wilson

16 August 2016 Second Round	Motherwell U-20	1–2	Airdrieonians	Motherwell
19:45 BST (UTC+1)	Mackin 54'	Report	I Russell 45+1'; Ryan 49'; K.Schmidt (yellow card) 69'	Stadium: Fir Park; Attendance: 1,007; Referee: Mike Taylor

== Squad statistics ==
=== Appearances ===
As of match played 20 May 2017

No.	Pos	Nat	Player	Total		Scottish Premiership		Scottish Cup		League Cup	
No.	Pos	Nat	Player	Apps	Goals	Apps	Goals	Apps	Goals	Apps	Goals
1	GK	(Scotland) SCO	Craig Samson	40	0	34	0	1	0	5	0
2	DF	(Scotland) SCO	Richard Tait	31	1	25	1	1	0	5	0
3	DF	(Scotland) SCO	Steven Hammell	31	0	24+1	0	1	0	5	0
4	DF	(England) ENG	Ben Heneghan	43	0	37	0	1	0	5	0
6	DF	(Scotland) SCO	Stephen McManus	31	0	25	0	1	0	5	0
7	MF	(England) ENG	Lionel Ainsworth	35	4	10+20	4	0	0	3+2	0
8	MF	(Republic of Ireland) IRL	Carl McHugh	22	2	19	2	1	0	2	0
9	FW	(England) ENG	Louis Moult	34	18	30+1	15	1	1	1+1	2
11	FW	(England) ENG	Ryan Bowman	24	2	11+13	2	0	0	0	0
12	MF	(Scotland) SCO	Chris Cadden	42	5	36	3	1	0	4+1	2
13	GK	(England) ENG	Russell Griffiths	4	0	4	0	0	0	0	0
14	MF	(Scotland) SCO	Keith Lasley	34	0	26+3	0	1	0	4	0
15	DF	(Scotland) SCO	Joe Chalmers	13	0	7+1	0	1	0	2+2	0
17	MF	(England) ENG	Elliott Frear	15	1	11+4	1	0	0	0	0
18	MF	(Wales) WAL	Lee Lucas	11	0	6+4	0	0	0	1	0
19	FW	(England) ENG	Jacob Blyth	9	0	1+7	0	0	0	0+1	0
20	MF	(England) ENG	Craig Clay	39	1	31+4	1	1	0	3	0
21	DF	(Scotland) SCO	Zak Jules	10	1	6+4	1	0	0	0	0
24	FW	(Scotland) SCO	James McFadden	6	2	0+6	2	0	0	0	0
25	DF	(Scotland) SCO	David Ferguson	10	0	7+3	0	0	0	0	0
26	MF	(Scotland) SCO	Allan Campbell	7	1	6+1	1	0	0	0	0
27	MF	(Scotland) SCO	Ross MacLean	8	0	4+3	0	0	0	0+1	0
30	DF	(Scotland) SCO	Jack McMillan	15	0	9+5	0	0+1	0	0	0
34	MF	(Scotland) SCO	Jake Hastie	3	0	0+3	0	0	0	0	0
36	MF	(Northern Ireland) NIR	Shea Gordon	4	0	2+2	0	0	0	0	0
43	DF	(Scotland) SCO	Adam Livingstone	2	0	0+2	0	0	0	0	0
77	FW	(Australia) AUS	Scott McDonald	40	11	34+1	9	0+1	0	4	2
88	MF	(Scotland) SCO	Stephen Pearson	11	1	10+1	1	0	0	0	0
Players away from the club on loan:
23	MF	(Scotland) SCO	Dom Thomas	7	0	0+4	0	0	0	1+2	0
29	FW	(Scotland) SCO	Dylan Mackin	2	0	0	0	0	0	0+2	0
Players who left Motherwell during the season:
11	MF	(England) ENG	Marvin Johnson	9	4	4	1	0	0	5	3

=== Goal scorers ===
As of match played 20 May 2017

Ranking	Nation	Position	Number	Name	Scottish Premiership	Scottish Cup	League Cup	Total
1	FW	(England)	9	Louis Moult	15	1	2	18
2	FW	(Australia)	77	Scott McDonald	9	0	2	11
3	MF	(Scotland)	12	Chris Cadden	3	0	2	5
4	MF	(England)	7	Lionel Ainsworth	4	0	0	4
4	MF	(England)	11	Marvin Johnson	1	0	3	4
6	MF	(Republic of Ireland)	8	Carl McHugh	2	0	0	2
6	FW	(Scotland)	24	James McFadden	2	0	0	2
6	FW	(England)	11	Ryan Bowman	2	0	0	2
6				Own goal	2	0	0	2
10	DF	(Scotland)	2	Richard Tait	1	0	0	1
10	MF	(England)	20	Craig Clay	1	0	0	1
10	MF	(Scotland)	88	Stephen Pearson	1	0	0	1
10	DF	(Scotland)	21	Zak Jules	1	0	0	1
10	MF	(Scotland)	26	Allan Campbell	1	0	0	1
10	MF	(England)	17	Elliott Frear	1	0	0	1
TOTALS					46	1	9	56

=== Clean sheets ===
As of match played 20 May 2017

Ranking	Nation	Position	Number	Name	Scottish Premiership	Scottish Cup	League Cup	Total
1	GK	(Scotland)	1	Craig Samson	4	0	2	6
2	GK	(England)	13	Russell Griffiths	1	0	0	1
TOTALS					5	0	2	7

=== Disciplinary record ===
As of match played 20 May 2017

Number	Nation	Position	Name	Premiership		Scottish Cup		League Cup		Total	
Number	Nation	Position	Name	Yellow card	Red card	Yellow card	Red card	Yellow card	Red card	Yellow card	Red card
1	(Scotland)	GK	Craig Samson	1	0	0	0	0	0	1	0
2	(Scotland)	DF	Richard Tait	6	0	0	0	0	0	6	0
3	(Scotland)	DF	Steven Hammell	2	0	0	0	0	0	2	0
4	(England)	DF	Ben Heneghan	7	0	0	0	0	0	7	0
6	(Scotland)	DF	Stephen McManus	4	0	0	0	0	0	4	0
7	(England)	MF	Lionel Ainsworth	1	0	0	0	0	0	1	0
8	(Republic of Ireland)	MF	Carl McHugh	5	1	1	0	2	0	8	1
9	(England)	FW	Louis Moult	7	0	0	0	0	0	7	0
11	(England)	FW	Ryan Bowman	2	0	0	0	0	0	2	0
12	(Scotland)	MF	Chris Cadden	4	0	0	0	0	0	4	0
14	(Scotland)	MF	Keith Lasley	8	0	0	0	0	0	8	0
15	(Scotland)	MF	Joe Chalmers	0	0	1	0	0	0	1	0
18	(Wales)	MF	Lee Lucas	2	1	0	0	0	0	2	1
20	(England)	MF	Craig Clay	4	0	0	0	0	0	4	0
25	(Scotland)	DF	David Ferguson	2	0	0	0	0	0	2	0
26	(Scotland)	MF	Allan Campbell	1	0	0	0	0	0	1	0
27	(Scotland)	MF	Ross MacLean	1	0	0	0	0	0	1	0
77	(Australia)	FW	Scott McDonald	6	1	1	0	1	0	8	1
88	(Scotland)	MF	Stephen Pearson	3	0	0	0	0	0	3	0
Players away on loan:
Players who left Motherwell during the season:
11	(England)	MF	Marvin Johnson	1	0	0	0	0	0	1	0
			TOTALS	67	3	3	0	3	0	73	3

== See also ==
- List of Motherwell F.C. seasons
