= Dylan Mackin =

Scottish footballer (born 1997)

Personal information
- Date of birth: 15 January 1997 (age 29)
- Place of birth: Irvine, Scotland
- Position: Striker

Team information
- Current team: Kilwinning Rangers

Senior career*
Years	Team	Apps	(Gls)
2013–2017	Motherwell	1	(0)
2016	→ Airdrieonians (loan)	11	(2)
2017	→ Alloa Athletic (loan)	12	(4)
2017–2018	Livingston	14	(4)
2018	→ Brechin City (loan)	11	(1)
2018	Falkirk	3	(0)
2018–2022	Stirling Albion	91	(19)
2022-2024	Kilwinning Rangers	33	(13)
- * Club domestic league appearances and goals as of 15:50, 17 September 2023 (UTC)

Dylan Mackin (born 15 January 1997) is a Scottish retired footballer who last played as a striker for West of Scotland Football League side Kilwinning Rangers.

He has previously played for Falkirk, Motherwell, Livingston, and on loan for Airdrieonians, Alloa Athletic, Stirling Albion and Brechin City.

== Career ==
Mackin is a product of the Motherwell Academy. On 13 December 2015, he made his debut for Motherwell as a substitute in the closing stages of a 3–1 home win against Dundee. In January 2016, Mackin and fellow Motherwell player David Ferguson moved on loan to Airdrieonians until the end of the season. On 27 January 2017, Mackin moved on a development loan to Alloa Athletic. He was released by Motherwell in May 2017 at the end of his contract.

On 20 June 2017, Mackin signed for Livingston, agreeing a two-year contract. He then moved on loan to Brechin City on 30 January 2018.

Mackin signed for Falkirk on a one-year deal on 10 July 2018.

Mackin was released from Falkirk on 5 October 2018 after only making a handful of appearances and little goals; he was released as Ray Mackinnon began his clear out of the squad.

The next stage of his career took him to Forthbank Stadium, to sign with Stirling Albion.

Upon his release from Stirling Albion in 2022, he signed a two-year deal with West of Scotland Football League side Kilwinning Rangers.

He finished as top scorer in his first season with 21 goals in all competitions. In his second season, he was injured in October and ruled out for the remainder of the season. He scored 10 goals in that time. He retired from playing in late 2024 due to a recurring injury. He now coaches the under 20's side.

== Career statistics ==
As of match played 13 August 2022

Appearances and goals by club, season and competition
Club	Season	League			Scottish Cup		League Cup		Other		Total	
Club	Season	Division	Apps	Goals	Apps	Goals	Apps	Goals	Apps	Goals	Apps	Goals
Motherwell	2014–15	Scottish Premiership	0	0	0	0	0	0	0	0	0	0
Motherwell	2015–16	Scottish Premiership	1	0	0	0	0	0	0	0	1	0
Motherwell	2016–17	Scottish Premiership	0	0	0	0	2	0	2 (Note: Appearances for Motherwell U-20s in the Scottish Challenge Cup)	2	4	2
Motherwell	Total		1	0	0	0	2	0	2	2	5	2
Airdrieonians (loan)	2015–16	Scottish League One	11	2	1	0	0	0	0	0	12	2
Alloa Athletic (loan)	2016–17	Scottish League One	12	3	0	0	0	0	4 (Note: Appearances in the Championship play-offs)	1	16	4
Livingston	2017–18	Scottish Championship	14	4	1	2	4	1	2 (Note: Appearances in the Scottish Challenge Cup)	1	21	8
Brechin City (loan)	2017–18	Scottish Championship	11	1	0	0	0	0	0	0	11	1
Falkirk	2018–19	Scottish Championship	3	0	0	0	4	2	1	0	8	2
Stirling Albion	2018–19	Scottish League Two	23	9	0	0	0	0	0	0	23	9
Stirling Albion	2019–20	Scottish League Two	21	3	1	0	4	1	1	0	27	4
Stirling Albion	2020–21	Scottish League Two	16	3	1	0	3	1	0	0	20	4
Stirling Albion	2021–22	Scottish League Two	11	3	1	1	3	1	0	0	15	5
Stirling Albion	Total		71	18	3	1	10	3	1	0	85	22
Kilwinning Rangers	2022–23	WoSFL Premier Division	3	1	0	0	-	-	0 (Note: Appearances in the WoSFL Cup and South Region Challenge Cup)	0	3	1
Career total			117	27	4	1	20	6	10	4	150	38

== Honours ==
Alloa Athletic

- League One: 2016–17

Kilwinning Rangers

- Eglinton Cup: 2022
