= Luke Watt =

Scottish footballer (born 1997)

Personal information
- Date of birth: 20 June 1997 (age 29)
- Place of birth: Glasgow, Scotland
- Position: Defender

Team information
- Current team: Stranraer

Senior career*
Years	Team	Apps	(Gls)
2014–2018	Motherwell	7	(0)
2016–2017	→ Stranraer (loan)	12	(0)
2017	→ East Fife (loan)	3	(0)
2017–2018	→ Airdrieonians (loan)	26	(1)
2018–2019	NK Novigrad		
2019–2020	Brechin City	11	(2)
2020–2022	Linlithgow Rose		
2022–	Stranraer		
- * Club domestic league appearances and goals as of 13:00, 19 December 2020 (UTC)

Luke Watt (born 20 June 1997) is a Scottish footballer who plays as a defender for Stranraer.

He has previously played for Motherwell, Airdrieonians, Stranraer, East Fife, Croatian side NK Novigrad, Brechin City and Linlithgow Rose.

== Career ==
=== Club ===
On 4 January 2015, Watt made his debut for Motherwell, starting in a 2–0 defeat against Aberdeen. On 2 March 2015, Watt signed a new contract with Motherwell until the summer of 2018.

On 31 August 2016, Watt signed on loan for Stranraer, on a deal until January 2017. On 31 January 2017, he went out on loan again, joining East Fife for the remainder of the season.

On 18 August 2017, Watt went out on loan a third time, this time joining Airdrieonians. Watt was released by Motherwell at the end of the 2017–18 season.

After a spell in Croatia with NK Novigrad, Watt signed for Brechin City in June 2019.

Linlithgow Rose announced the signing of Watt on 19 December 2020.

== Career statistics ==
As of 19 December 2020

Club	Season	League			National Cup		League Cup		Other		Total	
Club	Season	Division	Apps	Goals	Apps	Goals	Apps	Goals	Apps	Goals	Apps	Goals
Motherwell	2014–15	Scottish Premiership	5	0	0	0	0	0	0	0	5	0
Motherwell	2015–16	Scottish Premiership	2	0	0	0	1	0	0	0	3	0
Motherwell	2016–17	Scottish Premiership	0	0	0	0	0	0	2 (Note: Appearances for Motherwell Under-20s in the Scottish Challenge Cup in which age-restricted sides from the Scottish Premiership clubs compete against senior clubs)	0	2	0
Motherwell	2017–18	Scottish Premiership	0	0	0	0	0	0	0	0	0	0
Motherwell	Total		7	0	0	0	1	0	2	0	10	0
Stranraer (loan)	2016–17	Scottish League One	12	0	0	0	0	0	0	0	12	0
East Fife (loan)	2016–17	Scottish League One	3	0	1	0	0	0	0	0	4	0
Airdrieonians (loan)	2017–18	Scottish League One	26	1	0	0	0	0	0	0	26	1
Brechin City	2019–20	Scottish League Two	11	2	0	0	1	0	1 (Note: Appearances in the Scottish Challenge Cup)	0	13	2
Career total			59	3	1	0	2	0	3	0	65	3
