= Ben Heneghan =

English footballer

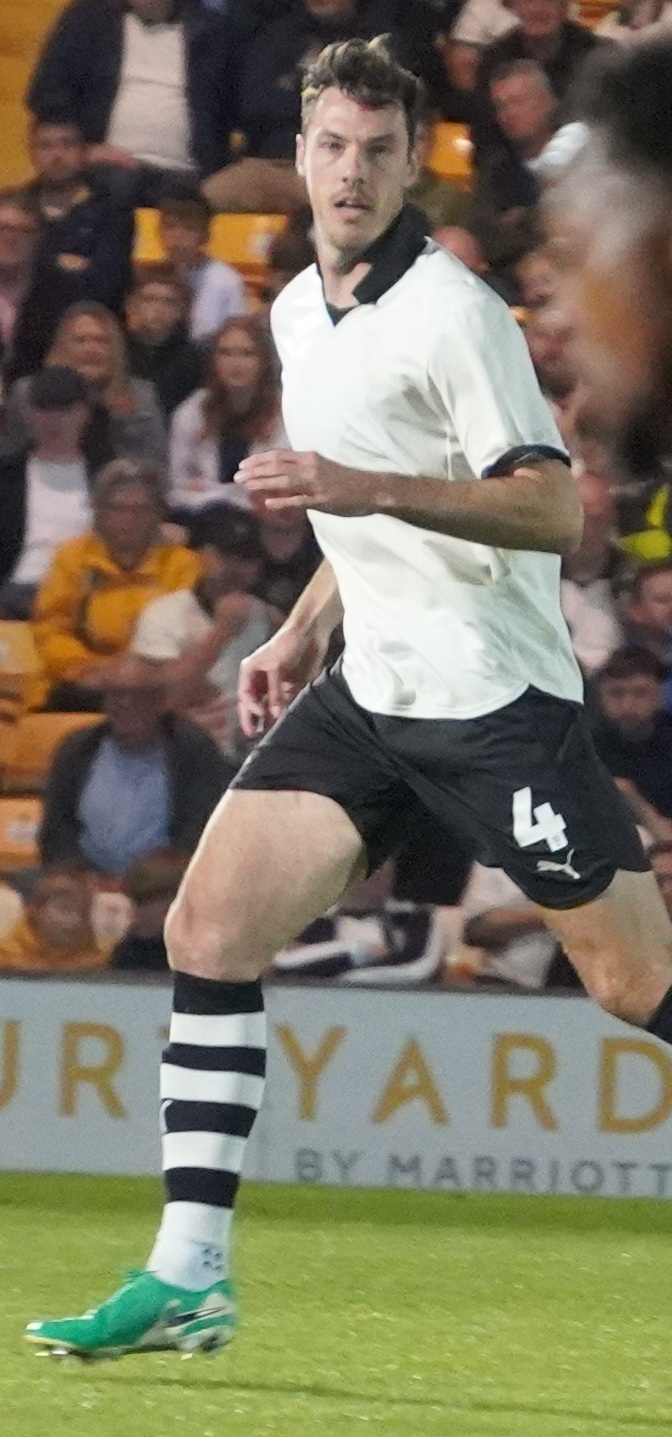
- Heneghan in Port Vale colours (2025)

Personal information
- Full name: Benjamin John Heneghan
- Date of birth: 19 September 1993 (age 33)
- Place of birth: Manchester, England
- Height: 6 ft 3 in (1.91 m)
- Position: Centre-back

Team information
- Current team: Crawley Town

Youth career
- 2005–2012: Everton
- 2012–2014: Stoke City

Senior career*
Years	Team	Apps	(Gls)
2013–2014	Stoke City	0	(0)
2014	→ Droylsden (loan)	8	(0)
2014–2016	Chester	81	(6)
2016–2017	Motherwell	41	(1)
2017–2020	Sheffield United	0	(0)
2018–2020	→ Blackpool (loan)	68	(3)
2020–2022	AFC Wimbledon	64	(4)
2022–2023	Sheffield Wednesday	10	(0)
2023–2024	Fleetwood Town	37	(0)
2024–2026	Port Vale	49	(0)
2026–	Crawley Town	0	(0)

International career
2015–2016	England C	3	(0)
- * Club domestic league appearances and goals as of 21:26, 28 April 2026 (UTC)

Benjamin John Heneghan (born 19 September 1993) is an English professional footballer who plays as a centre-back for EFL League Two club Crawley Town. He has been capped by the England C team.

Heneghan spent his youth with Everton and Stoke City, though did not play a first-team game at either club. He had a loan spell in the Northern Premier League with Droylsden before spending two years in the National League with Chester from August 2014. He won a move to the Scottish Premiership with Motherwell in June 2016. He returned to England to join Sheffield United in August 2017, though he would only make one cup appearance in three years. He spent two seasons on loan at Blackpool. In November 2020, he signed with AFC Wimbledon, before he moved on to Sheffield Wednesday in June 2022. A knee injury brought his 2022–23 season to a premature end in October. He then spent the 2023–24 campaign with Fleetwood Town, which ended in relegation from League One in what was his sixth season in the third tier. He joined Port Vale in July 2024 and was promoted out of League Two with the club at the end of the 2024–25 season. He spent one further season with the club and went on to join Crawley Town in November 2026.

== Career ==
=== Early years ===
Heneghan started his career at Everton at the age of eleven and spent seven years in the club's Academy. He played alongside Ross Barkley under Alan Stubbs and David Weir in the reserve team at Goodison Park. In April 2012, he made the move to Stoke City, where he captained the under-21 team under Dave Kevan. He had a loan spell at struggling Northern Premier League Premier Division side Droylsden, scoring an own goal in a 13–1 defeat at Chorley. He did not make a senior appearance for Stoke and was released at the end of the 2013–14 season. He then spent time on trial at Oldham Athletic and Accrington Stanley.

=== Chester ===
On 15 August 2014, Heneghan joined National League club Chester, initially on non-contract terms. He made his debut the following day, coming on at right-back as a half-time substitute against Braintree Town. On 24 September, Heneghan scored his first professional goal, a 94th-minute winner against Cross-border derby rivals Wrexham. He later said "I will take that memory to my death bed". Two days later he agreed a contract until the end of the 2014–15 season. Heneghan switched to his preferred central back position in January, when Chester signed right-back Ryan Higgins. On 30 March, Heneghan and Higgins signed new contracts until the end of the 2015–16 season. Heneghan finished the season as a first-choice centre-back playing 44 matches and scoring eight goals, including against Stockport County and Southend United in the Blues run to the second round of the FA Cup. He was named the club's Player of the Year. He was also shortlisted for the National League Player of the Year and Rising Star awards at the MBNA Northwest Football Awards.

Heneghan made his debut for the England C team on 1 June 2015 in a 2–1 win over Republic of Ireland U21, describing it as a "huge honour". He also played in a 2–0 win in Ukraine and a 4–3 defeat to Slovakia. He started the 2015–16 season building a strong partnership in the middle of the defence with the experienced Ian Sharps. On 19 September, Heneghan scored the winning goal against Eastleigh. He received the first red card of his career the following week in a 5–2 defeat at Woking. During the season, Heneghan was reported to be attracting interest from clubs in the Football League and in Scotland. However, he had not ruled out remaining with Chester. Manager Steve Burr said he expected the defender to be subject to a transfer offer due to his age and good form. Heneghan was later voted into Chester's Team of the Decade. Burr left the club and Heneghan was offered a new contract by new manager Jon McCarthy, though he chose to leave the Deva Stadium, with Chester requesting compensation from his new club as Heneghan was under the age of 24. Heneghan said he would not join another National League club ahead of Chester.

=== Motherwell ===
On 23 June 2016, Heneghan signed a two-year contract with Scottish Premiership club Motherwell after a deal with agreed with his agent Jake Speight. Manager Mark McGhee credited Martin Foyle for scouting Heneghan and said he would compete with Kieran Kennedy, Louis Laing and Stephen McManus for a centre-back position. He made his début at Fir Park in a 2–0 defeat to Rangers in the Scottish League Cup. The Well struggled defensively, however, as injuries to other players left the backline with an average age of 21. Heneghan credited McManus with aiding his development. He was reported to be a transfer target of Rangers, though new manager Stephen Robinson said that such speculation would not distract Heneghan from the Steelmen's ultimate successful battle against relegation at the end of the 2016–17 season. He spent a year in Scotland, playing exactly 50 games in all competitions, scoring one goal in a 2–1 home loss in the Scottish Premiership against Rangers. The club confirmed that Blackburn Rovers had made an approach for the player as they rejected a transfer bid of £250,000.

=== Sheffield United ===
On 31 August 2017, Heneghan signed for Championship club Sheffield United on a three-year contract. The transfer fee was later reported to be £400,000. Manager Chris Wilder admitted that Heneghan was not his first-choice signing and that he would have preferred to bring in a more experienced player "but our targets changed and we decided to have a punt on him". He made his first and what turned out to be only appearance for Sheffield United in an FA Cup tie against Preston North End in January 2018, where he was reported to have played well. Wilder decided to keep him at Bramall Lane as cover in the second half of the 2017–18 season rather than send him out on loan and rejected a transfer bid from Northampton Town. Heneghan did not feature again, however, and was transfer-listed at the end of the season.

On 3 July 2018, Heneghan moved on a season-long loan to League One club Blackpool. He was signed by Gary Bowyer, who resigned just one game into the campaign. After a difficult start, Heneghan settled into a defence that regularly kept clean sheets and he was frequently in contention for man of the match awards, leading manager Terry McPhillips to say that he would like to bring Heneghan back to Bloomfield Road in the summer transfer window. Heneghan won two awards at the club's end-of-season award's night. He remained transfer-listed at Sheffield United, however, who had won promotion to the Premier League in his absence, with Wilder commenting that "it annoys me immensely" that the transfer-listed players remained at the club. He was linked with moves to Reading, Sunderland and Hull City.

On 23 August 2019, Heneghan returned to Blackpool on a loan deal until January. He impressed, being voted the club's Player of the Month for October. He was linked with moves to Blackburn Rovers and Luton Town in the January transfer window. However, instead his Blackpool loan was extended until the end of the 2019–20 season. On 15 February, he was sent off in a 2–1 defeat at Bristol Rovers after a tough challenge on Jonson Clarke-Harris. Departing manager Simon Grayson had discussed signing him permanently. However, the COVID-19 pandemic in England brought the season due a premature end shortly afterwards and Heneghan admitted that "I never heard anything from [new manager] Critchley. I don't really think I'm his type of player".

Heneghan left Sheffield United at the end of the 2019–20 season, having been released on a free transfer. He then spent a short period out of the game as lockdown restrictions were imposed on the country. He was linked with moves to Preston North End and Millwall.

=== AFC Wimbledon ===
On 19 November 2020, Heneghan signed a contract of undisclosed length with League One club AFC Wimbledon. Manager Glyn Hodges commented that "it's unusual to sign a player of Ben's calibre outside the window". He had previously worked with Hodges at Stoke City's academy. He made his debut for Wimbledon as a substitute against Rochdale on 21 November. In his second appearance for the club he scored his first goal, in a 2–1 defeat to Gillingham on 24 November. He served as club captain under head coach Mark Robinson. He was in good form when he was hit with a seven-week hamstring injury lay-off. He played consistently well in the 2021–22 season, despite the Dons relegation. He left Plough Lane following Wimbledon's relegation after manager Johnnie Jackson admitted that it was unrealistic to be able to keep him at the club in League Two.

=== Sheffield Wednesday ===
On 14 June 2022, Heneghan joined League One club Sheffield Wednesday on an undisclosed-length deal. The Owls had struggled with set pieces and it was hoped that Heneghan's height would help to correct this issue. He made his Wednesday debut on 30 July, starting in a 3–3 draw with Portsmouth at Hillsborough. On 1 October, he was named in the EFL Team of the Week for his performance in a 1–0 win at Port Vale. On 22 October, he suffered a season-ending anterior cruciate ligament knee injury away at Lincoln City. He underwent surgery in December. Following promotion back to the Championship it was confirmed that Heneghan would be released following the end of his contract. Manager Darren Moore said the decision to release Heneghan was made by chairman Dejphon Chansiri. A claim denied by Chansiri, who insisted that Moore had made the decision. New manager Xisco Muñoz, meanwhile, explained that there was no longer room in the squad to re-sign Heneghan.

=== Fleetwood Town ===
On 21 September 2023, Heneghan joined Fleetwood Town on a contract of undisclosed length, becoming Lee Johnson's first signing as manager of the Cods. The team had endued a poor start to the 2023–24 season, conceding an excessive number of goals. He impressed on his debut at Burton Albion two days later, despite giving away a penalty, which Johnson blamed on a lack of match sharpness after ten months without a game. He was named in the EFL Team of the Week and the Football League Paper's Team of the Day for his performance in a 3–0 win over Port Vale at Highbury Stadium on 3 February. He was released at the end of the season after having made 37 League One starts in Fleetwood's unsuccessful attempt to avoid relegation.

=== Port Vale ===
On 24 July 2024, Heneghan joined League Two club Port Vale on a two-year contract, reuniting with former Sheffield Wednesday manager Darren Moore. On 16 November, he won praise for his performance in a 1–0 win at Morecambe having made 14 clearances, five interceptions and two tackles throughout the game. He was named on The Football League Paper's Team of the Day for his performance in a 2–1 win at Doncaster Rovers on 4 January. He picked up an injury during training in March was ruled out for the rest of the 2024–25 season. He played 25 league games, helping the team to secure an automatic promotion place.

He was named on EFL Team of the Week as he "orchestrated play from the back" in a 0–0 draw with Wycombe Wanderers on 15 November 2025. Two weeks later, he was again in the EFL Team of the Week after a "defensive masterclass" in a 1–0 defeat at Lincoln City. He sustained a concussion on 24 February and fell awkwardly, leading to him to be out of action for three months. The club were relegated by the time he returned to fitness. He was released upon the expiry of his contract. He was part of the 39-man Professional Footballers' Association (PFA) free agent squad in July 2026, and scored for Bradford City whilst on trial there.

=== Crawley Town ===
On 6 November 2026, Heneghan signed a three-month deal with League Two bottom club Crawley Town, following a short trial spell.

== Style of play ==
Heneghan is a strong and pacey centre-back with sound technical ability who has a professional attitude and quiet personality. He is an aerial threat with his height, though is not naturally skilled at playing out from the back.

== Career statistics ==
As of match played 28 April 2026

Appearances and goals by club, season and competition
Club	Season	League			National cup (Note: Includes FA Cup, Scottish Cup)		League cup (Note: Includes EFL Cup, Scottish League Cup)		Other		Total	
Club	Season	Division	Apps	Goals	Apps	Goals	Apps	Goals	Apps	Goals	Apps	Goals
Stoke City	2013–14	Premier League	0	0	0	0	0	0	—		0	0
Droylsden (loan)	2013–14	NPL Premier Division	8	0	0	0	—		0	0	8	0
Chester	2014–15	National League	38	5	4	2	—		2 (Note: Appearance(s) in FA Trophy)	1	44	8
Chester	2015–16	National League	43	1	1	0	—		5 (Note: Three appearances in FA Trophy, two appearances and one goal in Cheshire Senior Cup)	1	49	2
Chester	Total		81	6	5	2	0	0	7	2	93	10
Motherwell	2016–17	Scottish Premiership	37	0	1	0	5	0	—		43	0
Motherwell	2017–18	Scottish Premiership	4	1	0	0	3	0	—		7	1
Motherwell	Total		41	1	1	0	8	0	0	0	50	1
Sheffield United	2017–18	Championship	0	0	1	0	0	0	—		1	0
Sheffield United	2018–19	Championship	0	0	0	0	0	0	—		0	0
Sheffield United	2019–20	Premier League	0	0	0	0	0	0	—		0	0
Sheffield United	Total		0	0	1	0	0	0	0	0	1	0
Blackpool (loan)	2018–19	League One	42	1	3	0	3	0	1 (Note: Appearance(s) in Football League Trophy)	0	49	1
Blackpool (loan)	2019–20	League One	26	2	4	—		0	1	1	31	3
Blackpool (loan)	Total		68	3	7	0	3	0	2	1	80	4
AFC Wimbledon	2020–21	League One	23	2	1	0	—		0	0	24	2
AFC Wimbledon	2021–22	League One	41	2	3	0	3	0	0	0	47	2
AFC Wimbledon	Total		64	4	4	0	3	0	0	0	71	4
Sheffield Wednesday	2022–23	League One	10	0	0	0	2	0	1	0	13	0
Fleetwood Town	2023–24	League One	37	0	2	0	—		1	0	40	0
Port Vale	2024–25	League Two	25	0	1	0	0	0	4	0	30	0
Port Vale	2025–26	League One	24	0	3	0	2	0	6	0	35	0
Port Vale	Total		49	0	4	0	2	0	10	0	65	0
Crawley Town	2026–27	League Two	0	0	0	0	—		0	0	0	0
Career total			358	14	24	2	18	0	21	3	421	19

== Honours ==
Port Vale

- EFL League Two second-place promotion: 2024–25

Individual

- Chester Player of the Year: 2014–15
