= Stephen Pearson =

Scottish footballer

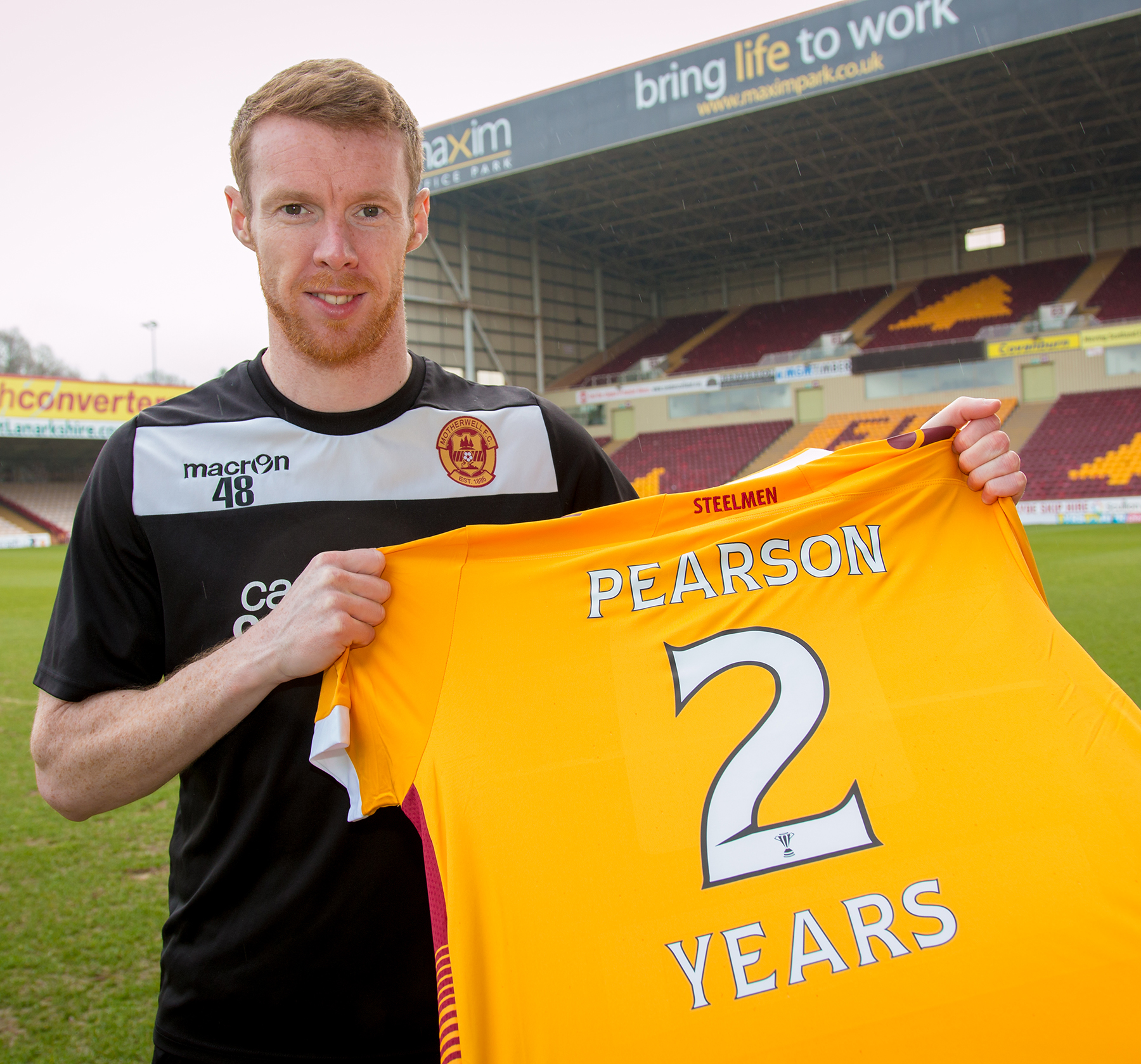
- Pearson after signing a new contract with Motherwell in 2015

Personal information
- Full name: Stephen Paul Pearson
- Date of birth: 2 October 1982 (age 44)
- Place of birth: Lanark, Scotland
- Height: 1.85 m (6 ft 1 in)
- Position: Midfielder

Senior career*
Years	Team	Apps	(Gls)
2000–2004	Motherwell	80	(12)
2004–2007	Celtic	56	(6)
2007–2012	Derby County	112	(4)
2008	→ Stoke City (loan)	4	(0)
2011–2012	→ Bristol City (loan)	28	(3)
2012–2014	Bristol City	36	(3)
2014	Kerala Blasters	17	(1)
2015–2016	Motherwell	39	(8)
2016	Atlético Kolkata	11	(2)
2017	Motherwell	11	(1)
Total		394	(39)

International career
2002–2003	Scotland U21	8	(0)
2003–2008	Scotland B	2	(0)
2003–2007	Scotland	10	(0)
- * Club domestic league appearances and goals

Stephen Paul Pearson (born 2 October 1982) is a Scottish former professional footballer who played as a midfielder.

He began his career at Motherwell and joined Celtic in 2004, where he won domestic honours including two Scottish Premier League titles. In January 2007 he moved to Derby County, whom he helped achieve promotion to the Premier League, later having loans at Stoke City and Bristol City, whom he joined permanently in 2012. After featuring for the Kerala Blasters in the inaugural season of the Indian Super League, Pearson returned to Motherwell in 2015 before mutually terminating his contract a year later to return to India with Atlético de Kolkata. He signed for Motherwell for a third time in February 2017.

Pearson earned ten caps for Scotland between 2003 and 2007.

== Club career ==
=== Early career ===
Pearson was born in Lanark. As a boy, he attended Our Lady's High School in Motherwell and is one of the school's numerous footballing alumni, a list whose notable members include Sir Matt Busby, Billy McNeill, and Bobby Murdoch. Though he grew up a Celtic fan, he began his footballing career at Motherwell, after they watched him score the winning goal in the final of the under-18 Scottish Schools competition.

Motherwell were a financially troubled club at this time and in 2002 they were placed in administration to prevent liquidation, with 19 senior players released. This period of adversity did however have one redeeming feature, as many young players, notably Pearson and his friend and fellow emerging talent James McFadden, gained instant elevation to first team status and a chance to develop and hone their skills more quickly than contemporaries at other clubs.

After a period of acclimatisation under new manager Terry Butcher during which Motherwell finished bottom of the SPL in the 2002–03 season, avoiding relegation only because Falkirk's Brockville Park ground failed to reach SPL standard, by December 2003 the youthful Motherwell team were comfortably in mid-table. Pearson's form was such that he gained a surprise call-up to Berti Vogts' full Scotland squad, winning his first cap in the 1–0 Euro 2004 play-off victory over the Netherlands, and attracted interest from clubs at home and abroad.

=== Celtic ===
However, Motherwell's financial predicament ensured they were unable to refuse any reasonable offers and when Celtic manager Martin O'Neill paid £350,000 of his own personal money in January 2004, Pearson fulfilled a childhood ambition by moving to Parkhead. He continued his fine form, notably in Celtic's epic UEFA Cup defeat of FC Barcelona, was in the starting eleven in the Cup Final and won the Scottish PFA Young Player of the Year award for the 2003–04 season.

Pearson was unable to match these achievements in 2004–05. He increased his international tally to six caps, but his first team opportunities were limited by injury, and he played just nine games for Celtic that season. The 2005–06 season saw little improvement as he made only three starting appearances in a relatively injury-hit season. In January 2006 he held talks with manager Gordon Strachan, who reassured him as to his future with the club. Pearson did however make 17 substitute appearances and scored a crucial goal against Hearts at Tynecastle as Celtic came from behind to win 3–2.

Though Pearson had been involved in two Scottish Premier League-winning campaigns with Celtic, he struggled to hold down a regular place. English Championship side Derby County, managed by his former Motherwell manager Billy Davies, made a bid of £600,000 in August 2006, but Strachan said he was not for sale. The departure of Stiliyan Petrov to Aston Villa gave Pearson an opportunity to regain a place in the Celtic midfield and, despite rumours of a move away from Celtic Park, he went on to score the third goal against Benfica in the group stages of the 2006–07 Champions League, to take the score to 3–0. He described this goal as "the moment of my career".

=== Derby County ===
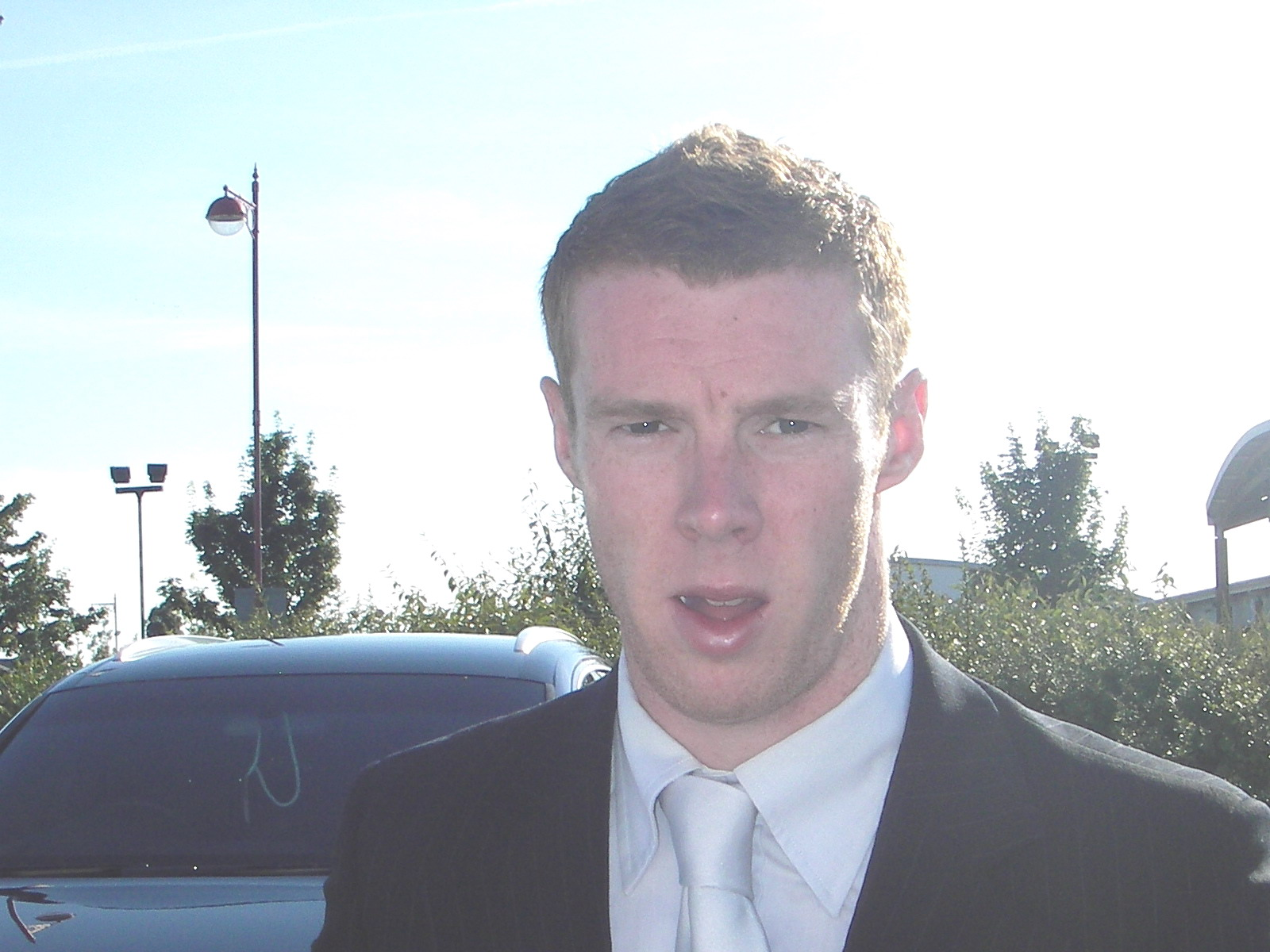
Pearson with Derby County in July 2007

Pearson eventually signed a three-and-a-half-year deal for Derby on 10 January 2007 for a fee of £750,000. and made his debut in a 1–0 win against Sheffield Wednesday, which put Derby level on points at the top of the division. A latter season drop in form saw the club finish in third place and having to compete in the playoffs. Pearson played a key role in Derby's success, winning a penalty in a 2–1 win over Southampton in the semi-final first leg and then scoring the winning goal, his first for the club, as Derby ran out 1–0 winners over West Bromwich Albion in the 2007 Championship playoff final. Pearson's strike has been described as "the £60 million goal", such is the perceived value of promotion from the Championship to the Premier League.

Derby struggled badly following promotion and, after a promising beginning to the season Pearson soon found himself out of the side. He was loaned out to Stoke City for three months at the end of the season but only made four appearances, though he did contribute to the club's promotion, his second in twelve months. Though the move was initially with a view to a permanent deal, Stoke decided not to follow up their interest and he returned to Derby. In July 2008, Birmingham City had a £600,000 bid accepted and Pearson agreed personal terms, but his medical examination revealed a groin tear; the clubs agreed a loan deal instead, but the player rejected this arrangement. When Pearson recovered, he won his place back in the side and scored against Swansea City in a 1–1 away draw, but after a handful of starts suffered another injury which kept him out for 4 months. Pearson made his return from injury in the final minutes of Derby's FA Cup 5th round tie against Manchester United on 15 February 2009, but suffered setbacks on his road to recovery, finally starting again for the club against Burnley on 4 April 2009. and appearing in a further five games before the season ended, finishing the season with just 13 appearances in all competitions. Pearson enjoyed a more productive 2009–10 season with the club, making 34 starts and making a further 8 appearances as sub and impressed enough to earn a new contract until the end of the 2011–12 season from Derby manager Nigel Clough. He got his third Derby goal, and his first for 18 months, with the consolation strike in a 2–1 defeat at Bristol City in the penultimate game of Derby's 2009–10 campaign before a knee operation ruled him out for the next four months, meaning he would miss pre-season and the first four to six weeks of the 2010–11 season.

Pearson returned to first team action as a second-half substitute in a 1–1 draw at Barnsley on 18 September 2010; Derby's seventh game of the 2010–11 season.

=== Bristol City ===
On 4 November 2011, Pearson joined Championship strugglers Bristol City on loan until 2 January 2012. He scored the opening goal on his debut against Burnley on 5 November 2011, a game which Bristol City won 3–1. Pearson impressed Bristol City manager Derek McInnes during his loan spell, with Rams manager Nigel Clough confirming talks between the two clubs over a potential permanent move in the January transfer window. On 6 January 2012, Pearson's contract at Derby was terminated by mutual consent and on the same day he signed for Bristol City on a contract until the end of the 2011–12 season. On 7 June 2012, Bristol City confirmed that Pearson had signed a two-year deal at the club. On 19 September 2013, it was announced that Pearson had undergone ankle surgery, keeping him out for six months. At the end of the 2013–14 season, Pearson was released by Bristol City.

=== Kerala Blasters ===
Pearson joined Indian Super League side Kerala Blasters for the 2014 season. On 16 December 2014, he scored his first goal for the club in the 117th minute of second leg of the play-off semifinals against Chennaiyin FC with a neat finish with his left foot, which turned out to be the winner.

=== Return to Motherwell ===
On 19 January 2015, Pearson returned to Motherwell for a second spell, signing until the end of the 2014–15 season. He made his second debut for the club on 21 January 2015, in a 4–0 defeat against his former club Celtic. On 3 April 2015, Pearson signed a new two-year contract with Motherwell, keeping him at the club until 2017. He scored the first goal of his second spell at the club on 4 April 2015, in a 2–1 win away to Kilmarnock.

=== Atlético de Kolkata ===
On 29 June 2016, Motherwell confirmed that they and Pearson had come to a mutual agreement to allow Pearson's contract to be terminated in order for the midfielder to join Indian Super League side Atlético de Kolkata.

=== Motherwell (third spell) ===
On 2 February 2017, Pearson signed for Motherwell for a third time, agreeing a contract until the end of the 2016–17 season. He was released by the club in May 2017, at the end of his contract.

== International career ==
Pearson made his international debut for Scotland on 15 November 2003, replacing Neil McCann for the final 20 minutes of a 1–0 first leg win over the Netherlands at Hampden Park in the play-off for UEFA Euro 2004; he did not feature in the second leg, which saw the Dutch qualify. He made one appearance in Scotland's 2006 FIFA World Cup qualification campaign, as a 63rd-minute substitute for Richard Hughes in a 1–0 home defeat to Norway on 9 October 2004. Pearson earned ten caps in all for Scotland, his last being on 17 October 2007 in a 2–0 away defeat to Georgia in UEFA Euro 2008 qualifying, playing the first 66 minutes before being replaced by Kris Boyd.

== Personal ==
Pearson married model and beauty pageant titleholder Aisling Friel in 2010. The couple separated in 2012.

== Career statistics ==
=== Club ===
Appearances and goals by club, season and competition
Club	Season	League			FA Cup		League Cup		Continental		Other^{[A]}		Total	
Club	Season	Division	Apps	Goals	Apps	Goals	Apps	Goals	Apps	Goals	Apps	Goals	Apps	Goals
Motherwell	2000–01	Scottish Premier League	6	0	0	0	0	0	—		—		6	0
Motherwell	2001–02	Scottish Premier League	27	2	1	0	1	0	—		—		29	2
Motherwell	2002–03	Scottish Premier League	29	6	4	0	1	0	—		—		35	6
Motherwell	2003–04	Scottish Premier League	18	5	0	0	1	1	—		—		19	6
Motherwell	Total		80	12	5	0	3	1	0	0	0	0	88	13
Celtic	2003–04	Scottish Premier League	17	3	5	0	0	0	6	0	—		28	3
Celtic	2004–05	Scottish Premier League	8	0	0	0	1	0	0	0	—		9	0
Celtic	2005–06	Scottish Premier League	18	2	1	0	1	0	0	0	—		20	2
Celtic	2006–07	Scottish Premier League	13	1	0	0	2	0	4	1	—		19	2
Celtic	Total		56	6	6	0	4	0	10	1	0	0	76	7
Derby County	2006–07	Championship	9	0	1	0	0	0	—		3	1	13	1
Derby County	2007–08	Premier League	24	0	2	0	1	0	—		—		27	0
Derby County	2008–09	Championship	12	1	1	0	0	0	—		—		13	1
Derby County	2009–10	Championship	37	1	4	0	1	0	—		—		42	1
Derby County	2010–11	Championship	30	1	0	0	0	0	—		—		30	1
Derby County	2011–12	Championship	0	0	0	0	1	0	—		—		1	0
Derby County	Total		112	3	8	0	3	0	0	0	3	1	126	4
Stoke City (loan)	2007–08	Championship	4	0	0	0	0	0	—		—		4	0
Bristol City (loan)	2011–12	Championship	28	3	1	0	0	0	—		—		30	3
Bristol City	2012–13	Championship	36	3	1	0	1	0	—		—		38	3
Kerala Blasters	2014	Indian Super League	17	1	0	0	0	0	—		—		17	1
Motherwell	2014–15	Scottish Premiership	13	1	0	0	0	0	0	0	2	0	15	1
Motherwell	2015–16	Scottish Premiership	26	7	2	2	0	0	—		—		25	9
Motherwell	Total		39	8	2	2	0	0	0	0	2	0	43	10
Atlético de Kolkata	2016	Indian Super League	11	2	—		—		—		1	0	11	2
Motherwell	2016–17	Scottish Premiership	11	1	0	0	0	0	—		—		11	1
Career total			394	39	23	2	11	1	10	1	6	1	444	44

A. The "Other" column constitutes appearances and goals in the Football League play-offs, SPFL Play-offs and Indian Super League finals

=== International ===
Appearances and goals by national team and year
National team	Year	Apps	Goals
Scotland	2004	1	0
Scotland	2005	5	0
Scotland	2007	4	0
Total		10	0

== Honours ==
Celtic

- Scottish Premier League: 2003–04, 2005–06
- Scottish Cup: 2003–04, 2004–05
- Scottish League Cup: 2005–06

Derby County

- Football League Championship play-offs: 2007

Atletico de Kolkata

- Indian Super League: 2016
