= David Ferguson (footballer, born 1996) =

Scottish footballer

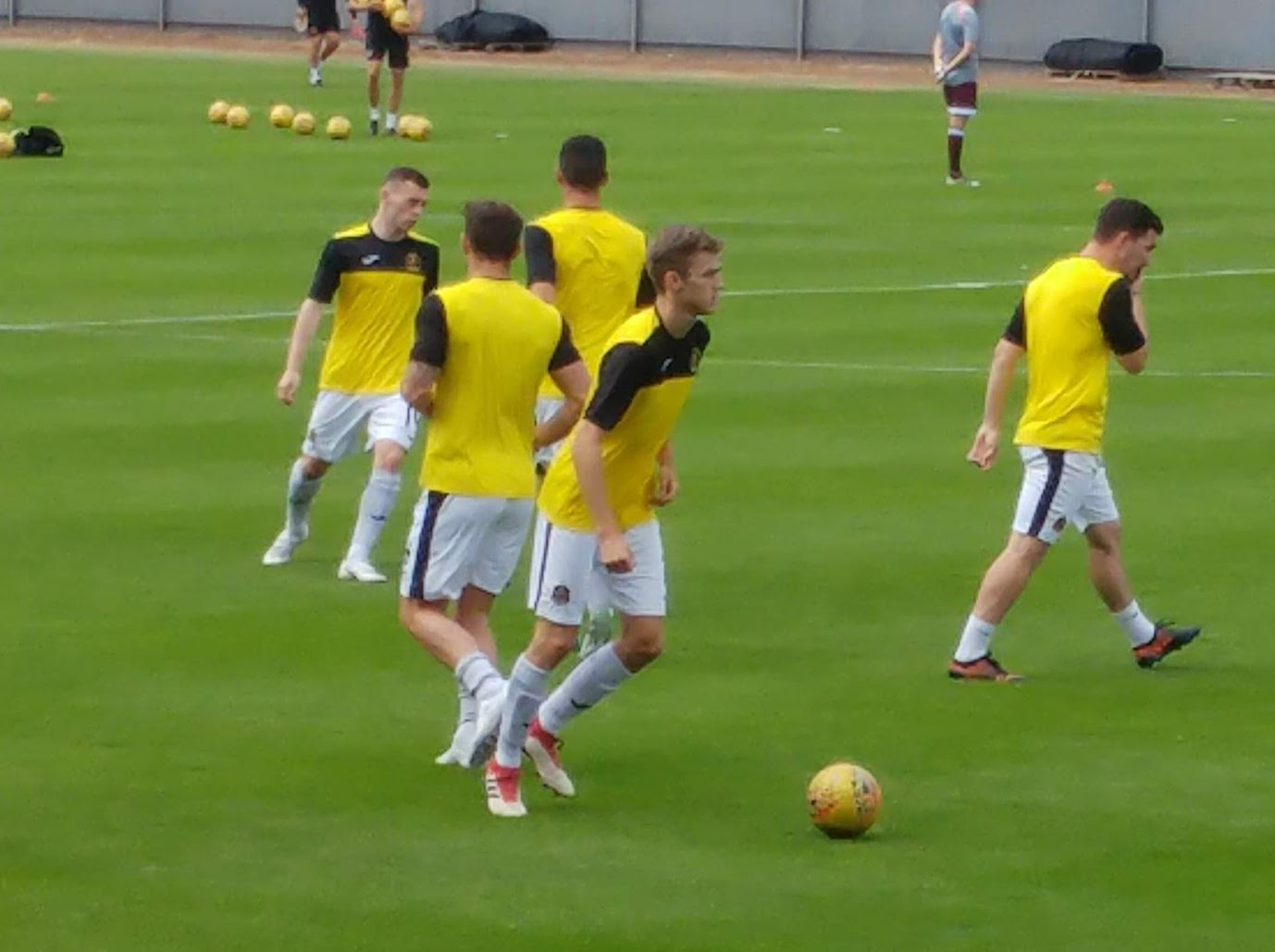
- David warming up for Dumbarton (Loan)

Personal information
- Date of birth: 24 March 1996 (age 30)
- Place of birth: Law, South Lanarkshire, Scotland
- Height: 1.83 m (6 ft 0 in)
- Position: Defender

Team information
- Current team: East Kilbride

Senior career*
Years	Team	Apps	(Gls)
2013–2017	Motherwell	16	(0)
2015	→ Alloa Athletic (loan)	4	(0)
2015	→ Annan Athletic (loan)	9	(0)
2016	→ Airdrieonians (loan)	9	(0)
2017–2019	Ayr United	27	(0)
2019	→ Dumbarton (loan)	15	(0)
2019–2020	Peterhead	18	(1)
2020–2023	Berwick Rangers	33	(4)
- * Club domestic league appearances and goals as of 23:59, 12 November 2020 (UTC)

David Ferguson (born 24 March 1996) is a Scottish footballer who plays as a defender for East Kilbride.

Ferguson is a product of the Motherwell Academy. He has also played for Ayr United and Peterhead, and has spent time on loan at Alloa Athletic, Annan Athletic, Airdrieonians, Dumbarton and Berwick Rangers.

== Career ==
=== Motherwell ===
On 13 August 2014, Ferguson made his debut for Motherwell as a half-time substitute in a narrow 1–0 defeat against Dundee United.

On 27 March 2015, Ferguson moved on loan to Scottish Championship club Alloa Athletic until 16 May 2015. Ferguson moved on loan to Annan Athletic on 1 September 2015, on a deal until January 2016. After his loan deal at Annan ended, Ferguson moved on loan to Airdrieonians, alongside fellow Well player Dylan Mackin.

Ferguson signed a new one-year contract with Motherwell on 26 May 2016. He was released by the club in May 2017, at the end of his contract.

=== Ayr United ===
Ferguson signed for Ayr United in July 2017, before joining Dumbarton on loan in January 2019.

=== Peterhead ===
On 30 August 2019, having been released by Ayr, Ferguson signed for Peterhead.

=== Berwick Rangers ===
During the 2020-21 season, Ferguson was training with Berwick Rangers and appeared as a trialist in three Lowland League games, and scored the winning goal in a match against the University of Stirling. Berwick confirmed the signing of Ferguson on 12 November 2020.

== Career statistics ==
As of 2 August 2020

Appearances and goals by club, seasonand competition
Club	Season	League			Cup		League Cup		Other		Total	
Club	Season	Division	Apps	Goals	Apps	Goals	Apps	Goals	Apps	Goals	Apps	Goals
Motherwell	2014–15	Scottish Premiership	6	0	0	0	0	0	0	0	6	0
Motherwell	2015–16	Scottish Premiership	0	0	0	0	0	0	0	0	0	0
Motherwell	2016–17	Scottish Premiership	10	0	0	0	0	0	0	0	10	0
Motherwell	Total		16	0	0	0	0	0	0	0	16	0
Alloa Athletic (loan)	2014–15	Scottish Championship	4	0	0	0	0	0	1 (Note: Appearance in the Championship play-offs)	0	5	0
Annan Athletic (loan)	2015–16	Scottish League Two	9	0	1	0	0	0	0	0	10	0
Airdrieonians (loan)	2015–16	Scottish League One	9	0	0	0	0	0	0	0	9	0
Ayr United	2017–18	Scottish League One	24	0	3	0	4	0	2 (Note: Appearances in the Scottish Challenge Cup)	0	33	0
Ayr United	2018–19	Scottish Championship	3	0	0	0	3	0	0	0	6	0
Ayr United	2019–20	Scottish Championship	0	0	0	0	3	0	0	0	3	0
Ayr United	Total		27	0	3	0	10	0	2	0	42	0
Dumbarton (loan)	2018–19	Scottish League One	15	0	0	0	0	0	0	0	15	0
Peterhead	2019–20	Scottish League One	18	1	1	0	0	0	0	0	19	1
Career total			98	1	5	0	10	0	3	0	116	1
