= Lee Lucas =

Welsh footballer

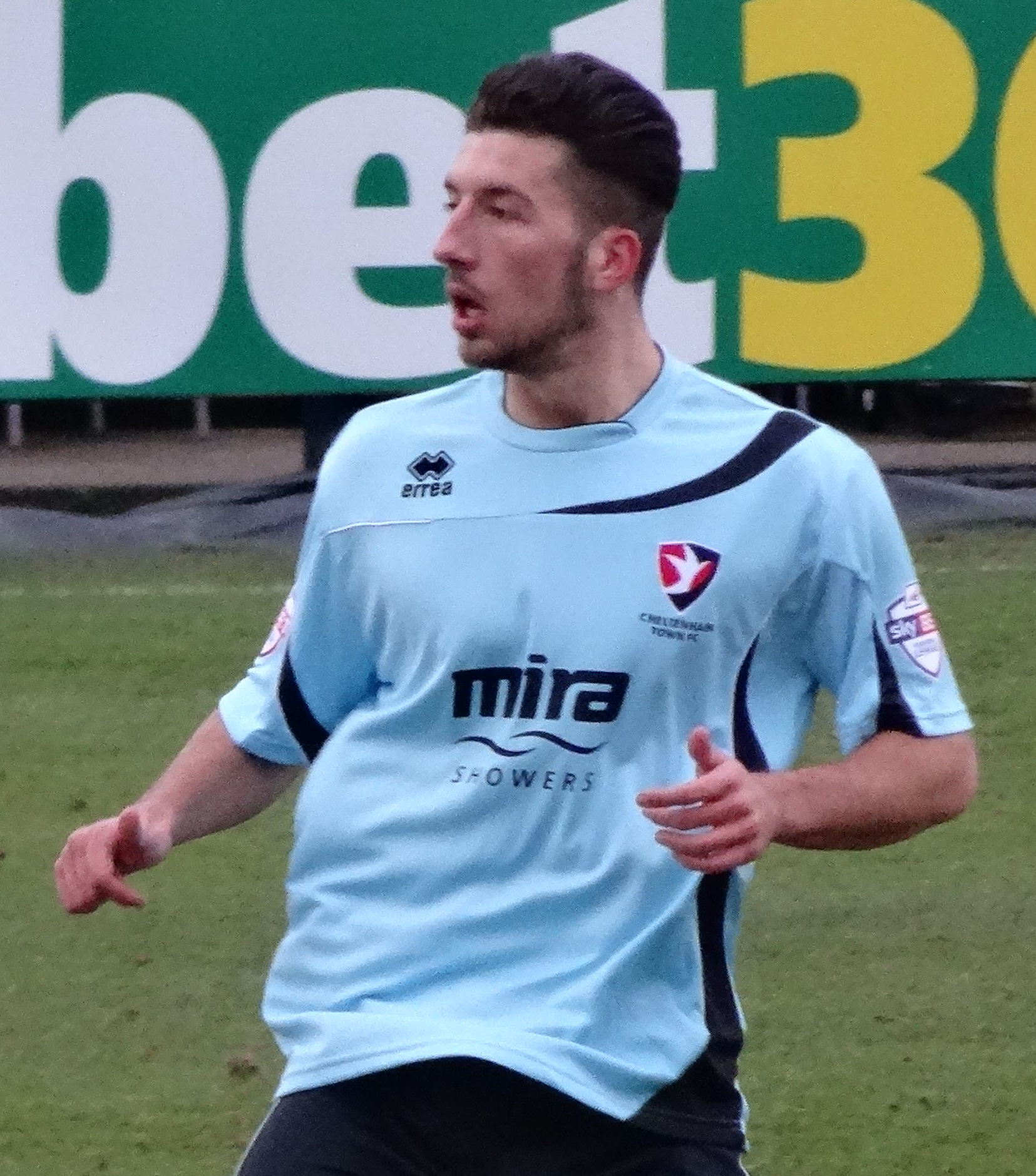
- Lucas playing for Cheltenham Town in 2014

Personal information
- Full name: Lee Paul Lucas
- Date of birth: 10 June 1992 (age 34)
- Place of birth: Aberdare, Wales
- Height: 1.80 m (5 ft 11 in)
- Position: Midfielder

Team information
- Current team: Merthyr Town

Youth career
- 2001–2010: Swansea City

Senior career*
Years	Team	Apps	(Gls)
2010–2016	Swansea City	1	(0)
2012	→ Burton Albion (loan)	1	(0)
2014	→ Cheltenham Town (loan)	2	(0)
2016–2017	Motherwell	10	(0)
2018–2020	Merthyr Town		
2020–2023	Taunton Town	56	(3)
2024	Barry Town United	8	(1)
2024–	Merthyr Town	24	(0)

International career^{‡}
2008–2009	Wales U17	12	(1)
2009–2010	Wales U19	11	(1)
2010–2014	Wales U21	19	(2)
- * Club domestic league appearances and goals as of 19:44, 21 March 2025 (UTC) ‡ National team caps and goals as of 21:21, 19 May 2014 (UTC)

Lee Paul Lucas (born 10 June 1992) is a Welsh professional footballer who plays as a midfielder for Merthyr Town. He is a former Wales under-21 international.

== Club career ==
=== Swansea City ===
Born in Aberdare, Lucas began his football career when he joined Cwmaman and joined Swansea City at the age of eight. Having making progress turned professional for the 2010–11 season. Between 2010 and 2011, Lucas signed a contract, keeping him until 2013 and was awarded the club's youth development player of the season award at the end of the 2009–10 season. He made his senior debut for Swansea on 7 May 2011, in a 4–0 victory over Sheffield United.

After being told he will be loaned out to gain first team experience, Lucas joined Burton Albion on loan on 26 January 2012, until the end of the season. Lucas made his Burton Albion debut three days later, making his first start, in a 1–1 draw against Oxford United. However, this turns out to be his only Burton Albion appearance, as he struggled with a hamstring injury that saw him miss seven matches. Lucas regained his fitness, only to sustained a fractured back that ruled him out for the entire season. Following his loan spell at Burton Albion came to an end, Lucas signed a new three-year contract with Swansea in June 2012.

On 30 January 2014, Lucas signed for Cheltenham Town on an initial one-month loan deal. Lucas made his Cheltenham debut two days later, in a 1–1 draw against Northampton Town. Lucas made his second and last appearance seven days later on 8 February 2014, in a 0–0 draw against York City. After making two appearances for the club, Lucas returned to his parent club on 28 February 2014.

Lucas missed the first seven months of the 2014–15 season through injury. Lucas then suffered a further injury on his playing return for Swansea City Under-21s. In July 2015 Lucas signed a one-year contract extension with Swansea. After nineteen on the sideline, Lucas made his return in the club's reserve, where he played the second half of Swansea Under-21s 2–0 defeat to Aston Villa on 22 February 2016. After the match, Lucas stated the win over Aston Villa was his personal victory.

Lucas was released in May 2016, ending his fifteen years association with the club.

=== Motherwell ===
Lucas signed a short-term contract with Scottish club Motherwell in July 2016. He played in a Scottish League Cup tie against Annan Athletic, but was forced off due to injury. On 31 August 2016, Lucas was released from his contract, but then on 14 September 2016, he signed a contract with the club until January 2017. On 10 January 2017, he extended his contract until the end of the 2016–17 season. He was released by Motherwell at the end of the 2016–17 season.

=== Later career ===
In August 2018 he signed for Merthyr Town.

On 30 May 2020 he signed for Taunton Town. He left the club by mutual consent in December 2023.

In January 2024 he signed for Barry Town United.

In June 2024 he returned to Merthyr Town.

== International career ==
Lucas has represented Wales at various levels from under-17 to under-21 level.

On 16 November 2010, Lucas was first called up by Wales under-21 and made his debut the next day in 1–0 win over Austria under-21. In January 2013, Lucas was selected in the Wales under-21 squad for the friendly match and captained for the first time against Iceland under-21 on 6 February 2013.

== Career statistics ==
As of 23 May 2017

Club	Season	League		FA Cup		League Cup		Other		Total	
Club	Season	Apps	Goals	Apps	Goals	Apps	Goals	Apps	Goals	Apps	Goals
Swansea City	2010–11	1	0	0	0	0	0	0	0	1	0
Swansea City	2011–12	0	0	0	0	0	0	0	0	0	0
Swansea City	2012–13	0	0	0	0	0	0	0	0	0	0
Swansea City	2013–14	0	0	0	0	0	0	0	0	0	0
Swansea City	2014–15	0	0	0	0	0	0	0	0	0	0
Swansea City	2015–16	0	0	0	0	0	0	0	0	0	0
Swansea City	Total	1	0	0	0	0	0	0	0	1	0
Burton Albion (loan)	2011–12	1	0	0	0	0	0	0	0	1	0
Cheltenham Town (loan)	2013–14	2	0	0	0	0	0	0	0	2	0
Motherwell	2016–17	10	0	0	0	1	0	0	0	11	0
Career total		14	0	0	0	1	0	0	0	15	0
