= Luka Belić (footballer) =

Serbian footballer

Personal information
- Full name: Luka Belić
- Date of birth: 18 April 1996 (age 30)
- Place of birth: Pančevo, FR Yugoslavia
- Height: 1.73 m (5 ft 8 in)
- Positions: Forward; winger

Team information
- Current team: Giannitsa

Youth career
- 2010–2012: OFK Beograd

Senior career*
| Years | Team | Apps | (Gls) |
| 2012–2015 | OFK Beograd | 6 | (0) |
| 2015–2017 | West Ham United | 0 | (0) |
| 2016–2017 | → Motherwell (loan) | 0 | (0) |
| 2017 | Celje | 6 | (2) |
| 2017 | Spartak Subotica | 0 | (0) |
| 2018–2019 | Nestos Chrysoupoli | | |
| 2019–2020 | Dinamo 1945 | | |
| 2020–2021 | Ypato | | |
| 2021 | Poros | | |
| 2022- | Giannitsa | | |

International career
| 2012–2013 | Serbia U17 | 6 | (5) |
| 2014 | Serbia U19 | 2 | (0) |
- * Club domestic league appearances and goals as of 29 May 2017

Luka Belić (Serbian Cyrillic: Лука Белић; born 18 April 1996) is a Serbian professional footballer who plays as a forward for Giannitsa.

== Club career ==
Belić made his senior debut for OFK Beograd in a home league match against Red Star Belgrade on 25 April 2012 and became the youngest player in the history of the Serbian SuperLiga.

On 13 September 2015, Belić signed for West Ham United. On 31 August 2016, Belić signed on loan for Scottish Premiership club Motherwell, agreeing a six-month deal.

On 6 February 2017, Belić joined Slovenian club NK Celje.

Ahead of the 2017–18 Serbian SuperLiga season, Belić returned to Serbia, signing for Spartak Subotica. Belić only made one appearance during his time at the club, scoring in a 8–1 Serbian Cup win against Polet Lipljan.

Following his spell with Spartak Subotica, Belić joined Greek club Nestos Chrysoupoli in 2018.

In 2019, Belić signed for his hometown club Dinamo 1945.

In January 2020, Belić returned to Greece, joining AO Ypato, before signing for Poros in July 2021.

== International career ==
Belić has been capped for Serbia's under-17 and under-19 national teams.

== Personal life ==
Belić's father, Dušan, is a former professional footballer. Belić's brother, Kristijan, is also a professional footballer.

Belić holds a Belgian passport.
